= Whitsundays, Queensland =

Whitsundays
- Suburb
- Interactive map of Whitsundays
- Coordinates: 20.2791°S 148.9141°E
- Country: Australia
- State: Queensland
- LGA: Whitsunday Region

Government
  - State electorate: Whitsunday
  - Federal division: Dawson

Area
  - Total: 8,693.2 km^{2} (3,356.5 sq mi)

Population
  - Total: 2,281 (2021 census)
  - Density: 0.26239/km^{2} (0.67958/sq mi)
- Time zone: UTC+10:00 (AEST)
- Postcode: 4802

Whitsundays is an island group locality that consists of the Whitsunday Islands. It is in the Whitsunday Region, Queensland, Australia. It is off the Queensland east coast in the Coral Sea, which is a mix of inhabited and uninhabited islands. In the 2021 census, Whitsundays had a population of 2,281 people.

== Geography ==
The notable or larger islands in the locality include, from north to south:

- Hayman Island (20.0508°S 148.8878°E)
- Hook Island (20.1167°S 148.9222°E)
- Whitsunday Island (20.2597°S 148.9805°E)
- North Molle Island (20.2286°S 148.8211°E)
- Daydream Island (20.2553°S 148.8139°E)
- Cid Island (20.2636°S 148.9150°E)
- South Molle Island (20.2692°S 148.8369°E)
- Haslewood Island (20.2814°S 149.0861°E)
- Long Island (20.3647°S 148.8586°E)
- Hamilton Island (20.3533°S 148.9619°E)
- Dent Island (20.3578°S 148.9325°E)

In addition to the islands, the locality includes a small area of coastal foreshore on mainland Queensland (20.2754°S 148.7300°E) near the Airlie Sports Park.

== Demographics ==
In the 2016 census, the locality of Whitsundays had a population of 2,269 people. The most populous island was Hamilton Island with 1,867 people (82% of the locality's population).

In the 2021 census, the locality of Whitsundays had a population of 2,281 people. The most populous island was Hamilton Island with 1,759 people (77% of the locality's population).

== Education ==
Hayman Island State School is a government primary (Prep–6) school for boys and girls at Hayman Island (20.0565°S 148.8873°E). In 2017, the school had an enrolment of 6 students with 2 teachers.

Hamilton Island State School is a government primary (Prep–6) school for boys and girls at Hamilton Island (20.3452°S 148.9530°E). In 2017, the school had an enrolment of 56 students with 5 teachers (4 full-time equivalent) and 7 non-teaching staff (4 full-time equivalent).

There are no primary schools on the other islands in the locality and there are no secondary schools serving the locality; the alternatives are distance education and boarding school.
