= Cyclone Ada =

1970 tropical cyclone

Severe Tropical Cyclone Ada
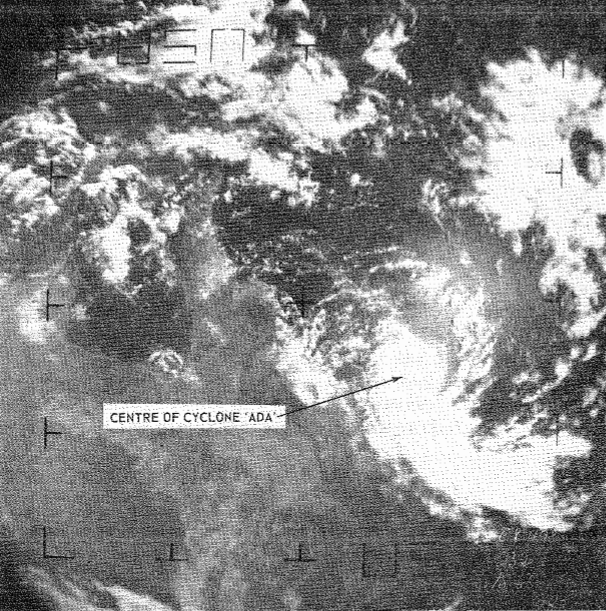
- Satellite image of Cyclone Ada on 17 January

Meteorological history
- Formed: 3 January 1970
- Dissipated: 19 January 1970

Category 3 severe tropical cyclone
- 10-minute sustained (BOM)
- Highest winds: 150 km/h (90 mph)
- Lowest pressure: 962 hPa (mbar); 28.41 inHg

Category 2-equivalent tropical cyclone
- 1-minute sustained (SSHWS/JTWC)
- Highest winds: 155 km/h (100 mph)

Overall effects
- Fatalities: 14
- Damage: A$12 million
- Areas affected: Queensland
- IBTrACS
- Part of the 1969–70 South Pacific and Australian region cyclone seasons

Severe Tropical Cyclone Ada was a small but intense tropical cyclone that severely impacted the Whitsunday Region of Queensland, Australia, in January 1970. It has been described as a defining event in the history of the Whitsunday Islands, and was the most damaging storm in the mainland town of Proserpine's history at the time. Forming over the far eastern Coral Sea in early January, the weather disturbance that would become Ada remained weak and disorganised for nearly two weeks as it slowly moved in a clockwise loop. Accelerating toward the southwest, the system was named Ada on 15 January. All observations of the fledgling cyclone were made remotely with weather satellite imagery until it passed over an automated weather station on 16 January. The extremely compact cyclone, with a gale radius of just 55 km (35 mi), intensified into a Category 3 severe tropical cyclone just before striking the Whitsunday Islands at 14:00 UTC on 17 January. At 18:30 UTC, Ada's eye crossed the coast at Shute Harbour. The cyclone made little inland progress before stalling northwest of Mackay and dissipating on 19 January.

Ada devastated several resort islands in the Whitsundays, in some cases destroying virtually all facilities and guest cabins. The biggest resort, located on Daydream Island, was obliterated, with similar destruction seen on South Molle, Hayman, and Long islands; since most boats docked on these islands were destroyed, hundreds of tourists in these resorts became stranded and required emergency rescue. Based on the severity of the damage, wind gusts were later estimated at 220 km/h (140 mph) . As Ada moved ashore, most homes were damaged or destroyed in communities near the storm's landfall point, including Cannonvale, Airlie Beach, and Shute Harbour. Extreme rainfall totals as high as 1,250 mm (49 in) caused massive river flooding in coastal waterways between Bowen and Mackay. The floodwaters washed out roads and left some locations isolated for days. Offshore, seven people were missing and presumed dead after their fishing trawler encountered the cyclone. Ada killed a total of 14 people, including 11 at sea, and caused A$12 million in damage. The cyclone revealed inadequacies in the warning broadcast system, and served as the impetus for enhanced cyclone awareness programs that have been credited with saving lives in subsequent cyclones. In January 2020, on the 50th anniversary of the disaster, a memorial to the storm victims was erected along the shoreline at Airlie Beach.

== Meteorological history ==
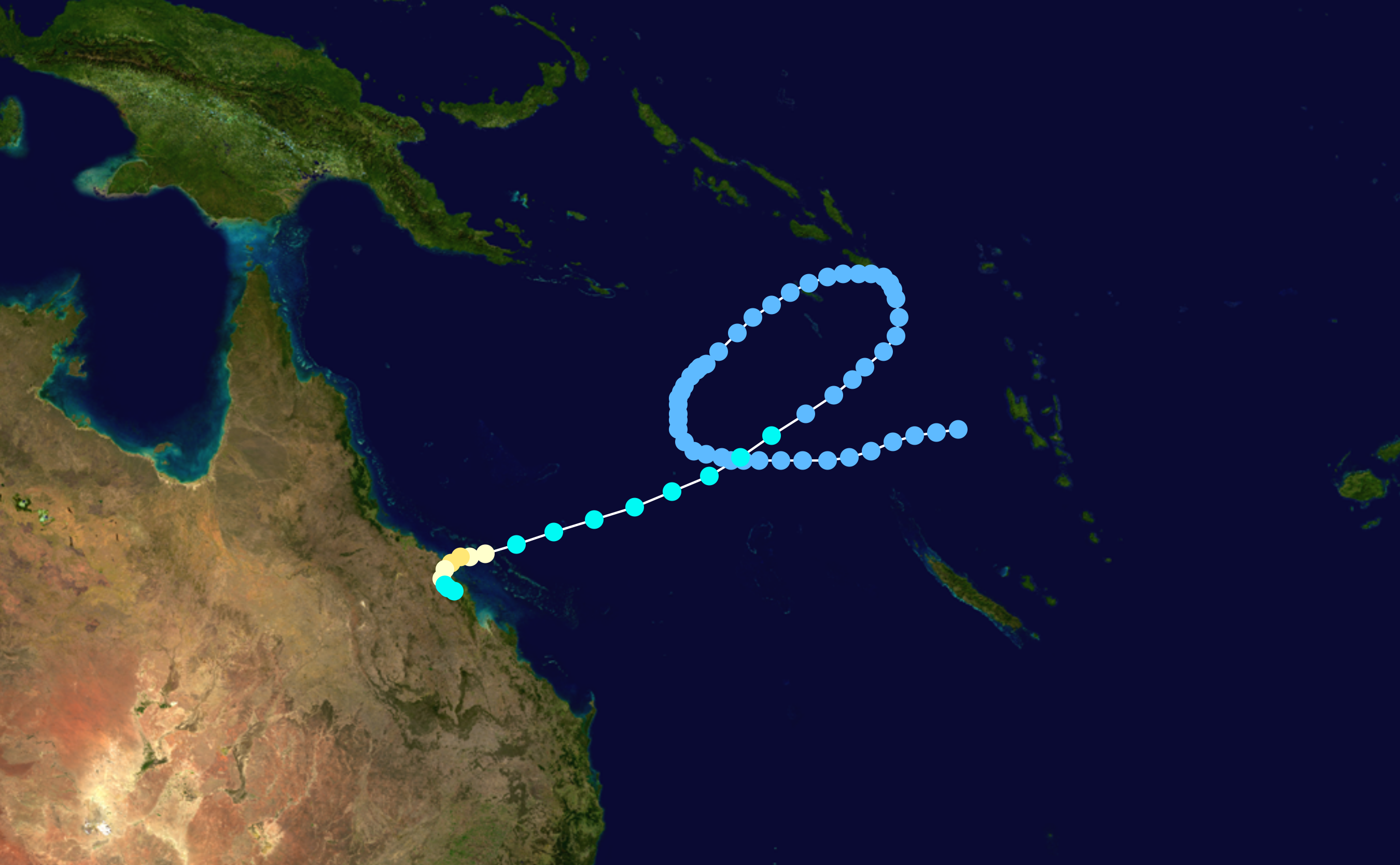
Map plotting the storm's track and intensity, according to the Saffir–Simpson scale Map key Saffir–Simpson scale Tropical depression (≤38 mph, ≤62 km/h) Tropical storm (39–73 mph, 63–118 km/h) Category 1 (74–95 mph, 119–153 km/h) Category 2 (96–110 mph, 154–177 km/h) Category 3 (111–129 mph, 178–208 km/h) Category 4 (130–156 mph, 209–251 km/h) Category 5 (≥157 mph, ≥252 km/h) Unknown Storm type Tropical cyclone Subtropical cyclone Extratropical cyclone, remnant low, tropical disturbance, or monsoon depression

Cyclone Ada was first noted by weather satellite imagery as a disorganised area of disturbed weather over the eastern Coral Sea on 5 January. In the early stages of its life, the system was far from ships and only peripherally detected by weather stations. More recent analyses have determined the tropical low originated on 3 January, just west of Vanuatu. For about ten days between 5 and 15 January, observations of the low remained scarce, but infrequent satellite imagery revealed that it slowly completed a cyclonic loop nearing the Solomon Islands before curving back toward the southwest while remaining weak. On 15 January, the Bureau of Meteorology's (BoM) Tropical Cyclone Warning Centre in Brisbane named the storm Ada and issued the first warning to shipping interests. Ada reached tropical cyclone status on the modern-day Australian cyclone scale the next day, while centered near 19.0°S 153.3°E. The cyclone continued tracking west-southwest toward Queensland, and at 14:00 UTC on 16 January, it passed over an automated weather station on Marion Reef, about 480 km (300 mi) east of Bowen. The site recorded sustained winds of up to 93 km/h (58 mph).

With the first direct confirmation of the storm's growing strength, the BoM issued its initial public cyclone warning at 19:00 UTC. The cyclone's centre moved within range of the weather radar site in Mackay around 06:00 UTC on 17 January. Over the next several hours, radar revealed the system was moving slower and more erratically than expected, occasionally jogging to the east. Ada was an exceptionally compact cyclone, with a 55 km (35 mi) radius of gale-force winds, compared to the 150 km (100 mi) radius generally considered "small" for tropical cyclones. Between 11:00 and 17:00 UTC on 17 January, the cyclone's eye shrank from 28 km (17 mi) to just 18 km (11 mi) across, as measured by radar. As a result of its small size, the storm's onslaught was much more sudden than normal, with little rain and steady barometric pressures in the hours before landfall. At 12:00 UTC on 17 January, Ada reached its peak intensity, with 10-minute average maximum sustained winds of 150 km/h (90 mph). This made it a Category 3 severe tropical cyclone.

Beginning around 14:00 UTC, the core of Ada crossed the Whitsunday Islands. As the eye passed overhead, pressure fell to 976 hPa (28.82 inHg) on Hayman Island—just under 30 km (20 mi) northeast of Shute Harbour on the mainland—and although peak winds were not measured, gusts on Hayman Island were estimated at over 160 km/h (100 mph); similar estimates were made by a ship in the Whitsunday Passage. Dent Island recorded a pressure of 965 hPa (28.50 inHg) as the centre made its closest approach at 17:30 UTC. At 18:30 UTC, the system made landfall at Shute Harbour on the Whitsunday Coast while still at peak intensity. Air pressure at Airlie Beach, about 5 km (3 mi) away from the centre of circulation, fell to 962 hPa (28.41 inHg), suggesting that the storm's minimum central pressure was slightly lower. Upon moving ashore, the system slowed and curved toward the south, and after reaching a point about 60 km (40 mi) northwest of Mackay on 18 January, it became nearly stationary. Around the same time, the cyclone's structure began to deteriorate, with multiple circulation centres appearing on radar imagery. Just after 06:00 UTC on 19 January, the BoM issued its final advisory on Ada, and the system dissipated shortly after.

== Preparations ==
As Ada reached North Queensland, the BoM issued cyclone warnings on a three-hour cycle, with more frequent bulletins occasionally released as needed. Flood warnings were issued for watersheds of susceptible rivers like the Pioneer and Connors. The bureau's post-storm assessment of the disaster revealed that local broadcasts of advisories were sometimes delayed by several hours or not made at all, and public awareness was generally inadequate. In a misguided attempt to quell panic, one radio station appended the BoM's warning with an unapproved message that there was no cause for alarm because of the cyclone's small size. Due to the unusual nature of the storm, including its delayed arrival in some areas, many residents criticised or disregarded forecasts. Additionally, many tourists in the region were unfamiliar with the dangers of tropical cyclones. Findings from studies of the public response to Ada were used as the basis for upgraded warning systems and the introduction of more cyclone education campaigns; these initiatives were credited with saving lives and property in later storms such as Cyclone Althea in December 1971.

== Impact ==
Aerial view of the destruction on Daydream Island

Offshore, the 16.7 m (55 ft) concrete fishing trawler Whakatane went missing while en route from Mackay to Townsville. The search for the vessel and her seven occupants was suspended on 26 January, around the same time that wreckage, believed to be from Whakatane, was identified near Long Island. According to the BoM, maritime tragedies during Ada were likely caused by delayed or insufficient response to warnings. Some boatowners remained aboard their vessels throughout the cyclone and others attempted to move their boats to different locations during the lull at the storm's eye. In one instance, five men were reported missing after they ventured into the storm to secure a boat anchored at Hayman Island. Overall, storm damage was estimated at A$12 million, the equivalent of over $1 billion in 2012 values when accounting for growth and inflation. Ada is believed to have killed 14 people, 11 of them at sea.

=== Whitsunday Islands ===
In the Whitsundays, Ada's impact was most severe on Hayman, Long, Daydream, South Molle, and Hook islands. Peak winds in the storm's path were not recorded, but based on the severity of the damage, it is estimated that gusts may have exceeded 220 km/h (140 mph). Many trees were either blown over or debarked and stripped of their foliage, with scraps of roofing material left hanging from their limbs. Throughout the islands, Ada ravaged resorts and boats, forcing hundreds of holidaymakers to await emergency rescue.

Most of the accommodation cabins were destroyed on South Molle Island, where a woman in one of the structures was killed and her partner severely injured. Damage on South Molle amounted to $500,000. On Hayman Island, the winds unroofed most cabins and other buildings, accounting for an estimated $1 million in damage. Long Island was subjected to Ada's left-front quadrant—the most intense part of the storm—and the Palm Bay Resort there was devastated, with only a few huts remaining. However, another resort on the western side of the island escaped relatively unscathed. The biggest resort in the Whitsundays at the time, on Daydream Island, was destroyed, requiring $400,000 to rebuild. About 150 tourists sought shelter in part of a recreation hall, which was the only major portion of a building left intact on Daydream. Nearly every building on Hook Island was lost, and four men remained sheltered there for a week after the storm. Farther south, rough seas broke apart a 90 m (300 ft) stone jetty at Brampton Island in the Cumberland Group.

=== Mainland ===
Torrential rains extended along mostly rural areas of the coast from Bowen to Mackay, while the strongest winds were concentrated in the area from Cannonvale to Shute Harbor and extending inland to Proserpine. Nine hours of damaging winds unroofed or otherwise damaged around 40% of the houses in Proserpine in what was described as the worst storm in the town's history at the time. Trees were uprooted, crops were flattened, and residential outhouses were blown apart. Elsewhere, in Shute Harbour, a motel and the few houses there were demolished, along with 85% of the homes in Airlie Beach and nearly all of Cannonvale's 200 houses. According to Minister for Mines and Main Roads Ron Camm, the cyclone forced 750 people from their homes. Around 200 storm victims sought refuge in a school in Cannonvale that was converted into an emergency shelter.

As the winds subsided, the weakening cyclone dropped as much as 1.25 m (49 in) of rain, resulting in massive river flooding near the coast. Some locations received up to 860 mm (34 in) of precipitation in just 24 hours. The Pioneer River in Mackay and the Don River in Bowen both experienced severe flooding; the latter overtopped a bridge by 3 m (10 ft), while at one point the former was well above flood stage and rising by 1 m (3.3 ft) per hour. A shopping centre in Mackay was flooded to a depth of 1 meter. Some waterways approached all-time record levels, with one creek north of Proserpine swelling to 11 km (7 mi) across. Many farms were inundated by floodwaters, losing livestock, machinery, and crops. The torrents washed out bridges and roads and severed communications, isolating communities such as Proserpine and Airlie Beach for several days. As a result of the widespread flooding, hundreds of motorists became stranded on a long stretch of the Bruce Highway. Two people died in the flood-ravaged area, including one soldier who drowned near Proserpine. From Bowen north to Townsville, more modest rainfall associated with the upper-level remnants of Ada proved beneficial, helping to alleviate persistent drought conditions.

== Aftermath ==
Following the storm, looters traveled to Proserpine to pick through ruined homes and boats. The nine-officer police force were unable to manage the outbreak of crime, and a supplemental anti-looting squad soon arrived in the town. Australian Army soldiers and Air Force planes dispatched to the Whitsunday Islands evacuated around 500 people from the devastated resort islands. Meanwhile, Navy boats retrieved injured individuals requiring urgent medical treatment. Residents of flood-stricken communities required vaccination against typhoid fever as a preventative measure. Private citizens also rushed to the aid of stranded resort guests; in January 2014, a local boat captain was formally honoured by MP George Christensen and Premier Campbell Newman for his role in evacuating 180 people from Daydream Island.

With Queensland's resources already strained by an ongoing severe drought, the Commonwealth Government of Australia agreed to evenly split the cost of restoring government assets damaged by Ada; this expenditure would normally fall to the state alone. By August 1970, the state and federal governments had issued a combined $708,000 in grants for repairing flood damage in Bowen. The name Ada was later retired from the Australian tropical cyclone naming list due to the cyclone's severe impact.

In the islands, about 400 workers rushed to repair the resorts before peak tourism season; by mid-May, about 100 holiday cabins had been rebuilt and 20 boats restored to service. Hayman and Daydream islands reopened to guests in June and August 1970, respectively. South Molle Island changed ownership multiple times during the 1970s as it struggled to reattain its pre-Ada success, and many of the other resort islands were also sold as their owners were unable to meet the cost of renovations. The destruction of resorts in the Whitsundays triggered a sharp decline in Australian tourism revenue. Decades later, Ada is still regarded as a "defining" event in the development of the Whitsunday region. In 2016, Whitsunday MP Jason Costigan advocated for erecting a memorial to Ada's victims, and community members formed a small committee exploring this possibility in early 2017. In April 2019, Whitsunday Regional Council voted unanimously to approve $15,000 in funding for a memorial at Airlie Beach to be completed in time for the 50th anniversary of the disaster. Finally, on 18 January 2020, a stone monument, 1.7 m (5.6 ft) tall and inscribed with the names of the 14 cyclone victims, was unveiled at a ceremony attended by 200 people.

== See also ==
- Climate of Australia
- Cyclone Debbie
- Cyclone Joy
- Cyclone Yasi
