= Air Whitsunday =

Australian charter airline

IATA	ICAO	Call sign
—	RWS	—
- Fleet size: 6
- Destinations: 6
- Website: www.airwhitsunday.com.au

Air Whitsunday is a charter airline based in Australia which operates a fleet of seaplanes. The company also operates tours.

== History ==
Air Whitsunday pioneered seaplane services to the Great Barrier Reef and the Whitsunday Island in April 1973, using a Lake Buccaneer light amphibian aircraft. In 1977, it moved its operational base from Long Island in the Whitsunday Islands to Whitsunday Airport on the mainland, later purchasing the airport. By 1981, the airline was operating a fleet of five Buccaneers, which were supplemented by a Partenavia P.68 in 1982 and a Britten-Norman BN-2 Islander in 1983, which were used on sightseeing flights and for scheduled passenger services to Mackay Airport. 1983 also saw the airline purchase two Grumman Mallard amphibians to supplement the smaller Buccaneers on tourist flights out to the Barrier Reef as well as to run a scheduled service to Townsville.

== Destinations ==
- Whitsunday Airport
- Whitsunday Coast Airport
- Hamilton Island
- Mackay Airport
- Peppers Palm Bay
- Hayman Island

== Fleet ==
- 3-Cessna 208 Caravans
- 3-DHC-2 DeHavilland Beavers

== Tours ==
From Whitsunday Airport:

- Reef Adventure Tour - showcases the magnitude of the Great Barrier Reef from above, before landing and transferring to a semi-submersible at Hardy Reef for coral viewing and snorkelling. Aerial views of Hook Island and Hardy and Heart Reefs.
- Whitehaven Experience - captures Whitehaven Beach and Hill Inlet in all its glory, 7 Kilometres of pure white silica beach on Whitsunday Island.
- Reef & Whitehaven Panorama - the Great Barrier Reef and Whitehaven Beach, all on the one tour. Combine all of the features of our Reef Adventure Tour with a one-hour stop on Whitehaven Beach, an extraordinarily beautiful part of our World Heritage National Park.
- Reef & Island Flight - Scenic flights.

== See also ==
- List of airlines of Australia
