= Lindeman Island =

In the Whitsunday Islands

Coordinates: 20°27′S 149°02′E

- Interactive map of Lindeman Island

Geography
- Location: Coral Sea
- Archipelago: Whitsunday Islands
- Total islands: 74
- Highest point: Mount Oldfield

Administration
- Australia
- State: Queensland
- Local government area: Mackay Region

Lindeman Island is an island in the Lindeman Group of the Whitsunday Islands off the coast of Queensland, Australia. The island was named by Captain Bedwell after his sub-lieutenant, George Sidney Lindeman whilst aboard the Royal Navy vessel HMS Virago.

Most of the island is included in the Lindeman Islands National Park, which also protects another 13 islands. There are also a resort and an airport on the island. Lindeman Island was created after a volcanic mountain range was drowned by rising sea levels.

== History ==
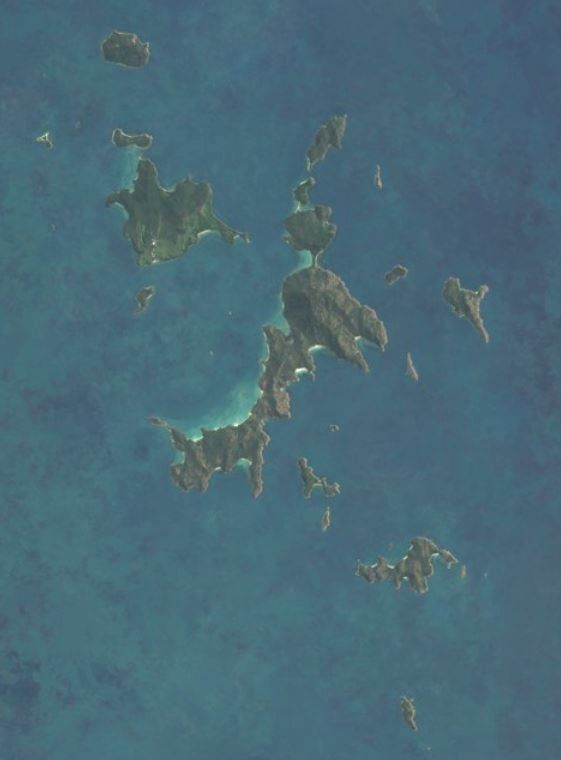
Lindeman Islands

The island was occupied by Aboriginal tribes, known generally as the Ngaro, until circa 1900, who used the area for fishing. It is unknown if they lived on the island permanently. An incident occurred on nearby Shaw Island between the local tribe and some Europeans in late August 1861. One aboriginal was shot dead and Henry Irving, a squatter from Broadsound, and Nicholas Millar, a sailor from Rockhampton, were bludgeoned to death. The Native Police officer at the logging camp of Eugene Fitzalan on Whitsunday Island was notified. A large punitive mission afterwards set out in two schooners under Lieutenant Williams. They destroyed the native camp and burnt or impounded all the canoes found. The aboriginals themselves apparently escaped into the mountainous terrain. They resisted later attempts to be relocated to the mainland. In 1905 Captain James Adderton took out a sheep grazing lease over the island and established facilities for shearing. In 1923 Angus Nicolson began a small lodge for visitors, although he did not build permanent accommodation until 1929. The Nicolsons had local Ngaro people working for them on the island. Goats roamed wild and visitors were requested to shoot only for food.

Before the end of World War II, Reg Ansett of Ansett Transport Industries saw the potential of the area and began planning for air services. Starting in 1952 Barrier Reef Airways began flying boat services to a number of islands including Lindeman. Ansett opened Whitsunday Coast Airport in 1957 to allow transfers to smaller island aircraft. The resort was sold to P&O in 1974. It was later sold to the State Government Insurance Office, who sold it in 1985 to East-West Airlines. In 1992 it was sold to Club Med.

== Resort ==
The resort was the first Club Med established in the Whitsunday Islands and in 1992 became the only Club Med village in Australia.

Lindeman Island resort was closed on 31 January 2012 after Cyclone Yasi.

On 27 April 2012 it was purchased by White Horse Holding, a Chinese firm, for $12 million. The price paid was considerably lower than expected because the resort needed refurbishment. White Horse announced plans to redevelop the Island into three luxury resorts (5 star beach resort, 6 star spa resort, and 6 star eco resort) including upgrading the airstrip and facilities, a proposed 'safe harbour' where approximately 50 boats will be able to moor, two tourist villa precincts and a central village with restaurants and cafes, sporting facilities, retail shops and communal recreation areas. This project got stuck in development difficulties.

White Horse sold the island at a loss to a Singapore-based family in early 2023.
