= Syzygium gustavioides =

Conservation status
- Least Concern (NCA)

Scientific classification
- Kingdom: Plantae
- Clade: Tracheophytes
- Clade: Angiosperms
- Clade: Eudicots
- Clade: Rosids
- Order: Myrtales
- Family: Myrtaceae
- Genus: Syzygium
- Species: S. gustavioides

Binomial name
- Syzygium gustavioides (F.M.Bailey) B.Hyland, 1983

Synonyms
- Eugenia gustavioides F.M.Bailey, 1899; Cleistocalyx gustavioides Merr. & L.M.Perry, 1937

Species of flowering plant

Syzygium gustavioides, known commonly as the watergum, is a species of flowering plant in the family Myrtaceae that is endemic to Queensland in Australia.

== Habitat & distribution ==
The species can be found in tropical rainforest in northern Queensland, where it is for the most part restricted to the Wet Tropics, with an additional population also being present on South Molle Island near Airlie Beach.

== Description ==
This species grows as a tree to a height of 40 metres. The species has a perennial life cycle and is hermaphroditic. The flowering and fruiting time of this species is from January to June. The fruit is fleshy, indehiscent, baccate and/or drupaceous. The seeds of this species are dispersed by mammals and other 'non-flying vertebrates'. The leaves are 155 millimetres long and 75 millimetres wide. The species is evergreen.

== Conservation ==
Under the Nature Conservation Act 1992 in Queensland it has been classified as Least Concern.
