= Molle Islands National Park =

National park in Australia

- IUCN category II (national park)
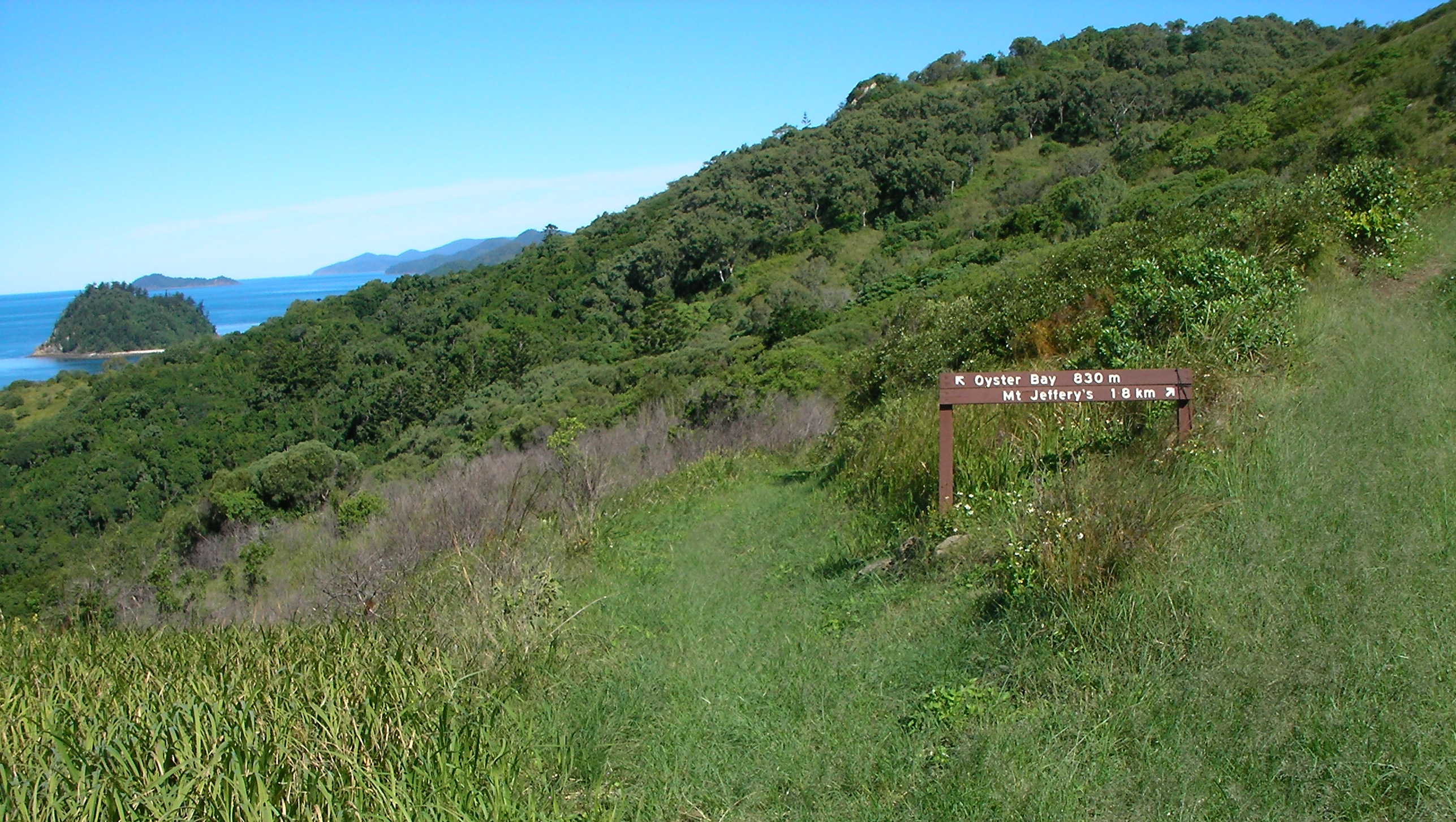
- Track on South Molle Island, 2007

- Location within Queensland
- Location: Queensland
- Nearest city: Airlie Beach
- Coordinates: 20°22′36″S 148°51′27″E
- Area: 18 km^{2} (6.9 sq mi)
- Governing body: Queensland Parks and Wildlife Service
- Website: Official website

Molle Islands is a national park in North Queensland, Australia, 913 km northwest of Brisbane. The park covers several continental islands a short distance offshore including Long Island, Tancred Island, Repair Island, Planton Island, Goat Island, Denman Island and the majority of North Molle Island, Mid Molle Island and South Molle Island. The park features white sandy beaches, open eucalypt forests, rainforest-clad gullies and grasslands. The traditional owners of the islands were the Ngaro people.

== Environment ==
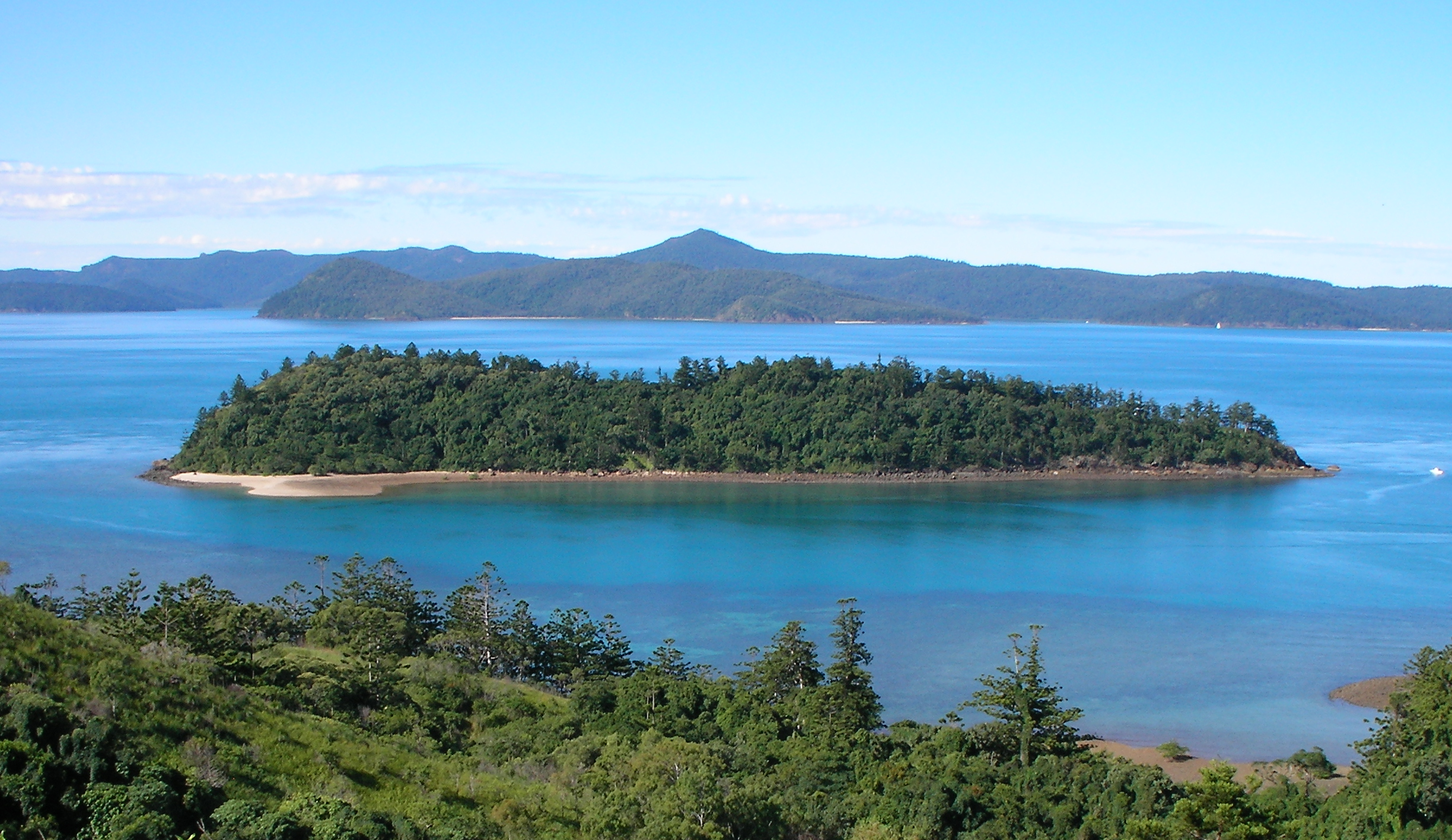
Planton Island, 2007

211 different species have been identified in Molle Islands National Park. This includes two vulnerable species, the coastal sheath-tailed bat and the beach stone-curlew.

== Transport ==
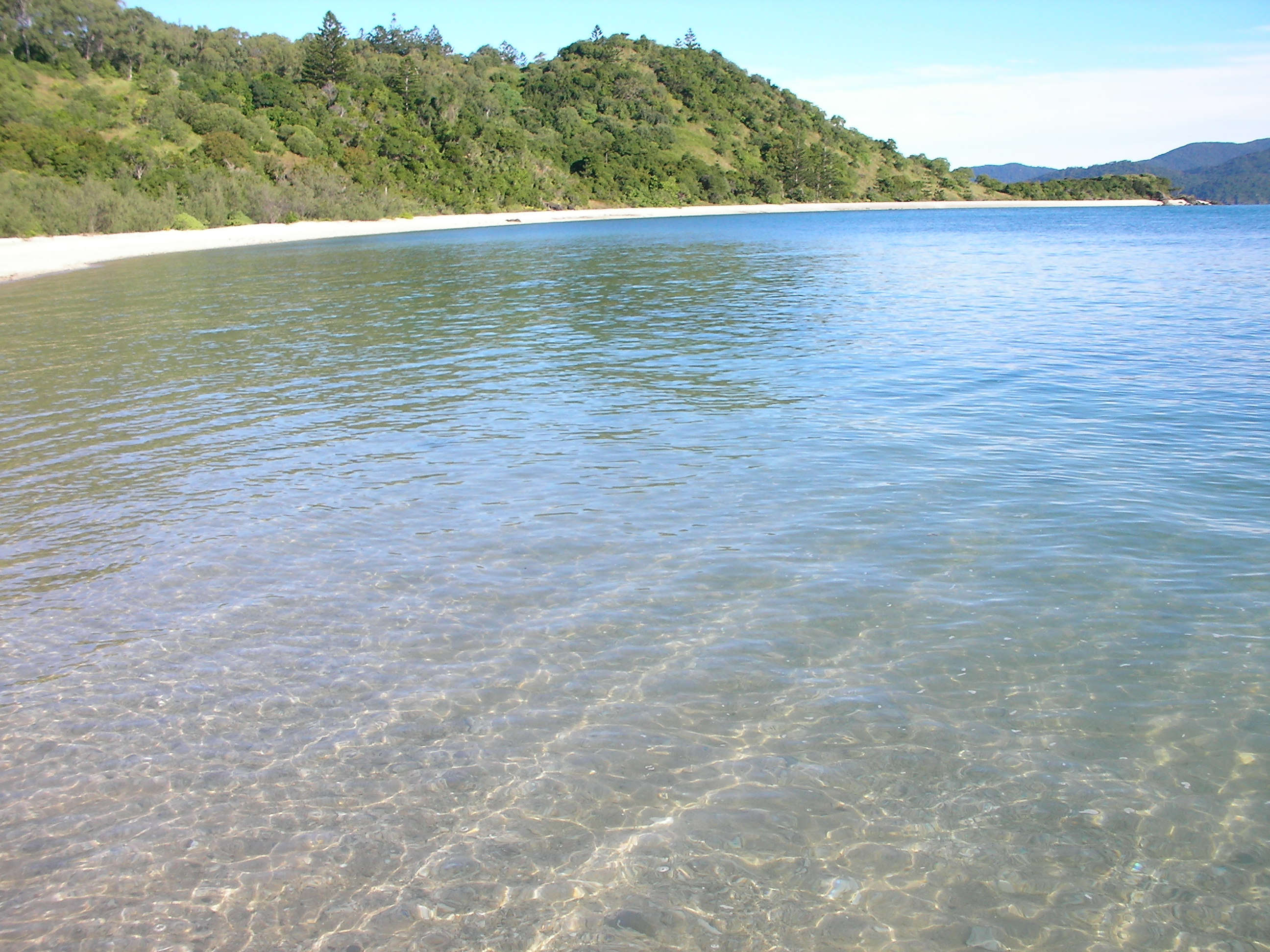
Sandy Bay, South Molle Island, 2007

On South Molle Island and Long Island there are marked walking tracks. The park is accessed by boat from Airlie Beach or Shute Harbour. Tour operators provide day tours and ferry transfer is available from nearby resort islands.

== See also ==
- Protected areas of Queensland
