= Lindeman Islands National Park =

National park in Australia

- IUCN category II (national park)
- Location within Queensland
- Location: Queensland
- Coordinates: 20°28′30″S 149°05′13″E
- Area: 33.10 km^{2} (12.78 sq mi)
- Governing body: Queensland Parks and Wildlife Service

Lindeman Islands National Park is a national park covering the Lindeman Islands in Queensland, Australia, 885 km northwest of Brisbane.

== See also ==
- Protected areas of Queensland
