= Daydream Island =

Island in Queensland, Australia

Coordinates: 20.2567°S 148.814°E

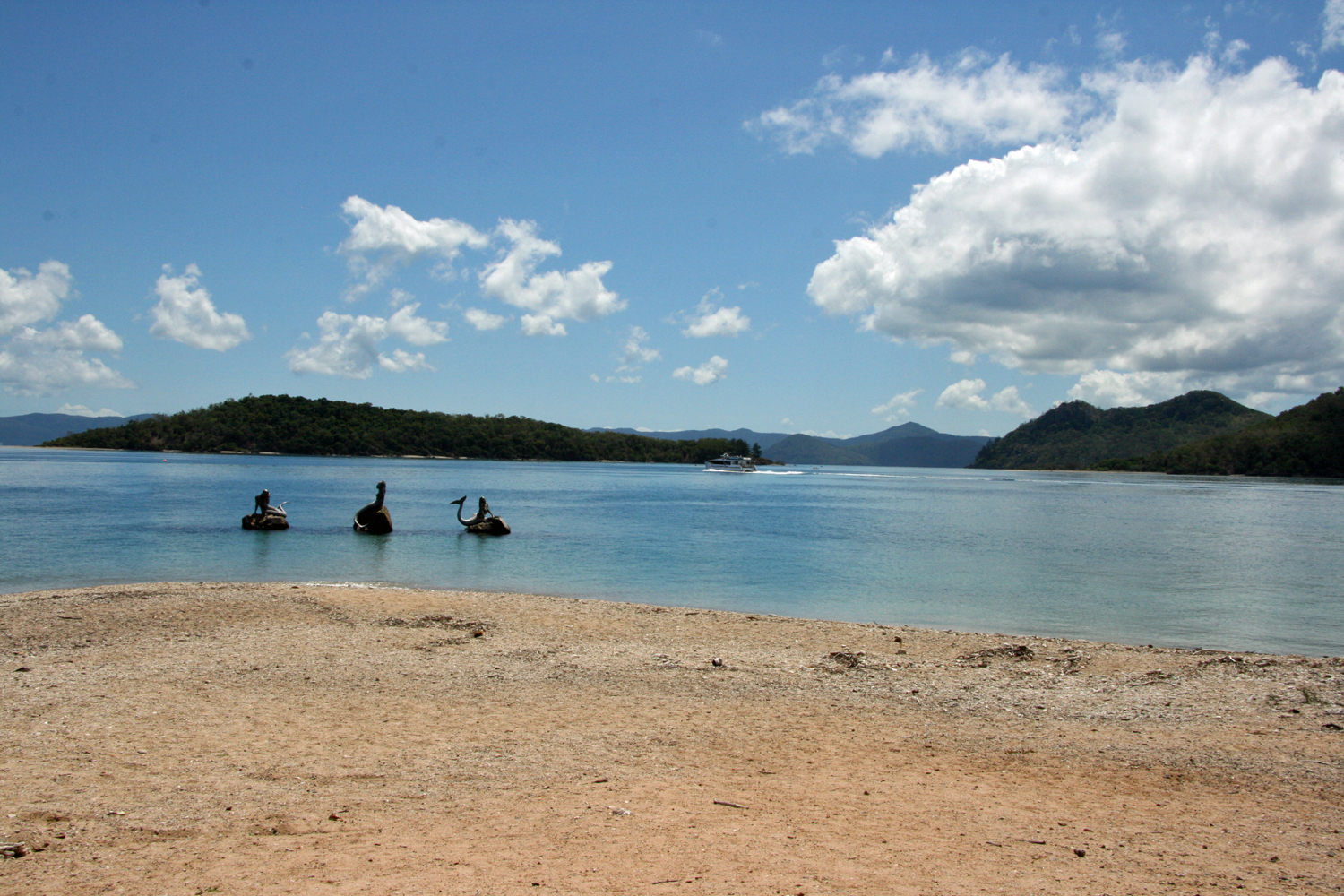
- Mermaid statues at Mermaids Beach
- Interactive map of Daydream Island

Geography
- Location: Queensland, Australia
- Archipelago: Molle Islands
- Length: 1 km (0.6 mi)
- Width: 0.4 km (0.25 mi)
- Highest elevation: 51 m (167 ft)

Administration
- Australia
- State: Queensland
- LGA: Whitsunday Region

Daydream Island is one of seven islands of the Molle Group, a sub-group of the Whitsunday Islands in Queensland, Australia. The island is small, measuring 1 km in length and 400 m at its widest point. The highest point on the island is 51 metres above sea level.

There are two tourist resorts on the island: the original resort at the southern end and a newer resort at the north-eastern end. The original resort caters to day visitors and the newer resort, which opened in 1990, caters to overnight guests. Tourists from the mainland port of Abel Point Marina regularly visit the island.

It is owned by China Capital Investment Group as of March 2015.

== History ==
Named West Molle Island in 1881, the present name "Daydream" came into use during the 1930s when Lee (Paddy) Murray, his wife Connie Murray and their best friend Charlie Hird established the first tourist resort on the island. Day Dream was the name of a yacht owned by the Murrays. Ownership of the resort has transferred to a number of individuals or groups since the 1930s. Notable owners include Reg Ansett, who dismantled the resort in 1953 and shipped the buildings to his new resort on Hayman Island; and Bernie Elsey, whose massive redevelopment of the island in 1967 was destroyed by Cyclone Ada three years later. The resort was previously owned by Vaughan Bullivant.

The name West Molle Island was officially discontinued in 1989.

== Attractions ==
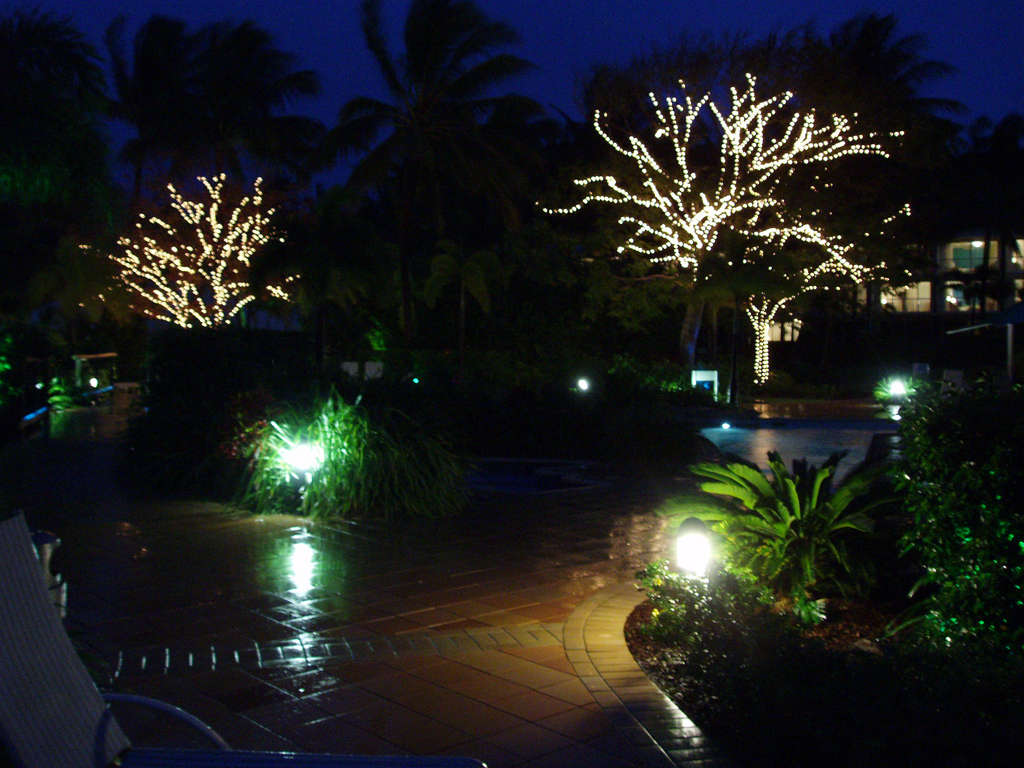
Resort pool area by night, 2005

Daydream Island is a popular destination for sailing enthusiasts. It has an outdoor aquarium, with sea life from the Great Barrier Reef. The aquarium has about 80 different types of sea life and about 50 different corals. Wallaroos roam around outside the resort by the beach. It is a short ferry ride from Great Barrier Reef airport on Hamilton Island to Daydream Island, and also just 30 minutes away by boat to Airlie Beach. Activities like snorkeling, sail-boarding, jet-skiing, parasailing, coral viewing, scuba diving, volleyball, tennis, and badminton are popular.

== Redevelopment ==
On 25 January 2017 Daydream Island announced a $50 million renovation. The island closed in February 2018 with the Fish Bowl, Bake House and Shops on the southern end closing in February 2017 for renovations to the lagoon outside the Fish Bowl. The island reopened after renovations were completed in June 2019.

== Cyclone Debbie ==
Daydream island was significantly damaged by Cyclone Debbie in 2017, with the main jetty being washed away, Lovers Cove deck destroyed, the roof of the day spa ripped off, and power, water and telecommunications lost. Evacuation was completed with the assistance of Cruise Whitsundays and the Royal Australian Navy. The schedule for previously-planned renovations was accelerated as a result, with most repairs being completed as of 2019.

== See also ==
- List of islands of Australia
