= Dent Island (Queensland) =

Island just off the coast of Queensland, Australia

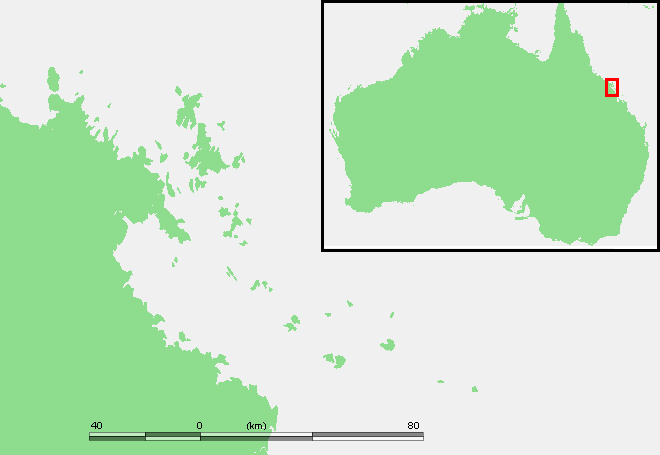

Geography
- Location: Coral Sea
- Coordinates: 20°21′S 148°56′E
- Archipelago: Whitsunday Islands

Administration
- Australia

Dent Island is an island just off the coast of Queensland, Australia. Dent Island is located at 20°21′S 148°56′E. Dent Island is part of the Whitsunday Group and lies immediately west of Hamilton Island. The Whitsunday Group is one of the Island Groups that together comprise the Whitsunday Islands (also known as the Greater Whitsunday Islands or Greater Whitsundays).

The earliest charts of the Whitsunday area showed only one island, named 'Passage Island' where Dent Island and Hamilton Island currently lie. It was not until 1866, when Commander G. S. Nares, Royal Navy, on HMS Salamander, carried out a detailed survey of the northern waters of the Whitsunday Passage that the charts were amended to show two separate islands. Dent Island was named after Lieutenant Albert Dent of HMS Salamander.

Another small mangrove island in Queensland is known locally as "Dent Island", It is located in the Proserpine River just downstream of the mouth of Saltwater Creek. It was given the name after the 33-ton steamer Ada Dent, which shipwrecked and sank in deep water off Lady Elliot Island on 21 June 1907.

Construction of the Hamilton Island Golf Club was completed on Dent Island and it was open to play from August 2009. This 18 hole golf course is operated by Hamilton Island. Designed by five times British Open winner Peter Thomson, the championship Par 71 course measures 6,715 yards (6,140 m). Accessed by boat transfer from Hamilton Island it is billed as the only championship island golf course in Australia.

== Lighthouse ==
In 1879 as part of a Government programme of improving navigational aids along the Queensland coast, a lighthouse was erected on the island, the first in the area. The lighthouse was converted to solar power in 1981 and destaffed in 1987.

== See also ==
- List of islands of Australia
