= South Molle Island =

Island in Queensland, Australia

Coordinates: 20°14′58.45″S 148°49′48.91″E

Native name: Whyrriba
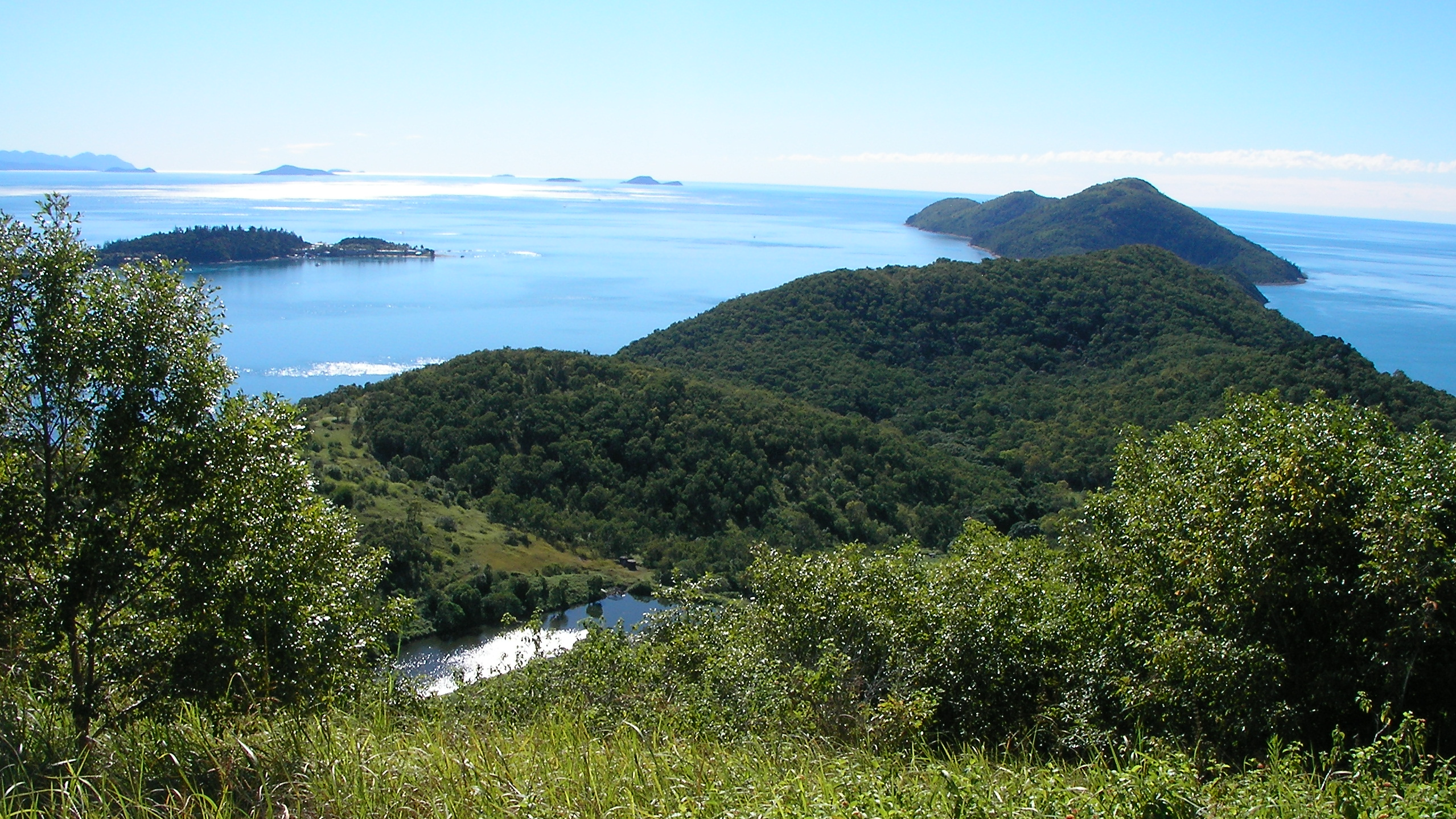
- Looking northwest from west of Mount Jeffreys. Daydream (left) and North Molle (right) are visible in the distance.
- Interactive map of South Molle Island

Geography
- Location: Coral Sea
- Archipelago: Whitsunday Islands
- Total islands: 1
- Major islands: 1
- Area: 4.66 km^{2} (1.80 sq mi)
- Length: 3.2 km (1.99 mi)
- Width: 2.6 km (1.62 mi)
- Highest elevation: 194 m (636 ft)
- Highest point: Mount Jeffreys

Administration
- Australia
- State: Queensland
- Local government area: Whitsunday Region
- Capital city: Bauer Bay
- Largest settlement: Bauer Bay (pop. 0)

Demographics
- Population: 0 (2018)

Additional information
- Time zone: AEST (UTC+10)

South Molle Island, part of the Whitsunday Islands, is a resort island in the Whitsunday section of the Great Barrier Reef Marine Park in Queensland, Australia. The hilly island has numerous bays and inlets accessible by 16 km of walking and cycling tracks, with most protected in the Molle Islands National Park.

The islands were named by Lieutenant Charles Jefferys in 1815 after Colonel George James Molle, the then Lieutenant Governor of New South Wales. Nearby islands include Mid Molle, North Molle and West Molle (known as Daydream Island). Just to the east and southeast, respectively, are the small islands Planton and Denman. Wild goats were introduced to the island in the nineteenth century as a food source for shipwrecked sailors.

== Tourism ==
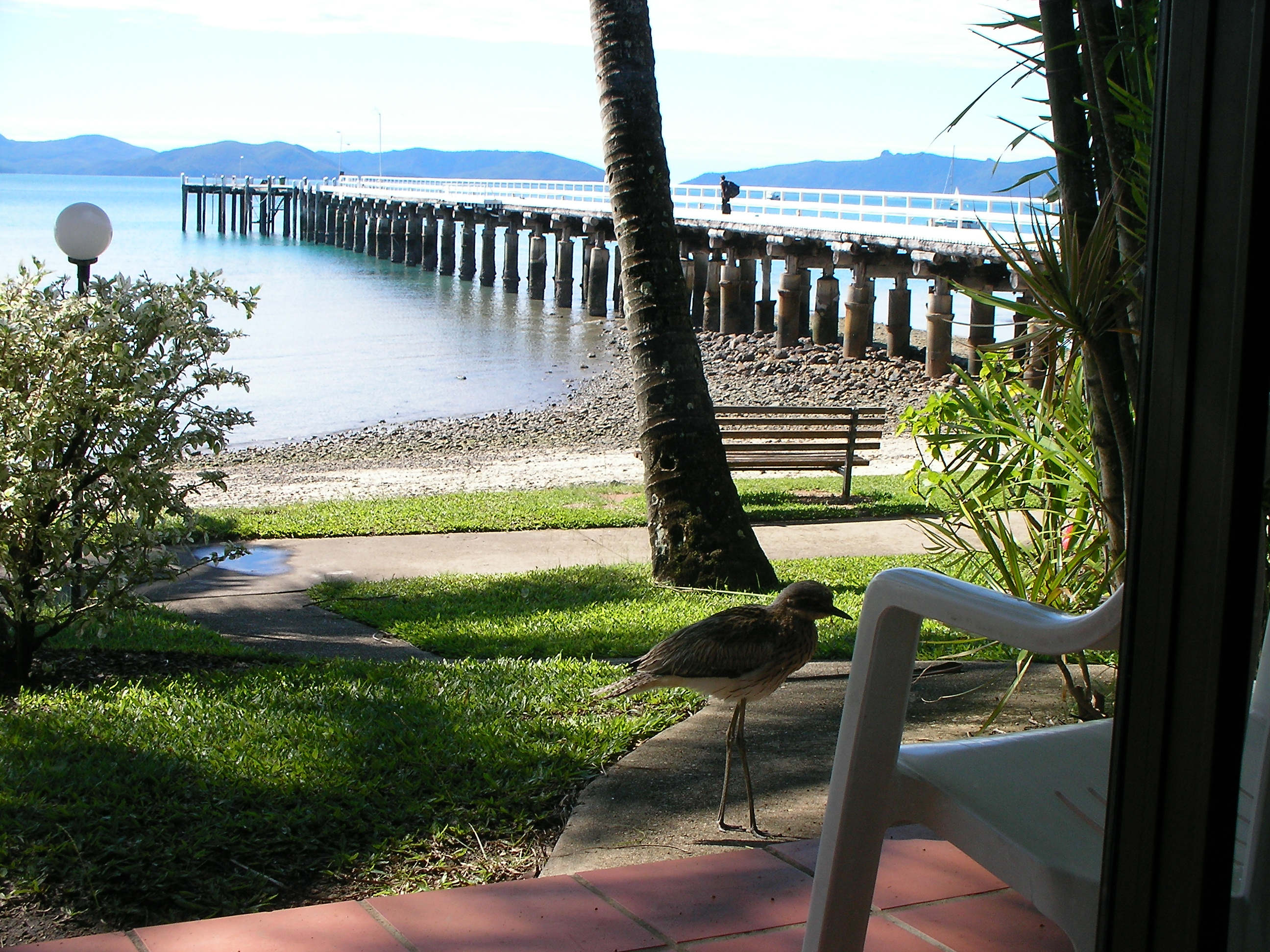
South Molle Island jetty

First established in 1937, the island's resort lies on Bauer Bay on the northern end of the island and so is well protected from the prevailing south-easterly winds. The resort area, now known as South Molle Island Resort, is owned by Koala Adventures and has a nine-hole golf course in addition to 200 rooms that can accommodate 600 guests. In 1961 a large jetty was built as the small jetty that existed was only usable at high tide.

Popular hiking and cycling trips include the walk to Mount Jeffreys in the southern half of the island, from which one can continue southwest to Sandy Bay.

The operating rights to the South Molle Island resort were acquired by Ansett Transport Industries in 1986. At the time, Ansett was half owner of Hamilton Island Airport which provided a strong stream of tourists to South Molle. Bauer Bay holds a seaplane base.

In 2016, the island was bought by a Chinese company, but was destroyed by Cyclone Debbie only a few months later. As of 2019, the resort remains closed and in disrepair.

== History ==
There is some evidence that Aboriginals visited the island to extract hard stone for their weapons. The islands' first pastoral lease was granted in 1883. It was owned by the Bauer family since around 1920 and primarily used for sheep and cattle grazing until a resort was built in the 1950s. In 1970, Cyclone Ada destroyed the island's resort. Coca-Cola filmed a TV commercial on the island.

== Settlement ==
Housing for the resort staff and the personnel from the seaplane base is located at the jetty on Bauer Bay.

== See also ==
- List of islands of Australia
