= Whitsunday Islands =

Island group in Queensland, Australia

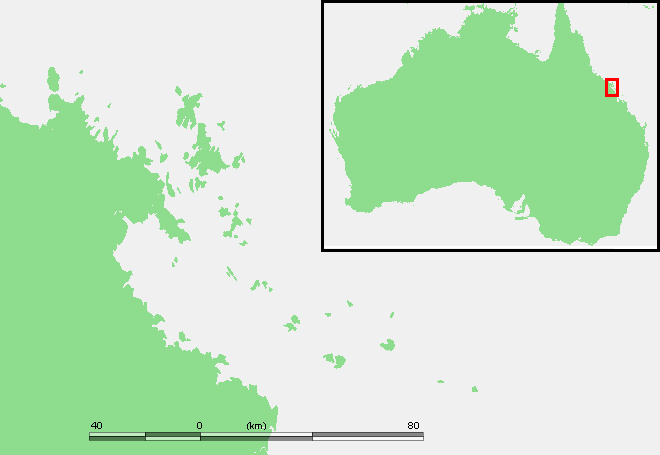

Geography
- Location: Queensland, Australia
- Coordinates: 20°18′S 148°56′E
- Total islands: 74
- Major islands: Hamilton Island
- Area: 282.82 km^{2} (109.20 sq mi)

Administration
- Australia
- State: Queensland
- Largest settlement: Hamilton Island (pop. 1350)

Demographics
- Population: 1,570 (2014)
- Pop. density: 5.551/km^{2} (14.377/sq mi)

The Whitsunday Islands are 74 continental islands of various sizes off the central coast of Queensland, Australia, 900 kilometres (560 miles) north of Brisbane, which are part of the traditional lands and waters of the Ngaro and Gia peoples.

== Geography ==
The northernmost of the islands are off the coast by the town of Bowen, while the southernmost islands are off the coast by Proserpine. The island group is centred on Whitsunday Island, while the commercial centre is Hamilton Island.

The islands are within the locality of Whitsundays and the local government Whitsunday Region.

== Naming ==
On Sunday 3 June 1770, (the day Whitsun—Pentecost was celebrated on the Christian calendar) Captain James Cook sailed his ship H.M.B. Endeavour, through a broad expanse of islands which provided an unimpeded passage to the north. Cook named the passage "Whitsundays' Passage". Cook's recorded times and dates are often questioned. Time quoted is simply local time (calculated at noon), the date recorded is a little more confusing. Cook recorded nautical time (the day starts at noon). Considering the International Date Line, and knowing today's date on the east coast of Australia is calculated at GMT+10, Cook's recorded date is fortuitously correct.

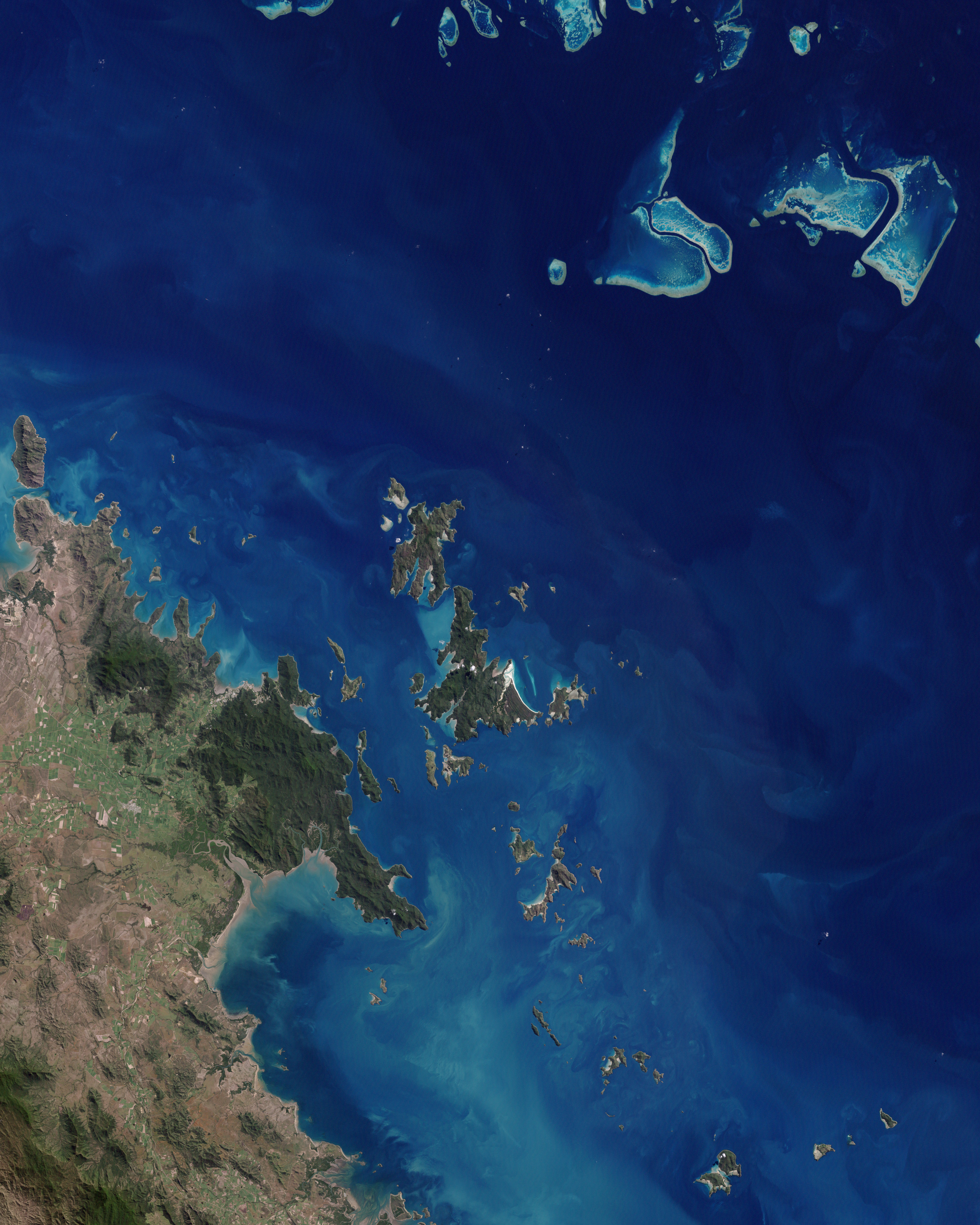
Whitsunday Islands

There is some contention as to exactly which islands are within the informally named Whitsunday Islands, in particular those at the southern extremity and the inclusions to the west. What is certain is that they lie within the chain named Cumberland Isles by Captain Cook (now officially the Cumberland Islands) and a reasonably defined section of that chain and surrounding waters have become known worldwide as The Whitsundays, based on a contraction of the Whitsunday Islands designation.

== History ==
The traditional owners of the area are the Ngaro people and the Gia people, whose Juru people has the only legally recognised native title in the Whitsunday Region. The Whitsundays were the traditional homelands of Ngaro and Gia (Juru) people, an Aboriginal Australian group, also called 'canoe people'.

In 2009, as part of the Q150 celebrations, the Whitsunday Islands became one of the Q150 Icons of Queensland for their role as a natural attraction.

== Tourism ==
The Whitsunday islands are a popular tourist destination for travellers to Queensland and the Great Barrier Reef with the area being one of the most popular yachting destinations in the Southern Hemisphere. The islands received about 700,000 visitors between March 2008 and March 2009.

The Whitsunday Ngaro Sea Trail is a mix of seaways and short walks, crossing South Molle, Hook and Whitsunday islands. The tracks across the islands are linked by seaways suited to kayaking, sailing or powerboating. Camping is available at eight camping areas on the three islands. Several islands have large resorts, offering a wide variety of accommodation and activities. Chartering a yacht or bareboating is a popular way to explore the seaways, beaches and coves.

The Ngaro Whitsundays Underwater Art Trail is a series of sculptures of Turtle, Manta ray, Maori wrasse, Coral polyp and a traditional piece named Bywa. They are located in shallow water depths accessible for snorkelling.

== Components ==
There are a total of 74 islands and islets among all the groups in the Whitsundays.

=== Whitsunday group ===
The most notable islands in the main Whitsunday group are named Dent, Hamilton, Hayman, Hook and Whitsunday which features the white sands of Whitehaven Beach.

=== Lindeman group ===
The best known island in the Lindeman group is its namesake Lindeman Island (20.4456°S 149.0425°E). However the largest island in the group is Shaw Island (20.4867°S 149.0756°E).

=== Molle group ===
The most notable islands in the Molle group are Daydream Island (formerly West Molle Island), Long Island and South Molle Island.

=== Northern group ===
Some of the islands in the Northern group are Armit, Gloucester and Saddleback.

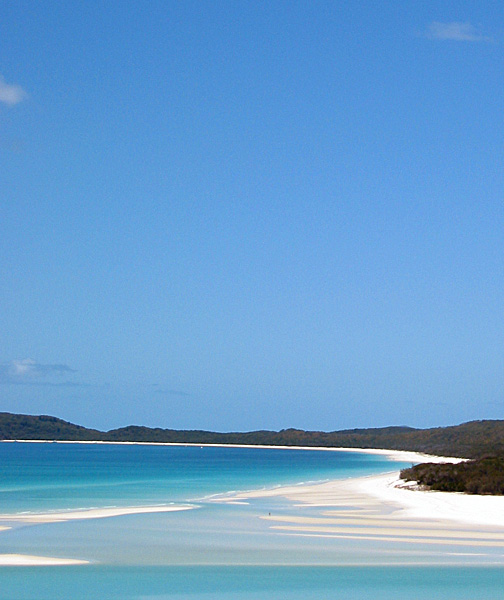
Whitehaven Beach on Whitsunday Island

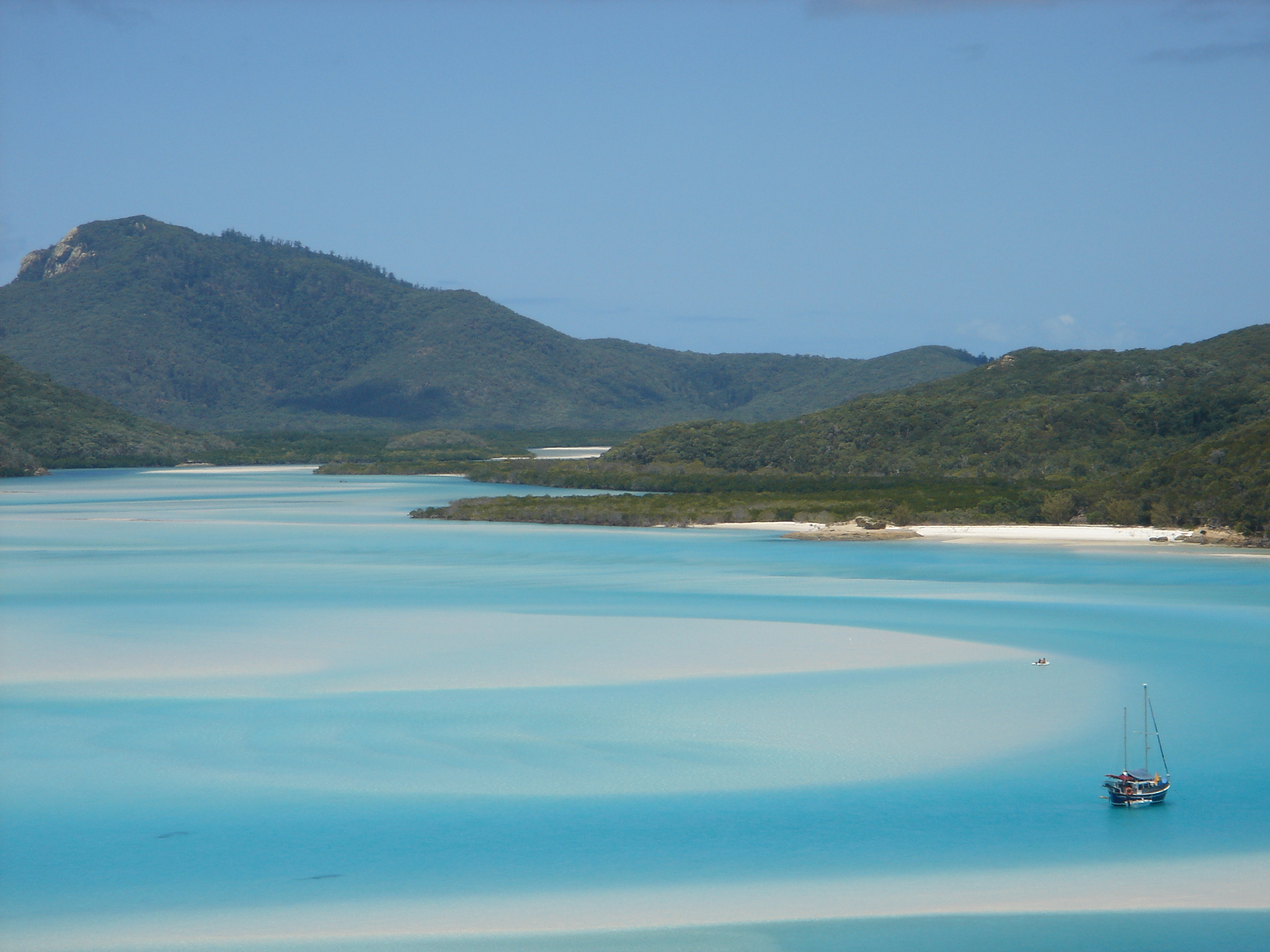
Hill inlet, north of Whitehaven Beach

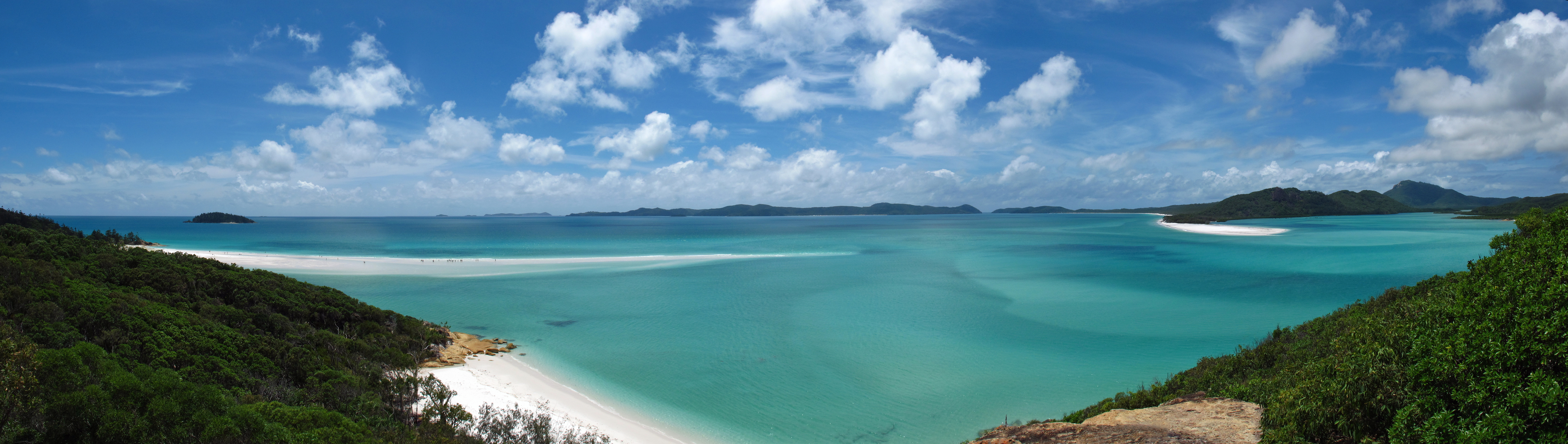
Panoramic view of the Whitsunday Islands

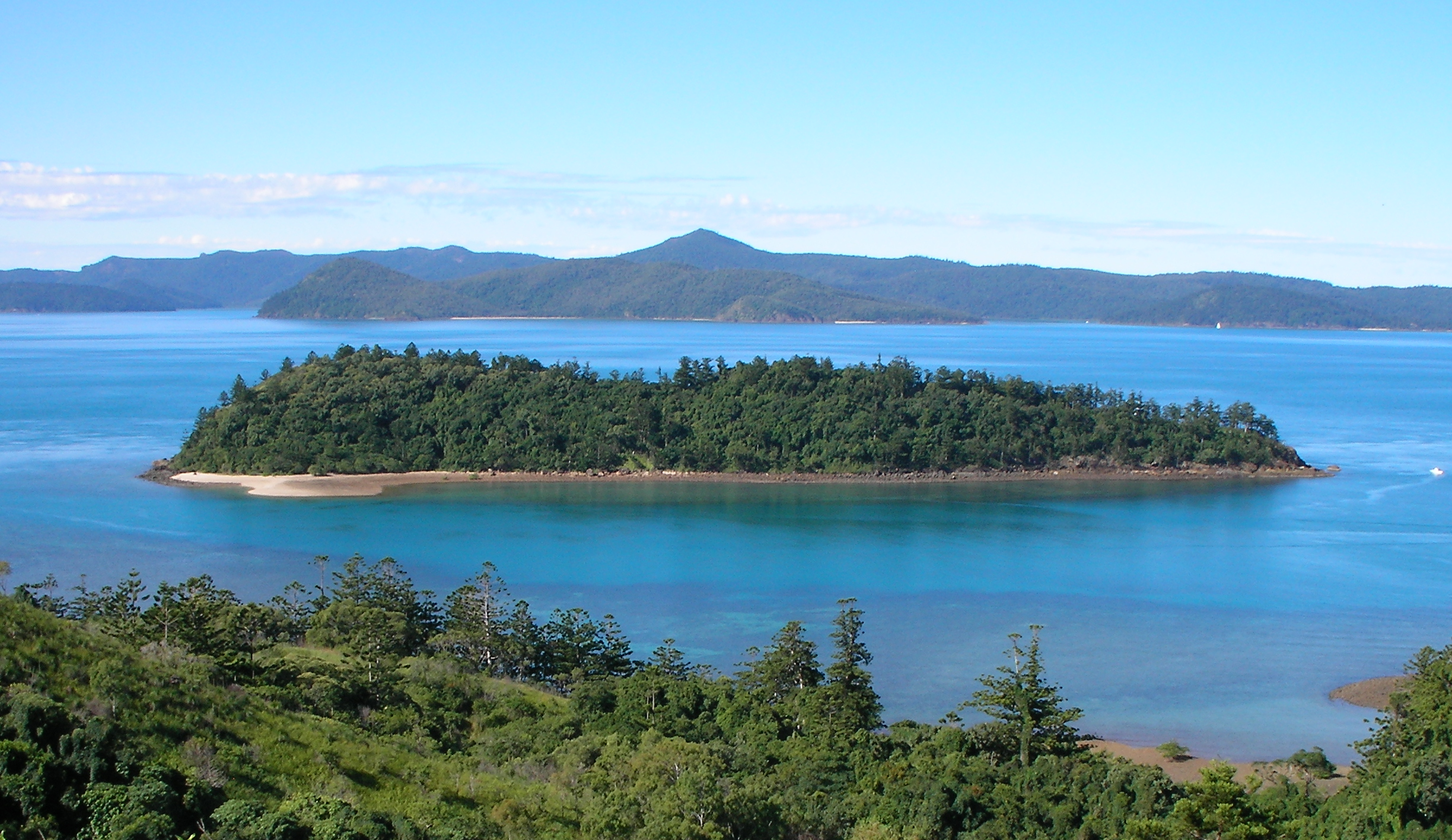
Planton Island

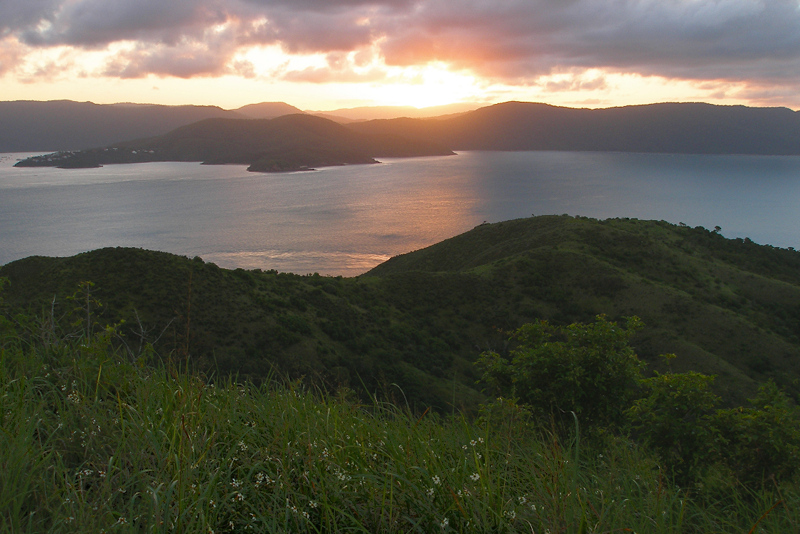
Sunset over mainland from summit of South Molle Island's Mount Jeffreys

== Table of islands ==
Listed below are islands of The Whitsundays, divided by group locality. Named rocks and islets can be found listed within the entry for the nearest island to that feature.

Island	Capital	Adjacent islets and features	Area (km²)	Population
Lindeman Islands	Lindeman Island		30.34	10
Baynham Island			0.074	0
Comston Island			0.236	0
Gaibirra Island			0.323	0
Keyser Island			0.577	0
Lindeman Island			6.789	10
Little Lindeman Island			0.49	0
Maher Island		Jesus Point	0.94	0
Mansell Island			1.177	0
Other		Ann Island, Cole Island	0.222	0
Pentecost Island			1.25	0
Seaforth Island		North Beach	0.265	0
Shaw Island		Neck Bay, Burning Point	15.62	0
Thomas Island		Thomas Bay, Dead Dog Point	2.23	0
Triangle Island			0.115	0
Volskow Island			0.032	0
Molle Islands	South Molle Island		20.17	150
Daydream Island		Coral Beach, Lovers Beach, Mermaids Beach, Sunset Beach	0.23	30
Denman Island			0.095	0
Goat Island			0.047	0
Long Island		Base Point, Fire Point, Happy Bay, Paradise Bay, Pelican Beach, Peppers Palm Bay, Sandy Bay, Spit Point	10.6	80
Mid Molle Island			0.13	0
North Molle Island			2.643	0
Other		Gunn Island, Repair Island, Shute Island, Tancerd Island	0.588	0
Pine Island			1.063	0
Planton Island			0.114	0
South Molle Island		Bauer Bay	4.66	40
Northern Group	Gloucester Island		33.56	1
Armit Island			1.05	0
Double Cone Island			0.4	0
Eshelby Island			0.13	0
Gloucester Island			26.8	0
Grassy Island			1.29	0
Gumbrell Island			0.47	0
Manta Ray Island			0.32	0
Middle Island			0.43	0
Olden Island			0.43	0
Poole Island			0.19	0
Rattray Island			0.23	0
Saddleback Island			0.58	0
Stone Island			1.24	1
The Whitsunday Group	Hamilton Island		198.75	1409
Bird Island			0.017	0
Black Island			0.05	0
Border Island		Cateran Bay	3.066	0
Cid Island		Bench Point, Gilling Point	2.95	0
Cowrie Island			0.024	0
Deloraine Island			0.172	0
Dent Island			4.13	2
Dumbell Island			0.141	0
Dungarra Island			0.094	0
Esk Island			0.1	0
Fitzalan Island			0.054	0
Hamilton Island		Crab Bay, South Head, Driftwood Bay, Coral Cove, Escape Beach, Broken Point, Sunrise Bay, Hideaway Bay, Catseye Bay, Pebble Beach, Airport Beach	7.98	1350
Harold Island			0.345	0
Haslewood Island			7.941	0
Hayman Island		Dolphin Point, Tower Point, Rescue Beach, Groper Point, Arkhurst Point, Blue Pearl Bay, Royal Hayman Hotel	3.78	50
Henning Island			0.496	0
Hook Island			54.87	5
Ireby Island			0.046	0
Langford Island			0.093	0
Lupton Island			1.05	0
Nicolson Island			0.163	0
Other		Buddibuddi Island, Yuindalla Island, Petrel Island, Arkhurst Island, Plum Pudding Island	0.904	0
Perseverance Island			0.342	0
Teague Island			0.558	0
Titan Island			0.011	2
Whitsunday Island			109	0
Wirrainbeia Island			0.04	0
Workington Island			0.333	0
Whitsunday Islands	Totals		282.82	1570

== See also ==
- List of islands of Australia
- Regions of Queensland
- Tourism in Australia
- Whitsunday Islands National Park
