= Hayman Island =

Island in Queensland, Australia

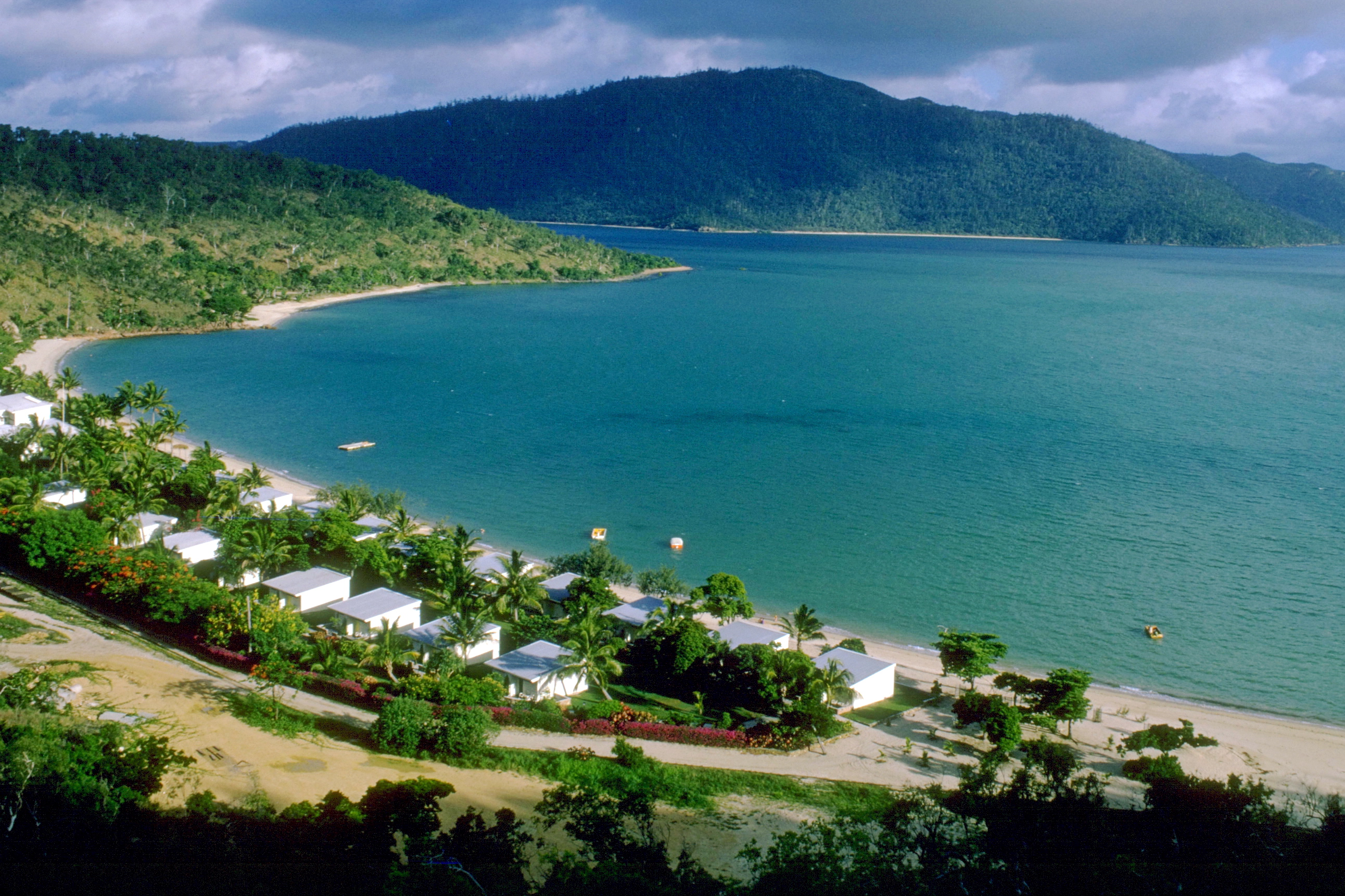
- Hayman Island, 1973

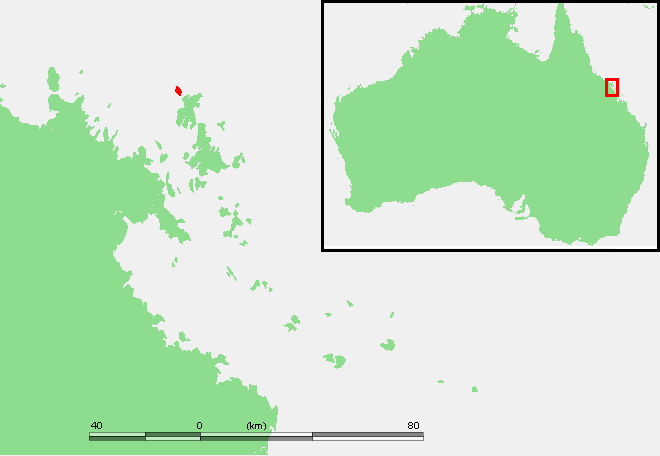

Geography
- Location: Coral Sea
- Coordinates: 20°03′S 148°53′E
- Archipelago: Whitsunday Islands
- Total islands: 74
- Area: 4 km^{2} (1.5 sq mi)
- Length: 4 km (2.5 mi)
- Width: 3 km (1.9 mi)

Administration
- Australia
- State: Queensland
- LGA: Whitsunday Region

Hayman Island is the most northerly of the Whitsunday Islands, off the coast of Queensland, Australia. The island is 294 hectares (726 acres) and lies to the north-west of Hook Island. It is a private island open to the public, most famous for its luxury resort which was built in the 1950s by Ansett Transport Industries. The island is significant for tourism in Queensland. The resort is managed by IHG Hotels & Resorts.

== History ==
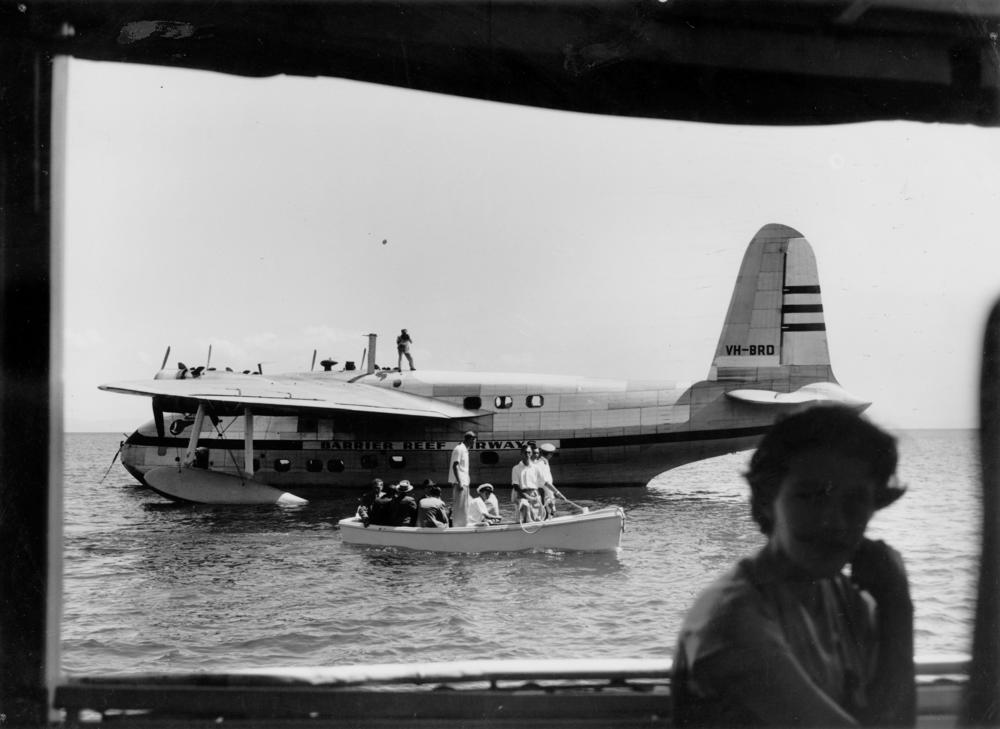
Seaplane at Hayman Island, owned by Barrier Reef Airways, May 1951. Founded after World War II by Captain S. Middlemiss and acquired by Ansett Transport Industries in 1950. A small motor boat is ferrying the passengers to the resort.

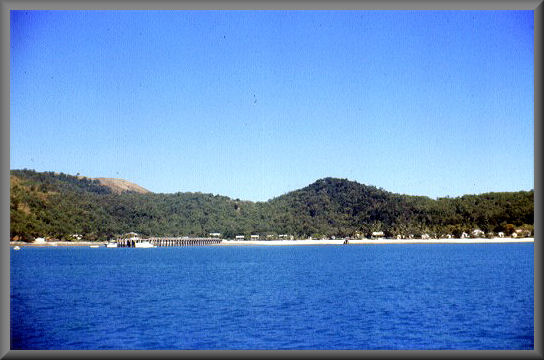
Hayman Island Resort, 1959

The region has been home to the Ngaro Aboriginal people for over 9,000 years, which is one of the earliest recorded Aboriginal groups in Australia.

James Cook first charted these waters on his voyage in 1770.

In 1866, hydrographer Commander George Nares gave Hayman its name in honour of Thomas Hayman, the master of HMS Salamander in which they were travelling. The two carried out many exploits together, becoming the first to pass through the Suez Canal and completing a dangerous navigation around Antarctica.

Edwin Embury, a schoolteacher, dreamer, and amateur scientist established a biological research laboratory on the island in 1933. The abundant wildlife and proximity to the Great Barrier Reef made Hayman an ideal base for scientific discovery.

Map of the Whitsunday Group

Whitsundays' fishermen Bob and Bert Hallam established the Great Barrier Reef Game Fish Angling Club in 1935, attracting local and international game fishing enthusiasts who arrived by coastal steamer. One of them was Zane Grey, American novelist, filmmaker and big game fisherman. Grey planted the first coconut palm on the island and, in 1936, Hayman became the idyllic tropical backdrop for his comedy drama film White Death.

In 1947, Ansett Transport Industries acquired the island. Work began on the Royal Hayman Hotel, which was opened in 1950 by Australian Deputy Prime Minister, Arthur Fadden in anticipation of a royal visit to Australia, for which Hayman was granted a royal charter. Arrival on Hayman was by Catalina and Sandringham flying boat.

Hayman Island State School opened on 26 July 1956 under head teacher Elvira Davies.

In July 1985, a two-year, $300 million project commenced to transform the island into a luxury resort. The works were carried out by Thiess Contractors and in 1987 Hayman was invited to join The Leading Hotels of the World.

In May 1998, Hayman Island was sold to the BT Hotel Group.

The resort undertook another significant renovation in 2001 and received many of its modern five-star luxury amenities. In June 2004, Mulpha Australia acquired Hayman, and, in January 2010, after almost six years of planning, design and environmental consultations, the final approvals were granted. The initial phase of this strategic plan has included revitalisation of the Hayman pool and the construction of luxurious new Kerry Hill designed beach villas. Hayman re-opened on 1 August 2011 after five months of extensive restoration on the island, due to the severe impact of Tropical Cyclone Anthony and Cyclone Yasi earlier that year. This period of closure enabled Hayman to complete the repairs required to landscapes, guest and accommodation areas, activity facilities and essential infrastructure as well as undertake other planned projects.

In the surrounds of the resort, a new botanical garden has some 33,000 new plants and 327 new plant species having been introduced by landscape designer, horticulturalist and personality, Jamie Durie, who was engaged to replant Hayman's 16 hectares of gardens.

=== Climate ===
Hayman Island has a tropical savanna climate (Köppen: Aw) with a hot, rainy season during the summer months and a warm, relatively dry season during the winter months.

Climate data for Hayman Island (20º04'S, 148º53'E, 2 m AMSL) (1969-1985 normals and extremes, rainfall 1934-present)
Month	Jan	Feb	Mar	Apr	May	Jun	Jul	Aug	Sep	Oct	Nov	Dec	Year
Record high °C (°F)	38.6 (101.5)	33.5 (92.3)	34.3 (93.7)	31.6 (88.9)	30.0 (86.0)	28.6 (83.5)	26.8 (80.2)	28.3 (82.9)	31.2 (88.2)	31.0 (87.8)	35.0 (95.0)	34.0 (93.2)	38.6 (101.5)
Mean daily maximum °C (°F)	30.6 (87.1)	30.3 (86.5)	29.6 (85.3)	28.4 (83.1)	26.0 (78.8)	23.4 (74.1)	23.0 (73.4)	24.2 (75.6)	25.9 (78.6)	27.5 (81.5)	29.6 (85.3)	30.5 (86.9)	27.4 (81.4)
Mean daily minimum °C (°F)	24.9 (76.8)	24.9 (76.8)	24.1 (75.4)	22.7 (72.9)	20.4 (68.7)	17.2 (63.0)	16.7 (62.1)	17.4 (63.3)	19.2 (66.6)	21.3 (70.3)	23.4 (74.1)	24.5 (76.1)	21.4 (70.5)
Record low °C (°F)	21.5 (70.7)	21.5 (70.7)	20.4 (68.7)	17.8 (64.0)	12.7 (54.9)	9.8 (49.6)	8.7 (47.7)	11.0 (51.8)	11.9 (53.4)	16.2 (61.2)	19.4 (66.9)	20.2 (68.4)	8.7 (47.7)
Average precipitation mm (inches)	240.3 (9.46)	296.0 (11.65)	226.6 (8.92)	135.6 (5.34)	119.8 (4.72)	54.6 (2.15)	39.1 (1.54)	25.1 (0.99)	16.9 (0.67)	41.7 (1.64)	57.1 (2.25)	120.8 (4.76)	1,406.2 (55.36)
Average precipitation days (≥ 0.2 mm)	12.7	14.5	15.3	14.5	13.0	8.8	6.1	4.5	3.9	5.2	6.1	8.0	112.6
Average afternoon relative humidity (%)	70	73	71	68	71	68	67	64	64	65	66	68	68
Average dew point °C (°F)	23.0 (73.4)	23.4 (74.1)	22.4 (72.3)	20.8 (69.4)	18.8 (65.8)	16.0 (60.8)	15.3 (59.5)	15.5 (59.9)	17.0 (62.6)	18.6 (65.5)	21.2 (70.2)	22.4 (72.3)	19.5 (67.2)
Source: Bureau of Meteorology

== Transport ==
Guests to the island arrive by Hayman's private fleet of luxury motor yachts, and private charter helicopter or Air Whitsunday seaplane.

== Education ==
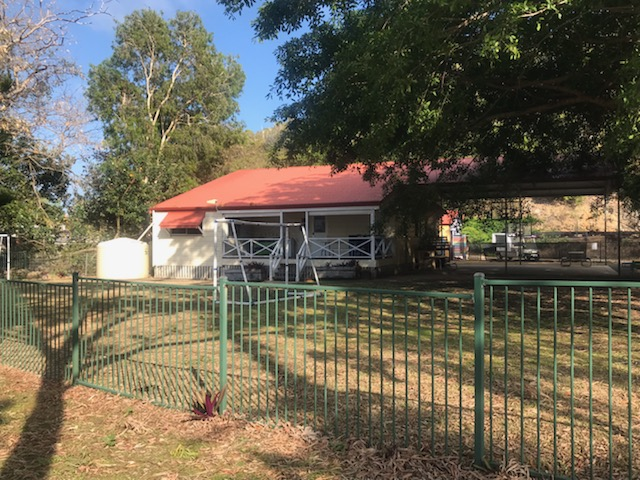
Hayman Island State School, 2024

Hayman Island State School is a government primary (Prep-6) school at Hayman Island (20.0565°S 148.8873°E). The school buildings and grounds are provided and maintained by the resort. It is only for the children of workers and guests on the island. From 2021 to 2023, enrolment numbers ranged from 2 to 8 students. However, the staff turnover on the island also means a high turnover of students, some of them arriving from overseas countries with varying levels of English language skills. As at 2024, it has two teachers, a teaching principal and an early childhood teacher.

There are no secondary schools on Hayman Island nor nearby. Families often leave the island for this reason. Options for those remaining on the island include distance education and boarding school.

== Popular culture ==
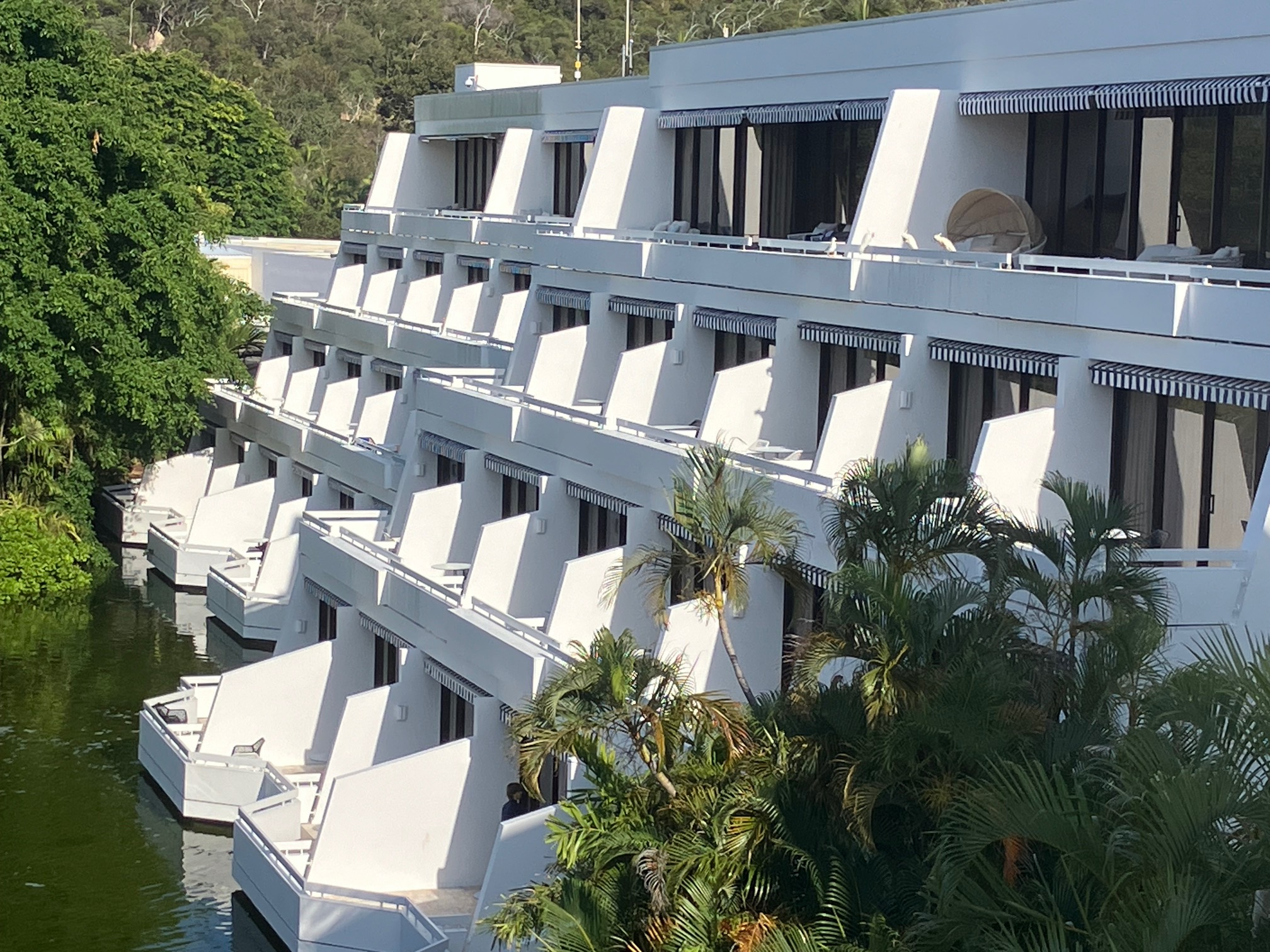
Hayman Island Resort, 2024

Hayman Island contributed to Australian popular culture when the television series Barrier Reef (originally titled Minus Five) was filmed at Hayman Island from September 1969.

In 1972, the first people to row unaided across the Pacific Ocean, Sylvia Cook and John Fairfax, arrived at Hayman Island after spending 361 days crossing the ocean.

In 1995, British Labour Party leader Tony Blair addressed Rupert Murdoch and the leaders of News Corporation at Hayman Island, laying the groundwork for Murdoch's eventual support of the party at the 1997 election.

Notable guests have included Jane Fonda, Bill Gates, Bob Geldof, Anthony Hopkins, Chris Isaak, Nicole Kidman, Kellan Lutz, Slash and Rod Stewart.

== See also ==
- Air Whitsunday
- List of islands of Australia
- Tourism in Australia
