= Hook Island =

Island in Queensland, Australia

Coordinates: 20°07′S 148°55′E

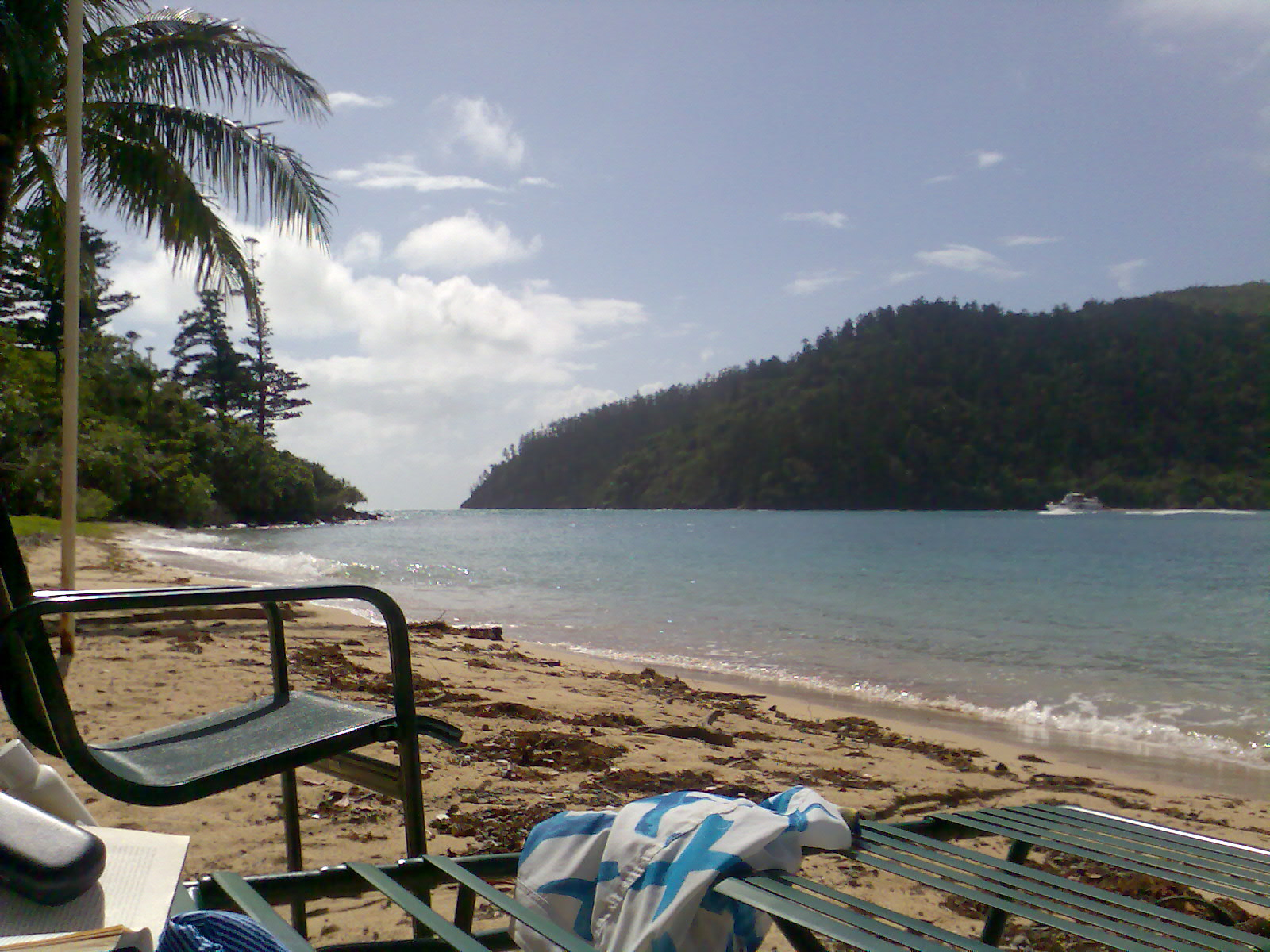
- Hook Island Wilderness Resort's beachfront
- Interactive map of Hook Island

Geography
- Location: Coral Sea
- Archipelago: Whitsunday Islands
- Total islands: 74

Administration
- Australia
- State: Queensland
- Local government area: Whitsunday Regional Council

Hook Island is one of the Whitsunday Islands off the coast of the Australian state of Queensland. The island is almost uninhabited, quite rugged and almost completely contained within a section of the Whitsunday Islands National Park. The island has two prominent geographical features on the southern side of Hook Island; the Nara and Macona inlets, two fjord-like recesses that are used as anchorages for the Whitsunday tourist fleet. The island's northern coast is noted for its colourful underwater coral growths, to which snorkelling and diving enthusiasts are attracted.

In 1964, photos were taken at the islands which circulated globally after what was believed to be some kind of sea monster was visible. The best known of the Hook Island Sea Monster photos is familiar to many (the two or three others are less familiar). It features a gigantic, tadpole-like monster, supposedly encountered in Stonehaven Bay, Hook Island, Queensland, by Robert Le Serrec and his family and a friend during December 1964.

On 12 February 2008 a yacht ran aground at Cape Cove. The yacht became wedged on dangerous rocks requiring the rescue of 37 people by helicopter. The incident was Australia's largest helicopter rescue operation from a vessel. At least two people have died from irukandji jellyfish stings while snorkeling off Hook Island.

Some of the oldest archaeological sites ever found in Eastern Australia are the caves and midden of the Ngaro people on Hook Island. A site at Nara Inlet is the oldest indication of Aboriginal occupation in the Great Barrier Reef Marine Park.

== Hook Island Wilderness Resort ==
The only habitation on Hook Island is the Hook Island Wilderness Resort which formerly offered the most affordable on-land accommodation in the Whitsunday group before its closure. The resort ceased operating in February 2013. The modest and now dilapidated buildings are only occupied by permanent caretaking and security staff and visitors are only permitted on the beach as far as the high water mark.

=== Hook Island Underwater Observatory ===
Constructed in 1966, the Hook Island Underwater Observatory provided an additional tourist attraction to the island. It was closed 2010 following an assessment that found the submarine viewing chamber had insufficient ventilation. Since its closure it fell into disrepair and has since been completely removed and recycled.

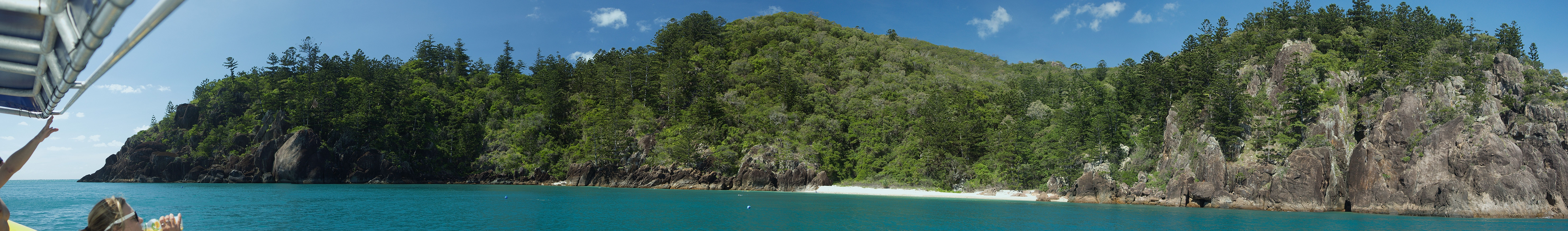
Panorama of Hook Island

== See also ==
- List of islands of Australia
