= Long Island (Whitsunday Islands) =

Island in Queensland, Australia

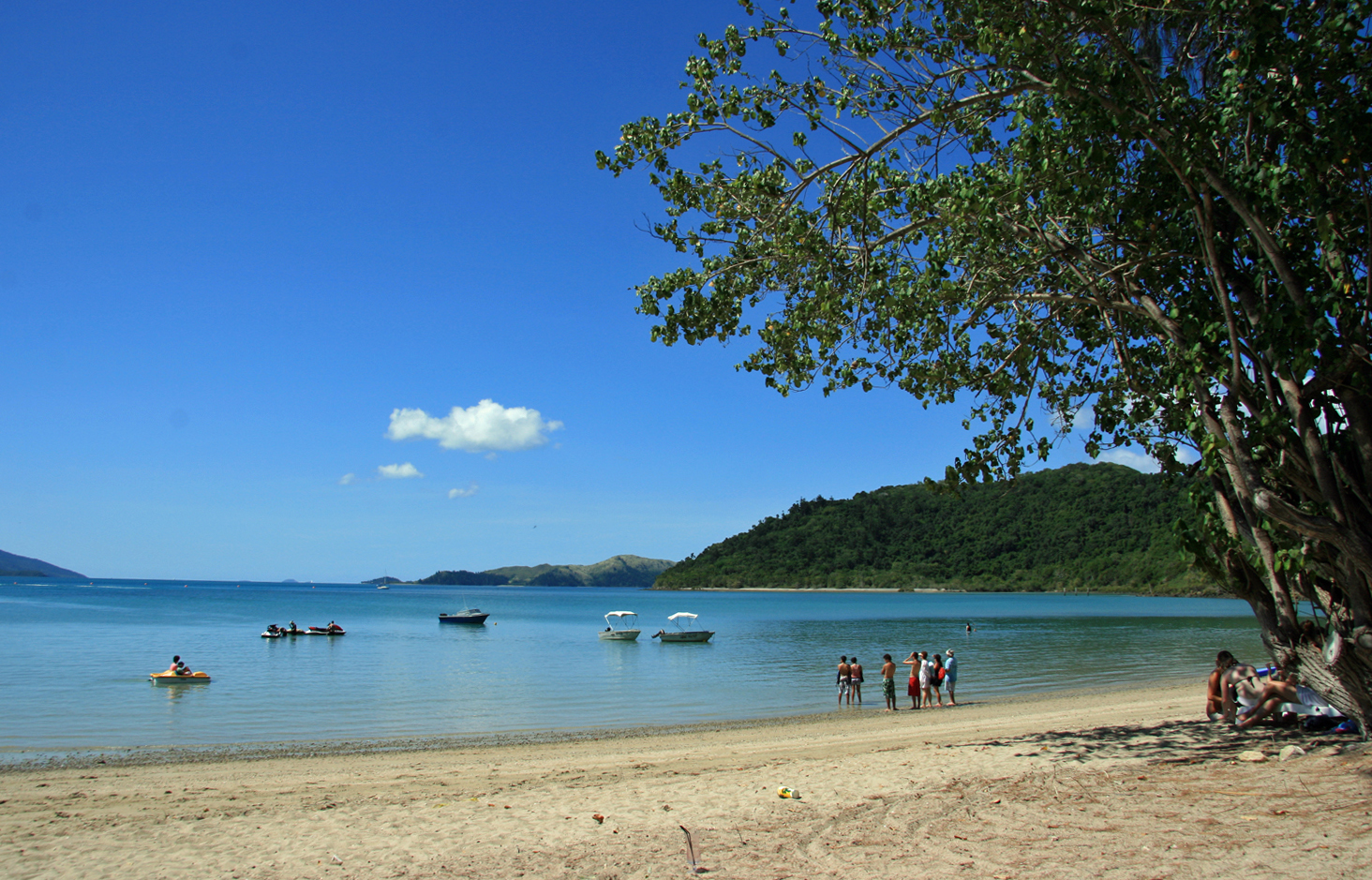
- View of the beach at Long Island in the Whitsunday Islands, Queensland
- Interactive map of Long Island

Geography
- Location: Queensland, Australia
- Coordinates: 20.361°S 148.855°E
- Archipelago: Whitsunday Islands
- Highest elevation: 40 m (130 ft)

Administration
- Australia
- State: Queensland
- LGA: Whitsunday Regional Council

Demographics
- Ethnic groups: Aboriginal

Long Island is a member of the Whitsunday Island group off the east coast of Queensland, Australia. It is 9 kilometres (5.6 mi) in length and is at its widest point only 400 metres (1,300 ft). Long Island is the closest island in the Whitsunday group to the mainland of Australia, being only 1 kilometre (0.6 mi) from the coastline. A boat transfer to the island from Shute Harbour on the mainland takes 20 minutes.

Most of the island is national area, including 2,500 acres (1,012 hectares) of tropical rainforest and 20 kilometres of bush walking paths. There is a coral reef 150 metres (492 ft) offshore.

The island is home to the Palm Bay Resort.
