= Heronvale, Queensland =

Heronvale
- Town
- Interactive map of Heronvale
- Coordinates: 20.1072°S 148.2933°E
- Country: Australia
- State: Queensland
- City: Bowen
- LGA: Whitsunday Region
- Location: 21.4 km (13.3 mi) SSE of Bowen (town); 55.5 km (34.5 mi) NW of Proserpine; 181 km (112 mi) NW of Mackay; 216 km (134 mi) SE of Townsville; 1,268 km (788 mi) NNW of Brisbane

Government
  - State electorate: Burdekin
  - Federal division: Dawson
- Time zone: UTC+10:00 (AEST)
- Postcode: 4805

Heronvale (also known informally as Brisk Bay) is a coastal town in the Whitsunday Region, Queensland, Australia. It is within the locality of Bowen.

== Geography ==
Heronvale is on the south-east coast of the locality of Bowen facing Brisk Bay (20.0934°S 148.2855°E) and Edgecumbe Bay (20.1137°S 148.3902°E).

== History ==
Edgecumbe Bay was named on 4 June 1770 by Lieutenant James Cook on HM Bark Endeavour after George Edgcumbe who had a distinguished career in the Royal Navy and, as a Rear Admiral, was Commander in Chief at Plymouth, England, from 1766 to 1770.

Brisk Bay was named after HMS Brisk on service at the Australia Station from 1864 to 1968.

The town was named on 1 November 1963 by the Queensland Place Names Board.

== Education ==
There are no schools in Heronvale. The nearest government primary and secondary schools are Bowen State School and Bowen State High School in Bowen to the north-west.
