= Bowen Harbour Board Building =

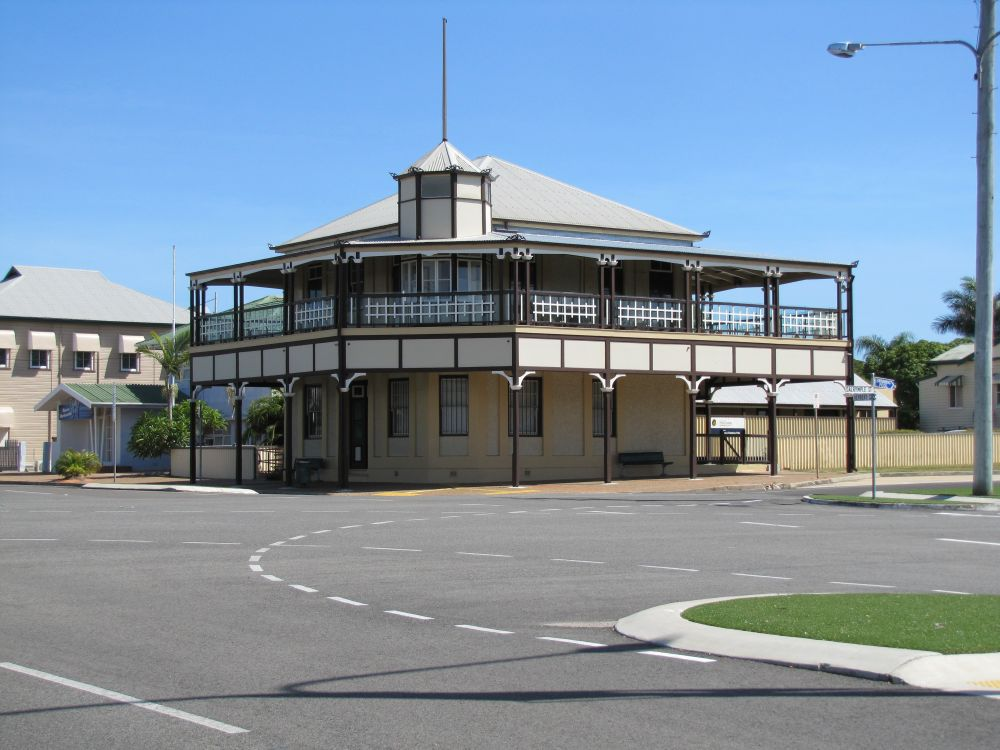
- Bowen Harbour Board Building, 2014

- Location within Queensland Location within Australia
- 20.0151°S 148.2486°E
- Location: 6 Herbert Street, Bowen, Whitsunday Region, Queensland, Australia

History
- Design period: 1919–1930s (interwar period)
- Built: 1921

Queensland Heritage Register
- Official name: Bowen Harbour Board Building (former), Queensland Transport, McDonald Hamilton & Company
- Type: state heritage (built)
- Designated: 21 October 1992
- Reference no.: 600041
- Significant period: 1921 (fabric); 1921–1930, 1931–1985 (historical)

Bowen Harbour Board Building is a heritage-listed office building at 6 Herbert Street, Bowen, Whitsunday Region, Queensland, Australia. It was built in 1921. It is also known as Queensland Transport and McDonald Hamilton & Company. It was added to the Queensland Heritage Register on 21 October 1992.

== History ==
The former Bowen Harbour Board building was constructed in 1921 for Bowen shipping agents McDonald Hamilton & Company.

During the second half of the nineteenth century the expansion of settlement in North Queensland caused increasing problems with the carriage of freight to and from southern supply centres. In response to this problem the New South Wales Government, in 1859 (i.e. prior to the separation of Queensland), offered a reward for the discovery of a suitable harbour north of Port Curtis (Gladstone) that could be more easily accessed by northern settlers. Captain Henry Daniel Sinclair, owner of the Santa Barbara, who in August 1859 departed Sydney in order to locate such a suitable harbour, undertook this mission. On 15 October 1859 Sinclair's party found such a site, and subsequently named it Port Denison. The first settlers began arriving as early as 19 March 1861. The settlement was officially proclaimed on 11 April 1861 (after the separation of Queensland), and named Bowen after the Queensland Governor, Sir George Ferguson Bowen. The township of Bowen quickly grew to support the northern pastoral industry as a strategically placed supply centre and over the course of several decades the town developed into a thriving commercial port.

One contributing factor to the town's success was the management of its harbour, and therefore the efforts of its harbour board. The prospect of an official harbour board was first considered in 1913, when dissatisfaction among the Bowen Chamber of Commerce led to an inquiry into the financial arrangements of the port. The inquiry, dated 27 November 1913, found the current port revenue situation lacking, with the revenue at the time being insufficient to provide for the upkeep of the wharf, let alone improvements. As a result, the Bowen Harbour Board Act of 1914 was gazetted on 1 September 1914. The first meeting of the Board was held on 22 March 1915 in the Bowen Shire Hall, and the Board's by-laws were gazetted on 15 July 1915. Changes made to the system of revenue collection, such as charging for berthage, and changes to the haulage system, quickly resulted in the Harbour Board's revenue substantially increasing, and then annually increasing for a prolonged period thereafter. This in turn allowed further expansion of port facilities through the construction of new cargo sheds and facilities to accommodate the expanding range of export materials.

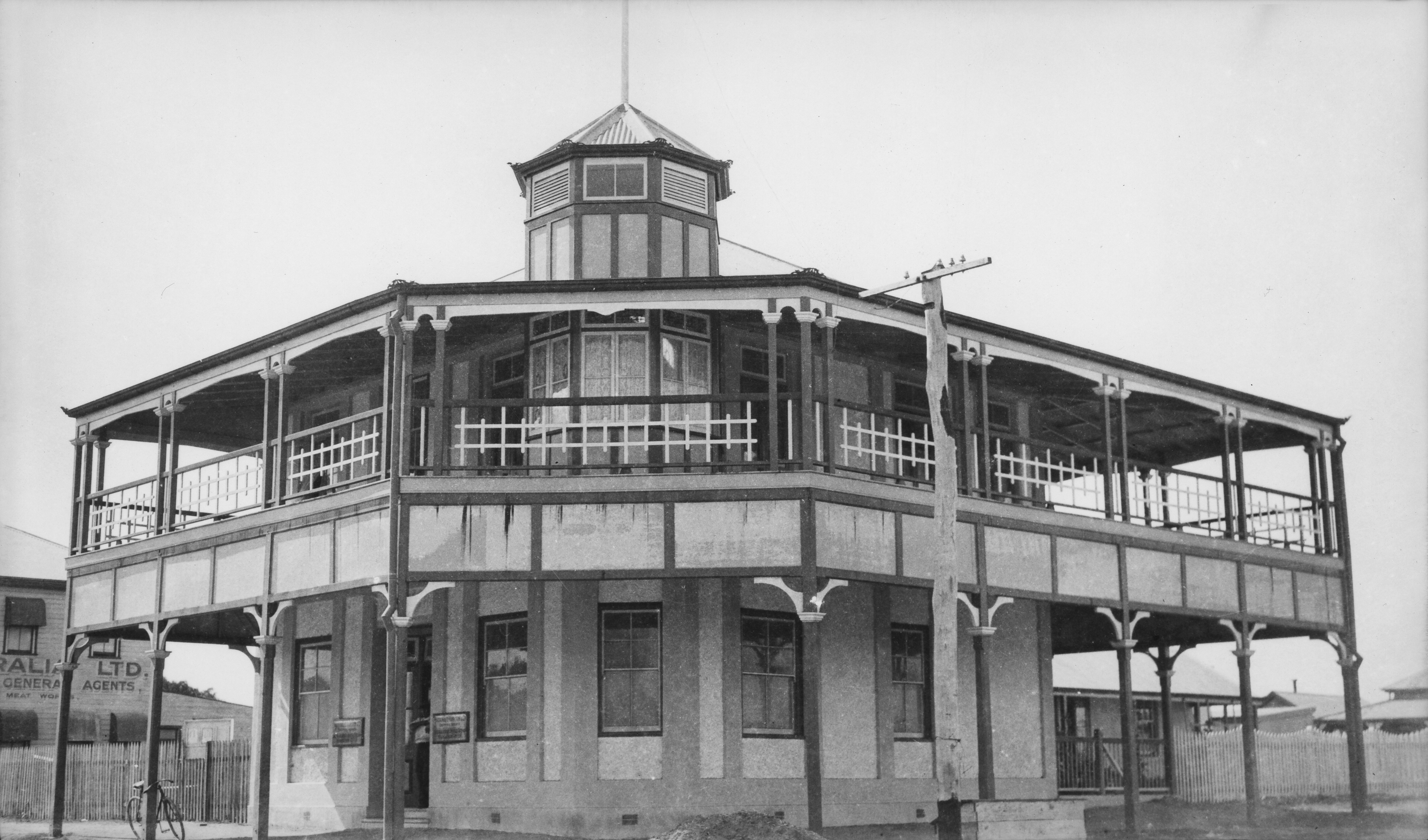
MacDonald Hamilton and Co. offices (later Bowen Harbour Board Building), circa 1921

As the port developed so did the role of the Harbour Board. By 1933 the Board was seeking a new location for its offices. The building selected by the Board was constructed in 1921 for ship owners/agents, MacDonald Hamilton and Co., who occupied the site until closing their business in Bowen in 1930. When the Bank of New South Wales and the Australian Bank of Commerce merged in 1929, they purchased the building. In 1931 they moved back to the original Bank of New South Wales and auctioned the building to the Bowen Harbour Board for £1150. In the same year, the upper floor of the building was leased, for one pound per week, to a Mr A. V. Murrey (the only other bidder at the auction), who was the secretary of Bowen Consolidated Mines, Bowen Salt Ltd., Bowen Fire Brigade and the Bowen Chamber of Commerce. After his death in the 1950s his son Dennie Murray took over the lease, and remained until his death in 1960, at which time he was replaced as secretary by Mr Lew Head.

The Harbour Board building has sustained damage from cyclones on numerous occasions, including damage to its roof in 1959, after which the building was roofed with galvanised iron.

In 1963, Bowen Consolidated Mines moved from the building. They purchased the former Adelaide Steamship Company building next door and relocated. Bowen Salt Ltd. then took over the lease of the upper floor of the former MacDonald Hamilton & Company building until their own office accommodation was provided at the salt works on 23 June 1965.

After Bowen Salt Ltd moved the upper story of the premises remained vacant until 26 July 1967, when the Bowen Historical Society was offered the use of the area at a rental of 20 cents per week. The Society remained there until relocating to their current building in 1979. After this period the upper level of the premises was used variously by shipping agents, a solicitor and the Art's council in the establishment of the Dalrymple Gallery.

The Harbour Board occupied the first floor up until 30 March 1985, at which time the Harbour Board was officially abolished as the port had been superseded by ports such as Townsville and was now obsolete as a commercial port. At this time the building was taken over by the Harbours and Marine Department.

In 1988 the building was restored at an expense of $200,000 to house the Department of Harbours and Marine, and was further renovated in 1994 by Q-Build in conjunction with Project Services in order to add air conditioning and internal fit out.

In February 1998 the Queensland Heritage Council gave approval for the renovation of the ground floor. Works included construction of a new main entry, removal and re-positioning of the existing counter, provision of a new door opening and the provision of a set down area to the footpath on Dalrymple Street for vehicle inspection purposes.

Queensland Transport now occupies the front offices of the building.

== Description ==
The former Bowen Harbour Board Building is located on the corner of Dalrymple Street and Herbert Street, the main street of Bowen. It is on the outskirts of the commercial area, and overlooks Port Denison to the south-east.

It is a two-storeyed masonry building with a hipped corrugated iron roof. A single-storey wing projects from the rear of the building, with gabled roof and brick chimney. There is a timber verandah on the two street sides, which also returns to the rear of the building.

At the corner is a hexagonal turret with a pyramid roof and views over the bay.

The external masonry walls are finished with rough-cast in panels between shallow pilasters. The windows are double-hung timber, with 4-pane upper sashes and 2-pane lower sashes.

The verandah posts have post moulds and brackets, and a fibro valance. The underside of the verandah is corrugated steel.

The original main entrance from Herbert Street is raised several steps above the footpath. Recessed from the alignment the front doors are a pair of half-glazed French doors. A series of French doors provide access from the upper level to the verandah.

The interior features silky oak counter, partitions, cupboards and staircase. The rear door to the stair has coloured glass panels.

A new entrance was installed in 1998. The entrance is through the side facade, off Herbert Street giving wheelchair access.

== Heritage listing ==
The former Bowen Harbour Board Building was listed on the Queensland Heritage Register on 21 October 1992 having satisfied the following criteria.

The place is important in demonstrating the evolution or pattern of Queensland's history.

The former Bowen Harbour Board building, constructed in 1921 for Bowen shipping agents MacDonald Hamilton and Company and occupied by the Bowen Harbour Board for sixty four years, has had a significant association with the development and consolidation of Bowen Harbour. The building has also made a major contribution to the commercial, social and cultural life of Bowen because of the occupation of office space by companies and community organisations such as Bowen Consolidated Mines Ltd, Bowen Salt Works, Bowen Historical Society, and the Arts Council's Bowen Art Gallery.

The place is important because of its aesthetic significance.

The Harbour Board building located close to the harbour in Herbert Street, makes a substantial contribution to the historical commercial streetscape of Bowen. Its two-storey height, verandah detail and the octagonal turret with a pyramid roof make it a feature of the area close to the harbour.

The place has a special association with the life or work of a particular person, group or organisation of importance in Queensland's history.

The building has also made a major contribution to the commercial, social and cultural life of Bowen because of the occupation of office space by companies and community organisations such as Bowen Consolidated Mines Ltd, Bowen Salt Works, Bowen Historical Society, and the Arts Council's Bowen Art Gallery.
