= Styphelia lucens =

Scientific classification
- Kingdom: Plantae
- Clade: Tracheophytes
- Clade: Angiosperms
- Clade: Eudicots
- Clade: Asterids
- Order: Ericales
- Family: Ericaceae
- Genus: Styphelia
- Species: S. lucens

Binomial name
- Styphelia lucens A.R.Bean

Species of shrub

Styphelia lucens is a species of flowering plant in the heath family Ericaceae and is endemic to coastal areas of north Queensland. It is a shrub with densely hairy branches, erect, lance-shaped leaves with the narrower end towards the base, and white, tube-shaped flowers.

== Description ==
Styphelia lucens is a shrub with densely hairy branchlets, that typically grows to a height of 0.5–2 m (1 ft 8 in – 6 ft 7 in). Its leaves are pointed upwards, lance-shaped with the narrower end towards the base, 7–12 mm (0.28–0.47 in) long and 1.3–1.9 mm (0.051–0.075 in) wide on an indistinct petiole. The leaves are concave, and mostly glabrous, the upper surface dark green and shiny and the lower surface pale green and slightly shiny. The flowers are mostly arranged singly or in pairs in upper leaf axils on a peduncle 0.5–1.0 mm (0.020–0.039 in) long, with broadly egg-shaped to more or less round bracts and broadly elliptical bracteoles 1.2–1.6 mm (0.047–0.063 in) long. The sepals are 2.8–3.4 mm (0.11–0.13 in) long and the petals are white, forming a tube 2–3 mm (0.079–0.118 in) long with lobes 2.5–3.2 mm (0.098–0.126 in) long and densely hairy on the inside. Flowering has been observed from March to August and the fruit is an elliptic drupe 2.6–3.4 mm (0.10–0.13 in) long.

== Taxonomy ==
Stypheli lucens was first formally described in 2020 by Anthony Bean in the journal Austrobaileya from specimens collected on the upper slopes of Gloucester Island in 1994. The specific epithet (cognata) means "shining", in reference to it similarity to the glossy leaves of this species.

== Distribution and habitat ==
This styphelia is found in near-coastal areas between Gloucester Island and near Townsville where it grows in shrubland on soils derived from granite, with an outlier near Pentland.
