= Flemington Road Cemetery =

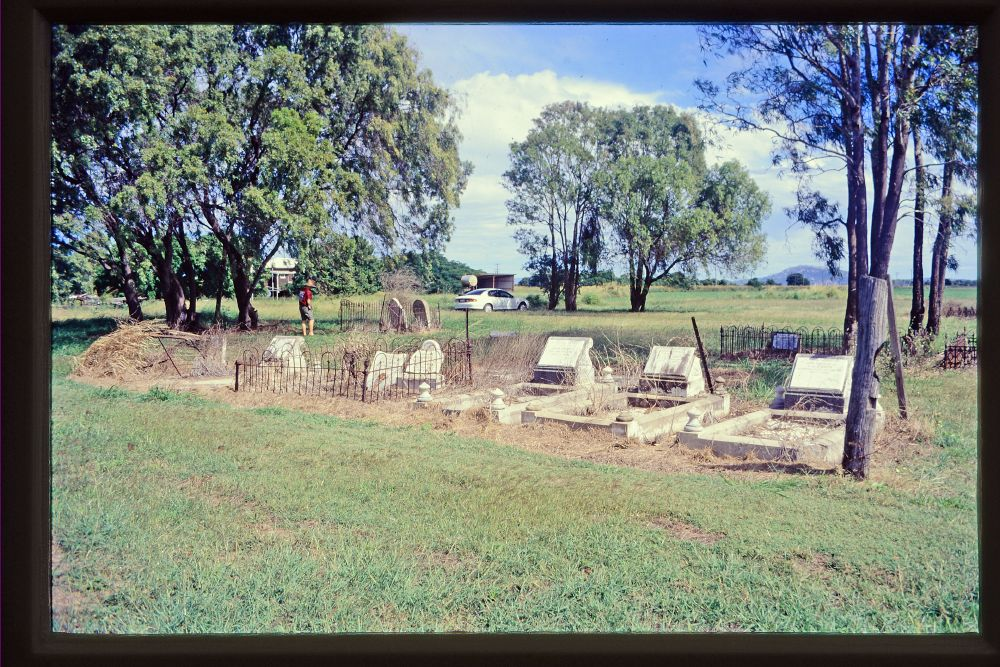
- Flemington Road Cemetery, 1999

- Location within Queensland Location within Australia
- 20.0058°S 148.2123°E
- Location: Flemington Road, Bowen, Queensland, Australia

History
- Design period: 1870s–1890s (late 19th century)
- Built: 1878–1954

Queensland Heritage Register
- Official name: Flemington Road Cemetery, Bowen Cemetery
- Type: state heritage (landscape, built)
- Designated: 23 July 1999
- Reference no.: 601487
- Significant period: 1878– (social); 1878–1954 (historical, fabric)
- Significant components: headstone, grave surrounds/railings, trees/plantings, cemetery, burial/grave

Flemington Road Cemetery is a heritage-listed cemetery at Flemington Road, Bowen, Whitsunday Region, Queensland, Australia. It was built from 1878 to 1954. It is also known as Bowen Cemetery. It was added to the Queensland Heritage Register on 23 July 1999.

== History ==
The Flemington Road Cemetery is Bowen's second cemetery and operated for 76 years between 1878 and 1954.

During the second half of the nineteenth century the expansion of settlement in North Queensland caused increasing problems with the carriage of freight to and from southern supply centres. In response to this problem, in 1859 the New South Wales Government offered a reward for the discovery of a suitable harbour north of Port Curtis (Gladstone) that could be more easily accessed by northern settlers. This mission was undertaken by Captain Henry Daniel Sinclair, owner of the Santa Barbara, who in August 1859 departed Sydney in order to locate such a suitable harbour. On 15 October 1859 Sinclair's party found such a site, and subsequently named it Port Denison after New South Wales Governor William Denison. The settlement was officially proclaimed on 11 April 1861, and named Bowen after the Queensland Governor, Sir George Ferguson Bowen. Bowen quickly grew to monopolise the northern station trade as a strategically placed supply centre and remains a centre for northern agricultural production.

As with other towns in Queensland, a cemetery reserve was created when the town was surveyed. Much confusion currently exists concerning the history of Bowen's cemeteries due to the limited nature of relevant historic literature. The town's present cemetery is located on John Street, and although often referred to as the new cemetery, this is actually the site of Bowen's first cemetery. As such, this is the site alluded to when historic literature discusses the first, or the old cemetery, despite local opinion to the contrary. The second cemetery, located off Flemington Road, was used alternatively with that on John Street between 1878 and 1954. This was Bowen's second cemetery, or what should be correctly referred to as the new cemetery. The fact that all burials returned to the John Street Cemetery after this period, and the condition of the Flemington Road Cemetery, has led to the misconception that the Flemington Road Cemetery is the older cemetery.

Early evidence in the form of newspaper articles from the Port Denison Times indicate that the first cemetery on John Street had a history of neglect that was much lamented by the locals of the time. In response to this problem, a board of Trustees was appointed, and on 13 July 1867 the Port Denison Times printed rules and regulations of the cemetery in the hope of improving its condition. By 22 February 1868, these rules had been found ineffective in improving the condition of the site. Shortly after this period, public and governmental dissatisfaction arose not only in response to the poor state of the existing graves, but also for the cemetery's inappropriate location for future burials. It had been found that graves were filling with water at a shallow depth, and grave diggers were finding it increasingly difficult to keep coffins out of the water.

First mention of the need to provide a new cemetery is found in the Port Denison Times of 18 March 1871. This paper reports the government willing to grant a new site for the cemetery, given the old site was generally recognised to be as unfit for the purpose. Several locations were considered, including Stone Island, that while publicly considered ideal, would entail the inconvenience of transporting the deceased by boat rather than the traditional horse and carriage. It was decided that a block of 80 to 90 acres (32 to 36 ha), on the banks of the Don River, lying between the pumps and the racecourse, would be most suitable. The site and dimensions of the reserve for the second cemetery, on Portion Numbers 95 and 96, were published in the Queensland Government Gazette on 21 December 1878.

Current evidence suggests this is the site of the Flemington Road Cemetery, identified in early maps of the area as Portion Numbers 95 and 96. Initial application by the Trustees proposed that a new site should be used alternatively with the old, depending on the preference of the deceased's family or representatives. The first registered burial in the new cemetery was of Henrietta Mary, aged 15 weeks; burial number 369 on 10 May 1879. No observable physical remains of this gravesite exist. Five other registered burials are recorded for 1879.

Throughout the early life of the cemetery, funding problems are evident in several petitions made to the public and government in order to facilitate the upkeep of the cemetery. Most often these took the form of projects aimed at fencing the area against livestock that were in the habit of knocking over and trampling headstones. Unfortunately, as both cemeteries were used during the life of the Flemington Road Cemetery, and given the lack of differentiation between cemeteries in Bowen's historic literature, it is difficult to match surviving information with a particular cemetery. Information that can be identified specifically to the Flemington Road Cemetery indicates that the legacy of disrepair to the old cemetery was passed to the new, as the Port Denison Times of 1881 contains several articles of public complaint concerning the physical condition of the new cemetery.

The cemetery contains five Commonwealth war graves of Australian forces personnel, two from World War I and three from World War II.

In November 1944, control of the cemetery passed from the board of trustees to the Bowen Town Council.

In 1949, William Hunter Lewis Nicol, who lived on the reserve and had cleared approximately fifteen acres for farming, applied to acquire the reserve. In response to the application by Nicol, whose father had allegedly leased the land since 1917, it was suggested by the land commissioner that 31 acres (13 ha) 2 roods 32 perches (2,800 m^{2}) be excised from the reserve and offered to Nicol as a priority Special Lease. An area of two acres was to be retained for cemetery purposes, and additional land for a right of way to the cemetery through part of the Special Lease.

In 1952 an area of approximately two acres was surveyed around the existing graves and classed as Portion Number 95, Reserve 54, with the remainder of the original reserve becoming Portion Number 96.

More recent inclusions to the site's history occurred in 1993, when public concern was raised regarding the issue of encroachment on to the reserve by the bordering landowners. This issue seems as yet unresolved.

The issue of neglect of Bowen's cemeteries has persisted into the recent history of the site. In March 1993 the Bowen Shire Council publicly noted that while the Flemington Road Cemetery contained a number of headstones, it was poorly maintained due to the expense and isolation of the cemetery. Furthermore, the council suggested relocating the headstones in the Flemington Road Cemetery to the John Street Cemetery in order to facilitate mechanical clearance at the site. Descendants and relatives of those buried in the Flemington Road Cemetery met this notice with severe disapproval, and no council action would appear to have been taken. Other developments from this period include a proposition to erect an interpretive sign at the site.

== Description ==
Officially, the Flemington Road Cemetery is located on a roughly rectangular block of level alluvial river flat, encompassing 8094 square-meters, defined as Portion number 95, Reserve 54. The reserve is located completely within, and can only be accessed by dirt road through Portion Number 96, currently used for agricultural purposes. On site the dimensions of the cemetery are unmarked.

The entire area is covered in several species of grass, and thinly scattered throughout the area are well established eucalypts, wattles, and Burdekin plum trees.

The cemetery is currently unfenced, although physical evidence on site suggests that several fencing efforts have been previously undertaken to protect particular family plots. The practice of inscribing the names of several deceased family members on a single headstone has resulted in the twenty-two observable headstones actually representing 39 burials. The inscriptions on all but one of the headstones are observable. The twenty-two observable gravesites are spread over a wide area, suggesting the presence of unobservable graves, further evidenced by the lack of observable gravesites of deceased known to be located there. The oldest inscription, referring to the death of Jessie B. Scott on 10 May 1863, presents something of a mystery, considering the site began operating as a cemetery only after 1878. It seems likely that the deceased lies elsewhere, with the name being inscribed on the headstone at a later date out of respect. The most recent observable headstone inscription refers to the death of one Catherine Mary Brecht in 1947.

Given the small number of observable graves, a broad range of grave styles is represented. Headstones are predominantly of limestone, with sandstone and concrete also present. Many of the headstones do not record the stonemason responsible for their manufacture, those that do, include the names of Melrose and Fenwick, A.L. Petrie, and W. Batson & Sons S.B. Several cast-iron fence designs are also present.

The cemetery is in very poor condition. All headstones are damaged to varying extents. Of the sites that have gravestones, few are intact. Fencing lies in disarray among the graves. All but a few of the originally fenced graves have had fencing removed. All fences are damaged. Several of the graves are heavily overgrown. Evidence of previous attempts to maintain the physical condition of the cemetery can be seen in the form of scrubbed headstones, poisoned grave perimeters and damage to grave perimeters from the employment of mechanical equipment such as whipper-snippers.

== Heritage listing ==
Flemington Road Cemetery was listed on the Queensland Heritage Register on 23 July 1999 having satisfied the following criteria.

The place is important in demonstrating the evolution or pattern of Queensland's history.

The settlement of Port Denison (Bowen) being the first town in North Queensland, is of special significance as it represents the earliest period of the settlement of the Kennedy Region. As such, the Flemington Road Cemetery is important in demonstrating the evolution and pattern of Queensland's history in being tangible evidence of the settlement.

The place is important in demonstrating the principal characteristics of a particular class of cultural places.

The cemetery is also important as it provides evidence of the history and demography of the Bowen area, and demonstrates architectural trends in monument design during the latter half of the nineteenth and earlier twentieth century.

The place has a strong or special association with a particular community or cultural group for social, cultural or spiritual reasons.

Existing headstones on site clearly indicate the family names of many notable figures from Bowen's early history, such as Betzel, Darwen, Sinclair, Bull, Jensen and Brecht. Being the resting-place of the physical remains of early settlers and relations to current Bowen residents, the Flemington Road Cemetery has both a strong and special association with the Bowen community for social, cultural and spiritual reasons.
