= Bowen Courthouse =

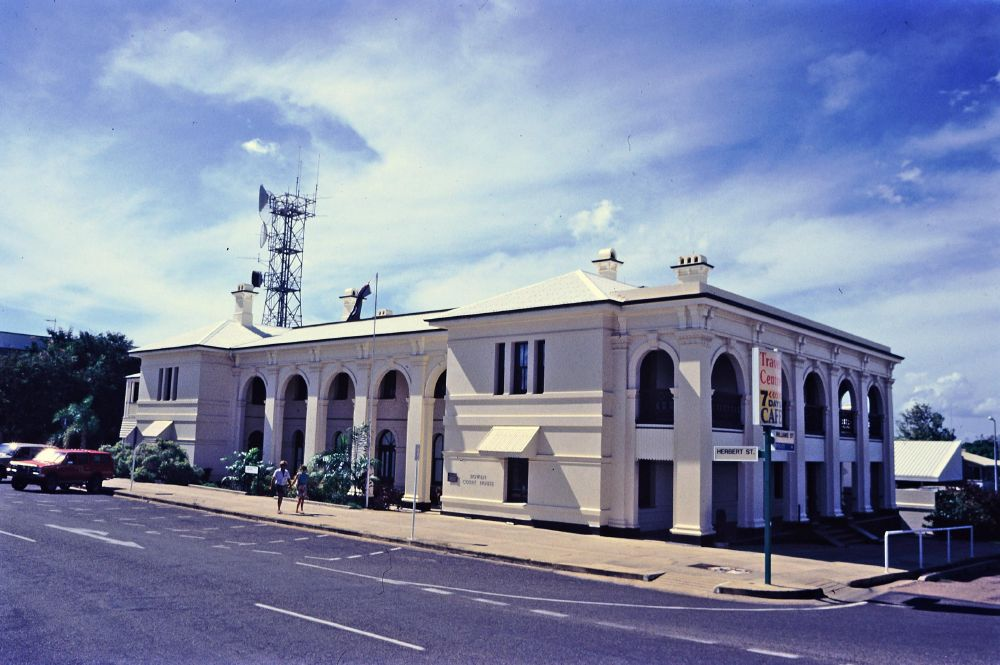
- Bowen Courthouse, 1995

- Location within Queensland
- 20.0127°S 148.2471°E
- Location: 30 Williams Street, Bowen, Whitsunday Region, Queensland, Australia

History
- Design period: 1870s–1890s (late 19th century)
- Built: 1880

Site notes
- Architect: George St Paul Connolly of the Colonial Architect's Office
- Architectural style: Classicism

Queensland Heritage Register
- Official name: Bowen Court House
- Type: state heritage (built)
- Designated: 21 October 1992
- Reference no.: 600044
- Significant period: 1880s (historical); 1880–1920s (fabric)
- Significant components: court house, verandahs – arcaded
- Builders: Southall & Tracey

Bowen Courthouse is a heritage-listed courthouse at 30 Williams Street (corner with Herbert Street), Bowen, Whitsunday Region, Queensland, Australia. It was designed by George St Paul Connolly of the Colonial Architect's Office and built in 1880 by Southall & Tracey. It is also known as Bowen Court House. It was added to the Queensland Heritage Register on 21 October 1992.

The courthouse was completed in 1881 in the Classical Revival style. It is a two-storey building and was constructed in rendered brick with a corrugated iron roof.

It is still in use today and contains most of the original furniture and features.

== History ==
The Bowen Court House is a substantial masonry building in Classical Revival style, prominently located on the corner of Herbert and Williams Streets, Bowen. It was built in 1880 to house the Northern Supreme Court, the Bowen Post Office and Government Offices. Since 1899 it has functioned as a District and Magistrates court.

In 1859 prior to the separation of Queensland, the Government of New South Wales commissioned Captain H.D. Sinclair to find a suitable site for a port to support the pastoral development of the Kennedy district. He selected a place on Port Denison, an inlet of the Coral Sea, although Queensland became a separate colony before settlement took place there. The new township, designated a Port of Entry, was formally established on 12 April 1861 and named after Sir George Ferguson Bowen, first Governor of Queensland. The first pastoral run in the area, Strathmore, was taken up in the same year by the Cunningham family who were quickly followed by other graziers eager to establish grazing properties. A Police Magistrate was appointed to serve Bowen in late 1860 and a temporary courthouse was constructed. Bowen soon became a major administrative and commercial centre and was declared a municipality (the Borough of Bowen) on 17 March 1863 in the courthouse. This was merely a small slab hut without a verandah and which was not weather proof. After local agitation, tenders for a Court House were called in October 1864, though a building was not constructed. Two other northern ports were established in 1864, at Cardwell and Townsville.

In Nov 1865, Bowen became a District Court area. Judge Joseph Innes, later to become Attorney General and Judge of the Supreme Court of New South Wales, was appointed as Bowen's first District Court Judge. He arrived in early 1866 and held court in the Municipal Chambers. Because of the financial crisis taking place in Queensland in 1866, the planned courthouse did not go forward and in early 1867, the judge made unauthorised changes to the court house to improve conditions.

In 1874, recognising the rapid development of North Queensland, due largely to the discovery of gold, the Supreme Court Act increased the number of judges in Queensland to 4, of which 1 was to reside in Bowen as "the Northern Judge". The Bowen Supreme Court formally opened before His Honour Mr Justice Edmund Sheppard on 21 Oct 1874. The Supreme Court first sat in Townsville on 12 Feb 1875, Bowen 26 Feb 1875, and Cooktown 29 May 1876.

Queensland developed as a series of ports linked to inland resources. Bowen was disadvantaged, despite its excellent harbour, because it was located on a flood plain and the Burdekin River flooded regularly, cutting off the port from the hinterland for extended periods. Bowen's importance decreased in the 1870s following the success of Townsville, which had better access routes to pastoral mining and centres, particularly the major goldfields at Charters Towers and the Palmer River.

By May 1877, all the government buildings in Bowen had become dilapidated and it was recommended that it would be more economic in the long term, allowing for the tropical climate, to construct new buildings in masonry. The site selected for the new court was considered the best in town and plans were completed by July 1879. Presumably for reasons of economy, the new building was to house several different functions in different parts of the building. A large court room occupied the centre of the building, rising to its full height The south wing was occupied by the Post Master, the ground floor containing the office, kitchen and servant's room, and the upper floor sitting and bedrooms. The lower floor of the north wing was designed to house officials of the Supreme Court, and the upper floor was shared by the Survey and Roads offices, with bedrooms for Court Officials.

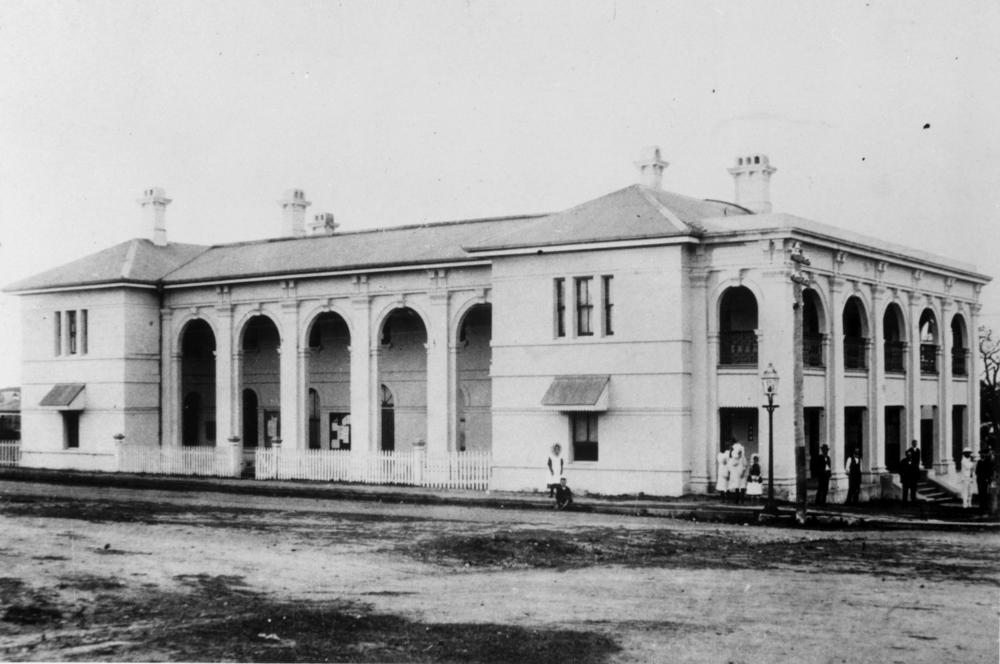
Bowen Courthouse, 1894

The building was designed in the Colonial Architect's office during the time when FDG Stanley was the Colonial Architect. Within the office, the design of the building is attributed to GS Connolly, who later became Colonial Architect himself. Both architects excelled in the classical revival style chosen, which was thought well suited to public buildings intended to convey a sense of stability and dignity, particularly a court which represented the power of the law. The building is on a corner site and designed so that the major street elevations each represented a separate function housed within the building; that to Herbert Street representing the Court and that to Williams Street the Post Office. The two elevations are linked stylistically by the use of arcades.

The tender of builders Southall and Tracey for £8023 was accepted and work was completed by July 1881. The old court buildings were sold in 1884. Soon after this, however, the pre-eminence of Townsville as the major town in North Queensland was recognised in the 1889 the Supreme Court Bill which provided for the appointment of a second northern judge and the relocation of the Northern Supreme Court to Townsville. This occurred on 1 December 1899, although Townsville did not have a purpose-designed court house. Since this time the Bowen Court House has functioned as a District and Magistrate's Court.

The building remained substantially unchanged for many years, apart from some minor additions and alterations. A verandah was added to the north-west elevation in 1913, and the balustrades and posts have been altered.

It underwent a $4 million refurbishment in November 2004. The work included the installation of an additional courtroom, closed-circuit television, a lift and videoconferencing technology. The refurbishments were completed in late 2006.

== Description ==
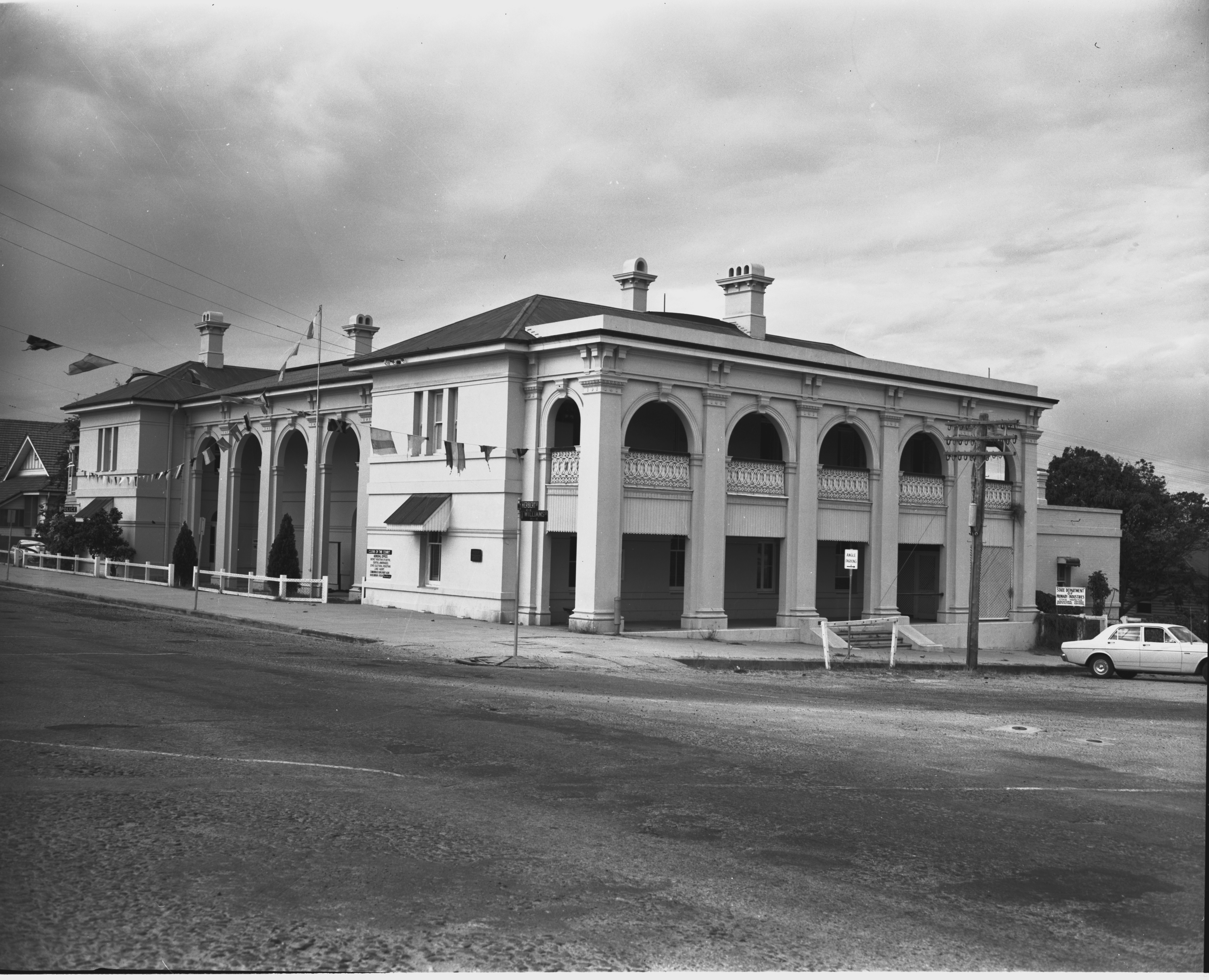
Courthouse and Government Offices, Bowen, circa 1967

The Bowen Court House is a two-storey classical revival building constructed of rendered brick, with a corrugated galvanised iron roof. It is located on the corner of Williams and Herbert Street, the main street of Bowen, and addresses both streets with major facades.

The building is "H" shaped in plan, with a small single story projection to the east corner which was originally a kitchen and bedroom. The wings are now occupied by offices and the court room is in the centre section, rising through both stories with a mezzanine level public gallery at the south east end.

The walls of the court room are rendered and scored up to a moulded plaster dado, and have painted brickwork above. The ceiling is lined with beaded tongue and groove boards divided by exposed stop-chamfered beams, with turned knobs at the intersections. The space has 4 pane, horizontally pivoting windows to the upper section and large double hung windows with arched heads in the lower section. Centred on each long side of the court are pairs of four-panel entry doors. The furniture of the court room includes the bench, jury benches, press box and dock all constructed from beaded tongue and groove boarding, and a silky oak witness stand.

The upper level offices have ripple iron ceilings, moulded timber architraves and chimney pieces. The internal doors are four-panelled with toplights and glazed french doors with toplights open onto the verandahs. There is a timber staircase with turned balusters in the north-west block, and a similar new stair in the south-east block. Ceilings in the lower level are fibrous plaster or masonite with cover strips.

The south-east verandah has masonry arches, infilled with cast iron panels, and a timber floor. The north-west verandah is timber, with a timber balustrade and lattice, and weatherboard toilet rooms at the northern corner.

== Heritage listing ==
Bowen Court House has been listed by the National Trust of Queensland and the Australian Heritage Commission. Bowen Court House was listed on the Queensland Heritage Register on 21 October 1992 having satisfied the following criteria.

The place is important in demonstrating the evolution or pattern of Queensland's history.

The Bowen Court House is important in demonstrating the early prominence of Bowen, being considerably more grand than other early courts at Townsville and Charters Towers; both of which towns were to eclipse Bowen. As the first Supreme Court outside Brisbane, it also illustrates the way in which a legal system was established and government services provided in the developing north of the colony. The inclusion of a second function as a Post Office indicates both the need for economy and the importance given to the role of communications services.

The place demonstrates rare, uncommon or endangered aspects of Queensland's cultural heritage.

The court house remains substantially unchanged since completion and retains the major components of its original furniture, which is now rare.

The place is important in demonstrating the principal characteristics of a particular class of cultural places.

The building is a good example of a government building of its era with offices and accommodation provided for judges and court officers and for other government officials.

The place is important because of its aesthetic significance.

Bowen Court House is an important component of the streetscape of Bowen. It is a well designed and prominent public building and an excellent example of the high quality work produced by the Colonial Architects office.

The place has a special association with the life or work of a particular person, group or organisation of importance in Queensland's history.

It is associated with the life and work of GS Connolly (1847–1901) and FDG Stanley (1839–1897) of the Colonial Architects office who made a great contribution to the building of Queensland.
