= Bowen, Queensland =

Bowen
- Town
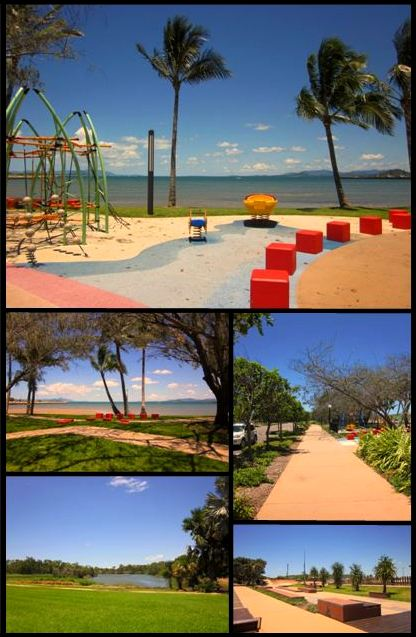
- Top: Playground at Bowen Foreshore, Middle left: Bowen Foreshore, Middle right: Walkway along Santa Barbara parade, Bottom left: Muller's Lagoon, Bottom right: Bowen Skatebowl

- Interactive map of Bowen
- Coordinates: 20.0102°S 148.2416°E
- Country: Australia
- State: Queensland
- LGA: Whitsunday Region
- Location: 67.6 km (42.0 mi) NW of Proserpine; 201 km (125 mi) SE of Townsville; 1,165 km (724 mi) NNW of Brisbane

Government
  - State electorate: Burdekin
  - Federal division: Dawson

Area
  - Total: 1,651.8 km^{2} (637.8 sq mi)

Population
  - Total: 11,205 (2021 census)
  - Density: 6.7835/km^{2} (17.5692/sq mi)
- Time zone: UTC+10:00 (AEST)
- Postcode: 4805
- Mean max temp: 28.5 °C (83.3 °F)
- Mean min temp: 19.8 °C (67.6 °F)
- Annual rainfall: 1,009.6 mm (39.75 in)
Localities around Bowen
Guthalungra	Coral Sea	Coral Sea
Bogie	Bowen	Gregory River
Bogie	Lake Proserpine	Mount Pluto

Bowen is a coastal town and locality in the Whitsunday Region, Queensland, Australia. In the 2021 census, the locality of Bowen had a population of 11,205 people.

The locality contains two other towns:

- Heronvale (20.107°S 148.2933°E)
- Merinda (20.0164°S 148.1647°E).

The Abbot Point coal shipping port is also within the locality (19.8816°S 148.0795°E).

== Geography ==
Bowen is located on the north-east coast in North Queensland, at exactly twenty degrees south of the equator. Bowen is halfway between Townsville and Mackay, and 1,130 kilometres (700 mi) by road from Brisbane.

Bowen sits on a square peninsula, with the Coral Sea to the north, east, and south. To the south-east is Port Denison and Edgecumbe Bay. On the western side, where the peninsula connects with the mainland, the Don River's alluvial plain provides fertile soil that supports a prosperous farming industry.

Merinda is a hinterland town 10.3 kilometres (6.4 mi) west of the town of Bowen.

The Bruce Highway enters the locality from the east, approaches but does not enter the town of Bowen itself, but then turns west to pass through Merinda before exiting the locality to the north-west. The North Coast railway line follows a similar route, approaching the district from the south and served by the Bowen railway station located to the west of the town. After exiting the station, the line turns northwest over the Don river to its next major stop at Home Hill. At Merinda railway station, there is the junction with the Collinsville-Newlands railway line servicing the Bowen basin Coalfields. The Collinsville-Newlands line extends to the coal-handling port at Abbot Point, also within the locality of Bowen. The railway station servicing the port is the Abbot Point railway station.

Heronvale is a small coastal town 21.6 kilometres (13.4 mi) by road south of the town of Bowen, accessed via the Bruce Highway and then Heronvale Road.

In the west of the locality is the Mount Aberdeen National Park.

Two of Bowen's main streets are named after officers of the British colonial paramilitary Native Police force. Powell Street is named after Lieutenant Walter David Taylor Powell and Williams Street is named after Lieutenant Ewan G. Williams.

== History ==
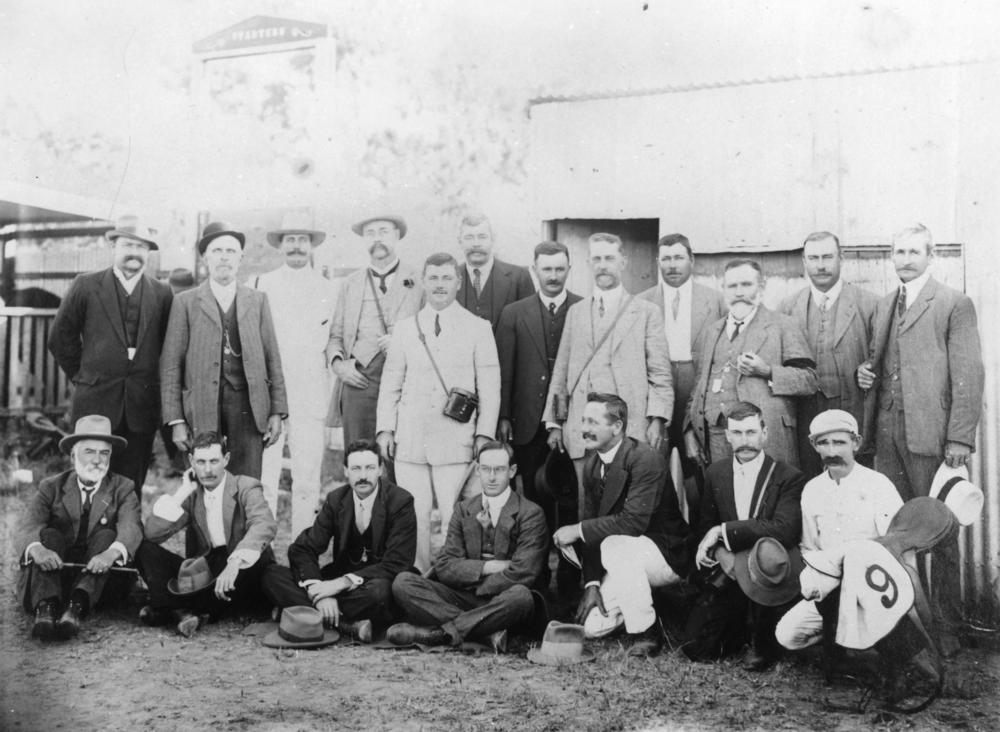
Bowen Turf Club, ca. 1910

Biri (also known as Birri) is a language of Central and North Queensland. Biri refers to a language chain extending from Central Queensland towards Townsville and is often used as a universal name for other languages and/or dialects across the region. The language area includes the towns of Bowen, Ayr, Collinsville and Nebo.

Yuru (also known as Juru, Euronbba, Juru, Mal Mal, Malmal) is an Australian Aboriginal language spoken on Yuru country. The Yuru language region includes the landscape within the local government boundaries of the Shire of Burdekin, including the town of Home Hill.

Captain James Cook named Cape Gloucester on his voyage of exploration up the Australian coast in 1770. This "cape" turned out to be an island, and Gloucester Island dominates the view from Bowen's eastern beaches. Behind the island is a bay that forms an excellent port, which the town came to be built around.

Shipwreck survivor, James Morrill, resided briefly in the area around the year 1850 with the local Aboriginal clan during his seventeen years living as a castaway.

In 1859 Captain Henry Daniel Sinclair led an expedition to the area in response to a reward offered by the colony of New South Wales for finding a port somewhere north of Rockhampton. They came across a "most splendid harbour" which Sinclair named Port Denison after the colonial governor of New South Wales, William Denison. On the shore they found "several acres of ground resembling a garden...full of a vegetable resembling nuts" which the local Aboriginal people had constructed.

On 11 September 1860, George Elphinstone Dalrymple on his naval excursion in the schooner Spitfire to search for the mouth of the Burdekin River, landed in Port Denison. He named and climbed Mount Gordon to survey the region and observed that a river (later named the Don River) traversed a valley just behind Port Denison and into the sea. This river was "lined with camps and bush fires of the natives" indicating "the locality to be very thickly inhabited". The Spitfire continued its exploration north to Magnetic Island, but the surveyors came to the conclusion that the northeastern shore of Port Denison was the most suitable site in the region for settlement especially as the large native wells present in a creek bed there could be utilised as a water supply. On 5 October, Dalrymple again came ashore to appropriate control of these wells. He wrote that:

"As I approached the beach a number of armed natives appeared to wish to dispute our landing, but as the object in view was a necessity, I..formed open line and advanced. The natives..retired at our approach into a small strip of scrub commanding the wells. This we entered in the same order, cleared it and placed sentries.."

Confident in having secured a beach-head, Dalrymple explored the immediate vicinity near the wells that was to become the town of Bowen. He found a large Aboriginal tomb in the hills behind the beach that was in the form of a raised mound covered in bark with its surroundings swept clean and the paths leading to it closed off with branches. A similar tomb was found on nearby Stone Island. After a few days, Dalrymple and his surveying party on the Spitfire returned south.

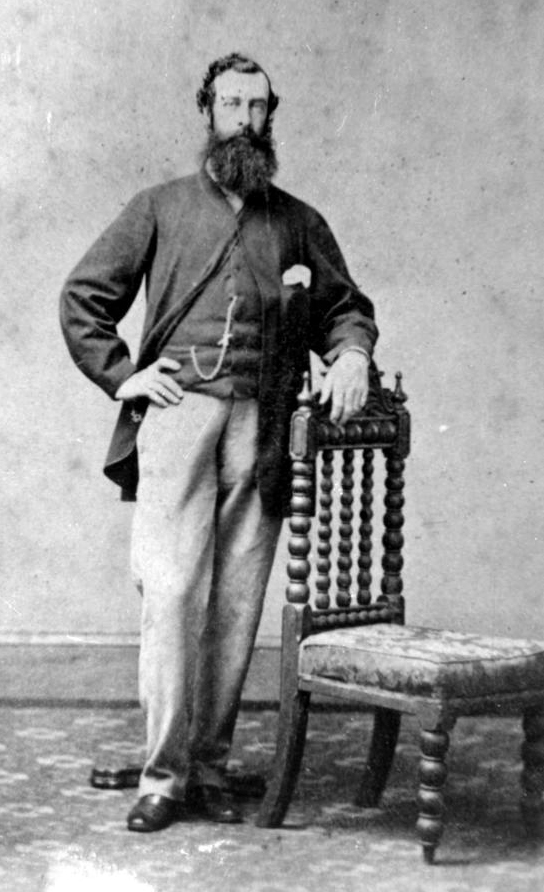
George Elphinstone Dalrymple

In 1861, George Elphinstone Dalrymple set out again for the area, leading an overland expedition from Rockhampton, complemented with a naval contingent to rendezvous at Port Denison and establish a permanent settlement. Dalrymple planned this two pronged entry into the area because 'a sudden cooperation of land and sea forces..would either strike terror, which would result in immediate flight, or enable a blow to be struck' against the local Aboriginal people of which many had been seen camped around the harbour. To facilitate this plan, Dalrymple travelled with Lieutenant Williams and six Native Police troopers, while Lieutenant Walter Powell and his troopers travelled on the ships. These ships were the Jeannie Dove and the Santa Barbara under the command of Capt. McDermott.

The maritime group arrived first and waited for Dalrymple's overland party by camping on Stone Island at the mouth of the harbour. Dalrymple's group, which included 140 horses and 121 cattle, arrived on 11 April 1861. He rode down to the area on the foreshore 'beside the native wells' (which was to be the water supply of the settlement) in order 'to clear off the aborigines from the same, should such be necessary' and to signal McDermott's group on Stone Island. The local Aboriginal people had already fled. The settlers on Stone Island then came over to the site and the town of Port Denison was founded. Dalrymple wrote that it was 'Deeply gratifying to me to see the British flag flying over the spot where..a few days ago, the wild aboriginal held undisputed sway', and that the settlement marked 'the advance of another great wave of Anglo-Australian energy'.

Within the first six weeks of colonisation, the Native Police and armed colonists conducted at least six operations against the Aboriginal people in the area, driving them off the land and also pursuing them by sea. In one of these missions, the whole available force in the town was utilised in an engagement where a large group of Aboriginal people were "speedily put to rout with a loss sufficient to teach them a severe and it is hoped, useful lesson." Newspapers published reports that the local Aboriginal population were "wretched caricatures of the human race...faithless stewards of the fine property on which they horde", and that it was "the duty of civilisation to occupy the soil which they disregard and disgrace", and that "force and even severity may be necessary to restrain their brutal disposition". Pastoralists were quick to enter the region through this new port and mark out land acquisitions in the hinterland, while buildings within the township were rapidly constructed.

After Queensland had separated from New South Wales, the town was renamed Bowen after the first Queensland colonial governor, Sir George Bowen. Port Denison Post Office opened in April 1861 and was renamed Bowen by 1865.

Between the 1860s and the 1880s, early colonists and settlers forecasted Bowen as the "capital of a new North Queensland Colony". Relics of this particular ambition can be seen today in Bowen's exacting road grid and town plan, and the avenue-like width of its central streets.

In 1863, settlers in the area encountered a sailor, James Morrill, who had been shipwrecked 17 years previously on a shoal in the Coral Sea. He had made it to the Queensland coast on a makeshift raft with a few companions. The others had all died within two years, but Morrill lived with the local Aborigines in the Townsville area. Rejoining European society after white settlement began in North Queensland, he settled in Bowen. His grave is in the Bowen cemetery.

Bowen State School opened in 1865. Between 1877 and 1922, it operated as two schools: Bowen Boys State School and Bowen Girls and Infants State School. A secondary department was added to Bowen State School in 1928. On 23 January 1961, the secondary department was replaced by Bowen State High School.

St Mary's School was opened on 1 September 1872 by Sister M. Gertrude and Sister M. de Sales, both members of the Sisters of St Joseph of the Sacred Heart founded by Mother Mary MacKillop. Following to ongoing conflict between MacKillop and James Quinn, the Roman Catholic Archbishop of Brisbane, over who controlled the schools operated by the Sisters in Queensland, Quinn expelled the sisters from his diocese in 1880 and they returned to South Australia where the order was first established. Quinn established a group of Diocesan Sisters using the name Sisters of the Holy Family who operated the school under Quinn's direct authority until 1885, when the Sisters of Mercy took over the running of the school withSister Mary Modwena Taylor, Sister M. Stanislaus Kostka Harding and Sister M. Winifred Duggan being transferred from The Range Convent School in Rockhampton.

The coral reefs around Bowen are the scene of several shipwrecks, including the SS Gothenburg, which sank in 1875 with a loss of more than 100 lives. Numerous relics of Bowen's history, from the Aboriginal past onwards, are on display at the Bowen Historical Society's museum.

On 22 February 1876, an F5 tornado hit the town, causing large amounts of damage.

The location of the Merinda railway station was influenced by the location of the Merinda meatworks (Bowen) for transportation of workers and distribution of meat products.

In 1894, the Bowen Meatworks operation was started but was often the subject of industrial disputes, changes in management and closures. In 1922, the Meatworks was able to process 150 bullocks per day It was a major source of industry and employment until 1997.

Warden Bend Provisional School opened circa 1891. On 1 January 1909 it became Warden Bend State School. It closed in 1912.

Merinda Provisional School opened in 1898 and became Merinda State School on 1 January 1909.

On Sunday 30 April 1911, the foundation stone was laid for St Mary's Catholic Church. On Sunday 2 December 1912, the church was officially opened by James Murray, the Vicar Apostolic of Cooktown.

On 24 February 2006, Bishop Michael Putney dedicated the current St Mary's in Sinclair Street.

Roseville State School opened on 7 July 1913. It was along the Bowen-to-Proserpine tramway. The school closed in 1939.

Don Delta State School opened on 21 July 1913 and closed in 1964.

Eden Lassie Provisional School opened on 16 October 1916. In 1924 it became Eden Lassie State School. It closed in 1951, but later reopened and closed permanently in 1963. Opened as a provisional school in 1916 and was proclaimed a state school in 1924. It closed in 1951 and reopened before finally closing in 1963.

Twenty-five Mile Camp Provisional School opened circa 1919. It may have been renamed Aberdeen Provisional School. In 1920 it was renamed Bogie Range Provisional School. It closed circa 1922.

Ballast Pit Provisional School opened on 11 April 1922. On 26 July 1923 it was renamed Bin Bee Provisional School. It closed in July 1927. It was on the Bowen Coalfields railway line.

Inverdon Road State School opened on 4 December 1922 and closed on 2 September 1955. It was at 174 Inverdon Road (19.9896°S 148.2119°E).

Queens Beach State School opened on 25 November 1940.

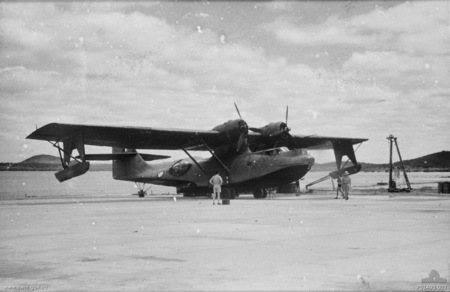
Catalina flying boats from No. 11 Squadron RAAF

Elements of the Royal Australian Air Force (RAAF) have been operating from Bowen for almost two decades, beginning in the late 1920s. Three RAAF flying boat squadrons and one flying boat maintenance unit operated from the shores of Port Denison during World War 2 operating PBY Catalina and Martin Mariner amphibious seaplanes. No.55 (RAAF) Radar Station also operated from Cape Edgecumbe north-east of the town. The concrete seaplane aprons and ramps are still present.

In 1944, Bowen elected a Communist, Fred Paterson, to Queensland Legislative Assembly. He was re-elected in 1947, but lost the seat in 1950 when the boundaries were changed to include Bowen in the seat of Whitsunday.

Bowen State High School opened on 23 January 1961, replacing the secondary department at Bowen State School which had operated since 1 July 1928.

Bowen was the administrative centre for the Shire of Bowen. On 15 March 2008, under the Local Government (Reform Implementation) Act 2007 passed by the Parliament of Queensland on 10 August 2007, the Shire of Bowen merged with the Shire of Whitsunday to form the Whitsunday Region. Although Proserpine is the administrative centre for the new regional council, the council maintains offices in Bowen and holds a number of council meetings in Bowen each year.

Bowen Orbital Spaceport, in nearby Abbott Point, was granted the first licence for an orbital space launch facility in Australia in March 2024, with the first launch attempt of Australian made rocket occurring in July 2025, by Gilmour Space Technologies.

== Demographics ==
In the 2016 census, the locality of Bowen had a population of 10,377 people. Aboriginal and Torres Strait Islander people made up 9.2% of the population. 74.2% of people were born in Australia. The next most common countries of birth were New Zealand 2.4%, England 2.0%, South Korea 1.3%, Philippines 1.1% and Taiwan 1.0%. 81.5% of people only spoke English at home. Other languages spoken at home included Mandarin 1.5% and Korean 1.2%, The most common responses for religion were No Religion 25.8%, Catholic 20.5% and Anglican 17.6%.

In the 2021 census, the locality of Bowen had a population of 11,205 people.

== Heritage listings ==
Bowen has a number of heritage-listed sites, including:

- Flemington Road Cemetery, Flemington Road
- Bowen Harbour Board Building, 6 Herbert Street
- Bowen Post Office, 46 Herbert Street
- Bowen State School, 29 Kennedy Street
- Bowen Courthouse, 30 Williams Street

== Economy ==
The town has a diversified economy primarily based on agriculture, fishing, tourism, and mining. Its dry climate plus its fertile alluvial soil, makes it an ideal place to grow a wide variety of small crops, including tomatoes, rockmelons (i.e., cantaloupes), and capsicums (i.e., bell peppers). Outside the alluvial plain, much of the Bowen area is used for beef cattle.. The Merinda meatworks (Bowen) was a source of employment and economic growth of the town for many years.

Just north of Bowen is the Abbot Point coal loading port. Coal mined inland of Bowen in Collinsville and other towns in the Bowen Basin is brought by rail to a deepwater pier to be loaded on bulk carriers. Coal is exported mainly to China and India.

== Education ==
Bowen State School is a government primary (Early Childhood to Year 6) school for boys and girls at 29 Kennedy Street (20.0101°S 148.2438°E). In 2015, it had an enrolment of 480 students with 34 teachers (30 full-time equivalent). In 2018, the school had an enrolment of 448 students with 31 teachers (30 full-time equivalent) and 22 non-teaching staff (15 full-time equivalent). It includes a special education program.

Queens Beach State School is a government primary (Prep–6) school for boys and girls at 39 Tracey Street (19.9761°S 148.2271°E). In 2014 (when it was a P–7 school), it had an enrolment of 452 students with 32 teachers (30 full-time equivalent). In 2018, the school had an enrolment of 426 students with 35 teachers (31 full-time equivalent) and 22 non-teaching staff (13 full-time equivalent).

Merinda State School is a government primary (Prep–6) school for boys and girls at Bergl Street (20.0201°S 148.1636°E). In 2015, it had an enrolment of 87 students with 7 teachers (5 full-time equivalent). In 2018, the school had an enrolment of 55 students with 4 teachers and 6 non-teaching staff (3 full-time equivalent).

St Mary's Catholic School is a Catholic primary (Prep–6) school for boys and girls at 39 Poole Street (20.0115°S 148.2421°E). In 2015, it had an enrolment of 83 students. In 2018, the school had an enrolment of 71 students with 11 teachers (5 full-time equivalent) and 9 non-teaching staff (5 full-time equivalent).

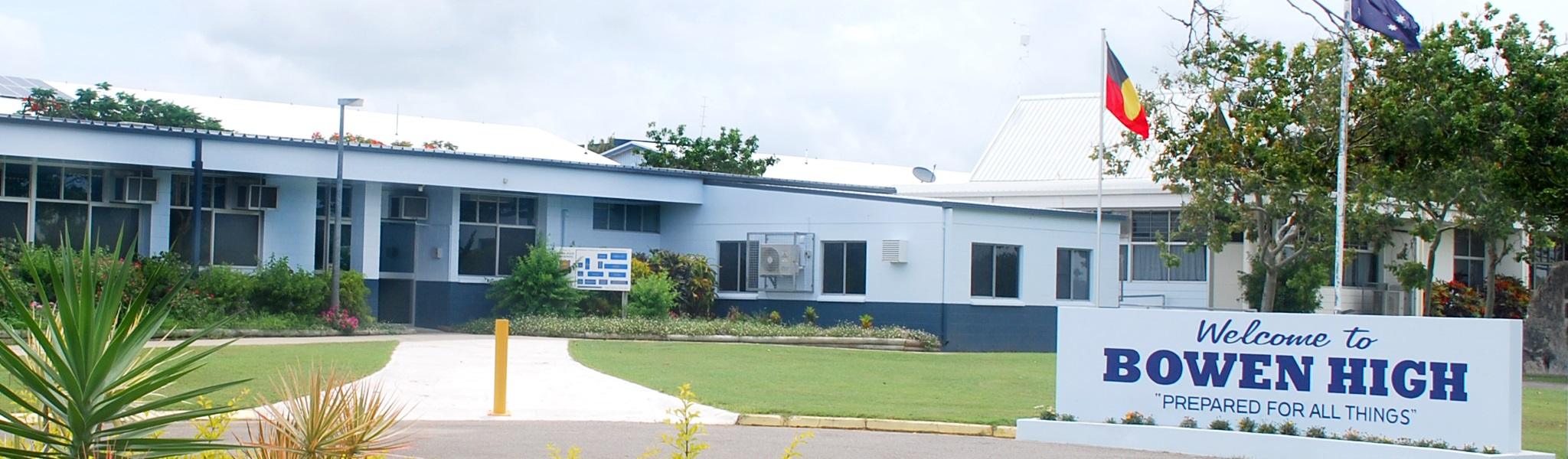
Bowen State High School, 2025

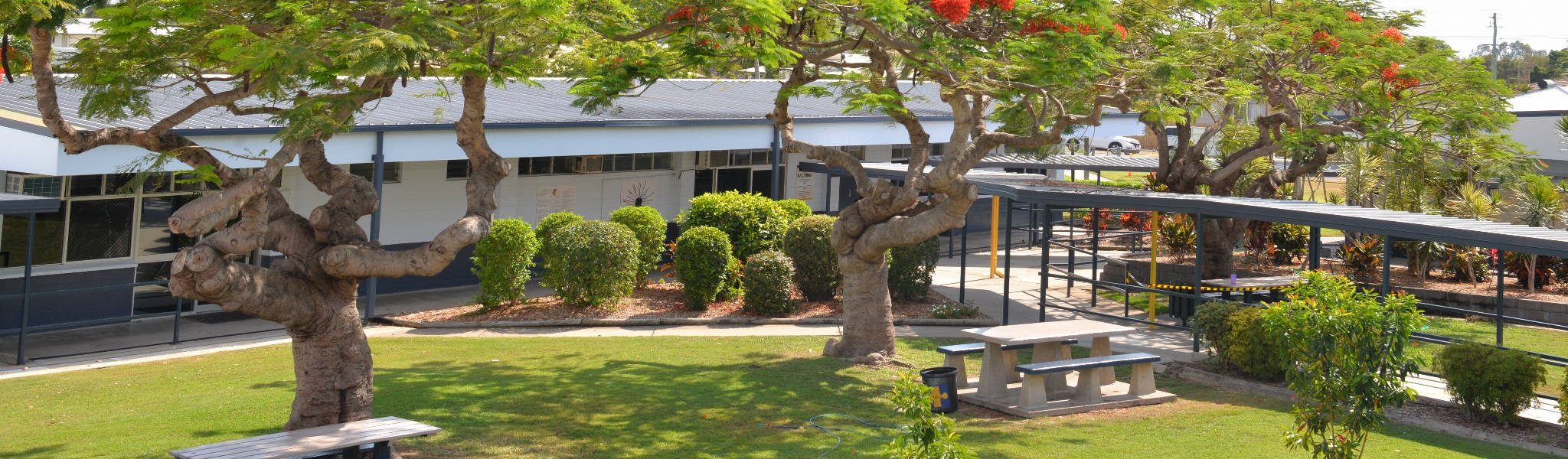
Bowen State High School grounds, 2025

Bowen State High School is a government secondary (7–12) school for boys and girls at 1–9 Argyle Park Road (19.9991°S 148.2355°E). In 2015, it had an enrolment of 657 students with 58 teachers (56 full-time equivalent). In 2018, the school had an enrolment of 622 students with 58 teachers (56 full-time equivalent) and 37 non-teaching staff (28 full-time equivalent). It includes a special education program.

TAFE Queensland North is a government co-educational tertiary institute for vocational skills. Its Bowen campus is at 98–158 Queens Road. Before 2013, the Bowen campus was part of the Barrier Reef Institute of TAFE.

== Amenities ==
Whitsunday Regional Council operates Bowen Public Library at 67 Herbert Street. The library opened in 1965 with refurbishments in 1978 and 2012.

Major airlines service Proserpine (Whitsunday Coast) airport located south of Bowen, this is the nearest major airport to the town.

The Bowen branch of the Queensland Country Women's Association meets at the QCWA Hall at 52 Herbert Street (20.0114°S 148.2463°E).

St Mary's Catholic Church is in Sinclair Street between Poole Street and Gordon Street (20.0125°S 148.2416°E). It is part of the Roman Catholic Diocese of Townsville.

Bowen Uniting Church is at 37 Kennedy Street (20.0105°S 148.2416°E), which was formerly the hall of the St James' Presbyterian Church. It provides services in English, Korean and Tongan languages.

== Attractions ==
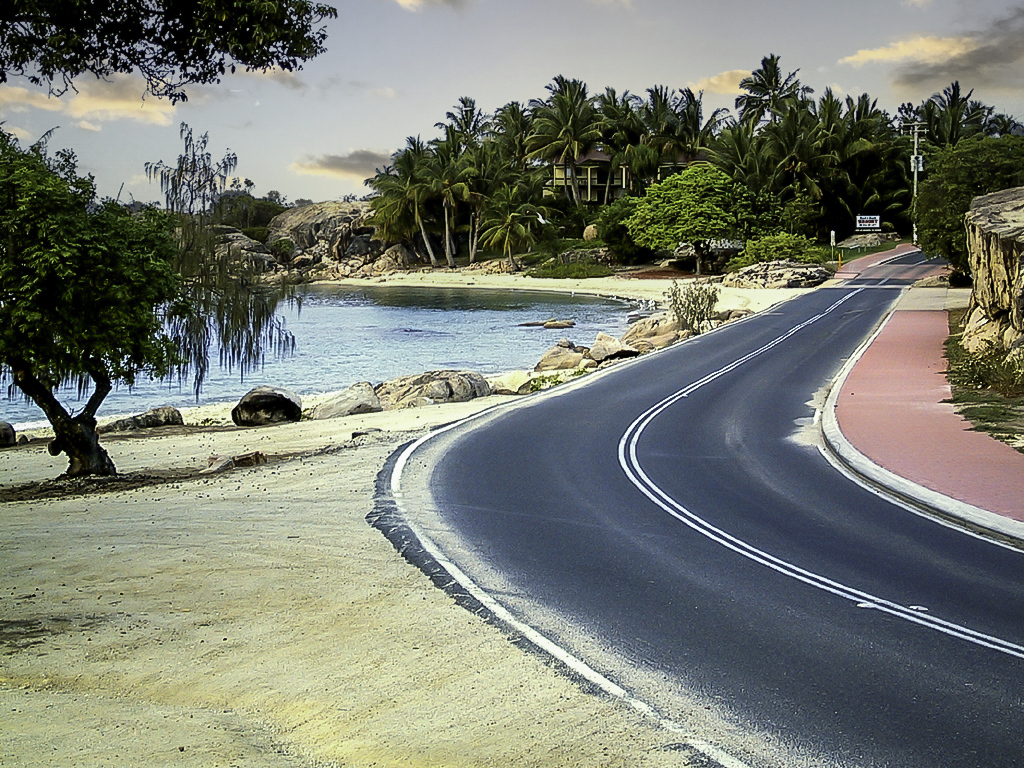
Greys Bay, Bowen, 2020

Bowen is on a peninsula, with ocean on three sides. This gives eight beaches surrounding the town, namely Kings Beach, Queens Beach, Horseshoe Bay, Murrays Bay, Greys Bay, Rose Bay, and the Front Beach. There is also the clothing-optional Coral Bay. Kings Beach offers views of nearby Gloucester Island.

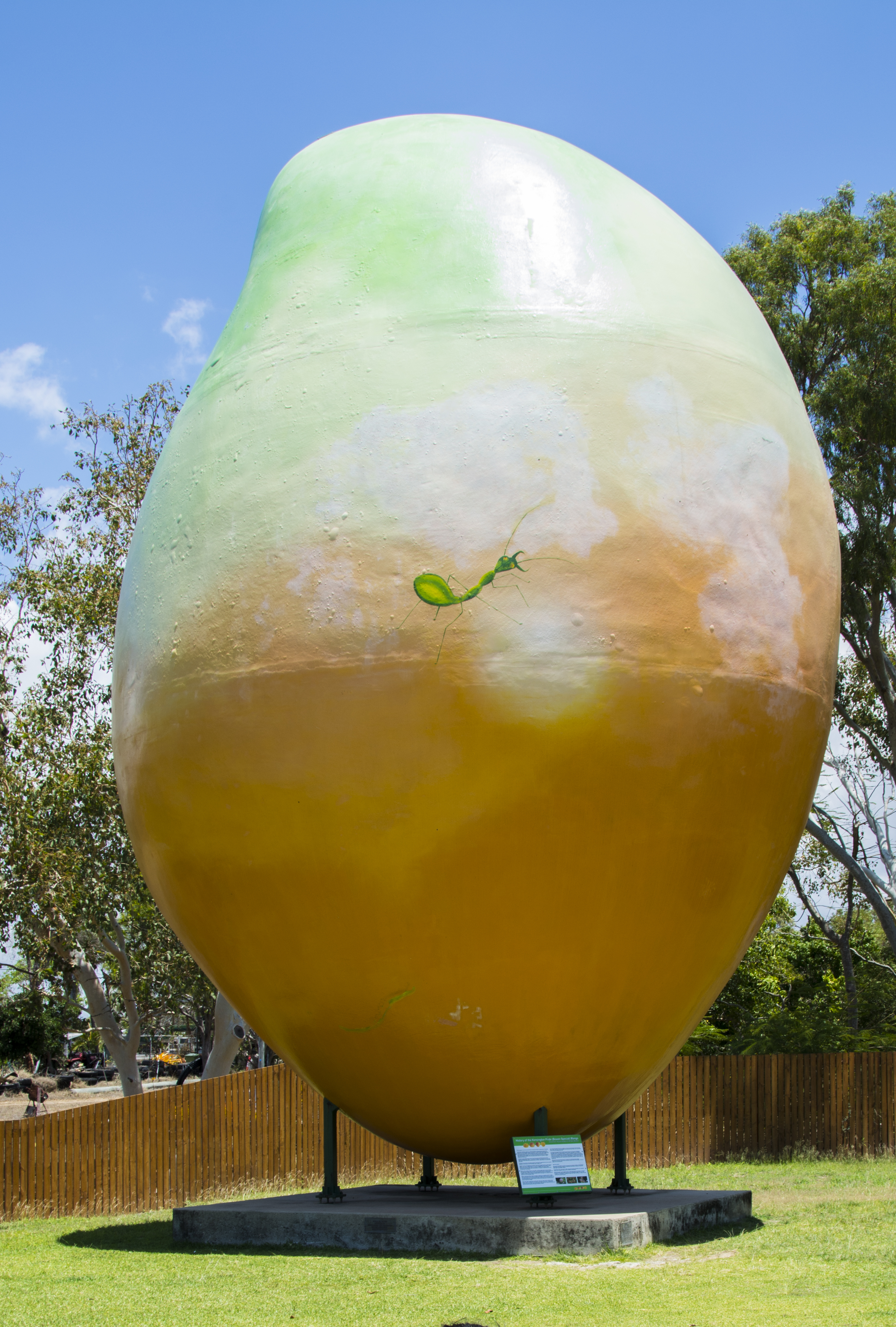
The Big Mango, Bowen, Queensland.

The "Big Mango", costing $90,000 to create, was erected in 2002 as a tourist attraction at the Bowen Tourist Information Centre. In February 2014, the 10-metre high, seven-tonne fibreglass structure was reported to be "stolen" as part of a publicity stunt for the region.

== Sport ==
The most popular sport in Bowen is rugby league. The town's local team, the Bowen Seagulls, play in the Townsville District Rugby League competition.

The Bowen Showground, off Mount Nutt Road includes a motorcycle speedway and sidecars track within the site. The track (19°59′38″S 148°13′46″E) first held racing on 27 September 1927 and hosted the Queensland Solo Championship in 2020 and 2022.

== Climate ==
Bowen has a tropical savannah climate (Köppen: Aw), with a sweltering wet season from December to April and a cooler, less humid dry season from May to November. Warm to hot weather predominates, with average maxima ranging from 31.5 °C (88.7 °F) in January to 24.5 °C (76.1 °F) in July. A partial rain shadow is produced by the nearby Gloucester Island, resulting in the annual precipitation averaging 894.9 millimetres (35.23 in). Extreme temperatures have ranged from 39.7 °C (103.5 °F) on 1 January 1985 to 3.2 °C (37.8 °F) on 12 August 2012.

Climate data for Bowen (20º01'12"S, 148º15'00"E, 6 m AMSL) (1987–2015 normals, extremes 1969–2015)
Month	Jan	Feb	Mar	Apr	May	Jun	Jul	Aug	Sep	Oct	Nov	Dec	Year
Record high °C (°F)	39.7 (103.5)	39.4 (102.9)	36.9 (98.4)	35.2 (95.4)	32.5 (90.5)	32.1 (89.8)	31.4 (88.5)	31.5 (88.7)	36.0 (96.8)	36.0 (96.8)	38.2 (100.8)	39.4 (102.9)	39.7 (103.5)
Mean daily maximum °C (°F)	31.5 (88.7)	31.3 (88.3)	30.8 (87.4)	29.3 (84.7)	27.1 (80.8)	24.9 (76.8)	24.5 (76.1)	25.4 (77.7)	27.4 (81.3)	29.2 (84.6)	30.4 (86.7)	31.3 (88.3)	28.6 (83.5)
Mean daily minimum °C (°F)	23.8 (74.8)	23.8 (74.8)	22.8 (73.0)	20.8 (69.4)	17.8 (64.0)	15.0 (59.0)	13.4 (56.1)	14.2 (57.6)	16.5 (61.7)	19.8 (67.6)	22.2 (72.0)	23.4 (74.1)	19.5 (67.0)
Record low °C (°F)	17.7 (63.9)	18.4 (65.1)	16.5 (61.7)	10.0 (50.0)	6.9 (44.4)	4.0 (39.2)	4.0 (39.2)	3.2 (37.8)	6.4 (43.5)	11.1 (52.0)	14.6 (58.3)	17.5 (63.5)	3.2 (37.8)
Average precipitation mm (inches)	179.0 (7.05)	221.1 (8.70)	118.5 (4.67)	62.2 (2.45)	41.1 (1.62)	23.3 (0.92)	19.6 (0.77)	23.0 (0.91)	10.6 (0.42)	12.1 (0.48)	52.0 (2.05)	141.4 (5.57)	894.9 (35.23)
Average precipitation days (≥ 1.0 mm)	8.8	10.5	7.1	5.4	3.9	3.3	2.0	1.6	1.2	2.0	4.2	6.7	56.7
Average afternoon relative humidity (%)	66	68	63	64	61	59	54	54	57	58	61	63	61
Average dew point °C (°F)	22.5 (72.5)	23.1 (73.6)	21.6 (70.9)	20.3 (68.5)	17.6 (63.7)	15.0 (59.0)	13.2 (55.8)	13.9 (57.0)	16.4 (61.5)	18.6 (65.5)	20.5 (68.9)	22.0 (71.6)	18.7 (65.7)
Source: Bureau of Meteorology (1987–2015 normals, extremes 1969–2015)

== Television ==
Bowen is serviced by free to air channels including the ABC, SBS, Seven Queensland (STQ), WIN Television (Nine Network affiliate), Southern Cross Television (Ten Network affiliate).

== In popular culture ==
In December 2006, it was announced that Bowen was chosen as a filming location for part of the production of Australia, directed by Baz Luhrmann and starring Nicole Kidman and Hugh Jackman. Bowen was chosen as a prospect due to the financing of $500,000 by the Queensland Government. The production moved to Bowen on 14 May 2007; the town was used to depict 1940's Darwin.

The Big Mango in Bowen is one of Australia's big things.

== Notable residents ==
- Sir Charles Newton Barton (1907–1987), commissioner of main roads and co-ordinator-general of public works.
- Edith Bethel (1871–1929), political organiser.
- Douglas James (Jim) Darwen (1906–1988), newspaper-owner and editor.
- Korah Halcomb Wills (1828–1896), mayor of Bowen

== Sister cities ==
- Oseto-cho, Japan

== See also ==
- Bowen railway station
- List of ports in Australia
