= Henry Daniel Sinclair =

Henry Daniel Sinclair (1818 – 17 March 1868) was an explorer and co-founder of Bowen, Queensland, Australia. Captain Sinclair led an expedition which resulted in the naming of Port Denison (the port of Bowen) in 1859 in the cutter Santa Barbara.

== Proposal to find a new port ==
During the second half of the nineteenth century the expansion of settlement in north-eastern Australia caused increasing problems with the carriage of freight to and from southern supply centres. In response to this problem the New South Wales Government, in 1859 (i.e. prior to the separation of Queensland), offered a substantial reward for the discovery of a suitable harbour north of Port Curtis (Gladstone) that could be more easily accessed by northern settlers. Captain Henry Daniel Sinclair, owner of the 9-ton ketch Santa Barbara, departed Sydney in August 1859 in order to locate such a suitable harbour, undertook this mission.

== 1859 voyage of Santa Barbara ==
Sinclair sailed to Rockhampton where James Gordon and Ben Poole joined the vessel. He also picked up two Aboriginal guides at Curtis Island but they soon absconded. The expedition reached the Keppel Islands in early September where they saw several communities of Aboriginal people. On 29 September, the vessel anchored at the mouth of the Burdekin River (then called the Wickham River) in Upstart Bay. Gordon and Poole went ashore to obtain water from the local people, but instead filled their tins with salt water. When they laid hold of their boat and attempted to steal it, the two men felt compelled to raise their guns at these people to get away. Sinclair was angry that they did not fire upon them and soon after he shot upon others attempting to approach the Santa Barbara in a raft. A seaman, who was alone on the Santa Barbara, was compelled to shoot at another group coming toward the vessel a few days later while they were still in the bay. Sinclair decided to return to the south-east and obtained water from the local inhabitants of Gloucester Island in exchange for tomahawks and shirts. However, when two of the Aboriginal men returned to the vessel, armed with tomahawks hidden underneath the shirt, Sinclair thought they were intending treachery and wanted to shoot them. The crew instead utilised the canoe for firewood.

On 15 October, while sailing in the western part of Edgecumbe Bay, Sinclair "discovered that we were in a most splendid harbour" which he subsequently named Port Denison, a place which he thought would fulfil the criteria of the new port wanted by the government. Sinclair stayed in the port a couple of days to survey and make personal land claims. On Station or Garden Island (now known as Stone Island) at the edge of the harbour, they found several acres of a nut-like vegetable under cultivation as well as an in-ground storage cache which the Aboriginal people used to stockpile these nuts.

With a canoe of local residents following them and a group of about thirty Aborigines seen on the mainland, Sinclair decided to leave the harbour and sail for Whitsunday Island. Here, they obtained water and made repairs to the Santa Barbara. During a friendly encounter, Sinclair was sitting on a stone when one of the Aboriginal men hit him over the head with a rock. Sinclair said that he was quite sure that they wanted to eat him as they made distinctive smacking sounds with their lips. Sinclair was able to escape with Poole and Gordon coming to his assistance, with Poole firing from both barrels of his gun. Sinclair received several wounds but recovered. James Gordon said that he "would have liked to shoot every one" of the islanders for the injuries the captain sustained. The Santa Barbara returned to Rockhampton on 3 November.

== Bowen founded but reward not given ==
By the time Sinclair petitioned to claim his reward for the discovery of a new port, the separation of Queensland had occurred and neither the New South Wales nor Queensland Government believed that it was responsible for paying the reward and so Sinclair was never paid.

The first British settlers began arriving at Port Denison as early as 19 March 1861 with Sinclair transporting a group of these people on board the Santa Barbara. The settlement was officially proclaimed on 11 April 1861 (after the separation of Queensland), and named Bowen after the Queensland Governor, Sir George Ferguson Bowen. The township of Bowen quickly grew to support the northern pastoral industry as a strategically placed supply centre and over the course of several decades the town developed into a thriving commercial port.

Sinclair stayed on in Bowen and served as harbourmaster for a number of years.

== Later life ==
In 1868, Sinclair purchased the schooner Telegraph to take up beche-de-mer fishing between Port Denison and Cape York. However, before the vessel was ready to take to sea, Sinclair died aged 50 in a sailing accident in Cleveland Bay (off Townsville) while participating in the St Patrick's Day Regatta. He was buried in the West End Cemetery in Townsville on St Patrick's Day with the burial service read by an old friend and shipmate, James Gordon. Sinclair was one of the early burials in the cemetery and his sandstone headstone is believed to be the oldest surviving headstone in the cemetery. He left a widow and five children.

== Legacy ==
On 18 October 1934, a cairn was unveiled in Santa Barbara Park in Bowen, commemorating the 75th anniversary of the landing of Captain Sinclair in Port Denison.

On 16 October 2009, the Captain Henry Sinclair monument was unveiled in the Santa Barbara Park in Bowen, commemorating 150 years since Captain Sinclair sailed into Port Denison. It was erected by the Whitsunday Regional Council.

Sinclair Bay on Cape Gloucester, Queensland is named after him.
