= Edmund Sheppard =

Edmund Sheppard (1 November 1826 – 22 December 1882) was a Puisne Judge of the Supreme Court of Queensland.

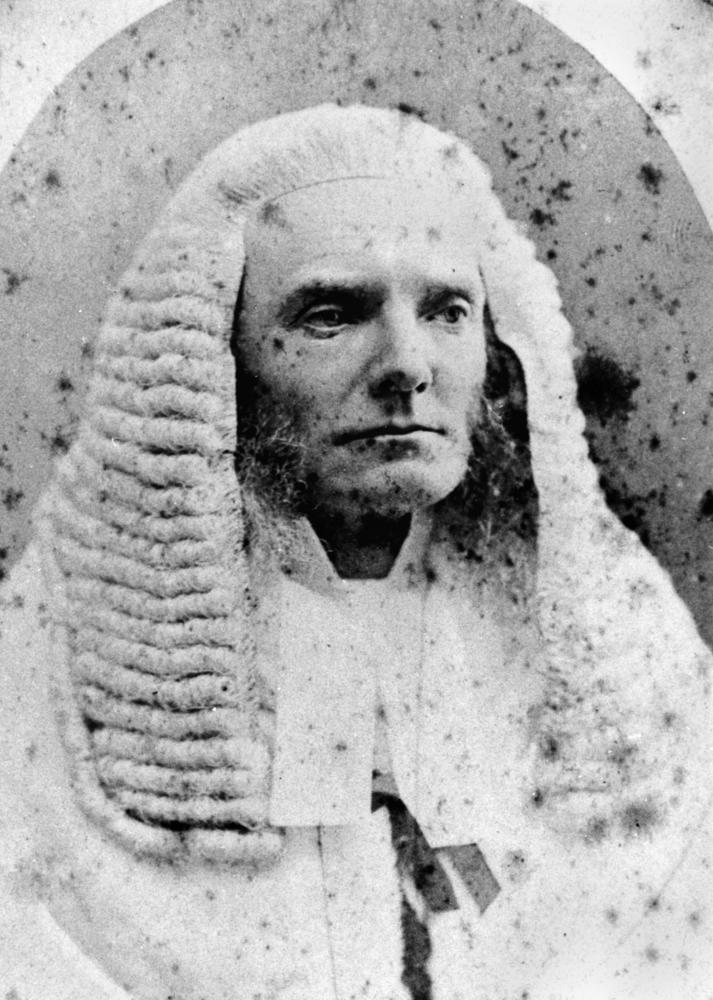
1874 Portrait of Mr. Justice Edmund Sheppard wearing his official judge's robes and wig.

== Early life ==
Sheppard was the fourth son of Samuel Sheppard, of Taunton, Somerset, England, and his wife, Harriett Deane (née Allen). Edmund was born in Taunton and educated there and in London where he was called to the bar at the Inner Temple in June 1857.

== Career in Australia ==
Sheppard went to Sydney, New South Wales, shortly after being called to the bar. Sheppard married, firstly, in July 1860, Mary Grace, daughter of the late C. E. Murray, of Sydney, who died in June 1869. He practised at the bar in Sydney, and in 1866 was appointed District Court Judge of Queensland. Judge Sheppard married, secondly, in December 1871, Adela, daughter of the late E. J. Murray, solicitor, of London. He became Puisne Judge of the Supreme Court of Queensland on 17 July 1874; and died in London on 22 December 1882 having taken leave of absence earlier in the year due to ill-health.

== Legacy ==
Sheppard's second son William Fleetwood Sheppard, became a mathematician. The court complex in Townsville, opened in 1975, was named the Edmund Sheppard Building in recognition of his service as the first Northern Judge of the court.
