= Bowen State School =

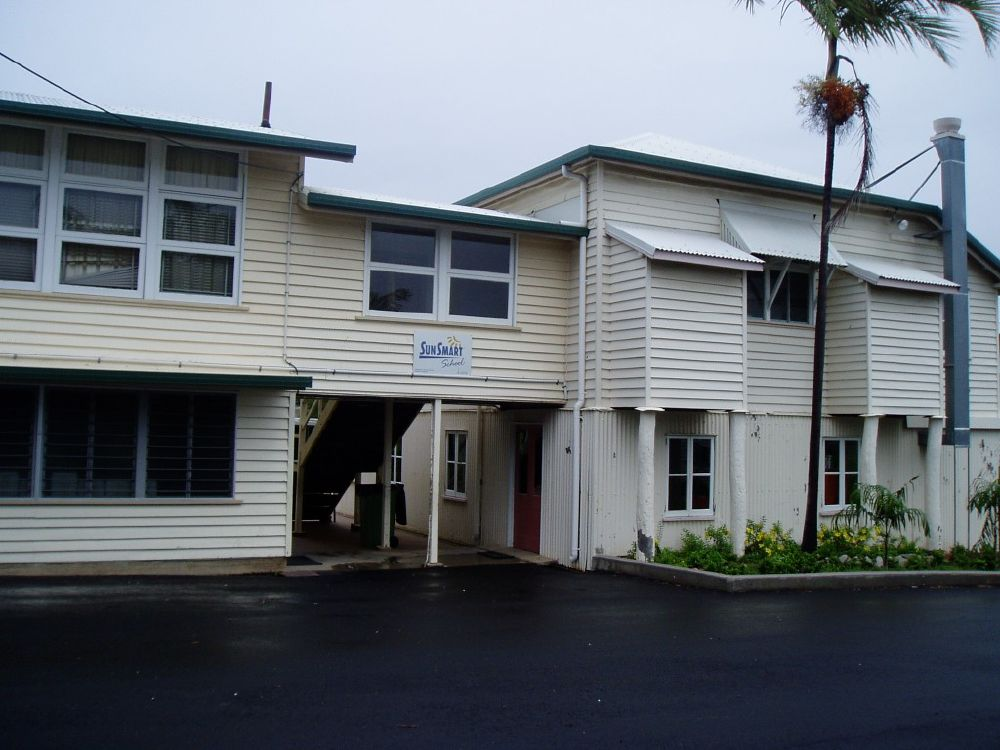
- Bowen State School, 2004

- Location within Queensland Location within Australia
- 20.0098°S 148.2435°E
- Location: 29 Kennedy Street, Bowen, Whitsunday Region, Queensland, Australia

History
- Design period: 1919–1930s (interwar period)

Site notes
- Architect(s): Robert Ferguson, Department of Public Works (Queensland)

Queensland Heritage Register
- Official name: Bowen State School
- Type: state heritage
- Designated: 21 March 2013
- Reference no.: 602817
- Significant components: school/school room

Bowen State School is a heritage-listed school at 29 Kennedy Street, Bowen, Whitsunday Region, Queensland, Australia. It was designed by Robert Ferguson and the Department of Public Works (Queensland). It was added to the Queensland Heritage Register on 21 March 2013.

== History ==
Bowen State School was established in 1865 on a large, central site within the town of Bowen. It comprises a variety of education buildings and landscape elements constructed and altered over a long period. It has been an important place of education for the Bowen community since its establishment.

Port settlements were established along the Queensland coast to serve inland pastoral districts to their west. In 1859 a site for the (then) most northern settlement of Queensland was found on the excellent natural harbour, Port Denison, to service the growing Kennedy pastoral district. It was declared a Port of Entry and Clearance in March 1861 and settlers began arriving immediately. The town of Bowen was officially proclaimed in April 1861, but by the time the town was surveyed in 1862 settlers were already pushing further north and looking for new sites for settlements.

Bowen grew quickly into a thriving commercial port. Initially, optimism for Bowen's future was high and it was thought the town would be the "capital of the north". Its population grew from an estimated 120 in May 1862 to 1192 in October 1865. Rudimentary or temporary buildings were built quickly and important institutions were established, often for the first time in North Queensland. A temporary courthouse was built in late 1860, a Church of England and a Roman Catholic church in 1863 and 1864 respectively, a permanent jetty was begun in mid-1864, a Freemasons' Lodge was established in 1865, and stores and hotels were built to serve the populace. Bowen was the first North Queensland town to have a mayor and an alderman (1863).

By August 1862, one hectare of land was granted by the Department of Lands for the construction of Bowen National School. Several small private schools were already operating in the town. While the people of Bowen raised the £750 construction cost and built the school, a temporary school operated within a local store from 3 April 1865. The school relocated to the new school building by the end of 1865. This was a brick building facing Poole Street and containing one large classroom.

Bowen's regional prominence ended in the 1870s when Townsville emerged as the principal settlement of North Queensland. Bowen's population decreased by a third between 1868 and 1871 and did not reach its former size for nearly 50 years. The decision to build the Great Northern railway line in 1877 from Townsville inland to service Charters Towers and the pastoral districts ensured the further decline of Bowen. Townsville became the premier business centre of North Queensland and the Northern Supreme Court was removed from Bowen to Townsville in 1889. Nevertheless, Bowen continued as a service town to its hinterland and retained its various civic facilities including its school.

Colonial governments played an important role in the provision of formal education. In 1848 the New South Wales Government established National Schools. This was continued by the Queensland Government after the colony's separation in 1859. The Education Act 1860 established the Queensland Board of General Education and began to standardise curriculum, teacher training, and facilities. The Education Act 1875 provided a number of key initiatives for primary education; it was to be free, compulsory and secular. The Department of Public Instruction was established to administer the Act. This move standardised the provision of education and, despite difficulties, colonial educators achieved a remarkable feat in bringing basic literacy to most Queensland children by 1900.

The provision of schools was considered an essential step in the development of early Queensland communities. The formal education of Queensland children was seen as integral to the success of a town, the colony, and the nation. Land and construction labour was often donated by the local people and schools frequently became a major focus within the community as a place symbolising progress, for social interaction, and as a source of pride. Also, the development and maintenance of schools frequently involved donations and work by teachers, parents, and pupils. Because of their significant connections with the local community, schools have occasionally incorporated other socially important elements such as war memorials and halls used for community purposes. They also typically retain a significant enduring connection with former pupils, their parents, and teachers. Social events involving a wide portion of the local community have often been held at schools, utilising the buildings and grounds – such as fetes, markets, public holiday celebrations, school break-up days, fundraisers, sporting events, reunions, and dances.

As in other Australian colonies, the Queensland Government developed standard plans for its school buildings. This helped to ensure consistency and economy. The standard designs were continually refined by government architects in response to changing needs and educational philosophy. Queensland school buildings were particularly innovative in their approach to climate control, lighting, and ventilation. Until the 1960s school buildings were predominantly timber framed, taking advantage of the material's abundance in the state and the high number of builders skilled in its use. This also allowed for easy and economical construction and enabled the government to provide facilities in remote areas. Due to the standardisation of facilities, schools across the state were developed in distinctly similar ways and became complexes of typical components. These components included: the teaching building/s, the school yard, the horse paddock that was often later configured into a sports oval, the teacher's residence, and a variety of features such as sporting facilities or play equipment, shade structures, gardens and trees.

On 30 January 1884 a cyclone damaged the brick Bowen National School building so badly it had to be demolished. School resumed in temporary accommodation while new teaching buildings were built. Previously, boys, girls, and infants (children aged 4 and 5 years old) were taught within the same classroom, although they sat separately. For the new school it was decided to separate the students and create two new schools in two separate buildings – Bowen State Boys' School and Bowen State Girls' and Infants' School. The buildings were located either side of the remnant foundations of the former brick building. The girls and infants were to the east, the boys were to the west, and a fence ran through the grounds to separate them. The boys' school building survives on the site and in 2012 is named Block D.

The new buildings were to a standard design that had been introduced in 1880 and constructed across the colony until 1893. Employed by the Department of Public Instruction, Robert Ferguson was responsible for school building design between 1879 and 1885 and he was the first to give serious consideration to the ventilation of interiors. Into the low-set, timber-framed buildings Ferguson introduced a coved ceiling and vented the roof space, improving internal temperatures. The number of windows and their size was increased; however, they were few in number and sill heights were typically over 4 feet 6 inches (1.37 m) above floor level, well above eye level of students. Modestly-decorative timber roof trusses were exposed within the space. Built to this standard design, the two new school buildings at Bowen were low-set, timber-framed structures with gable roofs, verandahs front and back, and modest "carpenter gothic" timber detailing. An undated but early site plan indicates they contained one large classroom each. The Girls' School was extended at some time to accommodate a separate room for infants and an additional classroom.

Dramatic reform of the Queensland Education system began around 1909 and continued until the beginning of World War I. During this period a high school system was introduced, technical education was expanded, the University of Queensland was inaugurated, the Queensland Teachers' Training College was established, the requirement for a local contribution of construction costs for new schools was abolished, and the leaving age was increased from 12 to 14 years. Although technically compulsory since 1875, school attendance was not enforced until 1900. Subsequently, student numbers rose across Queensland during the first 15 years of the twentieth century.

Control of building design was transferred to the Department of Public Works in 1893 and the department's architects trialled a number of technical innovations. Queensland's education architecture became markedly more advanced and the range of standard building types increased. The most noticeable change in Queensland school architecture was the introduction of high-set buildings. This provided better ventilation as well as further teaching space and a covered play space underneath. Also, windows were rearranged and enlarged and sills were lowered to approximately 1 metre (3 ft 3 in) above floor level. By 1909 windows were altered so that the maximum amount of light came from one direction and desks were rearranged so that this light fell onto the left hand side of students. Since students were forcedly right-handed, no shadow would be cast onto the page. The wall supporting the blackboard had no windows. This often meant a complete transformation of the fenestration of existing older buildings. Dormers were sometimes added to the roof to provide better light and ventilation and the larger classrooms favoured in earlier designs were partitioned to create smaller ones with better lighting. Interiors became lighter and airier and met with immediate approval from educationalists. A technical innovation developed at this time was a continuous ventilation flap on the wall at floor level. This hinged board could be opened to increase air flow into the space and, combined with a ceiling vent and large roof fleche, improved internal air quality and decreased internal temperatures effectively. This type was introduced around 1909 and was constructed until approximately 1920. Significantly, Dr Eleanor Bourne was appointed the first Medical Inspector of Schools in 1911 and under her instruction the relationship between classroom environment and child health was given prominence. Accordingly, school architecture evolved through iteration and experimentation to improve interior light and ventilation.

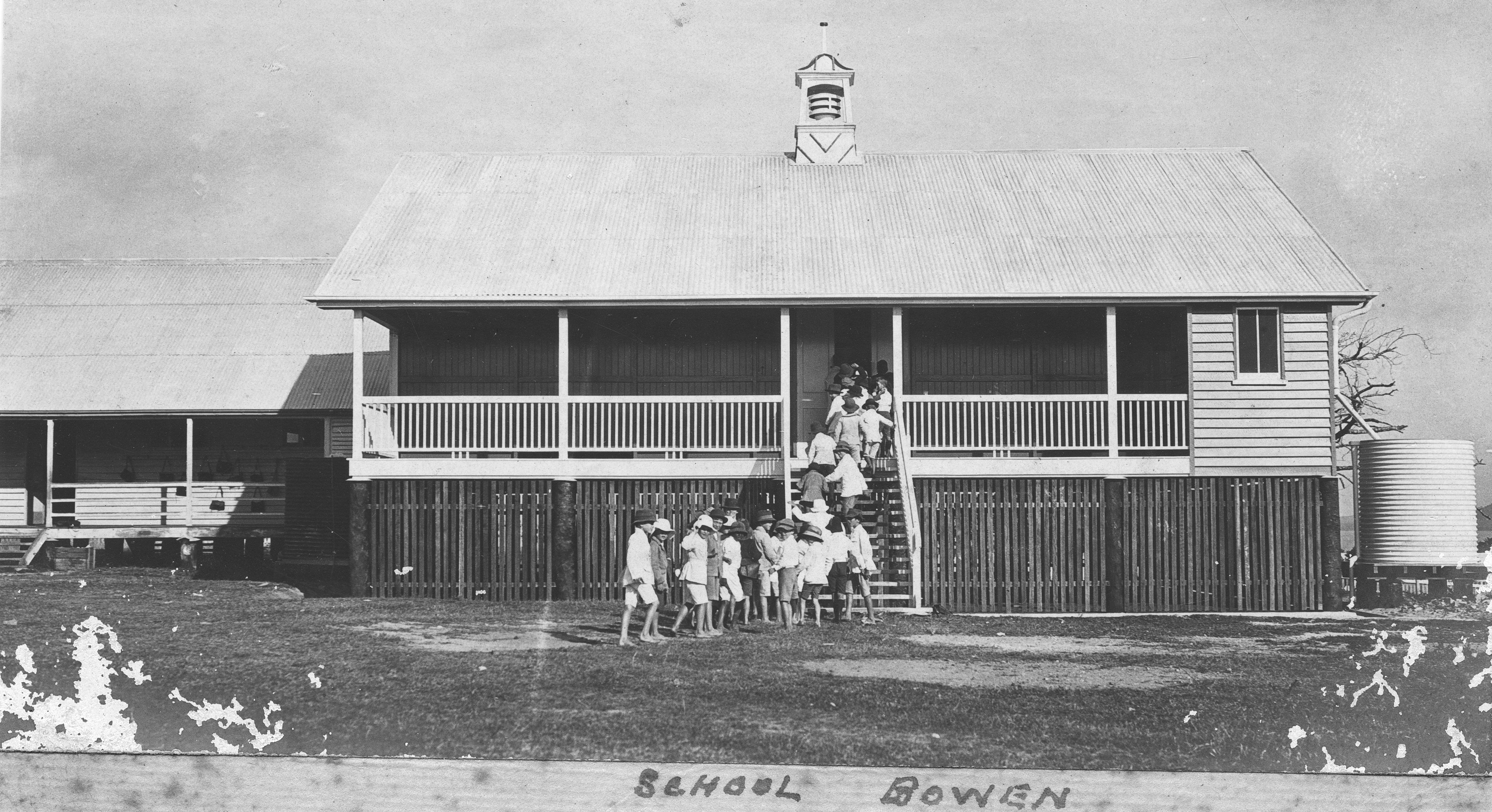
Bowen State School with roof fleche, circa 1918

Such design innovations were included in a new building for the Boys' School at Bowen, constructed in 1917 to the west of the 1884 boys' building. Called the Big Room, it was a high-set timber building with a gable roof and a northerly and southerly verandah. It had a large number of windows in the gable end walls with sill heights approximately 1 metre (3 ft 3 in) from floor level. It incorporated a hinged board, ceiling vent, and large roof fleche for ventilation. The roof fleche was removed at some time prior to 2006. This building survives and in 2012 is named Block C.

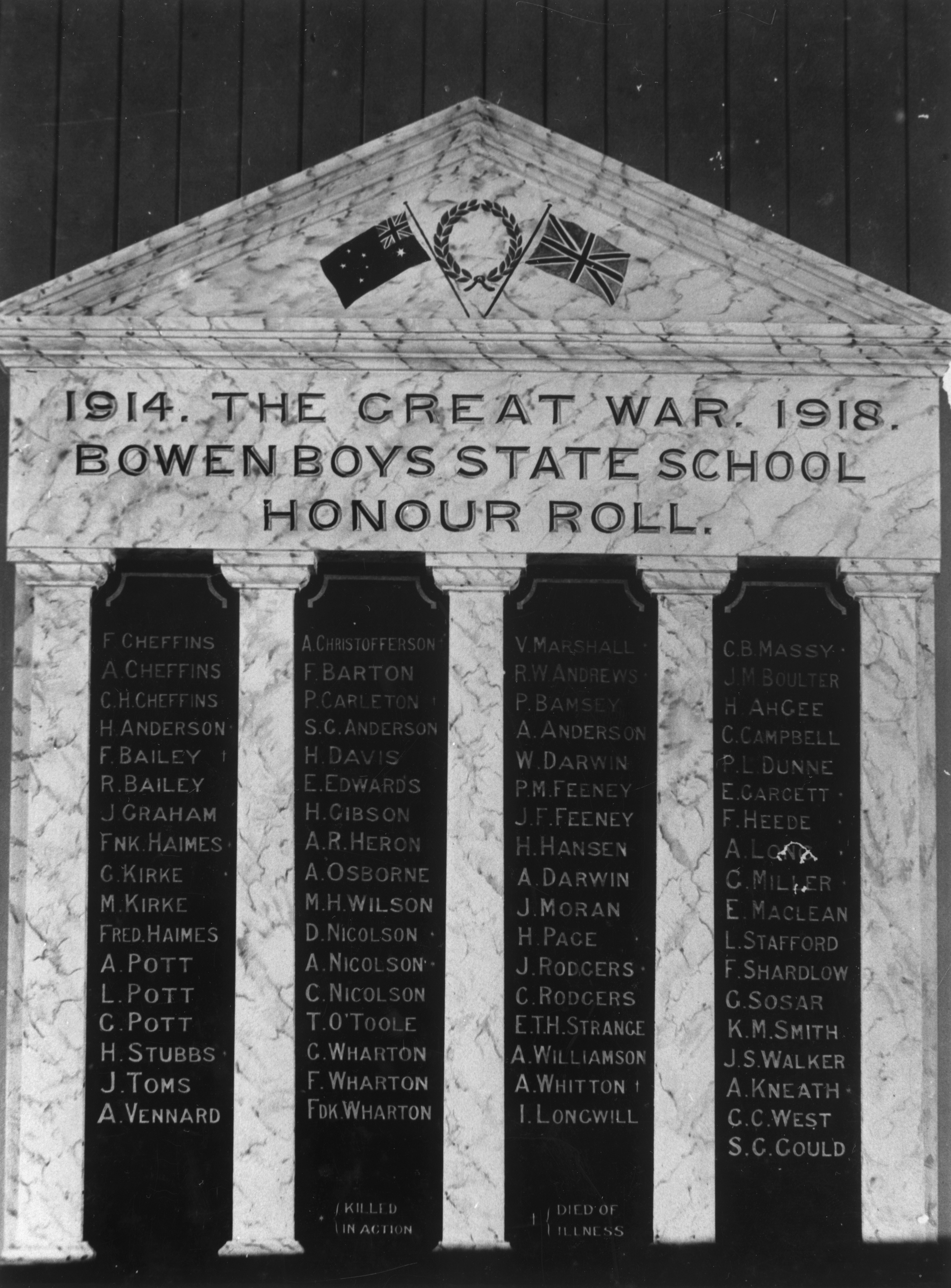
Bowen Boys State School Honour Roll

In 1919 an Honour Board memorialising 70 past students who served in World War I was installed in the Big Room and unveiled by the mayor in the presence of a crowded audience. The board took the form of a Grecian temple facade decorated to represent marble. It was claimed to be the largest in a North Queensland school, measuring 5 feet 6 inches (1.68 m) wide by 6 feet (1.8 m) high. This board was moved to the Bowen Historical Museum some time after its installation although no evidence has been discovered as to when or why it was moved.

Attention to improving light and ventilation to achieve an optimum classroom culminated in 1920 with the Sectional School type. This fundamentally new design combined all the best features of previous types and implemented theories of an ideal education environment. It proved very successful and was used unaltered until 1950. This type was practical, economical, and satisfied educational requirements and climatic needs. Most importantly, it allowed for the orderly expansion of schools over time. By late 1914, after the principles and virtues of providing natural light from the south had been espoused by Dr Bourne, buildings were preferably oriented to receive maximum natural light from the south. The Sectional School type was a high-set timber structure on timber stumps. It had only one verandah typically on the northern side, allowing the southern wall, with a maximum number of windows, to be unobstructed. The building was designed so that the western wall was removable. As the school grew, the western end wall could be detached and the building extended in sections, hence the name. This led to the construction of long narrow buildings of many classrooms – an overt, characteristic form of Queensland schools.

From at least 1915 the school committee and some of the Bowen community were calling for the amalgamation of the Boys' and Girls' and Infants' schools. It was believed this would give the students a larger facility and a better step into secondary education. In 1923 the department approved the request and amalgamated the schools to form Bowen State School. The outdated 1884 buildings were remodelled in accordance with the most recent educational ideals to emulate the Sectional School type. The Girls' and Infants' School building was moved on the site to the western side of the Big Room. Both 1884 buildings were raised and had their southern verandahs removed. The large rooms were partitioned to create three classrooms in each building. The interiors were lined with boards, new large casement windows were inserted in the southerly wall, and all other windows were removed. Desks were rearranged to face west, ensuring the ideal direction of light onto the students' page. Being more recently built, the Big Room was less altered. A projecting teacher's room was added to both the southerly and northerly verandah but otherwise it remained unaltered. The fence dividing the school was removed. Although the remodelling thoroughly updated the school buildings it did not increase the accommodation significantly.

In 1928 a large timber Dux Board was installed in the school, recording the names of the boys, girls, and junior dux of the high school. This was used until 1958 and as of 2013 is held within the school.

During the 1930s student numbers at Bowen State School grew steadily. This reflected the moderate population growth in Bowen over the 1920s and 1930s as local agriculture and mining developed. Significant policy changes were instituted by the Department of Public Instruction, expanding the provision of education to include new modes and new building types. Consequently, at Bowen State School the 1930s was a period of expansion that saw several new buildings constructed.

The Bowen Technical College had been established in 1916 in Brisbane Street, approximately 750 metres (2,460 ft) east of Bowen State School, due to the Queensland Government's greater emphasis on vocational and technical education in the early 20th century. Construction money was donated by the people of Bowen and the college opened in a new high-set timber building. The school provided day and night classes. It came under the control of the Department of Public Instruction in 1924, and was then called the Bowen Technical College High School, thereby establishing state secondary education in Bowen.

In Queensland, governments were slow to establish state secondary education, considering this to be of little relevance to Queensland's primary industry-based economy. The Grammar Schools Act 1860 provided scholarships for high-achieving students to attend elite grammar schools, although few were awarded. It was not until 1912 that the government instituted a high school system, whereby separate high schools were established in major towns or, where the student population was too small, a primary school was expanded to include a "high top". High tops were an economical measure that provided essentially the same education while utilising already established facilities. As a small agrarian town, Bowen had a relatively lesser demand for secondary education. In Queensland generally, high schools remained few in number until after World War II when secondary education was generally accepted as essential and was more widely provided for.

Students from Bowen State School had been using the technical college building from at least 1924, walking between the two sites. As a result of six years of agitation by the Bowen State School Head Teacher, the Bowen State School Committee, and through the representation of Charles Collins (MLA for Bowen) to the Department of Public Instruction and Public Works, the technical college building was moved during the 1930–31 school vacation onto the Bowen State School site. The technical college continued to operate from the school site but the building was now primarily utilised for the Bowen High Top classes. The Bowen High Top provided education to a Junior Examination level. From this, students could apply for entrance into tertiary or other further education. Subjects included science, geography, and commercial and vocational subjects. The building was positioned to the north-east of the school at right angles to the other buildings. It was connected to the verandah of the 1884 boys' school building by a raised covered walkway. The building remains on the site and in 2012 is named Block E.

Another building added to the school grounds in the 1930s was the Head Teacher's residence. Most Queensland state schools incorporated a teacher's residence on the site, particularly in rural areas. In Australia, only Queensland offered free accommodation to teachers and it was Queensland Government policy to provide accommodation for Queensland teachers from as early as 1864. This was as partial recompense for a low wage, as an incentive to increase teacher recruitment in rural areas, and to provide an onsite caretaker. Refinement of the standard residence design occurred over time, with each modification responding to teacher complaints and Teachers' Union agitation. Following World War I there was a teacher shortage and the Teachers' Union suggested this was aggravated by the inadequacy and shortage of teachers' residences. In 1930 a teachers' conference requested that residences be built at all rural schools with a student population over 40. Consequently, in 1933 a residence was constructed at Bowen State School. As with all educational buildings of the time, it was a standard design by the Department of Public Works, introduced in 1929 and constructed extensively across Queensland until 1950. It was a high-set, timber-framed structure on timber stumps with a wrap-around verandah. It accommodated three bedrooms, kitchen, and bathroom. It was located on the northern edge of the school, away from the existing teaching buildings. A sleepout was added onto the eastern side in 1939.

The Queensland Government had a distinct focus on vocational education as a way of ensuring the state's economic prosperity in primary industries. This was strengthened after World War I and evolved to provide a variety of subjects. Vocational training within primary education began in 1895 with drawing classes and grew to include domestic sciences, agriculture, and sheet metal and wood working classes. The subjects required a variety of purpose-built facilities and were initially gender segregated. Standard, purpose-designed vocational buildings were first introduced in 1928. In 1936 the Minister for Education permitted students to take vocational subjects in lieu of geography or history in the Junior Examination, increasing the subjects' popularity. In 1937 a vocational building was constructed at Bowen State School to a standard design, introduced in 1931 and constructed until 1940. It was a high-set timber building accommodating girls' domestic science classes in the upstairs portion and boys' manual training classes in the enclosed understorey. It was built free-standing within the playground to the north of the other classrooms. In 2012 this building is named Block F.

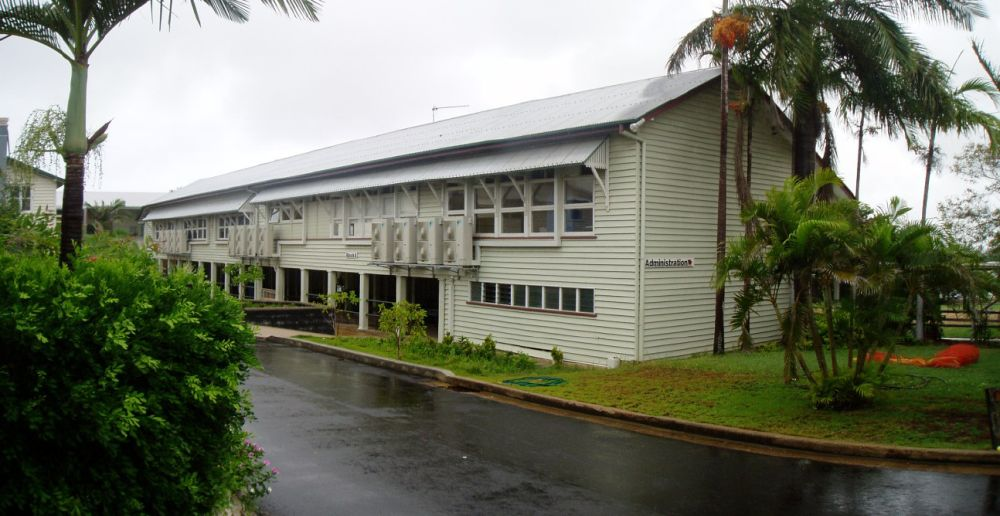
Bowen State School, Block A, 2007

The growth of Bowen State School through the 1930s culminated in the construction of a new building in 1940. Through the efforts of the School Committee and representations made by the Member for Bowen, Ernest Riordan MLA, the Department of Public Instruction agreed to erect the new building to accommodate the high growth in student numbers. It was of a Sectional School design, constructed to the west of, and connected to, the earlier buildings. It was a high-set, timber structure with western verandah. In 2012 this building is named Block A.

With the construction of this wing the school complex formed a U shape connected by raised walkways and verandahs around a large parade ground. The placement of the buildings organised the grade structure from infants in the west, the middle years at the south, and secondary education (the high top) in the east.

The grounds of Bowen State School were also upgraded in the 1930s to provide better play facilities. In 1932 the Bowen Town Council sent relief workers to the school who levelled an area near the corner of Herbert and Poole Streets, creating two tennis courts. The provision of outdoor play space was a result of the early and continuing commitment to play-based education, particularly in primary school. Trees and gardens were planted as part of beautification of the school. In the 1870s, schools Inspector AJ Boyd was critical of tropical schools and amongst his recommendations was the importance of the addition of shade trees in the playground. Arbour Day plantings began in Queensland in 1890 and were occurring at Bowen State School by the 1940s. Landscape elements were often constructed to standard designs and were intrinsic to Queensland Government education philosophies. Educationalists believed gardening and Arbour Days instilled in young minds the value of hard work and self-activity; improved classroom discipline; developed aesthetic tastes, and inspired people to stay on the land. Aesthetically designed gardens were encouraged by regional inspectors. Over time Bowen State School accumulated a variety of play and sports facilities including the sports oval at the western end of the site. After years of slowly grading the natural slope of the western horse paddock to achieve a large flat sports oval, work ceased in 1945 and an official opening ceremony was held.

During World War II, Bowen State School was short staffed (five teachers being on active service) and student numbers were down from 530 in 1939 to a little over 400. Many older students left school to seek employment and the population of Bowen declined as parents and their children evacuated to safer centres inland or further south. Initially, school hours were staggered to reduce the number of students attending during the day. The students and staff grew flowers, fruit, and vegetables within the school grounds for donation to the local hospitals and donated money and useful items to Australian soldiers on active service. The Queensland Government closed all coastal state schools in January 1942, including Bowen State School, until the war ended. During this time, sections of the school were occupied by Royal Australian Air Force personnel and teachers were reassigned to other government departments. When school resumed, enrolment rose again gradually, reaching 575 students in 1953. By then a new era of education philosophy was beginning.

The Department of Public Instruction was largely unprepared for the enormous demand for state education that began in the late 1940s and continued well into the 1960s. This was a nationwide occurrence resulting from the unprecedented population growth now termed the "baby boom". Queensland schools were overcrowded and, to cope, many new buildings were constructed and existing buildings were extended.

In the early 1950s Bowen Harbour was very busy and Bowen was becoming more prosperous due to development of Collinsville mine in the Bowen hinterland. Due to population growth spurred by the increase in coal mining and industries, school enrolment was reaching record numbers. In order to accommodate the increase, between 1953 and 1960 accommodation at Bowen State School was almost doubled. This included the extension of the high top for a science classroom, extension of the former girls' school building by two classrooms, extension of the infants' wing with three classrooms, extension of the vocational training building, enclosing verandahs for further accommodation, and building new toilets within the grounds. By 1954 a new building was on the school site, the Hall. The history of this building is unclear and it appears older than the 1950s.

Bag racks as verandah balustrades became a characteristic design element of Queensland schools after World War II and this occurred generally at Bowen State School. As a result of the changes in education philosophies and consistent with the alterations of other schools across the state, many of the buildings at Bowen State School had their fenestration altered to increase the amount of light into the classrooms, and many older windows were replaced with modern awning style windows.

Application for a "proper" high school had begun in 1928 but it was not until 1961 that Bowen State High School was established on a different site and all secondary education was removed from Bowen State School. The High Top building was made available for the primary students.

In 1965 the school held a Centenary celebration and unveiled a Centenary Gate at the Poole Street entrance.

A rocket-ship playground structure standing in the grounds of the Bowen State School was probably built in the 1960s but it is not known when it was erected on the school site. The earliest evidence of it is in a 1985 aerial photograph. Rocket-ship climbing frames were once popular in playgrounds in Australia and elsewhere in the world. Most playgrounds have now been updated with newer equipment. It is not a typical inclusion in state school playgrounds and the Bowen rocket-ship is the only identified example in a school playground in Queensland.

Between the 1960s and the 1980s a modernisation of Queensland education occurred. The Education Act 1964 was a turning point and the first major update of Queensland education's governing legislation since 1875. Effectively, a new era of state education evolved with new architectural responses needed. The Department of Education (as it had been renamed in 1957) continued to give the responsibility of building design to the architects of the Department of Public Works. Due to new materials, technologies, educational philosophies, government policies, architectural styles, and functional requirements, the evolution of standard designs became more fragmented. Rather than "improving" on the previous designs, architects began to design on a relatively clean slate, inspired by new precedents. Fundamentally, timber construction was no longer favoured and buildings were no longer predominantly high-set.

After the 1960s Bowen State School continued to expand and new buildings were added to the grounds over time. Block G containing general teaching classrooms was built in 1973 and was extended in 1980 and again by 1993. A library (Block H) was built in 1973, a pre-school in 1974, and a dental clinic in 1979; these new buildings served specific functions and resulted from expansions in Queensland education provision. These buildings were a typical addition to schools across Queensland in the 1970s. A demountable classroom building was added in 1979 and another in 1991 representing a type of prefabricated and transportable education building that was widely employed across the state. In 1997 the former Girls' and Infants' School building of 1884 was demolished and replaced with a larger, modern building (in 2012 named Block B). New toilets were built in 2006. The school grounds were extended in the 2000s to occupy a part of the neighbouring, southern block, across Poole Street. This land accommodates an oval and hall built in 2011. Poole Street was closed to traffic for a part of its length in front of the school to create a safe crossing for children. The hall across Poole Street as well as an extension of the library in 2011 was constructed as part of the nationwide Building the Education Revolution economy stimulus, a typical addition to schools across Queensland. Extensive shade structures have also been constructed over outdoor areas including one of the tennis courts.

In 2012, the school continues to operate from the site and is the principal state primary school in Bowen. The school retains a complex of significant buildings constructed between 1884 and 1958 that have been altered over time in accordance to evolving educational requirements. The school is important to the town and district having operated since 1865 and having taught generations of Bowen students. Since establishment it has been a key social focus for the Bowen community with the grounds and buildings having been the location of many social events over time.

In 2014, the school had 481 students enrolled with 34 teachers (30 equivalent full-time).

=== Notable students ===
- Thomas Joseph Byrnes, Premier of Queensland

== Description ==
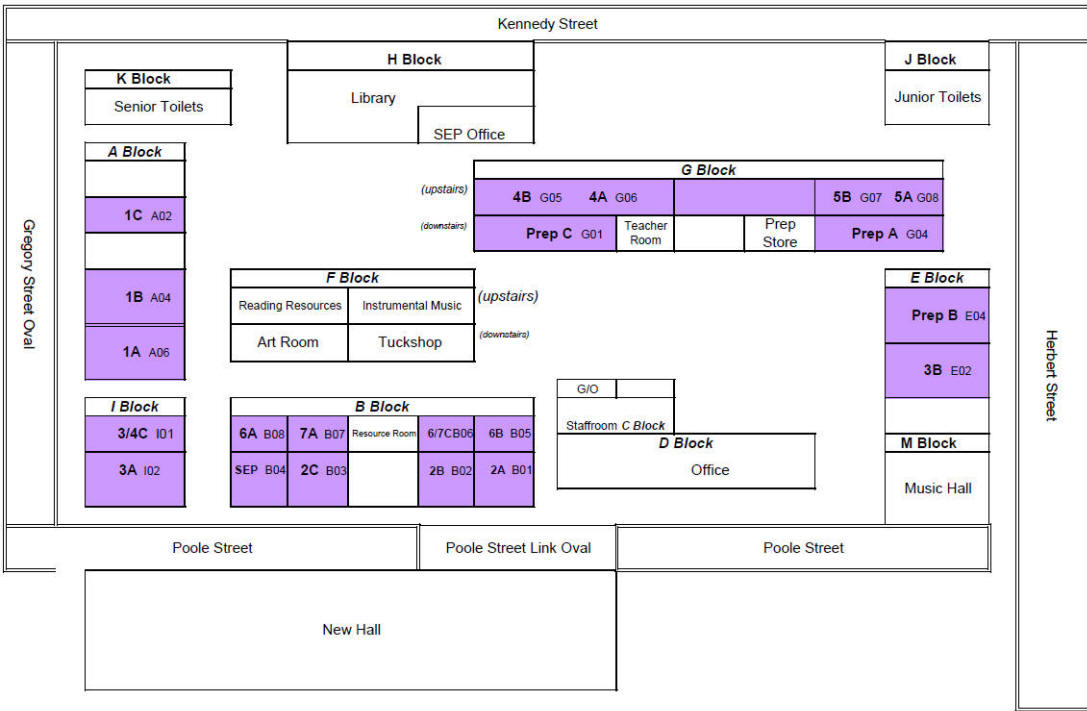
Bowen State School plan, June 2015

Bowen State School is located on the northern perimeter of the central business district in the town of Bowen. The school site is a level, two-hectare block bound by Gregory, Kennedy, Poole and Herbert streets. Centrally located on the site, the school complex comprises a number of high-set, timber-framed buildings, some forming a U shape around a central parade ground. The open space at the ends of the block includes the sports oval to the west and tennis and basketball courts to the east. The school site also encompasses land and buildings across Poole Street with the road partially closed to provide pedestrian access between the two sites. School buildings are built to Departments of Public Instruction and Public Works designs.

=== Block D, 1884 (former boys' school building) ===
Identified as standard type B/T4, Block D retains important fabric that identifies it as an 1880s Robert Ferguson design. It is a rectangular high-set, timber-framed building with a northern verandah and a gable roof. The walls are clad with weatherboards with ventilated gable ends, and the roof is clad with corrugated metal sheeting. The verandah has stop-chamfered posts and, although the roof space was not inspected, it is likely that the coved ceiling and timber roof trusses survive behind the later suspended ceiling. Important surviving evidence of the 1922 conversion of the 1884 building to reflect the Sectional School ideal are the high-set form, verandah on the northern side, windows in the southern wall (the windows themselves, not being original fabric, are not of cultural heritage significance), and the timber-framed window hood with timber brackets. The verandah has a balustrade of bag racks typical of the designs introduced in the 1950s. Formerly a single large space, the school room is partitioned into small rooms for administration use. These partitions are not of cultural heritage significance. The glass louvres in the northern verandah wall are not of cultural heritage significance.

=== Block C, 1917 (The Big Room) ===
Identified as standard type C/T2, Block C retains important fabric that identifies it as an early Department of Public Works design. It is a high-set, timber-framed building with a northern and southern verandah and a gable roof. Four sets of timber stairs provide access to the verandahs and the northern verandah is connected to Block D to the east. The walls are clad with weatherboards and the roof with corrugated metal sheeting. Both the gable end walls have a panel of ventilating weatherboards. The verandah walls are single-skin, lined internally, with chamfered stud framing exposed externally. The verandah walls have a ventilation flap at floor level and retain original double leaf doors with pivoting fanlights. The southern verandah retains a hat room enclosure at its southern end. The interior is partitioned into two rooms connected by a large opening; this partition is not of cultural heritage significance. The interior walls and ceiling are lined with v-jointed tongue and groove timber boards. The ceiling is coved and has a latticed ventilation panel. Timber tie beams at cornice level are exposed in the space. The fenestration pattern remains intact with windows only in the eastern and western walls sheltered by original timber hoods with timber brackets and battened cheeks. The northern verandah is enclosed at the western end. A small teacher's room projects from both verandahs. A small enclosure of the northern verandah accommodates a store room that is not of cultural heritage significance.

=== Block E, 1914 ===
Block E as moved to Bowen State School 1930–31 (former technical college/high top) and is not a standard type. Block E retains important fabric that identifies it as an individually-designed technical educational building from the 1910s. It is a rectangular high-set, timber-framed building with a gabled hip roof and a verandah on the eastern and southern sides. The external walls are clad with weatherboards and the roof with corrugated metal sheeting. The eastern verandah ceiling is lined with timber v-jointed boards. An area of more recent lining indicates the position of a now- removed entry gable. Timber verandah posts and scalloped timber valance are original. At the southern end of the verandah is an intact hat room from the 1930–31 conversion for High Top use. The verandah balustrade is a later bag rack form. The building does not retain original windows or doors. The interior retains its original technical college layout with internal partitions dividing the space into classrooms accessible from the verandah. The walls and coved ceilings are lined with v-jointed tongue and groove timber boards. Timber roof framing beams are exposed within the classrooms.

=== Residence, 1932 ===
Identified as standard type D/R3, the school residence retains important fabric of an interwar Department of Public Works teacher's residence. It is a high-set, timber-framed building with a hipped roof. It has a verandah wrapping around the eastern and northern sides, enclosed on the northern side with windows. An enclosed sleepout is on the southern side. The verandah walls are single skin with stop-chamfered framing exposed externally. The external walls are clad with weatherboards and the roof, which is continuous over the verandahs, is clad with corrugated metal sheeting. Some windows retain original fanlights and original timber hoods with battened cheeks. The interior layout is intact accommodating three bedrooms, a living room, kitchen with pantry and stove recess, toilet, and bathroom. The walls are single-skin, vertical, v-jointed timber boards with moulded timber belt rails. The ceilings are lined with v-jointed, tongue-and-groove boards. Original internal timber panelled doors with glazed fanlights and glazed French doors with glazed fanlights open onto the verandahs. The understorey retains some original timber perimeter battening and a small laundry enclosure under the kitchen. The house is located within a fenced yard separating it from the school grounds. The house yard is grassed and contains trees.

=== Block F, 1937/1957 (former vocational building) ===
Identified as standard type E/T3, Block F retains important fabric that identifies it as a standard interwar vocational building. It is a high-set, timber-framed building in two parts linked by an enclosed raised walkway.

The 1937 building is clad with weatherboards and has a hipped roof clad with corrugated metal sheeting. The understorey is enclosed with corrugated metal sheeting. The windows on both levels are timber- framed casements or double-hung sashes, both with fanlights and original hardware. Some windows are sheltered by large timber awnings with timber brackets and battened cheeks. Two projecting stove recesses are on the northern side. Timber stairs provide access to the upper level as well as to the connecting walkway linking the two building parts. The walls and ceilings of the upper level are lined with v-jointed, tongue-and-groove boards with moulded architraves and timber splay skirtings. It has high-waisted, panelled timber doors with fanlights and original hardware. The main room has a latticed ventilation panel in the ceiling and in 2012 the building houses various items of early school furniture and school equipment.

The later extension to Block F is clad externally on both levels with weatherboards and the gable roof is clad with corrugated metal sheeting. At the apex of the gable end walls are ventilated weatherboards. The building has timber-framed, awning windows with fanlights and simple hoods without brackets. A steel-framed lean-to awning is attached to the southern side of the understorey and is not of cultural heritage significance. The upper level interior walls and ceiling are lined with fibrous sheeting material.

=== Block A, 1940 (former infants' building) ===
Identified as standard type D/T1, Sectional School Block A retains important fabric that identifies it as a standard Sectional School type. It is a long, narrow, timber-framed building, high-set, with a western verandah and a gable roof. The walls are clad with weatherboards and the roof with corrugated metal sheeting. The verandah has a balustrade of bag racks and the verandah ceiling is lined with fibrous sheeting with cover strips. Verandah doors are original double leaf timber doors with original fanlights. The verandah wall has glass louvres that are not of cultural heritage significance. The eastern wall windows are sheltered by a timber hood with timber brackets and battened cheeks. The eastern windows are timber awning windows with fanlights. The fanlights are not original. The interior layout is somewhat intact with some partitions between classrooms containing later concertina doors.

=== The Hall, 1954 ===
Not a standard type, the Hall is a rectangular, high-set, timber-framed building with a gable roof. The walls are clad with weatherboards and the roof is clad with corrugated metal sheeting. The windows are a mixture of modern aluminium-framed sliders, timber-framed awning windows, and double- hung sashes. All have louvred fanlights. The interior contains one large room and is lined with v-jointed, tongue-and-groove boards on the coved ceiling and some walls. Other walls are lined with plasterboard sheeting. Timber tie beams are exposed within the space.

Other school buildings on the site have not been assessed for their heritage significance.

=== Landscape Elements ===
The buildings are separated by landscaped areas containing gardens and trees or by hardscaped areas with shade structures. This space is integral to the cultural heritage significance of the buildings by allowing for the intended air movement and daylight into the buildings.

The western end of the site is a grassed sports oval and a steel rocket-ship playground structure is nearby. At the eastern corner of the site near Herbert and Poole Street intersection are two tennis courts. Steel-framed shade structures are not of cultural heritage significance.

A simple arched entrance is located in the Poole Street fence aligned with Block C. Called the Centenary Gate, it is formed from galvanised pipe and bears the school name in large metal letters.

== Heritage listing ==
Bowen State School was listed on the Queensland Heritage Register on 21 March 2013 having satisfied the following criteria.

The place is important in demonstrating the evolution or pattern of Queensland's history.

Bowen State School (established in 1865 as Bowen National School) is important in demonstrating the evolution of state education in Queensland and the associated evolution of government education architecture. One of the oldest public schools established in Queensland, Bowen State School retains a significant complex of buildings and landscape elements that illustrate the development of government education philosophies from the 1880s to the 1950s.

The place is important in demonstrating the principal characteristics of a particular class of cultural places.

Bowen State School is important in demonstrating the principal characteristics of Queensland state schools. The site planning (U shape of buildings around a parade ground) demonstrates the education grade structure and the buildings are good examples of standard government designs – architectural responses to the prevailing government educational philosophies. In particular, the standard designs represented at Bowen are Block C (C/T2), the residence (D/R3), and Block F (E/T3). Significant elements or features include; high-set timber framed and clad structures, verandahs, passive ventilation techniques (hinged wall flap, operable windows and fanlights, ceiling and wall vents), and passive day lighting consideration (large areas of windows, one room wide floor plans).

The place has a strong or special association with a particular community or cultural group for social, cultural or spiritual reasons.

Bowen State School has a strong, special, and ongoing association with the Bowen community. It was established through the efforts and funds of the people of the town in 1865 and has taught generations of Bowen children. The place is important for its contribution to the educational development of Bowen and is a prominent community focal point and gathering place for social events with widespread community support.
