= Gloucester Island National Park =

National park in Queensland, Australia

- IUCN category II (national park)
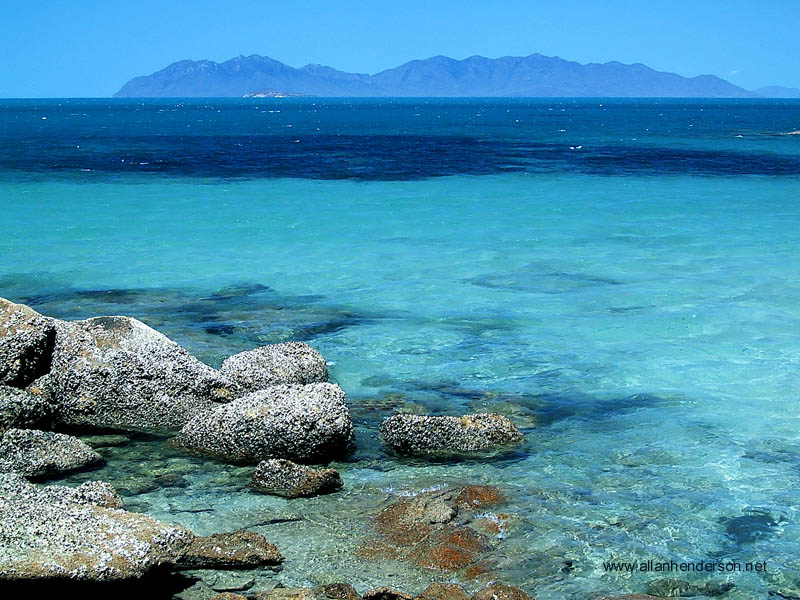
- Gloucester Island

- Location within Queensland
- Location: Queensland
- Nearest city: Bowen
- Coordinates: 20°00′55″S 148°27′18″E
- Area: 29.60 km^{2} (11.43 sq mi)
- Established: 1994
- Governing body: Queensland Parks and Wildlife Service

Gloucester Island National Park is a protected area in Queensland, Australia, 950 km northwest of Brisbane. The national park includes Gloucester Island and all or parts of some neighbouring islands. It is visible from the town of Bowen.

== Geography ==
The average altitude of the terrain is 34 metres.

== History ==
The island was seen and erroneously named "Cape Gloucester" by British explorer James Cook in 1770. Subsequently, the Admiralty's hydrographer transferred the name to the cape on the mainland immediately south of the island, which is still known as Cape Gloucester.

== Attractions ==
Birdwatching is popular from October to April, when thousands of migrating birds can be seen, especially waders.

== See also ==
- Protected areas of Queensland
