= Edgecumbe Bay =

Bay in Queensland, Australia

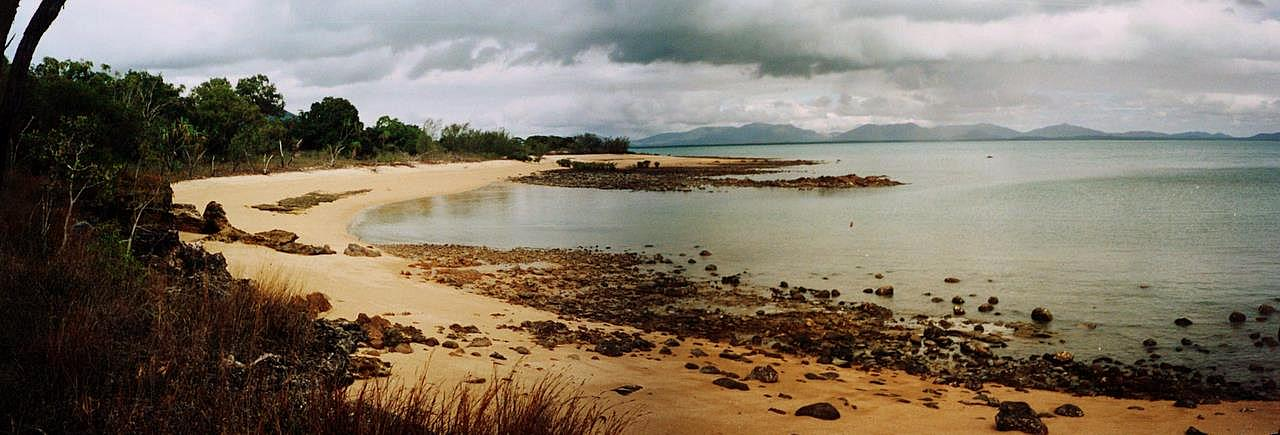
Edgecumbe Bay, 1990

Edgecumbe Bay is a bay in the Whitsunday Region, Queensland, Australia.

== Geography ==
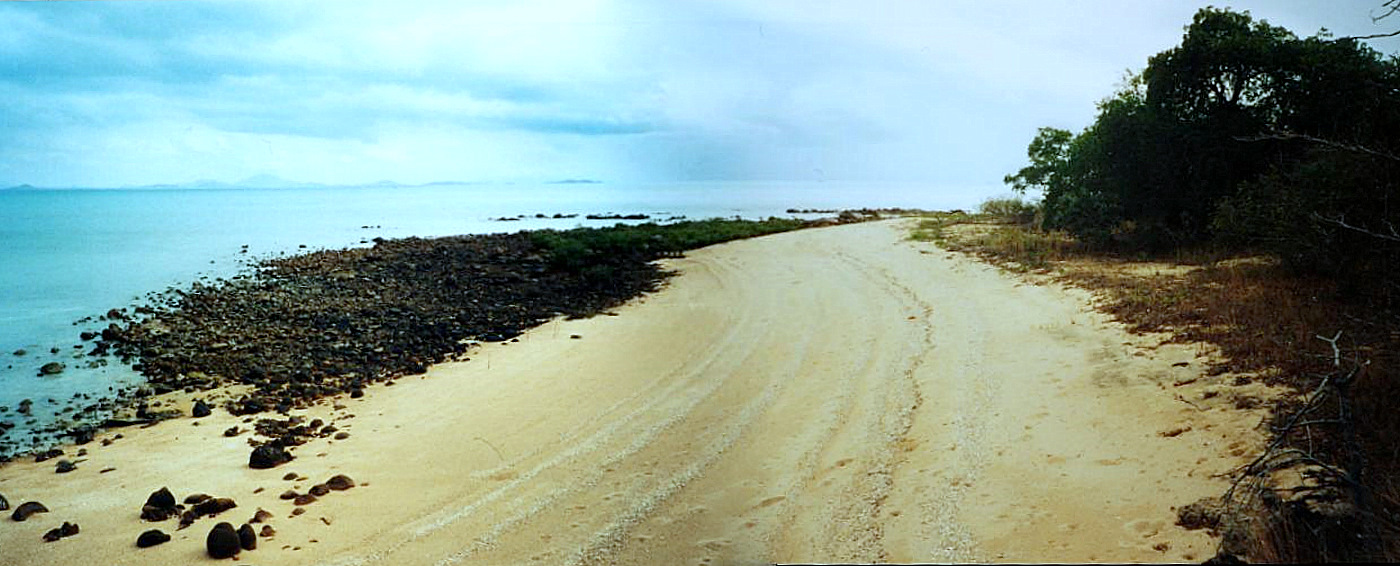
Edgecumbe Bay, just north of Sunset Beach, 1990

It is part of the Coral Sea. It is between the headlands of Cape Edgecumbe (at its western extent, 19.9764°S 148.2600°E) and Cape Gloucester (at its eastern extent, 20.0619°S 148.45361°E). From west to east, its coastline is with the localities of Bowen, Gregory River, and Cape Gloucester.

== History ==
The bay was named by Lieutenant James Cook on 4 June 1770 in honour of George Edgcumbe, 1st Earl of Mount Edgcumbe.

== Environment ==
The bay is a protected area for dugongs.
