= Lake Proserpine, Queensland =

Lake Proserpine
- Suburb
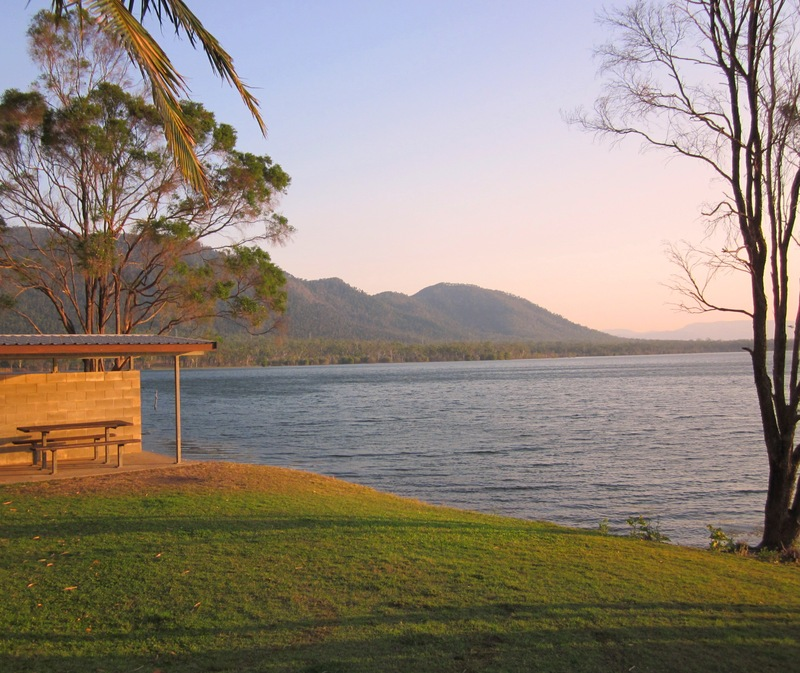
- Peter Faust Dam, 2011

- Interactive map of Lake Proserpine
- Coordinates: 20.4155°S 148.2977°E
- Country: Australia
- State: Queensland
- LGA: Whitsunday Region
- Location: 24.4 km (15.2 mi) W of Proserpine; 150 km (93 mi) NNW of Mackay; 287 km (178 mi) SE of Townsville; 1,111 km (690 mi) NNW of Brisbane

Government
  - State electorate: Whitsunday
  - Federal division: Dawson

Area
  - Total: 268.8 km^{2} (103.8 sq mi)

Population
  - Total: 6 (2021 census)
  - Density: 0.0223/km^{2} (0.058/sq mi)
- Time zone: UTC+10:00 (AEST)
- Postcode: 4800
Suburbs around Lake Proserpine
Bowen	Bowen	Mount Pluto
Bogie	Lake Proserpine	Crystal Brook; Dittmer
Bogie	Andromache	Pauls Pocket

Lake Proserpine is a rural locality in the Whitsunday Region, Queensland, Australia. In the 2021 census, Lake Proserpine had a population of 6 people.

== Geography ==
The locality completely surrounds the body of water impounded by the Peter Faust Dam (20.3661°S 148.3831°E) on the Proserpine River, which is known as Lake Proserpine (20.3667°S 148.3333°E). The Proserpine River enters the locality from the south (Andromache) and flows north until it reaches Lake Proserpine, after which it passes through the dam and then exits the locality to the east (Crystalbrook).

The Proserpine State Forest is in the north-east and south-east of the locality. Mount Pluto is with the north-eastern part of state forest (20.3433°S 148.3666°E) and rises to 559 metres (1,834 ft) above sea level. In Roman mythology, Pluto is the god of the underworld who abducts Proserpina, after whom the Proserpine River is named.

Apart from the state forest, the land use is predominantly grazing on native vegetation with some crop growing. Some parts of the locality remain undeveloped.

== History ==
In 1986, construction commenced on the Peter Faust Dam to be used for flood mitigation during the wet season and irrigation. The dam was completed in 1990.

== Demographics ==
In the 2016 census, Lake Proserpine had a population of 9 people.

In the 2021 census, Lake Proserpine had a population of 6 people.

== Education ==
There are no schools in the locality. The nearest government primary and secondary schools are is Proserpine State School and Proserpine State High School, both in Proserpine to the east. There is also a Catholic primary-and-secondary school in Proserpine.
