= Midge Point, Queensland =

Midge Point
- Town
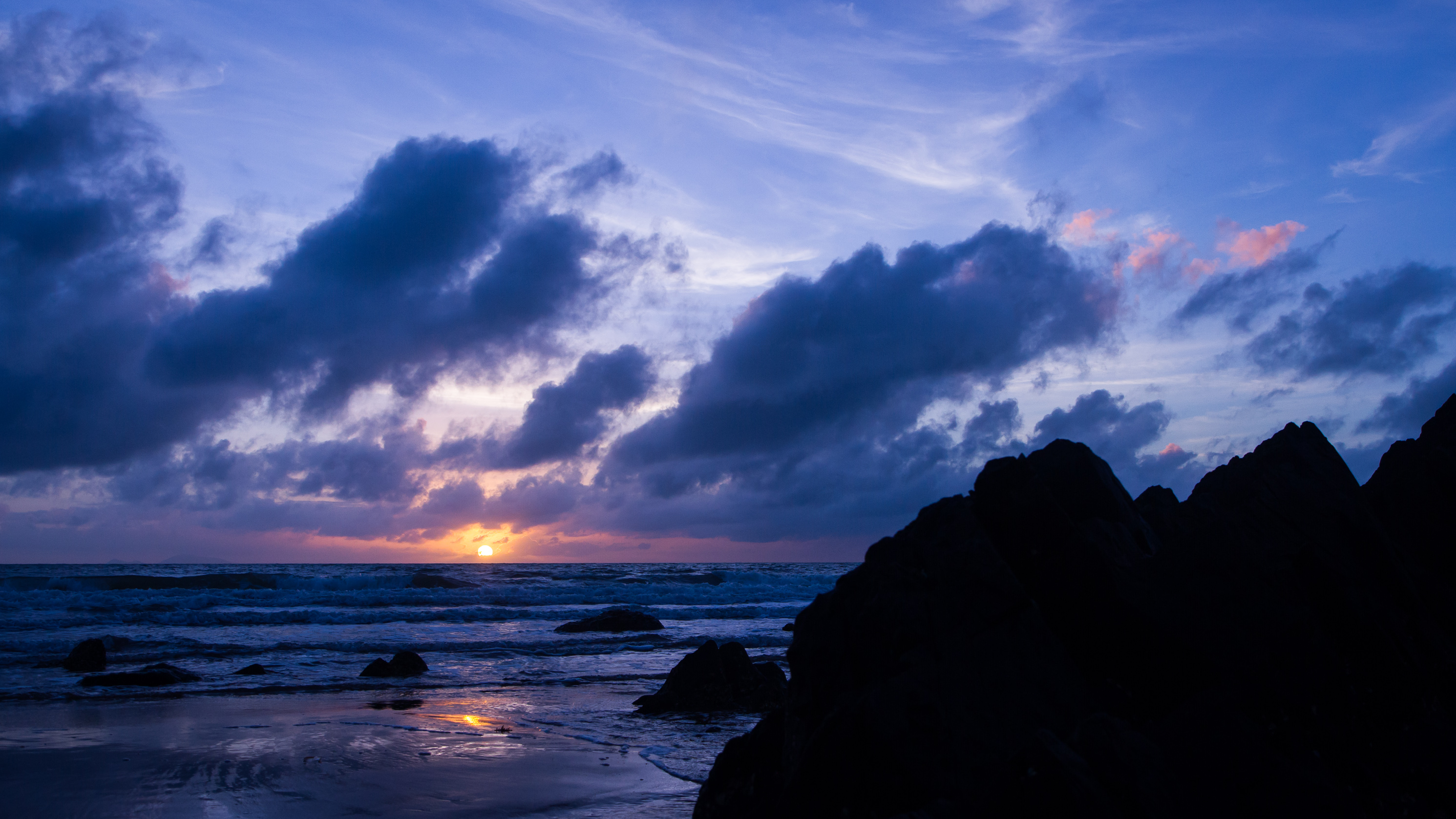
- Midge Point sunrise, 2013

- Interactive map of Midge Point
- Coordinates: 20.6491°S 148.7213°E
- Country: Australia
- State: Queensland
- LGA: Mackay Region
- Location: 35.5 km (22.1 mi) SSE of Proserpine; 102 km (63 mi) NW of Mackay; 297 km (185 mi) SE of Townsville; 1,047 km (651 mi) NNE of Brisbane

Government
  - State electorate: Whitsunday
  - Federal division: Dawson

Area
  - Total: 29.9 km^{2} (11.5 sq mi)

Population
  - Total: 435 (2021 census)
  - Density: 14.55/km^{2} (37.68/sq mi)
- Time zone: UTC+10:00 (AEST)
- Postcode: 4799
- Mean max temp: 30.2 °C (86.4 °F)
- Mean min temp: 17.3 °C (63.1 °F)
- Annual rainfall: 1,294.5 mm (50.96 in)
Localities around Midge Point
Bloomsbury	Laguna Quays	Coral Sea
Bloomsbury	Midge Point	Coral Sea
Bloomsbury	Mentmore	Coral Sea

Midge Point is a coastal town and rural locality in the Mackay Region, Queensland, Australia. In the 2021 census, the locality of Midge Point had a population of 435 people.

== Geography ==
Midge Point is on the Whitsunday Coast and is the only settlement on the western shores of Repulse Bay (except the Laguna Quay Resort - Currently Closed) until Conway Beach via Proserpine, (Conway by boat 20 kilometres (12 mi) away) and nothing south until St Helens (by boat 24 kilometres (15 mi) away).

Midge Point is the headland (20.6621°S 148.7176°E) from which the town takes its name.

Midge Mountain (20.6625°S 148.7167°E) rises to 60 metres (200 ft).

Midge Point closest major town being Proserpine in the Whitsunday Region. Although the Bruce Highway does not pass through Midge Point, it passes through the adjacent town of Bloomsbury with a turnoff to Midge Point Road, offering the traveller a scenic drive to Proserpine via Laguna Quay's.

Whitsunday Coast Airport (PPP) is only 24.2 kilometres (15.0 mi) away.

== History ==
In 1937 it was proposed to establish a town, called Midgetown, at Midge Point on 40 acres acquired from farmer A.P. Nielsen. However, the town lots could not be sold until a road had been constructed, including a bridge over the O'Connell River. In November 1938, the Queensland Government and the Pioneer Shire Council had not come to an agreement in relation to paying for the road, so the Queensland Government decided to release the land prior to the road's development. On 23 December 1938, the first town land sites were sold in Midgeton. At the time, Midgeton was described as follows:

"Midgeton is noted for its large stretch of unbroken sandy beachand safe bathing. A grassy esplanade runs to high-water mark, and there is a plentiful supply of fresh water. In adjacent waters there are excellent fishing grounds and a number of good catches were reported during the holidays."

In 1973 the town's name was changed to Midge Point.

== Demographics ==
In the 2016 census, the locality of Midge Point had a population of 464 people.

In the 2021 census, the locality of Midge Point had a population of 435 people.

== Education ==
There are no schools in Midge Point. The nearest government primary school is Bloomsbury State School in neighbouring Bloomsbury to the east. The nearest government secondary school is Proserpine State High School in Proserpine to the north.

== Amenities ==
The Mackay Regional Council operates a mobile library service on a fortnightly schedule at Nielsen Parade. (currently not in service)

== Attractions ==
Midge Point offers tranquility and remoteness from major towns. Exceptional fishing and crabbing, with boat access via the beach by tractor. The beach is 1.8 kilometres (1.1 mi) long, south east facing with views to Gould island and Midge Island.The sandy low gradient shallow nature of the bay shore is great for families wanting a day out, kite flying and horse riding.
