= Andromache, Queensland =

Andromache
- Suburb
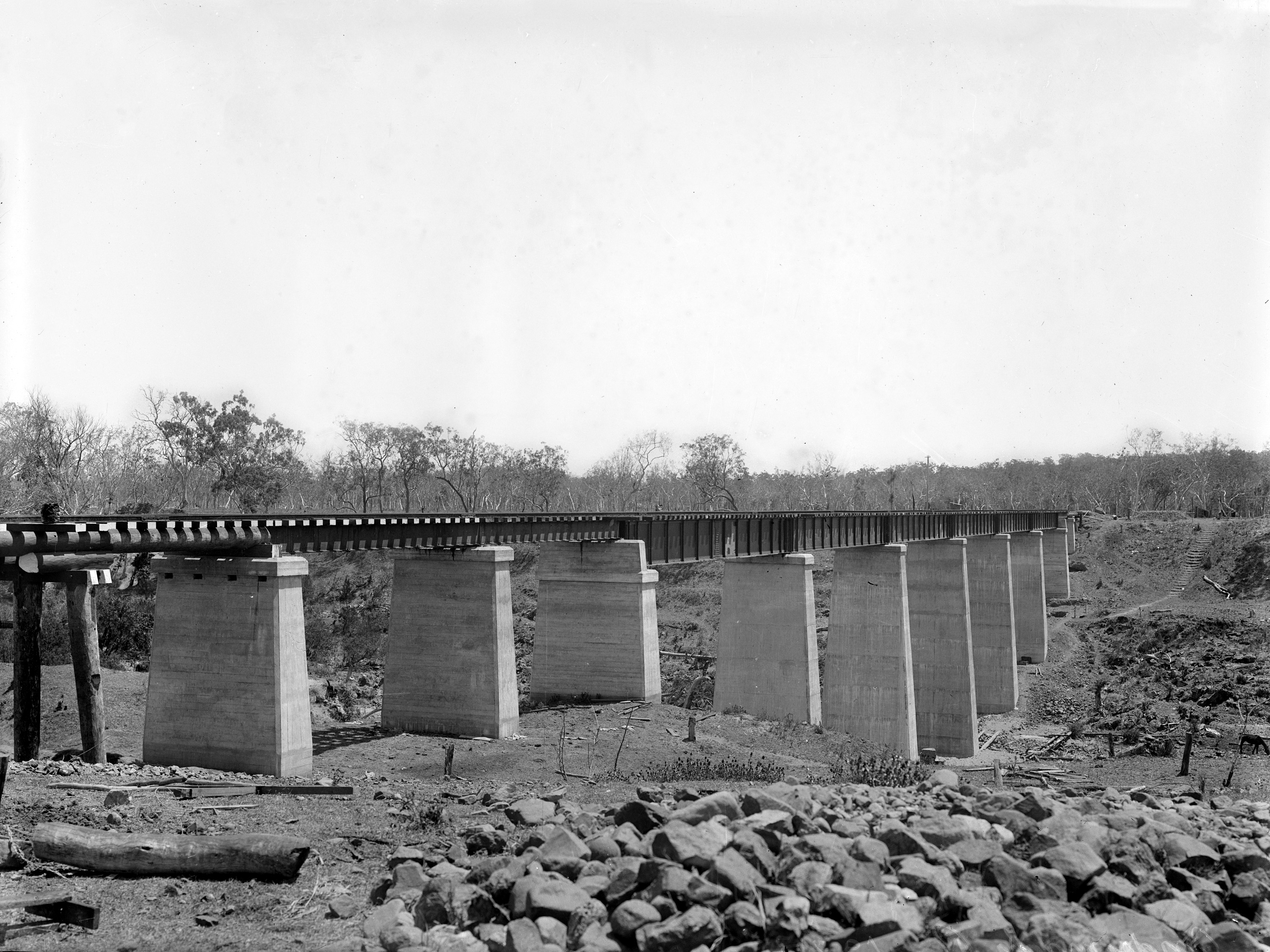
- Andromache River railway bridge, 1923

- Interactive map of Andromache
- Coordinates: 20.5958°S 148.4097°E
- Country: Australia
- State: Queensland
- LGA: Whitsunday Region
- Location: 35.3 km (21.9 mi) SW of Proserpine; 139 km (86 mi) NW of Mackay; 299 km (186 mi) SE of Townsville; 1,109 km (689 mi) NNW of Brisbane

Government
  - State electorate: Whitsunday
  - Federal division: Dawson

Area
  - Total: 423.1 km^{2} (163.4 sq mi)

Population
  - Total: 17 (2021 census)
  - Density: 0.0402/km^{2} (0.1041/sq mi)
- Time zone: UTC+10:00 (AEST)
- Postcode: 4800
Suburbs around Andromache
Lake Proserpine	Pauls Pocket	Goorganga Creek
Bogie	Andromache	Thoopara
Bogie	Bloomsbury	Bloomsbury

Andromache is a rural locality in the Whitsunday Region, Queensland, Australia. In the 2021 census, Andromache had a population of 17 people.

== Geography ==
The Clarke Range loosely forms the south-western boundary of the locality.

The Andromache River rises in Bogie to the west and meanders in an easterly direction through the locality of Andromache before exiting to the south-east (Thoopara / Bloomsbury) after which it becomes a tributary of the O'Connell River.

The North Coast railway line forms part of the locality's eastern boundary, entering from the south-east (Bloomsbury) and exits to the east (Thoopara).

Andromache has the following mountains (from north to south):

- Mount Hector (20.5912°S 148.3832°E), rising to 890 metres (2,920 ft) above sea level
- Dingo Mountain (20.6265°S 148.5451°E) 214 metres (702 ft)
- Pine Mountain (20.6451°S 148.3708°E) 735 metres (2,411 ft)

The Andromache State Forest is in the west of the locality, while the Proserpine State Forest is in the north of the locality extending into a number of neighbouring localities. The land use in the locality is predominantly grazing on native vegetation.

== History ==
Named after the Andromache River which first appears on a survey map of a route for a telegraph line from Bowen to Mackay drawn in late 1864 by surveyor and entrepreneur T.H. Fitzgerald. It is possible he gave the name. Andromache was the wife of the legendary Greek hero, Hector.

Andromache Provisional School opened circa 1891 and closed circa 1893.

Andromache River Prosivional School opened in 1927 and closed in 1928.

In 1923, a large steel-and-concrete railway bridge was erected over the Andromache River as part of the construction of the North Coast railway line. It is on the boundary of three adjacent localities (Andromache, Bloomsbury, and Thoopara).

== Demographics ==
In the 2016 census, Andromache had a population of 51 people.

In the 2021 census, Andromache had a population of 17 people.

== Education ==
There are no schools in Andromache. The nearest government primary schools are Proserpine State School in Proserpine to the north-east and Bloomsbury State School in neighbouring Bloomsbury to the south-east. The nearest government secondary schools are Proserpine State High School in Proserpine and Calen District State College in Calen to the south-east. There is also a Catholic primary-and-secondary school in Proserpine.
