= Thoopara, Queensland =

Thoopara
- Suburb
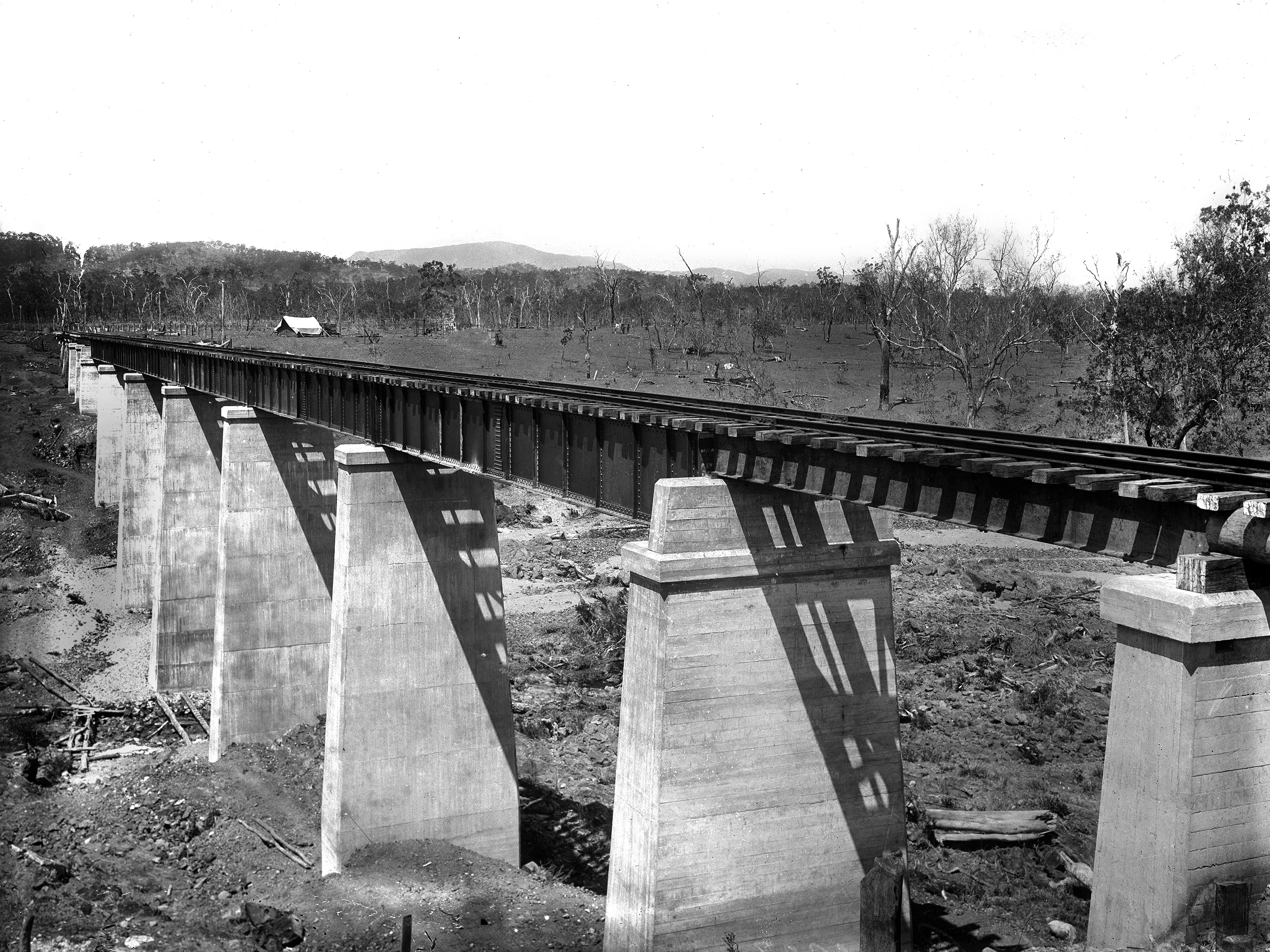
- Andromache River railway bridge, 1923

- Interactive map of Thoopara
- Coordinates: 20.5527°S 148.5747°E
- Country: Australia
- State: Queensland
- LGA: Whitsunday Region
- Location: 22.3 km (13.9 mi) SSW of Proserpine; 126 km (78 mi) NNW of Mackay; 296 km (184 mi) SE of Townsville; 1,088 km (676 mi) NNW of Brisbane

Government
  - State electorate: Whitsunday
  - Federal division: Dawson

Area
  - Total: 98.6 km^{2} (38.1 sq mi)

Population
  - Total: 52 (2021 census)
  - Density: 0.527/km^{2} (1.366/sq mi)
- Time zone: UTC+10:00 (AEST)
- Postcode: 4800
Suburbs around Thoopara
Goorganga Creek	Gunyarra	Goorganga Plains
Goorganga Creek	Thoopara	Lethebrook
Andromache	Andromache	Bloomsbury

Thoopara is a rural locality in the Whitsunday Region, Queensland, Australia. In the 2021 census, Thoopara had a population of 52 people.

== Geography ==
The Andromache River forms the southern boundary of Thoopara as it flows east to join the O'Connell River, which then forms the south-eastern boundary. The Bruce Highway crosses the O'Connell River at the Thoopara / Lethebrook / Bloomsbury tripoint and runs north to form the eastern boundary.

The North Coast railway line enters the locality from the south (Andromache / Bloomsbury) and exits to the north (Goorganga Creek / Gunyarra). Thoopara railway station (20.5511°S 148.5589°E) serves the locatlity and is the location of a passing loop.

The land use is predominantly grazing on native vegetation with some crop growing (mostly sugarcane). There is a cane tramway network to transport the harvested sugarcane to the local sugar mill.

== History ==
In 1923, a large steel-and-concrete railway bridge was erected over the Andromache River as part of the construction of the North Coast railway line. It is on the boundary of three adjacent localities (Andromache, Bloomsbury, and Thoopara).

== Demographics ==
In the 2016 census, Thoopara had a population of 39 people.

In the 2021 census, Thoopara had a population of 52 people.

== Education ==
There are no schools in Thoopara. The nearest government primary schools are Proserpine State School in Proserpine to the north and Bloomsbury State School in neighbouring Bloomsbury to the south-west. The nearest government secondary school is Proserpine State High School, also in Proserpine.
