= Woodwark, Queensland =

Woodwark
- Suburb
- Interactive map of Woodwark
- Coordinates: 20.2494°S 148.6508°E
- Country: Australia
- State: Queensland
- LGA: Whitsunday Region
- Location: 21.5 km (13.4 mi) NE of Proserpine; 146 km (91 mi) NNW of Mackay; 270 km (170 mi) SE of Townsville; 1,118 km (695 mi) NNW of Brisbane

Government
  - State electorate: Whitsunday
  - Federal division: Dawson

Area
  - Total: 35.4 km^{2} (13.7 sq mi)

Population
  - Total: 559 (2021 census)
  - Density: 15.79/km^{2} (40.90/sq mi)
- Time zone: UTC+10:00 (AEST)
- Postcode: 4802
Suburbs around Woodwark
Coral Sea	Coral Sea	Coral Sea
Cape Gloucester	Woodwark	Coral Sea
Gregory River	Riordanvale	Cannonvale; Cannon Valley

Woodwark is a coastal locality in the Whitsunday Region, Queensland, Australia. In the 2021 census, Woodwark had a population of 559 people.

== Geography ==
The waters of the Coral Sea form the northern boundary, part of the western, and most of the eastern. There are three peninsula extending into the Coral Sea, with the following coastal features (clockwise):

- the western half of Double Bay (20.2004°S 148.61959°E)
- Datum Rock (20.1902°S 148.6276°E)
- Woodwark Bay (20.1911°S 148.6578°E)
- Grimstone Point (20.1786°S 148.6761°E)
- Bluff Point (20.2317°S 148.6806°E)
- Pioneer Bay (20.24556°S 148.71083°E)

The terrain is mountainous, varying from sea level to 450 metres (1,480 ft) above sea level, but there are no named peaks.

The three peninsulas and the south-west of the locality are four sections of Dryander National Park. Apart from the protected areas, most of the land in the north, west, and centre of the locality is unused. The land use is primarily in the south-eastern part of the locality being residential with smaller suburban-sized blocks along the coast and larger rural residential blocks inland. In the south-east, there is some agriculture, a mix of horticulture and grazing on native vegetation.

The coastal waters off Woodwark are part of the Great Barrier Reef Marine Park (Whitsunday Islands section), but are available for "general use" such as recreational boating, fishing, and diving.

== History ==
The locality is named after Woodwark Bay, which was in turn named after George Smith Woodwark (mayor of King's Lynn) in 1886 by Lieutenant G.E. Richards of HMQS Paluma. It is believed that the name was suggested by Lieutenant Alexander Leeper of Paluma as his family lived in King's Lynn.

== Demographics ==
In the 2016 census, Woodwark had a population of 374 people.

In the 2021 census, Woodwark had a population of 559 people.

== Education ==
There are no schools in Woodwark. The nearest government primary school is Cannonvale State School in neighbouring Cannonvale to the south-east. The nearest government secondary school is Proserpine State High School in Proserpine to the south-west.
