= Riordanvale, Queensland =

Riordanvale
- Suburb
- Interactive map of Riordanvale
- Coordinates: 20.2830°S 148.6433°E
- Country: Australia
- State: Queensland
- LGA: Whitsunday Region
- Location: 9.8 km (6.1 mi) W of Cannonvale; 21.3 km (13.2 mi) NE of Proserpine; 146 km (91 mi) NNW of Mackay; 268 km (167 mi) SE of Townsville; 1,109 km (689 mi) NNW of Brisbane

Government
  - State electorate: Whitsunday
  - Federal division: Dawson

Area
  - Total: 12.0 km^{2} (4.6 sq mi)

Population
  - Total: 386 (2021 census)
  - Density: 32.17/km^{2} (83.3/sq mi)
- Time zone: UTC+10:00 (AEST)
- Postcode: 4800
Suburbs around Riordanvale
Woodwark	Woodwark	Woodwark
Gregory River	Riordanvale	Woodwark
Sugarloaf	Cannon Valley	Cannon Valley

Riordanvale is a rural locality in the Whitsunday Region, Queensland, Australia. In the 2021 census, Riordanvale had a population of 386 people.

== Geography ==
Dryander National Park occupies the north-west corner of the locality extending into neighbouring Gregory River to the west and neighbouring Woodwark to the north.

The land use is a mix of rural residential, grazing on native vegetation, and growing sugarcane.

== History ==
Riordan Vale Provisional School opened on 22 May 1939. The first head teacher was Vincent John Goodman. The school had a temporary closure but its reopening was announced in December 1953. It became Riordan Vale State School in 1955. It closed in 1963. It was at 333 Riordanvale Road (20.2905°S 148.6463°E).

== Demographics ==
In the 2016 census, Riordanvale had a population of 312 people.

In the 2021 census, Riordanvale had a population of 386 people.

== Education ==
There are no schools in Riordanvale. The nearest government primary school is Cannonvale State School in Cannonvale to the east. The nearest government secondary school is Proserpine State High School in Proserpine to the south-west.
