= Lethebrook, Queensland =

Lethebrook
- Suburb
- Interactive map of Lethebrook
- Coordinates: 20.5394°S 148.6474°E
- Country: Australia
- State: Queensland
- LGA: Whitsunday Region
- Location: 19.2 km (11.9 mi) SSE of Proserpine; 111 km (69 mi) NNW of Mackay; 283 km (176 mi) SW of Townsville; 1,071 km (665 mi) NNW of Brisbane

Government
  - State electorate: Whitsunday
  - Federal division: Dawson

Area
  - Total: 18.4 km^{2} (7.1 sq mi)

Population
  - Total: 51 (2021 census)
  - Density: 2.77/km^{2} (7.18/sq mi)
- Time zone: UTC+10:00 (AEST)
- Postcode: 4800
Suburbs around Lethebrook
Thoopara	Goorganga Plains	Goorganga Plains
Thoopara	Lethebrook	Goorganga Plains
Bloomsbury	Bloomsbury	Coral Sea

Lethebrook is a coastal rural locality in the Whitsunday Region, Queensland, Australia. In the 2021 census, Lethebrook had a population of 51 people.

== Geography ==
The locality is bounded by the Coral Sea to the east, the O'Connell River to the south, the Bruce Highway to the west, and Thompson Creek to the north, which flows into the Coral Sea.

The land use is predominantly growing sugarcane with some grazing on native vegetation. There are cane tramways to transport harvested sugarcane to local sugar mills.

== History ==
The district was originally known as Banana Pocket until 1924 when it was renamed Lethebrook. The name Lethe Brook presumably refers to the nearby creek Lethe Brook, a tributary of the Proserpine River, although it does not flow through the locality.

Banana Pocket Provisional School opened on 25 May 1922 with 10 students from three families under teacher Miss Phyllis Lena Dawson. In 1926, it became Banana Pocket State School. In 1949, it was renamed Lethebrook State School. It closed on 15 June 1964. It was at 7 Walsh Road (20.53814°S 148.65007°E).

== Demographics ==
In the 2016 census, Lethebrook had a population of 51 people.

In the 2021 census, Lethebrook had a population of 51 people.

== Education ==
There are no schools in Lethebrook. The nearest government primary schools are Proserpine State School in Proserpine to the north-west and Bloomsbury State School in neighbouring Bloomsbury to the south-west. The nearest government secondary school is Proserpine State High School, also in Proserpine. There is also a Catholic primary and secondary school in Proserpine.
