= Preston, Queensland (Whitsunday Region) =

Preston
- Suburb
- Interactive map of Preston
- Coordinates: 20.3869°S 148.6569°E
- Country: Australia
- State: Queensland
- LGA: Whitsunday Region
- Location: 12.4 km (7.7 mi) E of Proserpine; 137 km (85 mi) N of Mackay; 271 km (168 mi) SE of Townsville; 1,113 km (692 mi) NNW of Brisbane

Government
  - State electorate: Whitsunday
  - Federal division: Dawson

Area
  - Total: 42.7 km^{2} (16.5 sq mi)

Population
  - Total: 346 (2021 census)
  - Density: 8.103/km^{2} (20.99/sq mi)
- Time zone: UTC+10:00 (AEST)
- Postcode: 4800
Suburbs around Preston
Mount Marlow	Cape Conway	Cape Conway
Mount Julian	Preston	Palm Grove
Glen Isla	Goorganga Plains	Conway

Preston is a rural locality in the Whitsunday Region, Queensland, Australia. In the 2021 census, Preston had a population of 346 people.

The town of Bonavista is within the south of the locality (20.382°S 148.651°E).

== Geography ==
The locality is bounded to the west and south by the Proserpine River.

The main road route through the locality is Conway Road which enters the locality from the north-west (Mount Julian / Mount Marlow), passes through the town of Bonavista, and then exits to the south-east (Conway / Palm Grove).

The elevation ranges from 10 to 270 metres (33 to 886 ft). The lower-lying land is mostly in the west of the locality and is used for growing sugarcane. There is a cane tramway to transport the harvested sugarcane to the local sugar mill. The higher land are mostly used for grazing on native vegetation.

== History ==
The town of Bonavista was originally called Conway, which was derived from Cape Conway, which was named on 3 June 1770 by Lieutenant James Cook, commander of HMS Endeavour, after British Secretary of State for the Southern Department, Henry Seymour Conway. The town was renamed Bonavista from 3 January 1961. However, the road to the town is still called Conway Road.

== Demographics ==
In the 2016 census, Preston had a population of 296 people.

In the 2021 census, Preston had a population of 346 people.

== Education ==
There are no schools in Preston. The nearest government primary schools are Proserpine State School in Proserpine to the west and Cannonvale State School in Cannonvale to the north-east. The nearest government secondary school is Proserpine State High School, also in Proserpine.
