= Conway, Queensland =

Conway
- Suburb
- Interactive map of Conway
- Coordinates: 20.4577°S 148.7141°E
- Country: Australia
- State: Queensland
- LGA: Whitsunday Region
- Location: 25.6 km (15.9 mi) SE of Proserpine; 150 km (93 mi) NW of Mackay; 284 km (176 mi) SE of Townsville; 1,126 km (700 mi) NNW of Brisbane

Government
  - State electorate: Whitsunday
  - Federal division: Dawson

Area
  - Total: 18.0 km^{2} (6.9 sq mi)

Population
  - Total: 202 (2021 census)
  - Density: 11.22/km^{2} (29.07/sq mi)
- Time zone: UTC+10:00 (AEST)
- Postcode: 4800
Suburbs around Conway
Preston	Palm Grove	Cape Conway
Goorganga Plains	Conway	Cape Conway
Goorganga Plains	Wilson Beach	Conway Beach

Conway is a locality in the Whitsunday Region, Queensland, Australia. In the 2021 census, Conway had a population of 202 people.

== Geography ==
Conway is bounded on the north-west by Serpentine Creek and to the west and south-west by the Proserpine River. Conway Road runs along the western part of the locality which is lower flatter land; the residential and farming land is in that area. The eastern part of the locality is more mountainous and undeveloped.

== History ==
The locality name derives from Cape Conway, which was named on 3 June 1770 by Lieutenant James Cook on the HM Bark Endeavour after Henry Seymour Conway, the Secretary of State for the Southern Department from 1765 to 1766 and Northern Department from 1766 to 1768.

== Demographics ==
In the 2016 census, Conway had a population of 194 people.

In the 2021 census, Conway had a population of 202 people.

== Education ==
There are no schools in Conway. The nearest government primary and secondary schools are Proserpine State School and Proserpine State High School, both in Proserpine to the north-west.

== Amenities ==
There is a boat ramp and floating walkway at Conway Road into the Prosperine River (20.4519°S 148.6994°E). It is managed by the Whitsunday Regional Council.
