= Goorganga Plains, Queensland =

Goorganga Plains
- Suburb
- Interactive map of Goorganga Plains
- Coordinates: 20.4844°S 148.6544°E
- Country: Australia
- State: Queensland
- LGA: Whitsunday Region
- Location: 9.4 km (5.8 mi) S of Proserpine; 116 km (72 mi) NW of Mackay; 271 km (168 mi) SE of Townsville; 1,080 km (670 mi) NNW of Brisbane

Government
  - State electorate: Whitsunday
  - Federal division: Dawson

Area
  - Total: 106.7 km^{2} (41.2 sq mi)

Population
  - Total: 0 (2021 census)
  - Density: 0.000/km^{2} (0.000/sq mi)
- Postcode: 4800
Suburbs around Goorganga Plains
Breadalbane	Glen Isla; Preston	Conway
Gunyarra; Kelsey Creek	Goorganga Plains	Wilson Beach
Thoopara	Lethebrook	Coral Sea

Goorganga Plains is a coastal locality in the Whitsunday Region, Queensland, Australia. In the 2021 census, Goorganga Plains had "no people or a very low population".

== Geography ==
The Proserpine River forms most of the northern boundary, while the Coral Sea forms the eastern. Thompson Creek forms the southern boundary.

The Bruce Highway follows the south-western boundary before passing through the north-west corner.

== Demographics ==
In the 2016 census, Goorganga Plains had "no people or a very low population".

In the 2021 census, Goorganga Plains had "no people or a very low population".

== Education ==
There are no schools in Goorganga Plains. The nearest government primary and secondary schools are Proserpine State School and Proserpine State High School, both in Proserpine to the north-west.
