= Wilson Beach, Queensland =

Wilson Beach
- Suburb
- Interactive map of Wilson Beach
- Coordinates: 20.4705°S 148.7236°E
- Country: Australia
- State: Queensland
- LGA: Whitsunday Region
- Location: 27.3 km (17.0 mi) SE of Proserpine; 152 km (94 mi) NNW of Mackay; 286 km (178 mi) SE of Townsville; 1,128 km (701 mi) NNW of Brisbane

Government
  - State electorate: Whitsunday
  - Federal division: Dawson

Area
  - Total: 3.3 km^{2} (1.3 sq mi)

Population
  - Total: 68 (2021 census)
  - Density: 20.6/km^{2} (53.4/sq mi)
- Time zone: UTC+10:00 (AEST)
- Postcode: 4800
Suburbs around Wilson Beach
Conway	Conway	Conway
Goorganga Plains	Wilson Beach	Conway Beach
Goorganga Plains	Coral Sea	Coral Sea

Wilson Beach is a coastal locality in the Whitsunday Region, Queensland, Australia. In the 2021 census, Wilson Beach had a population of 68 people.

== Geography ==
The estuary of the Proserpine River, where it enters the Coral Sea, forms the southern boundary.

== Demographics ==
In the 2016 census, Wilson Beach had a population of 59 people.

In the 2021 census, Wilson Beach had a population of 68 people.

== Education ==
There are no schools in Wilson Beach. The nearest government primary and secondary schools are Proserpine State School and Proserpine State High School, both in Proserpine to the north-west.
