= Glen Isla, Queensland =

Glen Isla
- Suburb
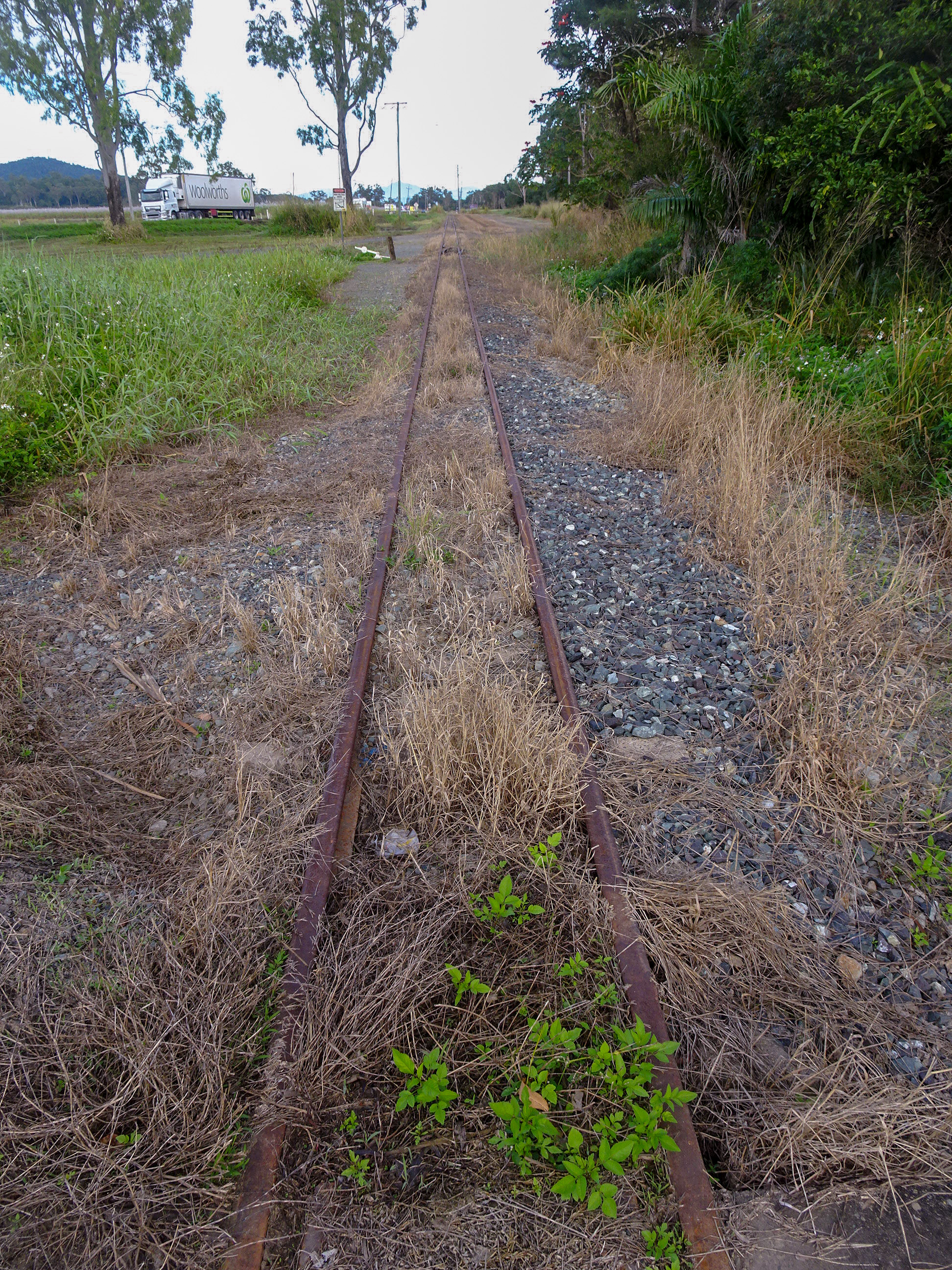
- Cane tramway, Glen Isla, 2024

- Interactive map of Glen Isla
- Coordinates: 20.4063°S 148.6175°E
- Country: Australia
- State: Queensland
- LGA: Whitsunday Region
- Location: 2.9 km (1.8 mi) E of Proserpine; 126 km (78 mi) NNW of Mackay; 292 km (181 mi) SE of Townsville; 1,099 km (683 mi) NNW of Brisbane

Government
  - State electorate: Whitsunday
  - Federal division: Dawson

Area
  - Total: 27.0 km^{2} (10.4 sq mi)

Population
  - Total: 43 (2021 census)
  - Density: 1.593/km^{2} (4.12/sq mi)
- Time zone: UTC+10:00 (AEST)
- Postcode: 4800
Suburbs around Glen Isla
Hamilton Plains	Mount Julian	Preston
Proserpine	Glen Isla	Preston
Breadalbane	Breadalbane	Goorganga Plains

Glen Isla is a rural locality in the Whitsunday Region, Queensland, Australia. In the 2021 census, Glen Isla had a population of 43 people.

== Geography ==
The locality is bounded to the north-west, north, north-east, east, and south-east by the Proserpine River. The Bruce Highway forms part of the south-western boundary.

The land use is crop growing in the west of the locality (predominantly sugarcane) and grazing on native vegetation in the east of the locality. There is a cane tramway network to transport the harvested sugarcane to the Proserpine sugar mill.

== History ==
Glen Isla was a sugarcane plantation operated by the Crystal Brook Sugar Company, which was registered in 1882, the first in the district. It consisted of 3,000 acres (1,200 ha). The plantation used South Sea Islander and Chinese workers and operated a small sugar mill on the banks of the Proserpine River. A drop in sugar prices caused the company to collapse in 1885.

== Demographics ==
In the 2016 census, Glen Isla had a population of 29 people.

In the 2021 census, Glen Isla had a population of 43 people.

== Education ==
There are no schools in Glen Isla. The nearest government primary and secondary schools are Proserpine State School and Proserpine State High School, both in neighbouring Proserpine to the west. There is also a Catholic primary and secondary school in Proserpine.
