= Sugarloaf, Queensland (Whitsunday Region) =

Sugarloaf
- Suburb
- Interactive map of Sugarloaf
- Coordinates: 20.3125°S 148.6322°E
- Country: Australia
- State: Queensland
- LGA: Whitsunday Region
- Location: 14.9 km (9.3 mi) NE of Proserpine; 140 km (87 mi) NNW of Mackay; 266 km (165 mi) SE of Townsville; 1,101 km (684 mi) NNW of Brisbane

Government
  - State electorate: Whitsunday
  - Federal division: Dawson

Area
  - Total: 6.7 km^{2} (2.6 sq mi)

Population
  - Total: 310 (2021 census)
  - Density: 46.3/km^{2} (119.8/sq mi)
- Time zone: UTC+10:00 (AEST)
- Postcode: 4800
Suburbs around Sugarloaf
Gregory River	Riordanvale	Cannon Valley
Strathdickie	Sugarloaf	Cannon Valley
Strathdickie	Cannon Valley	Cannon Valley

Sugarloaf is a rural locality in the Whitsunday Region, Queensland, Australia. In the 2021 census, Sugarloaf had a population of 310 people.

== Demographics ==
In the 2016 census, Sugarloaf had a population of 278 people.

In the 2021 census, Sugarloaf had a population of 310 people.

== Education ==
There are no schools in Sugarloaf. The nearest government primary school is Cannonvale State School in Cannonvale to the north-east. The nearest government secondary school is Proserpine State High School in Proserpine to the south-west.
