= Pauls Pocket, Queensland =

Pauls Pocket
- Suburb
- Interactive map of Pauls Pocket
- Coordinates: 20.4738°S 148.4122°E
- Country: Australia
- State: Queensland
- LGA: Whitsunday Region
- Location: 21.5 km (13.4 mi) SW of Proserpine; 147 km (91 mi) NW of Mackay; 286 km (178 mi) SE of Townsville; 1,108 km (688 mi) NNW of Brisbane

Government
  - State electorate: Whitsunday
  - Federal division: Dawson

Area
  - Total: 27.6 km^{2} (10.7 sq mi)

Population
  - Total: 38 (2021 census)
  - Density: 1.377/km^{2} (3.57/sq mi)
- Time zone: UTC+10:00 (AEST)
- Postcode: 4800
Suburbs around Pauls Pocket
Lake Proserpine	Dittmer	Kelsey Creek
Andromache	Pauls Pocket	Silver Creek
Andromache	Andromache	Goorganga Creek

Pauls Pocket is a rural locality in the Whitsunday Region, Queensland, Australia. In the 2021 census, Pauls Pocket had a population of 38 people.

== Geography ==
Mount Quandong is in the south-west of the locality (20.4903°S 148.3941°E), rising to 780 metres (2,560 ft) above sea level.

The Proserpine State Forest occupies most of the north and west of the locality. Apart from this area, the land use is predominantly grazing on native vegetation with some rural residential housing.

== Demographics ==
In the 2016 census, Pauls Pocket had a population of 42 people.

In the 2021 census, Pauls Pocket had a population of 38 people.

== Education ==
There are no schools in Pauls Pocket. The nearest government primary and secondary schools are Proserpine State School and Proserpine State High School, both in Proserpine to the north-east. There is also a primary-and-secondary Catholic school in Proserpine.
