= Dittmer, Queensland =

Dittmer
- Town
- Interactive map of Dittmer
- Coordinates: 20.4512°S 148.4021°E
- Country: Australia
- State: Queensland
- LGA: Whitsunday Region
- Location: 19.4 km (12.1 mi) W of Proserpine; 146 km (91 mi) NNW of Mackay; 281 km (175 mi) SE of Townsville; 1,091 km (678 mi) NNW of Brisbane

Government
  - State electorate: Whitsunday
  - Federal division: Dawson

Area
  - Total: 27.7 km^{2} (10.7 sq mi)

Population
  - Total: 52 (2021 census)
  - Density: 1.877/km^{2} (4.86/sq mi)
- Time zone: UTC+10:00 (AEST)
- Postcode: 4800
Localities around Dittmer
Lake Proserpine	Crystal Brook	Crystal Brook
Lake Proserpine	Dittmer	Kelsey Creek
Lake Proserpine	Pauls Pocket	Kelsey Creek

Dittmer is a rural town and locality in the Whitsunday Region, Queensland, Australia. In the 2021 census, the locality of Dittmer had a population of 52 people.

== History ==
The locality is named after Felix Dittmer, who bought a gold mine in the area. A town grew up around the mine, but after its liquidation in 1952 it became a ghost town.

Dittmer State School opened circa 1938 and closed circa 1952. It was at approx 11 Thorogood Street (20.4504°S 148.4031°E).

== Demographics ==
In the 2016 census, the locality of Dittmer had a population of 79 people.

In the 2021 census, the locality of Dittmer had a population of 52 people.

== Education ==
There are no schools in Dittmer. The nearest government primary and secondary schools are Proserpine State School and Proserpine State High School respectively, both in Proserpine to the north-east.
