= Laguna Quays, Queensland =

Laguna Quays
- Suburb
- Interactive map of Laguna Quays
- Coordinates: 20.6225°S 148.6658°E
- Country: Australia
- State: Queensland
- LGA: Mackay Region
- Location: 28.5 km (17.7 mi) SSE of Proserpine; 110 km (68 mi) NW of Mackay CBD; 290 km (180 mi) SE of Townsville; 1,079 km (670 mi) NNW of Brisbane

Government
  - State electorate: Whitsunday
  - Federal division: Dawson

Area
  - Total: 20.7 km^{2} (8.0 sq mi)

Population
  - Total: 89 (2021 census)
  - Density: 4.30/km^{2} (11.14/sq mi)
- Time zone: UTC+10:00 (AEST)
- Postcode: 4800
Suburbs around Laguna Quays
Bloomsbury	Bloomsbury	Coral Sea
Bloomsbury	Laguna Quays	Midge Point
Bloomsbury	Bloomsbury	Midge Point

Laguna Quays is a coastal locality in the Mackay Region, Queensland, Australia. In the 2021 census, Laguna Quays had a population of 89 people.

== Geography ==
The Coral Sea forms the eastern boundary of the locality. Covering Beach is on the north-east coast (20.5973°S 148.6734°E).

The northern part of the locality is used for the Laguna Quays Resort, some housing and the currently-closed Turtle Point Golf Course. Grazing is the predominant land use in the north-west and south-west of the locality. The rest of the locality is undeveloped land.

== History ==
In 1992, the Laguna Quays resort opened as a luxury resort. It had cost $250 million. A 70-berth marina opened in 1993. However, in 1995, the resort went bankrupt owing around $200 million. By 2009, the Mackay Regional Council was owed over $2 million for rates. It auctioned parts of the precinct to attempt to recover the money. In 2013, Fullshare Holdings Group bought the resort announcing in 2015 they would refurbish and upgrade the facilities and dredge the marina.

The locality of Laguna Quays was officially named and bounded in September 1999.

On 27 July 2022, a 2-to-2.5-metre (6 ft 7 in to 8 ft 2 in) long crocodile was trapped and relocated after it was seen in a pond on the Turtle Bay golf course. Although the area is within the normal habitat range for crocodiles, its size and its proximity to people warranted its removal, noting that golf course ponds are attractive to crocodiles as a place of refuge, a source of food, and freshwater.

In 2023, the resort had not been redeveloped or reopene, so people with privately-owned land parcels in Laguna Quays formed the Laguna Quay Progress Association to repair and beautify their residential areas to stimulate sales of other blocks of land to form a thriving community.

== Demographics ==
In the 2016 census, Laguna Quays had a population of 68 people.

In the 2021 census, Laguna Quays had a population of 89 people.

== Education ==
There are no schools in Laguna Quays. The nearest government primary school is Bloomsbury State School in neighbouring Bloomsbury to the south-west. The nearest government secondary school is Proserpine State High School in Proserpine to the north. There is also a Catholic primary-and-secondary school in Proserpine.

== Amenities ==
Laguna Quays Marina is a 9.3-hectare (23-acre) marina (20.6046°S 148.6811°E). There is a boat ramp (20.6036°S 148.6797°E) at the marina.
