= Gunyarra =

- Suburb
- Interactive map of Gunyarra
- Coordinates: 20.4980°S 148.5794°E
- Country: Australia
- State: Queensland
- LGA: Whitsunday Region
- Location: 11.6 km (7.2 mi) S of Proserpine; 115 km (71 mi) NNW of Mackay; 272 km (169 mi) SE of Townsville; 1,065 km (662 mi) NNW of Brisbane

Government
  - State electorate: Whitsunday
  - Federal division: Dawson

Area
  - Total: 27.7 km^{2} (10.7 sq mi)

Population
  - Total: 30 (2021 census)
  - Density: 1.08/km^{2} (2.8/sq mi)
- Time zone: UTC+10:00 (AEST)
- Postcode: 4800
Suburbs around Gunyarra
Kelsey Creek	Kelsey Creek	Goorganga Plains
Silver Creek	Gunyarra	Goorganga Plains
Goorganga Creek	Goorganga Creek	Thoopara

Gunyarra is a rural locality in the Whitsunday Region, Queensland, Australia. In the 2021 census, Gunyarra had a population of 30 people.

== Geography ==
The locality is bounded by the Bruce Highway to the east.

The North Coast railway line enters from the south-east (Thoopara) and exits to the north (Kelsey Creek / Goorganga Creek). Gunyarra railway station is an abandoned railway station in the south of the locality on the railway line (20.5096°S 148.5671°E).

The Whitsunday Coast Airport (formerly Proserpine Airport) is in the south of the locality, west of the railway line (20.4869°S 148.5562°E).

The land in the east of the locality is used for irrigated cropping, mostly sugarcane. A cane tramway network passes through the south-east of the locality to deliver harvested sugarcane to the Prosperine sugar mill in Proserpine to the north.

The west of the locality is predominantly used for grazing on native vegetation.

== History ==
The locality takes its name from the railway station which is believed to be an Aboriginal word meaning crocodile.

== Demographics ==
In the 2016 census, Gunyarra had a population of 16 people.

In the 2021 census, Gunyarra had a population of 30 people.

== Education ==
There are no schools in Gunyarra. The nearest government primary school is Proserpine State School in Proserpine to the north. The nearest government secondary school is Proserpine State High School in Proserpine.

== Amenities ==
On Lascelles Road in the north-east of the locality are race tracks (20.4832°S 148.5829°E) used by the Whitsunday Dirt Riders Club and the Whitsunday Sporting Car Club.
