= Cannon Valley, Queensland =

Cannon Valley
- Suburb
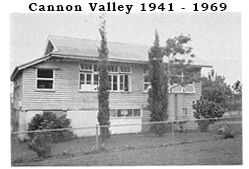
- Cannon Valley State School, 1969

- Interactive map of Cannon Valley
- Coordinates: 20.3158°S 148.6511°E
- Country: Australia
- State: Queensland
- LGA: Whitsunday Region
- Location: 5.44 km (3.38 mi) SW of Cannonvale; 16.7 km (10.4 mi) NW of Proserpine; 265 km (165 mi) SW of Townsville; 1,117 km (694 mi) NNW of Brisbane

Government
  - State electorate: Whitsunday
  - Federal division: Dawson

Area
  - Total: 16.8 km^{2} (6.5 sq mi)

Population
  - Total: 1,131 (2021 census)
  - Density: 67.32/km^{2} (174.4/sq mi)
- Time zone: UTC+10:00 (AEST)
- Postcode: 4800
Suburbs around Cannon Valley
Riordanvale	Woodwark	Cannonvale
Sugarloaf	Cannon Valley	Cape Conway
Strathdickie	Mount Marlow	Brandy Creek

Cannon Valley is a semi-rural locality in the Whitsunday Region, Queensland, Australia. In the 2021 census, Cannon Valley had a population of 1,131 people.

== Geography ==
The Proserpine-Shute Harbour Road (State Route 59) runs through from south (Proserpine) to north (Cannonvale).

Extending south from Cannonvale, the locality east of the road is increasingly being developed as residential housing, both as suburban lots and larger rural residential lots. The land use to the west of the road remains mostly grazing on native vegetation.

== History ==
George Strong Nares (Royal Navy), the commander of HMS Salamander, named the area Cannon Valley, after Richard Cannon, the assistant surgeon on the ship. When town lots were sold in the coastal area 1904, the town name used was Cannonvale (which is now the neighbouring locality).

Cannon Valley State School opened in 1910 in Cannon Valley. In 1968, it was decided to relocate the school into Cannonvale as the majority of the students were coming from Cannonvale. The new school buildings in Cannonvale opened in July 1969 with 84 students and the school was then renamed Cannonvale State School. Cannon Valley State School was at 1-11 Abell Road (north-east corner of Shute Harbour, 20.2890°S 148.6784°E). Although the school's original location was outside of Cannonvale in 1969, that location is now within the present-day boundary of Cannonvale due to the growth of Cannonvale.

Windermere State School opened on 21 March 1922. It consisted of one room 21 by 14 feet (6.4 by 4.3 m) with an awning 27 by 9 feet (8.2 by 2.7 m). In 1936, a new school building was erected with the old building sold for removal. The school closed in 1942. In 1946, the school building was relocated to Proserpine State School to support the expansion of that school to offer secondary schooling. Windermere State School was on the south-eastern corner of Shute Harbour Road and Cannon Valley Road (20.3235°S 148.6539°E).

== Demographics ==
In the 2016 census, Cannon Valley had a population of 963 people.

In the 2021 census, Cannon Valley had a population of 1,131 people.

== Education ==
There are no schools in Cannon Valley. The nearest government primary schools are Cannonvale State School in neighbouring Cannonvale to the north-east and Proserpine State School in Proserpine to the south-west. The nearest government secondary school is Proserpine State High School, also in Proserpine.
