= Silver Creek, Queensland =

Silver Creek
- Suburb
- Interactive map of Silver Creek
- Coordinates: 20.4747°S 148.4766°E
- Country: Australia
- State: Queensland
- LGA: Whitsunday Region
- Location: 19.4 km (12.1 mi) SW of Proserpine; 145 km (90 mi) NW of Mackay; 282 km (175 mi) SE of Townsville; 1,115 km (693 mi) NNW of Brisbane

Government
  - State electorate: Whitsunday
  - Federal division: Dawson

Area
  - Total: 24.4 km^{2} (9.4 sq mi)

Population
  - Total: 18 (2021 census)
  - Density: 0.738/km^{2} (1.91/sq mi)
- Time zone: UTC+10:00 (AEST)
- Postcode: 4800
Suburbs around Silver Creek
Kelsey Creek	Kelsey Creek	Kelsey Creek
Pauls Pocket	Silver Creek	Gunyarra
Pauls Pocket	Goorganga Creek	Gunyarra

Silver Creek is a rural locality in the Whitsunday Region, Queensland, Australia. In the 2021 census, Silver Creek had a population of 18 people.

== Geography ==
Victoria Creek forms much of the southern boundary before joining Goorganga Creek, which then forms part of the same boundary.

The land use is a mixture of growing sugarcane and grazing on native vegetation. There is a cane tramway to transport the harvested sugarcane to the local sugar mill.

== Demographics ==
In the 2016 census, Silver Creek had a population of 8 people.

In the 2021 census, Silver Creek had a population of 18 people.

== Education ==
There are no schools in Silver Creek. The nearest government primary and secondary schools are Proserpine State School and Proserpine State High School, both in Proserpine to the north-east. There is also a Catholic primary-and-secondary school in Proserpine.
