= Kelsey Creek, Queensland =

Kelsey Creek
- Suburb
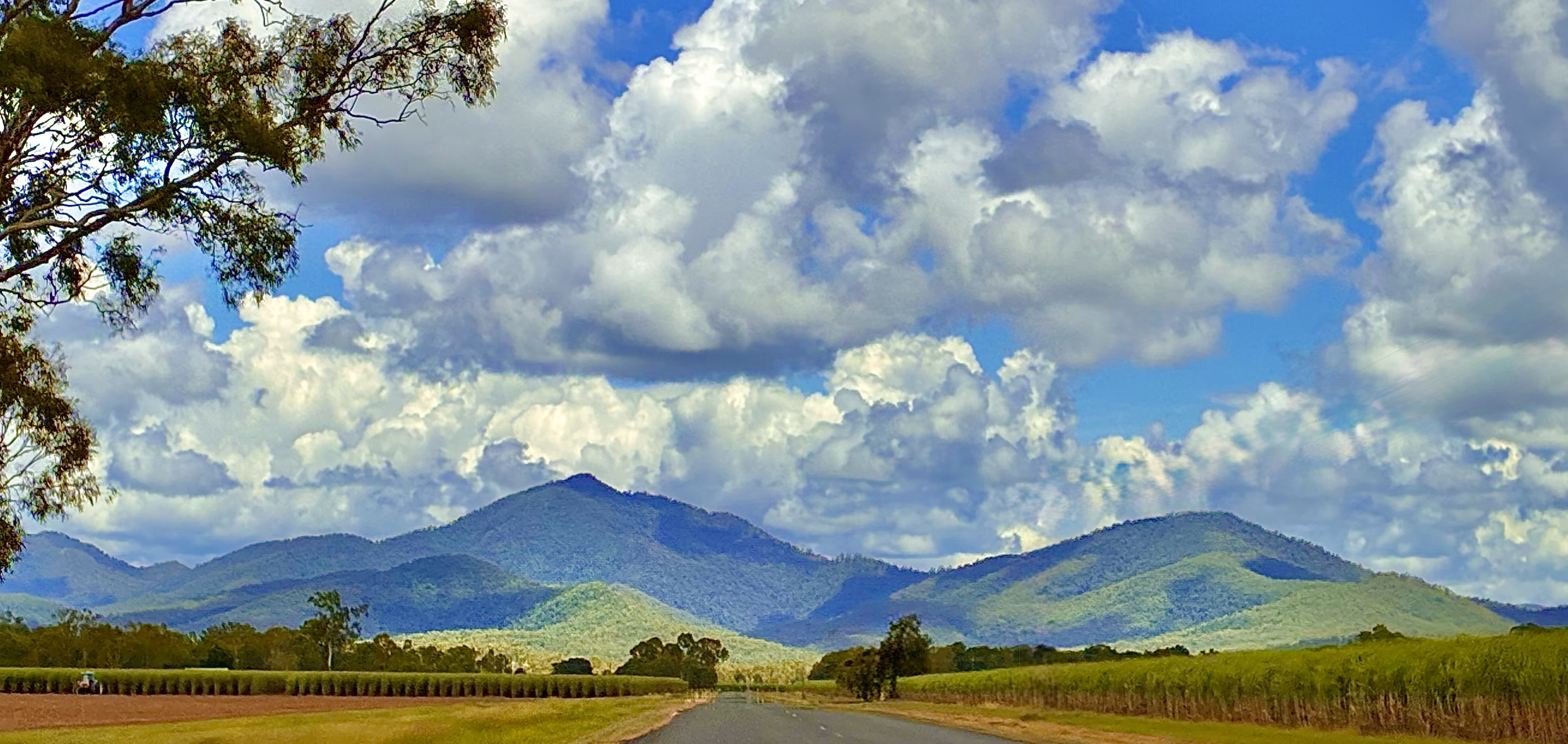
- Kelsey Creek, 2025

- Interactive map of Kelsey Creek
- Coordinates: 20.4380°S 148.5077°E
- Country: Australia
- State: Queensland
- LGA: Whitsunday Region
- Location: 13.9 km (8.6 mi) WSW of Proserpine; 140 km (87 mi) NW of Mackay; 275 km (171 mi) SE of Townsville; 1,183 km (735 mi) NNW of Brisbane

Government
  - State electorate: Whitsunday
  - Federal division: Dawson

Area
  - Total: 92.7 km^{2} (35.8 sq mi)

Population
  - Total: 157 (2021 census)
  - Density: 1.694/km^{2} (4.386/sq mi)
- Time zone: UTC+10:00 (AEST)
- Postcode: 4800
Suburbs around Kelsey Creek
Crystal Brook	Crystal Brook	Proserpine
Dittmer	Kelsey Creek	Breadalbane
Pauls Pocket	Silver Creek; Gunyarra	Goorganga Plains

Kelsey Creek is a semi-rural locality in the Whitsunday Region, Queensland, Australia. In the 2021 census, Kelsey Creek had a population of 157 people.

== Geography ==
The land use is predominantly crop growing (mainly sugarcane) in the north of the locality with grazing on native vegetation in the remainder of the locality. There is a cane tramway to transport the harvested sugarcane to the local sugar mill in Proserpine.

== History ==
Kelsey Creek Provisional School opened on 30 January 1895. On 1 January 1909, it became Kelsey Creek State School. It closed in 1963. It was at approx 21 Silver Creek Road (20.42787°S 148.47520°E).

In July 1915, the Bishop John Feetham opened St Luke's Anglican Church. The bishop returned in July 1933 to re-open the church following damage from a fire. It is no longer extant. It was north-east of the school at approx 21 Silver Creek Road (20.42728°S 148.47582°E).

The Kelsey Creek Hall opened on Saturday 30 April 1927. It was 40 by 20 feet (12.2 by 6.1 m) with a 10 feet (3.0 m) verandah and was built by J.P. Muller.

== Demographics ==
In the 2016 census, Kelsey Creek had a population of 123 people.

In the 2021 census, Kelsey Creek had a population of 157 people.

== Education ==
There are no schools in Kelsey Creek. The nearest government primary and secondary schools are Proserpine State School and Proserpine State High School, both in neighbouring Proserpine to the north-east. Catholic schooling is also available in Proserpine.

== Amenities ==
Kelsey Creek Hall is on Valmadre Road (20.42781°S 148.47715°E). It is listed on the Whitsunday Region Local Heritage Register.
