= Rangemore, Queensland =

Rangemore, Queensland may refer to:

- Rangemore, Queensland (Burdekin Shire)
- Rangemore, Queensland (Toowoomba Region)
