= Conway Beach, Queensland =

Conway Beach
- Suburb
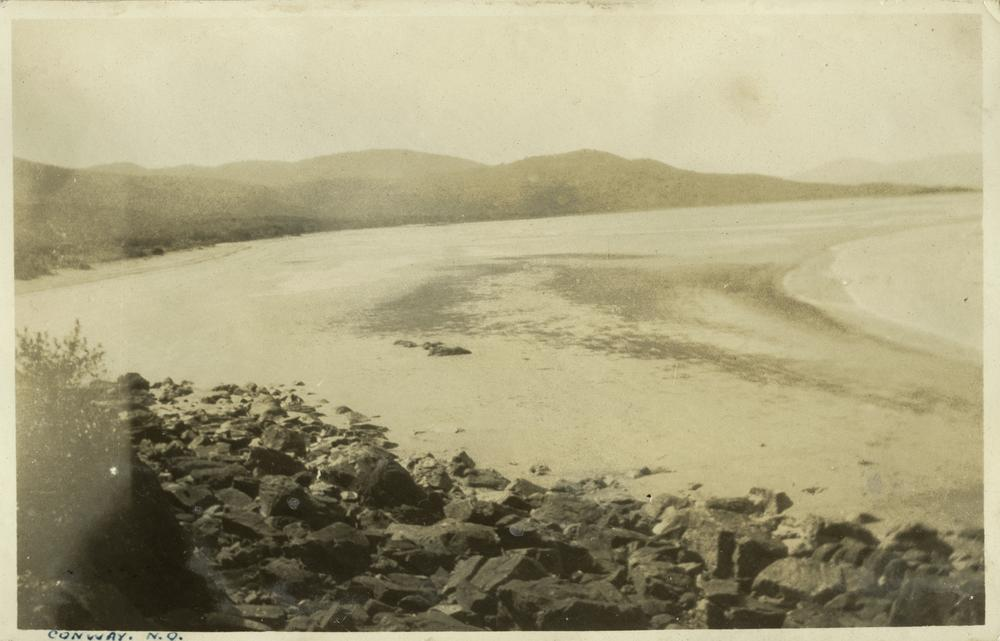
- View from the cliff at low tide, Conway Beach, 1937-1938

- Interactive map of Conway Beach
- Coordinates: 20.4747°S 148.7469°E
- Country: Australia
- State: Queensland
- LGA: Whitsunday Region
- Location: 27.8 km (17.3 mi) SE of Proserpine; 153 km (95 mi) NNW of Mackay; 287 km (178 mi) SE of Townsville; 1,128 km (701 mi) NNW of Brisbane

Government
  - State electorate: Whitsunday
  - Federal division: Dawson

Area
  - Total: 0.9 km^{2} (0.35 sq mi)

Population
  - Total: 75 (2021 census)
  - Density: 83/km^{2} (216/sq mi)
- Time zone: UTC+10:00 (AEST)
- Postcode: 4800
Suburbs around Conway Beach
Conway	Conway	Conway
Wilson Beach	Conway Beach	Conway
Repulse Bay	Repulse Bay	Cape Conway

Conway Beach is a coastal locality in the Whitsunday Region, Queensland, Australia. In the 2021 census, Conway Beach had a population of 75 people.

== Geography ==
The locality is bounded to the south by Repulse Bay of the Coral Sea.

== History ==
The locality takes its name from Cape Conway which was in turn named after politician Henry Seymour Conway on 3 June 1770 by Lieutenant James Cook, captain of HMS Endeavour.

== Demographics ==
In the 2016 census, Conway Beach had a population of 80 people.

In the 2021 census, Conway Beach had a population of 75 people.

== Education ==
There are no schools in Conway Beach. The nearest government primary and secondary schools are Proserpine State School and Proserpine State High School, both in Proserpine to the north-west.
