= Bloomsbury, Queensland =

Bloomsbury
- Town
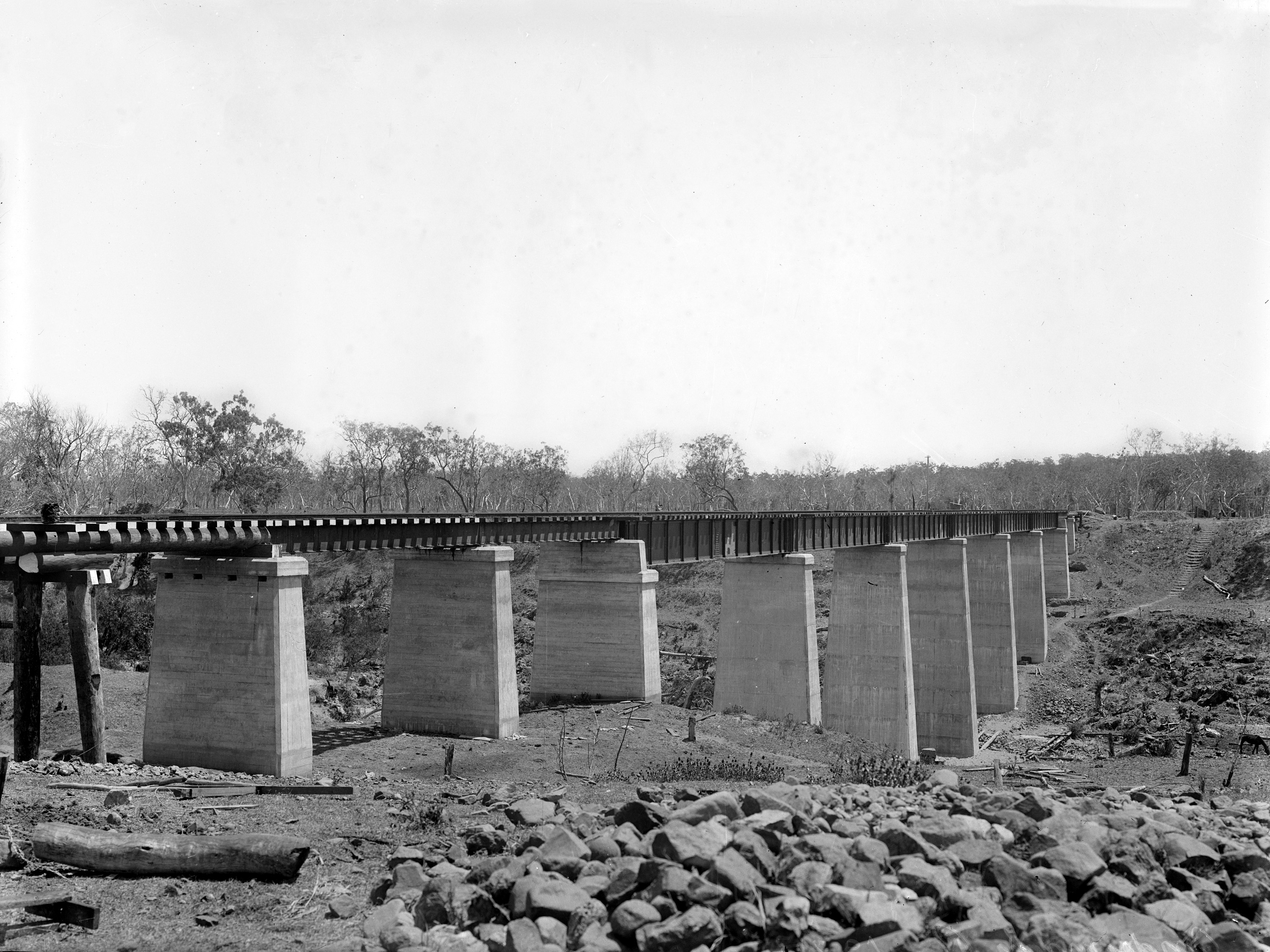
- Andromache River railway bridge, 1923

- Interactive map of Bloomsbury
- Coordinates: 20.7061°S 148.5947°E
- Country: Australia
- State: Queensland
- LGA: Mackay Region
- Location: 32.1 km (19.9 mi) NW of Calen; 38.7 km (24.0 mi) S of Proserpine; 86.0 km (53.4 mi) NW of Mackay; 1,033 km (642 mi) NNW of Brisbane

Government
  - State electorate: Whitsunday
  - Federal division: Dawson

Area
  - Total: 434.0 km^{2} (167.6 sq mi)

Population
  - Total: 539 (2021 census)
  - Density: 1.2419/km^{2} (3.217/sq mi)
- Time zone: UTC+10:00 (AEST)
- Postcode: 4799
Localities around Bloomsbury
Andromache	Thoopara	Lethebrook; Coral Sea
Bogie	Bloomsbury	Laguna Quays; Midge Point
Eungella Hinterland	Yalboroo	Mentmore

Bloomsbury is a town and coastal locality in the Mackay Region, Queensland, Australia. In the 2021 census, the locality of Bloomsbury had a population of 539 people.

== Geography ==
The Bruce Highway traverses the locality from south to north, passing through the town which is approximately in the centre of the locality. The North Coast railway also traverses the locality from south to north, running mostly parallel and immediately west of the highway, with the town serviced by the Bloomsbury railway station.

The Cathu State Forest is in the south-west of the locality. Apart from that, the locality is a mixture of low-lying farming land, mostly used for sugarcane. There is a cane tramway through the locality to transport the harvested sugarcane to the local sugar mills. Other parts of the locality are mountainous and undeveloped.

== History ==
The town presumably takes its name from the parish of the same name, which in turn was named after the cattle station founded by W. Macartney.

A postal receiving office opened at Bloomsbury around 1896, became a post office in March 1909, and closed around 1916. A second receiving office opened around 1925, became a post office in March 1926 and closed around 1993.

In 1923, a large steel-and-concrete railway bridge was erected over the Andromache River as part of the construction of the North Coast railway line. It is on the boundary of three adjacent localities (Andromache, Bloomsbury, and Thoopara).

Bloomsbury State School opened on 16 May 1927.

Elaroo Provisional School opened on 30 March 1936. It became Elaroo State School in 1955. It closed in 1969. It was immediately south of the Elaroo railway station at 21 Wales Road (20.7874°S 148.6168°E).

== Demographics ==
In the 2016 census, the locality of Bloomsbury had a population of 598 people.

In the 2021 census, the locality of Bloomsbury had a population of 539 people.

== Education ==
Bloomsbury State School is a government primary (Prep-6) school for boys and girls at 8545 Bruce Highway (20.7028°S 148.5955°E). In 2016, the school had an enrolment of 80 students with 7 teachers (5 full-time equivalent) and 6 non-teaching staff (3 full-time equivalent). In 2018, the school had an enrolment of 49 students with 5 teachers (3 full-time equivalent) and 8 non-teaching staff (3 full-time equivalent). In 2023, the school had an enrolment of 39 students and fewer than 5 teachers. The school draws its students from both the Bloomsbury and adjacent Midge Point localities.

There are no secondary schools in Bloomsbury. The nearest government secondary schools are Calen District State College in Calen to the south-east and Proserpine State High School in Proserpine to the north.

== Amenities ==
The Mackay Regional Council operates a mobile library service on a fortnightly schedule at the Bruce Highway near the school.

== Attractions ==
Clarke Range Lookout is at the end of the Cathu Cauley Road (20.8225°S 148.5413°E). The lookout provides excellent views of the Whitsunday Coast.
