= Breadalbane, Queensland =

Breadalbane
- Suburb
- Interactive map of Breadalbane
- Coordinates: 20.4416°S 148.6119°E
- Country: Australia
- State: Queensland
- LGA: Whitsunday Region
- Location: 4.4 km (2.7 mi) SE of Proserpine; 124 km (77 mi) NNW of Mackay; 268 km (167 mi) SW of Townsville; 1,094 km (680 mi) NNW of Brisbane

Government
  - State electorate: Whitsunday
  - Federal division: Dawson

Area
  - Total: 17.5 km^{2} (6.8 sq mi)
- Elevation: 0–9 m (0–30 ft)

Population
  - Total: 23 (2021 census)
  - Density: 1.31/km^{2} (3.40/sq mi)
- Time zone: UTC+10:00 (AEST)
- Postcode: 4800
Suburbs around Breadalbane
Proserpine	Glen Isla	Glen Isla
Kelsey Creek	Breadalbane	Glen Isla
Kelsey Creek	Goorganga Plains	Goorganga Plains

Breadalbane is a rural locality in the Whitsunday Region, Queensland, Australia. In the 2021 census, Breadalbane had a population of 23 people.

== Geography ==
Lethe Brook forms the south-western and south-eastern boundaries of the locality, entering from the south-west (the locality of Kelsey Creek) and exiting to the west (Glen Isla / Goorganga Plains).

The Bruce Highway enters the locality from the south-west (the locality of Kelsey Creek) and exits to the north-west (Proserpine / Glen Isla).

The land is flat and low-lying, being 0 to 9 metres (0 to 30 ft) above sea level. The land use is a mixture of grazing on native vegetation and growing sugarcane. There is a cane tramway passing through the locality to transport the harvested sugarcane to the local sugar mill.

== History ==
In 1894, George Augustus Henry Waite of the Breadalbane pastoral station offered up 500 acres (200 ha) of land suitable for growing sugarcane on a rent-free basis for three years to selectors who were willing to cultivate the land. By doing so, he hoped to persuade the Queensland Government to support the establishment of a local sugar mill.

== Demographics ==
In the 2016 census, Breadalbane had a population of 26 people.

In the 2021 census, Breadalbane had a population of 23 people.

== Education ==
There are no schools in Breadalbane. The nearest government primary and secondary schools are Proserpine State School and Proserpine State High School, both in neighbouring Proserpine to the north-west. There is also a Catholic primary-and-secondary school in Proserpine.
