= Goorganga Creek, Queensland =

Goorganga Creek
- Suburb
- Interactive map of Goorganga Creek
- Coordinates: 20.5191°S 148.5069°E
- Country: Australia
- State: Queensland
- LGA: Whitsunday Region
- Location: 23.9 km (14.9 mi) SW of Proserpine; 150 km (93 mi) NW of Mackay; 287 km (178 mi) SE of Townsville; 1,119 km (695 mi) NNW of Brisbane

Government
  - State electorate: Whitsunday
  - Federal division: Dawson

Area
  - Total: 54.2 km^{2} (20.9 sq mi)

Population
  - Total: 0 (2021 census)
  - Density: 0.000/km^{2} (0.000/sq mi)
- Time zone: UTC+10:00 (AEST)
- Postcode: 4800
Suburbs around Goorganga Creek
Pauls Pocket	Silver Creek	Gunyarra
Andromache	Goorganga Creek	Thoopara
Andromache	Andromache	Thoopara

Goorganga Creek is a rural locality in the Whitsunday Region, Queensland, Australia. In the 2021 census, Goorganga Creek had "no people or a very low population".

== Demographics ==
In the 2016 census, Goorganga Creek had a population of 7 people.

In the 2021 census, Goorganga Creek had "no people or a very low population".

== Education ==
There are no schools in Goorganga Creek. The nearest government primary and secondary schools are Proserpine State School and Proserpine State High School, both in Proserpine to the north-east. There is also a Catholic primary-and-secondary school in Proserpine.
