= Cape Upstart National Park =

National park in Queensland, Australia

- IUCN category II (national park)
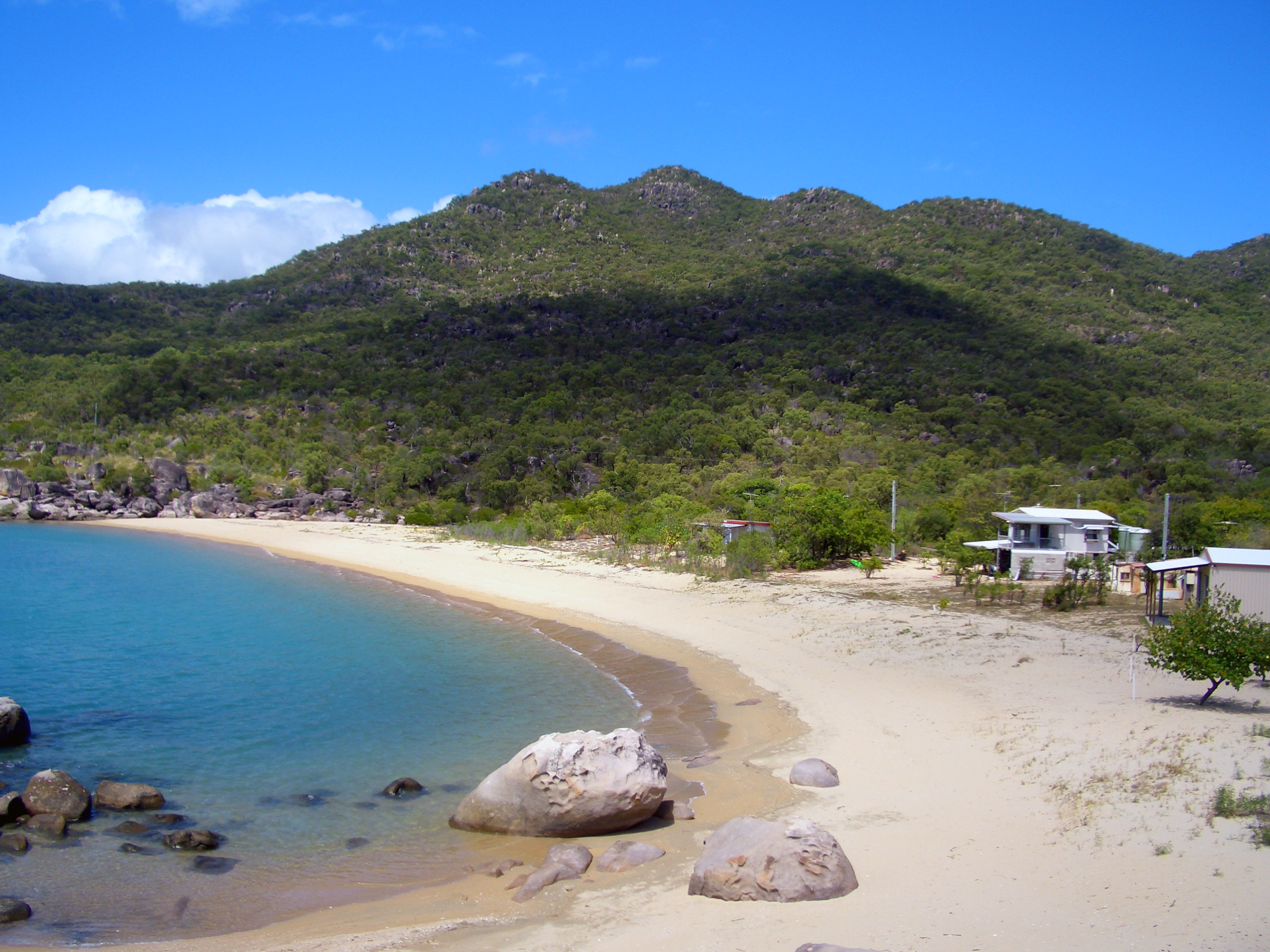
- Cape Upstart, 2010

- Location within Queensland
- Location: Queensland
- Nearest city: Gumlu
- Coordinates: 19°42′48″S 147°45′39″E
- Area: 84.80 km^{2} (32.74 sq mi)
- Established: 1969
- Governing body: Queensland Parks and Wildlife Service

Cape Upstart is a national park in the locality of Guthalungra in the Whitsunday Region local government area of North Queensland, Australia, 1,016 km northwest of Brisbane.

The Juru Clan of the Birri-Gubba Tribal Group lived on Cape Upstart for thousands of years.

== Cultural Importance of Cape Upstart ==
There are numerous middens in the sand dunes of Cape Upstart to demonstrate the connection of the Juru People to Cape Upstart. There are also several sacred sites, like the women's area at Worrungu Bay, and the stone arrangements near Mine Island, which the senior elder always stated were never 'fish traps' but an important ceremonial ground used for initiation. The ceremonial ground laid out the paths taken by Gubulla Munda (the Carpet Snake) when creating the land and islands inhabited by the Juru people and the paths followed by Gubulla Munda (the totem of the Juru Clan) in the Gubulla Munda Dreaming (the creation story of the Juru and Birri-Gubba People).

Cape Upstart was named by Lieutenant James Cook on 5 June 1770 during his voyage along the eastern coast of Australia in HM Bark Endeavour.

Europeans, mostly from the nearby Burdekin farming community, began - in the early twentieth century - building semi-permanent huts on the Cape's western foreshores. By the start of the twenty-first century these had mostly been replaced by permanent structures used mostly for recreational purposes, a small permanent population having also taken up residency by then.

== Native Title ==
In 2011 Justice Rares of the Federal Court of Australia recognised that the Juru People retained Native Title over Cape Upstart National Park. This decision was the culmination of a twenty-year struggle by the Juru People to get their Native Title recognised over Cape Upstart National Park. The Process was originally started by Peter Prior (Gulumba) in 1992 and was completed by his daughter, Renarta Prior (Gootha) in 2012.

== See also ==
- Protected areas of Queensland
- SS Gothenburg
