= Bogie, Queensland =

Bogie
- Suburb
- Interactive map of Bogie
- Coordinates: 20.3094°S 147.8794°E
- Country: Australia
- State: Queensland
- LGA: Whitsunday Region
- Location: 32.2 km (20.0 mi) NNE of Collinsville; 55.2 km (34.3 mi) SW of Bowen; 116 km (72 mi) W of Proserpine; 243 km (151 mi) SE of Townsville; 1,205 km (749 mi) NNW of Brisbane

Government
  - State electorate: Burdekin
  - Federal divisions: Dawson; Capricornia

Area
  - Total: 3,858.5 km^{2} (1,489.8 sq mi)

Population
  - Total: 207 (2021 census)
  - Density: 0.05365/km^{2} (0.1389/sq mi)
- Time zone: UTC+10:00 (AEST)
- Postcode: 4805
Suburbs around Bogie
Kirknie; Millaroo	Rangemore; Gumlu	Guthalungra; Bowen
Dalbeg; Eight Mile Creek	Bogie	Lake Proserpine
Mount Wyatt; Springlands	Newlands; Eungella Hinterland	Andromache; Bloomsbury

Bogie is a rural locality in the Whitsunday Region, Queensland, Australia. In the 2021 census, Bogie had a population of 207 people.

== Geography ==
The terrain is mountainous and relatively undeveloped. The principal land use is grazing on native vegetation.

The Bowen Developmental Road passes through the middle of the locality from the south-west (Springlands) to the north-east (Bowen). The Newlands railway system roughly follows the same route as the road through the locality with Binbee railway station serving the locality (20.3088°S 147.9262°E).

== History ==
Twenty-five Mile Camp Provisional School (also known as Aberdeen Provisional School) opened circa July 1919. In 1920, it was renamed Bogie Range Provisional School. It closed circa 1922.

On 4 December 1956, the Queensland Government opened for selection a grazing lot of 56,117 acres (22,710 ha) being portions 33 and 34, parish of Adaleigh, County of Herbert in the Bowen Land Agent's district and the Shire of Wangaratta (20.4302°S 147.9658°E). It was west of the Bogie Range and the Bogie River flowed through the property. The property is known as Reedy Creek as at 2020.

On 4 August 2022, a triple murder occurred on a cattle property in the Bogie area. One additional person was shot in the abdomen by the perpetrator, but survived the attack. The suspect was the neighbour of the victims and apparently there was some property dispute.

== Demographics ==
In the 2016 census, Bogie had a population of 161 people.

In the 2021 census, Bogie had a population of 207 people.

== Education ==
There are no schools in Bogie. Given the extensive size of the locality and limited road network, the school options would depend on the home location. For primary schooling, the options are:

- Osborne State School in Osborne to the north
- Gumlu State School in Gumlu to the north
- Collinsville State School in Collinsville to the west
- Merinda State School in Bowen to the east
- Bowen State School in Bowen to the east

Students in the south of Bogie are too distant to attend any of these primary schools.

For secondary schooling, the options are Bowen State High School in Bowen and Collinsville State High School in Collinsville.

Again, the northern and southern parts of Bogie are considered too remote for normal secondary school attendance.

The alternative to attending nearby school sare distance education or boarding school.
