= Guthalungra, Queensland =

Guthalungra
- Town
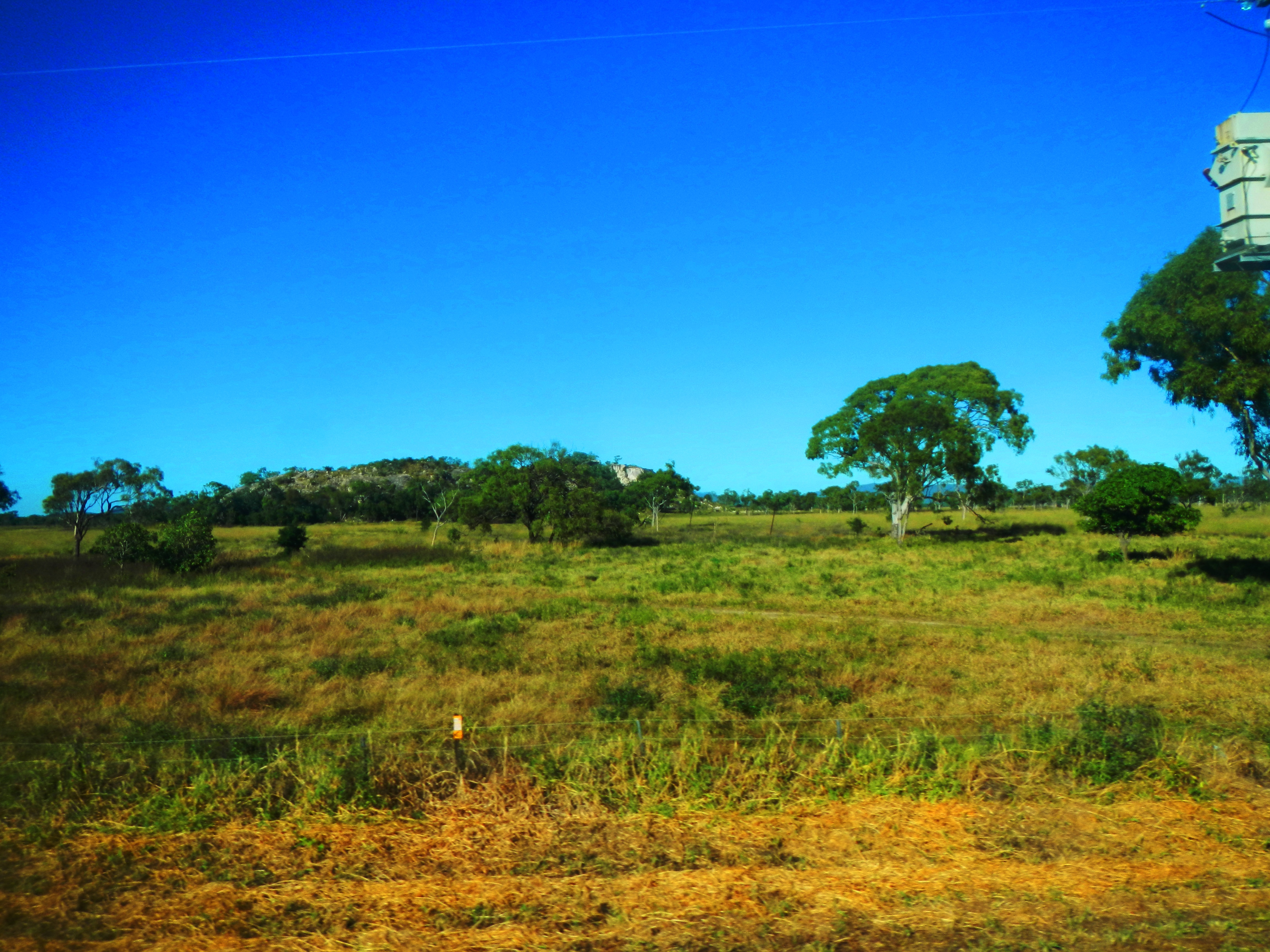
- Guthalungra scenery, 2013

- Interactive map of Guthalungra
- Coordinates: 19.925°S 147.8430°E
- Country: Australia
- State: Queensland
- LGA: Whitsunday Region
- Location: 48.5 km (30.1 mi) WNW of Bowen; 55.7 km (34.6 mi) SE of Home Hill; 109 km (68 mi) NE of Proserpine; 153 km (95 mi) SE of Townsville; 1,180 km (730 mi) NNW of Brisbane

Government
  - State electorate: Burdekin
  - Federal division: Dawson

Area
  - Total: 924.5 km^{2} (357.0 sq mi)

Population
  - Total: 112 (2021 census)
  - Density: 0.1211/km^{2} (0.3138/sq mi)
- Time zone: UTC+10:00 (AEST)
- Postcode: 4805
Localities around Guthalungra
Coral Sea	Coral Sea	Coral Sea
Gumlu	Guthalungra	Bowen
Bogie	Bowen	Bowen

Guthalungra is a rural town and coastal locality in the Whitsunday Region, Queensland, Australia. In the 2021 census, the locality of Guthalungra had a population of 112 people.

== Geography ==
The northern boundary of the locality is the Coral Sea including the large headland of Cape Upstart (19.7062°S 147.7527°E) rising to 680 metres. The northern half of Cape Upstart is protected as the Cape Upstart National Park. Cape Upstart was named by Lieutenant James Cook on 5 June 1770 during his voyage along the eastern coast of Australia in the HM Bark Endeavour.

Being a coastal locality, much of the land is low-lying but there are a number of peaks, including (from north to south):

- Station Hill (19.7752°S 147.8092°E) 724 metres (2,375 ft)
- Nobbies Lookout (19.8702°S 147.8122°E) 134 metres (440 ft)
- Moosie Hill (19.9056°S 147.8766°E) 127 metres (417 ft)
- The Maiden Mountain (19.9249°S 147.8760°E) 127 metres (417 ft)
- Mount Curlewis (19.9262°S 147.9507°E) 222 metres (728 ft)
- The Seven Sisters (19.9458°S 147.8968°E) 167 metres (548 ft)
- Mount Carew (19.9717°S 147.9885°E) 38 metres (125 ft)
- Mount Abbot (20.0996°S 147.7452°E) 1,059 metres (3,474 ft)
- Mount Mackenzie (20.1006°S 147.9522°E) 515 metres (1,690 ft)

The Bruce Highway traverses the locality from east to west passing through the town. The North Coast railway line runs almost immediately parallel with the highway with a number of rail stops within the locality (from north to south):

- Broadlands railway station, now abandoned (19.8854°S 147.7038°E)
- Kyburra railway station, now abandoned (19.8994°S 147.7491°E)
- Guthalungra railway station, serving the town (19.9243°S 147.8420°E)
- Wilmington railway station (19.9655°S 147.9894°E)

The Elliot River flows from south to north through the locality and the town into the Coral Sea (19.8833°S 147.8833°E) to the west of Cape Upstart. The river was named by explorer George Elphinstone Dalrymple after Gilbert Eliott, the first Speaker of the Queensland Legislative Assembly from 1860 to 1870.

The town of Guthalungra is on the Bruce Highway just west of its crossing of the Elliot River (19.925°S 147.8430°E).

== History ==
The town was named in 1889, using the name of a significant local Aboriginal Australian.

Guthalungra Provisional School opened in 1948, becoming Guthalungra State School on 27 February 1957. The school closed in 1988. It was located on the north side of the Bruce Highway (19.8333°S 147.7000°E).

== Demographics ==
In the 2016 census, the locality of Guthalungra had a population of 112 people.

In the 2021 census, the locality of Guthalungra had a population of 112 people.

== Economy ==
Guthalungra is predominantly an agricultural area, mostly grazing with some crop production. Pacific Reef Fisheries operate the Guthalungra Prawn Farm near the mouth of the Elliot River. The company uses the prawn farm as a hatchery for black tiger prawns (Penaeus monodon) and a place to conduct their breeding program. The prawns are then raised for harvest and processing at the company's 93 hectare facility at Ayr.

== Education ==
There are no schools in Guthalungra. The nearest government primary schools are Gumlu State School in neighbouring Gumlu to the west and Merinda State School in Merinda in neighbouring Bowen to the east. The nearest government secondary schools are Home Hill State High School in Home Hill to the north-west and Bowen State High School in neighbouring Bowen to the east. The south-west of Gurthalungra is not nearby either of these secondary schools, so distance education and boarding school would be other options. There are also Catholic schools in Home Hill and Bowen.

== Attractions ==
Nobbies Lookout is a tourist attraction (19.8703°S 147.8123°E).
