= Gumlu, Queensland =

Gumlu
- Town
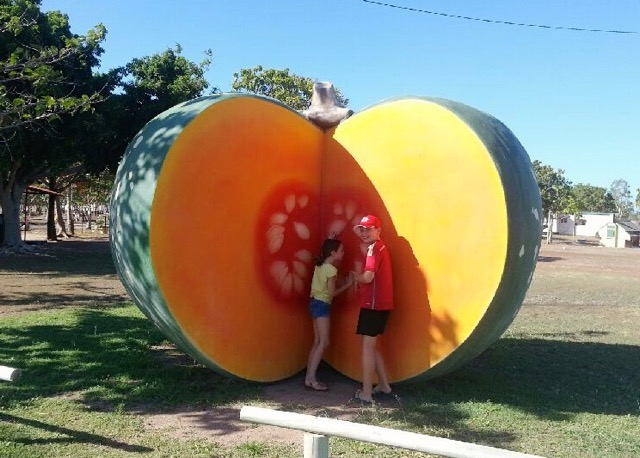
- Big Pumpkin at Gumlu, 2015

- Interactive map of Gumlu
- Coordinates: 19.8783°S 147.685°E
- Country: Australia
- State: Queensland
- LGA: Whitsunday Region
- Location: 38.9 km (24.2 mi) SE of Home Hill; 65.7 km (40.8 mi) WNW of Bowen; 126 km (78 mi) NW of Proserpine; 136 km (85 mi) SE of Townsville; 1,197 km (744 mi) NNW of Brisbane

Government
  - State electorate: Burdekin
  - Federal division: Dawson

Area
  - Total: 388.5 km^{2} (150.0 sq mi)

Population
  - Total: 124 (2021 census)
  - Density: 0.3192/km^{2} (0.827/sq mi)
- Time zone: UTC+10:00 (AEST)
- Postcode: 4805
Localities around Gumlu
Wangaratta	Wunjunga	Coral Sea
Rangemore	Gumlu	Guthalungra
Bogie	Bogie	Guthalungra

Gumlu is a rural town and coastal locality in the Whitsunday Region, Queensland, Australia. In the 2021 census, the locality of Gumlu had a population of 124 people.

== Geography ==
Gumlu is located in between Home Hill and Bowen. It is 38.9 kilometres (24.2 mi) by road from Home Hill and 65.7 kilometres (40.8 mi) by road from Bowen.

The town of Gumlu is located near the eastern boundary of the suburb. The Bruce Highway and the North Coast railway line traverse the locality from east to west passing through the town. There are three railway stops within the locality:

- Bobawaba railway station (19.8233°S 147.5737°E)
- Wakala railway station, now abandoned (19.8505°S 147.6225°E)
- Gumlu railway station, serving the town (19.8786°S 147.6860°E)

The north-eastern boundary of the locality is the Coral Sea. Molongle Creek (19.8333°S 147.7000°E) is the eastern boundary and Wangaratta Creek (19.8166°S 147.5833°E) is the western boundary. The north-eastern half of the locality is most flat land at sea level with the south-western half rising gradually with unnamed peaks of about 300 metres.

== History ==
The town takes its name from the Gumlu railway station which was assigned by the Queensland Railways Department on 15 January 1912, and is believed to be a corruption of an Aboriginal word gunyaloo, meaning rock wallaby.

Molongle Creek Provisional School opened on 13 October 1913. It became Molongle Creek State School on 1 December 1914. In 1920 it was renamed Gumlu State School.

Houses have boomed in Gumlu lately by about 100% in a year, because of a coal mine opening up.

== Demographics ==
In the 2016 census, the locality of Gumlu had a population of 181 people.

In the 2021 census, the locality of Gumlu had a population of 124 people.

== Economy ==
Gumlu is a major region for growing of winter vegetables from April/May through to November with mangoes being harvested in the summer months. To celebrate their horticultural focus, a "Big Pumpkin" and a "Big Watermelon" have been constructed in a public rest area beside the Bruce Highway in the town

== Education ==
Gumlu State School is a government primary (Prep-6) school for boys and girls at De Salis Street (19.8794°S 147.6858°E). In 2016, the school had an enrolment of 14 students with 2 teachers (1 full-time equivalent) and 5 non-teaching staff (2 full-time equivalent). In 2018, the school had an enrolment of 19 students with 2 teachers and 6 non-teaching staff (3 full-time equivalent).

There is no secondary school in Gumlu. The nearest government secondary school is Home Hill State High School in Home Hill to the north-west.

== Amenities ==
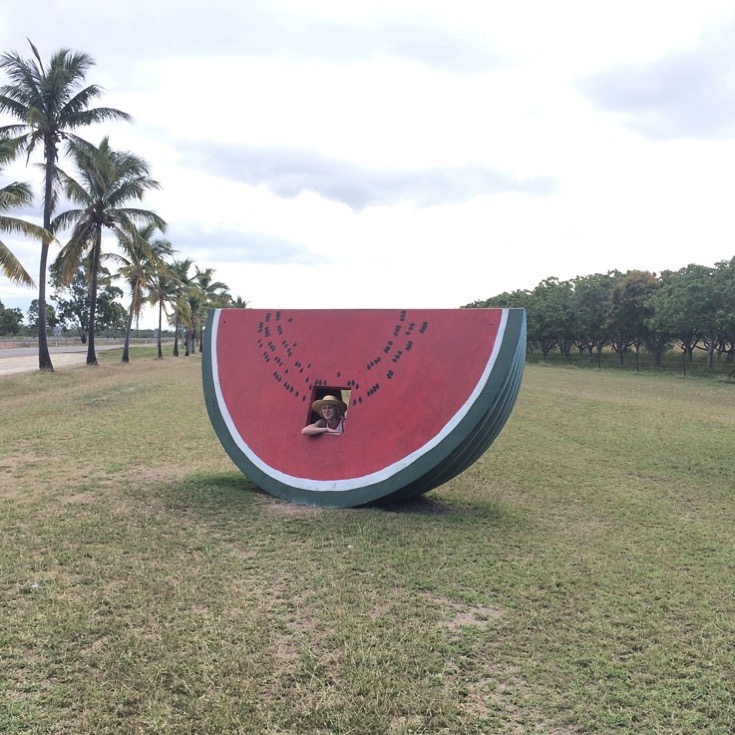
Big Watermelon at Gumlu, 2017

Gumlu has a petrol station.
