= Peter Faust Dam =

Dam west of Proserpine, Queensland

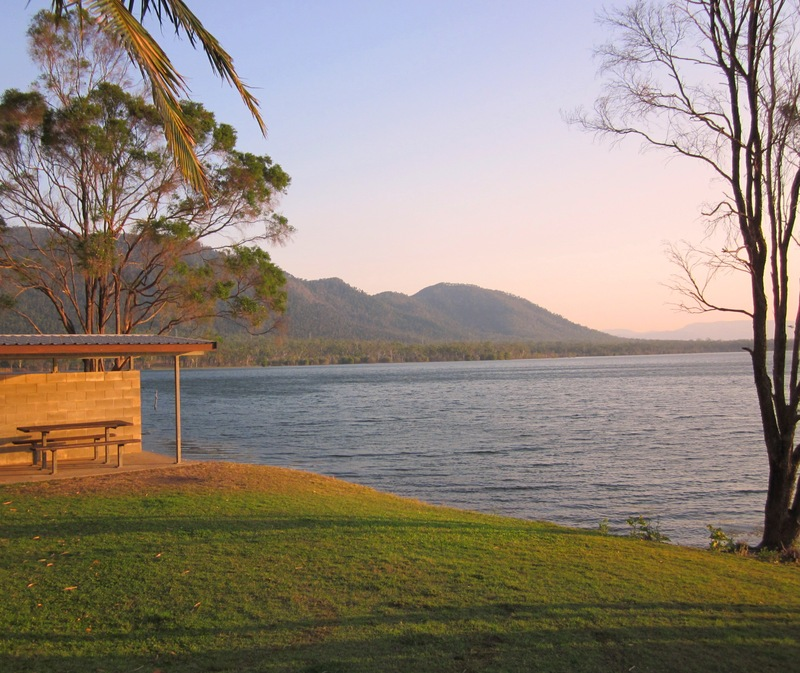
- A view across the dam from a picnic area, 2011

- Location of the dam in Queensland
- Interactive map of Peter Faust Dam
- Location: near Proserpine, North Queensland
- Coordinates: 20°21′58″S 148°22′59″E
- Purpose: Irrigation; Flood mitigation; Water supply; Recreation
- Status: Operational
- Construction began: 1989
- Opening date: 1990
- Built by: Thiess Bros
- Operator: SunWater

Dam and spillways
- Type of dam: Earth fill dam
- Impounds: Proserpine River
- Height (foundation): 51 m (167 ft)
- Length: 535 m (1,755 ft)
- Elevation at crest: 85.6 m (281 ft) AHD
- Width (crest): 10 m (33 ft)
- Dam volume: 1,570×10^{3} m^{3} (55×10^{6} cu ft)
- Spillway type: Uncontrolled
- Spillway length: 38.9 m (128 ft)
- Spillway capacity: 1,670 m^{3}/s (59,000 cu ft/s)

Reservoir
- Creates: Lake Proserpine
- Total capacity: 491,400 ML (398,400 acre⋅ft)
- Catchment area: 270 km^{2} (100 sq mi)
- Surface area: 4,325 ha (10,690 acres)
- Maximum water depth: 39.6 m (130 ft)
- Normal elevation: 80 m (260 ft) AHD
- Website sunwater.com.au

The Peter Faust Dam is an earth-filled embankment dam dam across the Proserpine River, located near Proserpine, in the eponymous settlement, in the Whitsunday Region of North Queensland, Australia. The resultant reservoir is called Lake Proserpine. Completed in 1990, the dam was built for the purposes of irrigation, flood mitigation, supply of potable water, and recreation.

== Overview ==
Thiess Bros was contracted to construct the dam. Construction of the Peter Faust Dam began in May 1989 and was completed in December 1990, four and a half months ahead of schedule, in time for a massive downpour which filled the dam.

The earth-filled dam wall is 51 metres (167 ft) high and 535 metres (1,755 ft) long. The resultant reservoir has capacity of 491,400 megalitres (398,400 acre⋅ft) when full, covering an area of 4,325 hectares (10,690 acres), drawn from a catchment area of 270 square kilometres (100 sq mi). The uncontrolled ungated ogee crest spillway has a concrete-lined chute with flip bucket, and is capable of handling 1,670 cubic metres per second (59,000 cu ft/s).

The dam reached a level of 98.8% in March 1991, and finally overflowed for the first time in December 2010. It reached its highest level of 1.48m above the spillway in March 2011. The dam overflowed again in March 2012, and March 2013. The dam reached its lowest level of 10.7% in 2007. The dam overflowed again on March 7th 2026.

The dam was named in honour of Peter Faust, a former mayor of the Proserpine District, whose family had farmed in the district since 1895. Faust was the driving force for the establishment of the dam.

== Fishing ==
A Stocked Impoundment Permit is required to fish in the dam.

== See also ==
- List of dams and reservoirs in Australia
