= Dryander National Park =

National park in Queensland, Australia

- IUCN category II (national park)
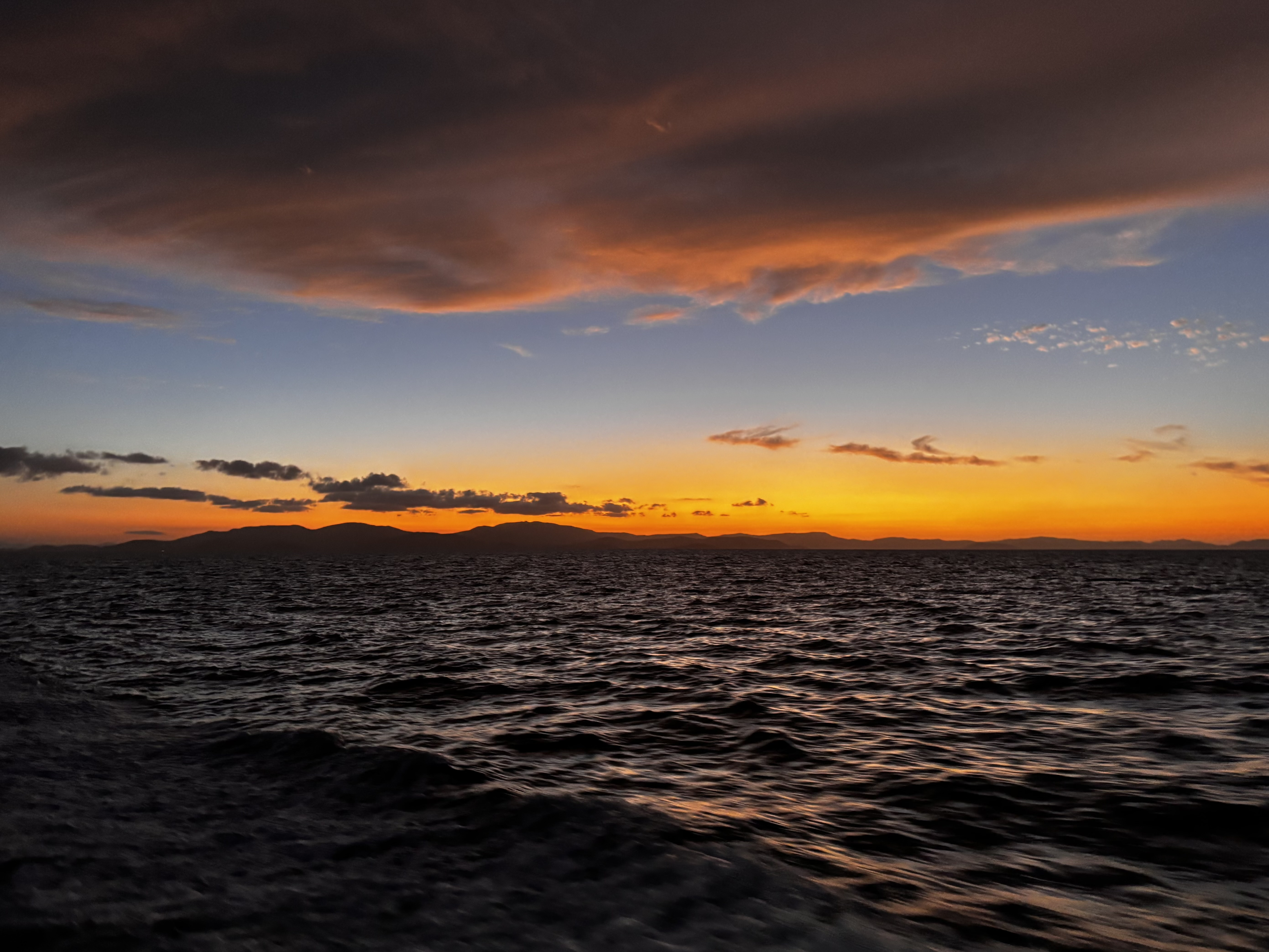
- Dryander National Park seen from the Coral Sea

- Location within Queensland
- Location: Queensland
- Coordinates: 20°13′05″S 148°33′57″E
- Area: 118.82 km^{2} (45.88 sq mi)
- Established: 1938
- Governing body: Queensland Parks and Wildlife Service

Dryander National Park is an Australian national park in Queensland, 938 km northwest of Brisbane, and north of Proserpine. It comprises roughly 55 km of the Coral Sea coastline. The most prominent mountain in the park is Mount Drylander and rises to 765 metres above sea level; it was named after Swedish botanist Jonas Carlsson Dryander (1748–1810) in 1820 by Phillip Parker King.

== Wildlife ==
The endangered Proserpine rock-wallaby has a refuge in the park. 52 species of plants have been recorded in Dryander National Park.

== See also ==
- Protected areas of Queensland
