= HMS Salamander =

Ships bearing the name HMS Salamander include:

This list may be incomplete.

- HMS Salamander (1687) was a bomb ship built in 1687 at the Chatham Dockyard. Sold in 1713.
- HMS Salamander (1730), renamed from Basilisk while on the stocks, was a bomb ketch of 26576/94 tons (bm) launched on 4 September 1730 at the Woolwich Dockyard. Sold in 1744 to the British East India Company.
- HMS Salamander (1745) was a fire ship purchased in 1745. Sold in 1748.
- HMS Salamander (1757) was a fire ship purchased in 1757. Sold in 1761.
- HMS Salamander (1778) was HMS Shark, converted to a fireship and renamed in 1778. The Navy sold her in 1783. She then became a Greenland whaler, merchantman, convict transport to Australia, South Seas whaler, merchantman again, and slave ship. She was last listed in 1811, but did not appear in newspapers after 1804.
- HMS Salamander (1804) was the mercantile Busy, launched at Yarmouth in 1777 that the Navy purchased in 1804 for use as a fireship but sold in 1807.
- HMS Salamander (1832) was an 818-ton, 4-gun paddle sloop launched in 1832 and broken up in 1883.
- HMS Salamander (1889) was a Sharpshooter-class torpedo gunboat built in 1889 at the Chatham Dockyard. Sold for breaking in 1906.
- HMS Salamander (J86) was a Halcyon-class minesweeper launched in 1936. She participated in the Second World War. She was scrapped in 1947.
