= Whitsunday Coast Airport =

Whitsunday Coast Airport Proserpine Airport

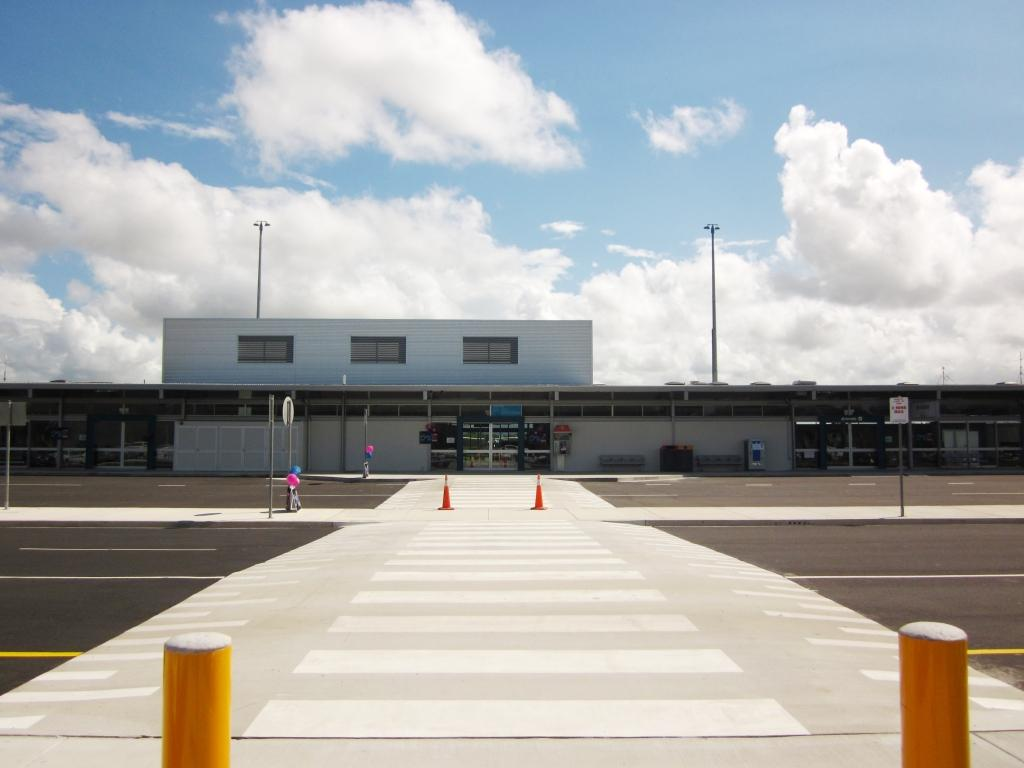
- IATA: PPP; ICAO: YBPN

Summary
- Airport type: Public
- Owner: Whitsunday Regional Council
- Operator: Whitsunday Regional Council
- Location: Gunyarra, Queensland, Australia
- Elevation AMSL: 82 ft (25 m)
- Coordinates: 20°29′42″S 148°33′06″E
- Website: https://www.whitsundaycoastairport.com.au/

Map
- Location in Queensland

Runways
Direction	Length		Surface
Direction	m	ft	Surface
11/29	2,073	6,801	Asphalt
06/24	1,100	3,608	Unmarked Asphalt
- Sources: Australian AIP and aerodrome chart

Whitsunday Coast Airport (IATA: PPP, ICAO: YBPN), also known as Proserpine Airport, is located in Gunyarra, Queensland, Australia, 14 kilometres (8.7 mi) south of Proserpine. The airport serves as a gateway for mainland and offshore island destinations, with flights providing connections to Brisbane, Cairns, Melbourne, and Sydney.

In 2024 the airport served 500,000 passengers, it is expected that by 2035 the airport will be handling in excess of 900,000 passengers.

== History ==
Plans to build an airfield in Proserpine commenced in 1936, however construction was delayed due to a lack of funding. Construction of the airport finally began in 1950, officially opening on 3 November 1951.

In September 2001, the airport suffered heavily from the collapse of Ansett Australia, who at the time were the biggest operator out of Proserpine with direct services to Brisbane, Sydney and Melbourne, as well as seasonal flights to the Gold Coast and Adelaide.

The airport underwent an upgrade in 2010, with the upgraded terminal officially opened on 20 December 2011.

In January 2014, Whitsunday Regional Council announced it was to discuss with the Government of Queensland the process for designating the airport precinct a PDA (Priority Development Area). This would make the future process of extending the runway the relatively short distance required to receive international services easier and to alleviate the industrial land crisis that has been affecting the Whitsunday Region for many years.

== Airlines and destinations ==
Airlines	Destinations
Jetstar	Brisbane, Melbourne, Sydney
Skytrans Australia	Cairns
Virgin Australia	Brisbane

== Public Transport ==
Whitsunday Transit operate bus services from the airport. Uber and Taxi are available as well as hire car.
