= Rangemore, Queensland (Burdekin Shire) =

Rangemore
- Suburb
- Interactive map of Rangemore
- Coordinates: 19.9890°S 147.4088°E
- Country: Australia
- State: Queensland
- LGA: Shire of Burdekin
- Location: 63.1 km (39.2 mi) SSW of Home Hill; 70.2 km (43.6 mi) SSW of Ayr; 157 km (98 mi) SSE of Townsville; 1,313 km (816 mi) NNW of Brisbane

Government
  - State electorate: Burdekin
  - Federal division: Dawson

Area
  - Total: 325.5 km^{2} (125.7 sq mi)

Population
  - Total: 0 (2021 census)
  - Density: 0.0000/km^{2} (0.000/sq mi)
- Time zone: UTC+10:00 (AEST)
- Postcode: 4806
Suburbs around Rangemore
Kirknie	Wangaratta	Gumlu
Kirknie	Rangemore	Bogie
Bogie	Bogie	Bogie

Rangemore is a rural locality in the Shire of Burdekin, Queensland, Australia. In the 2021 census, Rangemore had "no people or a very low population".

== Geography ==
The predominant land use is grazing on native vegetation with small areas of crop growing.

== Demographics ==
In the 2016 census, Rangemore "no people or a very low population".

In the 2021 census, Rangemore had "no people or a very low population".

== Education ==
There are no schools in Rangemore. The nearest government primary schools are Gumlu State School in neighbouring Gumlu to the north-east and Osborne State School in Osborne to the north. The nearest government secondary school is Home Hill State High School in Home Hill to the north. However, it might too distant for students in some parts of Rangemore; the alternatives are distance education and boarding school.
