= O'Connell River =

River in Queensland, Australia

O'Connell
- Location of O'Connell river mouth in Queensland

Location
- Country: Australia
- State: Queensland
- Region: North Queensland

Physical characteristics
- Source
  - location: Clarke Range (Yalboroo)
  - coordinates: 20.94181°S 148.65003°E
  - elevation: 410 m (1,350 ft)
- Mouth: Coral Sea
  - location: Lethebrook, Whitsunday Region / Bloomsbury, Mackay Region
  - coordinates: 20.56833°S 148.66667°E
  - elevation: 0 m (0 ft)
- Length: 34.2 km (21.3 mi)
- Basin size: 886.5 km^{2} (342.3 sq mi)
- Discharge
  - location: Near mouth
  - average: 15.75 m^{3}/s (497 GL/a)

Basin features
- Tributaries
  - left: Ceadar Creek, Boundary Creek, Dingo Creek, Andromache
  - right: Horse Creek, Plantain Creek, Gibson Creek, Dinner Creek

The O'Connell River is a river in North Queensland, Australia.

The headwaters of the river rise in the Clarke Range, just north of the Eungella National Park. It flows north parallel with the Bruce Highway, then discharges into the Repulse Fish Habitat area near Covering Beach and onto the Coral Sea.

The river has a catchment area of 2,388 square kilometres (922 sq mi), of which 128 km^{2} (49 sq mi) is composed of estuarine wetlands.

== See also ==
- List of rivers of Australia § Queensland
