= Proserpine River =

Proserpine
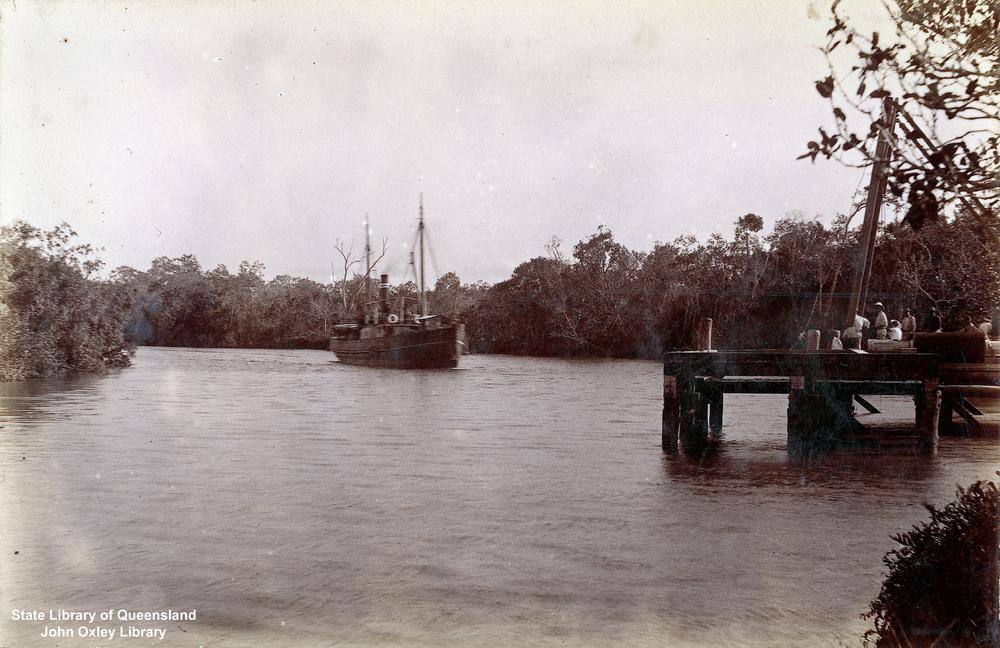
- Boat approaching the wharf on Proserpine River, Queensland, ca. 1899

- Location of Proserpine river mouth in Queensland

Location
- Country: Australia
- Territory: Queensland
- Region: Whitsunday Region

Physical characteristics
- Source: Mount Quandong
  - location: Great Dividing Range, Whitsunday Region, Australia
  - elevation: 110 m (360 ft)
- Mouth: Repulse Bay
  - location: Coral Sea, Australia
  - coordinates: 20°26′25″S 148°40′41″E
  - elevation: 0 m (0 ft)
- Length: 69 km (43 mi)
- Basin size: 1,006.9 km^{2} (388.8 sq mi)
- Discharge
  - location: Near mouth
  - average: 13 m^{3}/s (410 GL/a)

Basin features
- Waterbodies: Peter Faust Dam

The Proserpine River is a river in Whitsunday Region of Queensland, Australia. The river is important to crocodile conservation as it provides habitat for Queensland's most dense population of the animal. The river is used by crocodile tourist operators.

== Course ==
The headwaters of the river rise below Mount Quandong in the Great Dividing Range and initially flow northwards while being fed by numerous creeks running from the Clarke Range to the west and the Normanby Range to the south. The river enters Lake Proserpine then exits in an easterly direction and flowing past to the south of Foxdale, then to the north of Proserpine. It continues east crossing the Bruce Highway then veers south through Melaleuca forests and discharges through estuarine wetlands and mangrove ecosystems into Repulse Bay near Conway Beach and then onto the Coral Sea.

== Catchment ==
The river has a catchment area of 2,494 square kilometres (963 sq mi) of which an area of 127 square kilometres (49 sq mi) is composed of estuarine wetlands. The area is predominantly used for grazing cattle with extensive areas also used for sugar cane production.

The estuary functions as a result of river energy with a tide dominated delta. It is in a modified condition as a result of agriculture. It contains 34.7 square kilometres (13 sq mi) of mangroves and 8.1 square kilometres (3 sq mi) of intertidal flats.

The Proserpine River is one of two major rivers whose catchment influences the coral reefs of the Whitsunday Islands.

== History ==
The name of the Proserpine first appeared in 1861 when the Emmerson family acquired the lease for a cattle station which they are thought to have named the Proserpine Creek Run near the river mouth. It is generally believed that the explorer George Dalrymple named the river although it is likely that he would never have traversed the river. The name of the river is an anglicised version of the Roman Proserpina, a goddess of fertility.

The Proserpine was rated as the river in Queensland where people were most likely to see a saltwater crocodile from 2000 to 2012, with 151 sightings recorded over the period. In 2015 a nest of up to 30 baby crocodiles were thought to have been stolen from the river, despite crocodiles being a protected species in Queensland. According to a survey conducted from 2016 to 2019, the Proserpine River had the highest density of crocodiles in Queensland, with 5.5 per kilometre (3.4 per mile).

== See also ==
- List of rivers of Australia § Queensland
