= Proserpine State High School =

Coordinates: 20°24′22.97″S 148°34′53.54″E

Location
- 4 Ruge Street; Proserpine, Queensland, 4800; Australia

Information
- School type: Public
- Established: 1963
- School district: Whitsunday
- Principal: Don McDermid
- Grades: 7–12
- Age range: 12–18
- Enrollment: ~1300 students
- Average class size: 25
- Houses: Cook, Flinders, Kennedy, Oxley
- Colours: Blue, yellow, and green
- Slogan: "Success. Together.”
- Yearbook: The Arrow
- Website: proserpineshs.eq.edu.au

Proserpine State High School (established in 1963) is a public high school in the town of Proserpine in Queensland, Australia. It primarily hosts students from Proserpine and Cannonvale, although does host a small amount of students from Bowen and other nearby rural areas.

== Staff ==
=== Don McDermid ===
Staff Role: Principal

Principal Don McDermid is the current acting principal of Proserpine State High School and has been since at least 2012. Noteably he was a finalist for Australian Secondary Principal of the Year 2012.

== History ==
=== Campus ===
The school was established in 1963. Since then, several buildings have been refurbished and a number of new structures have been erected but the school still retains a lot of its original façades and layout. The school contains many lettered blocks, starting from A block right up to O block. N block is the area of the school where the grade 7s are, D block grade 8s, the Quadrangle grades 9-10, and A block grades 11–12.

Over the last two decades, significant investment has occurred at the school, on 13 March 2019 a new $20 million upgrade and expansion was launched by Education Minister Grace Grace. Stage 1 of this project included the construction of a new two-level learning centre comprising five classrooms, one flexible learning area, a design studio and covered under-croft area, with the potential to add an extra four classrooms later, this was completed in December 2019. Stage 2 of the project started as expected in July 2019, the construction of a new performing arts centre, this is completed in late 2020.

== Curriculum ==
The school teaches subjects required by the Queensland Studies Authority. The school has a well-funded LOTE and science curriculum but is not particularly underfunded in any other area.
