= Proserpine, Queensland =

Proserpine
- Town
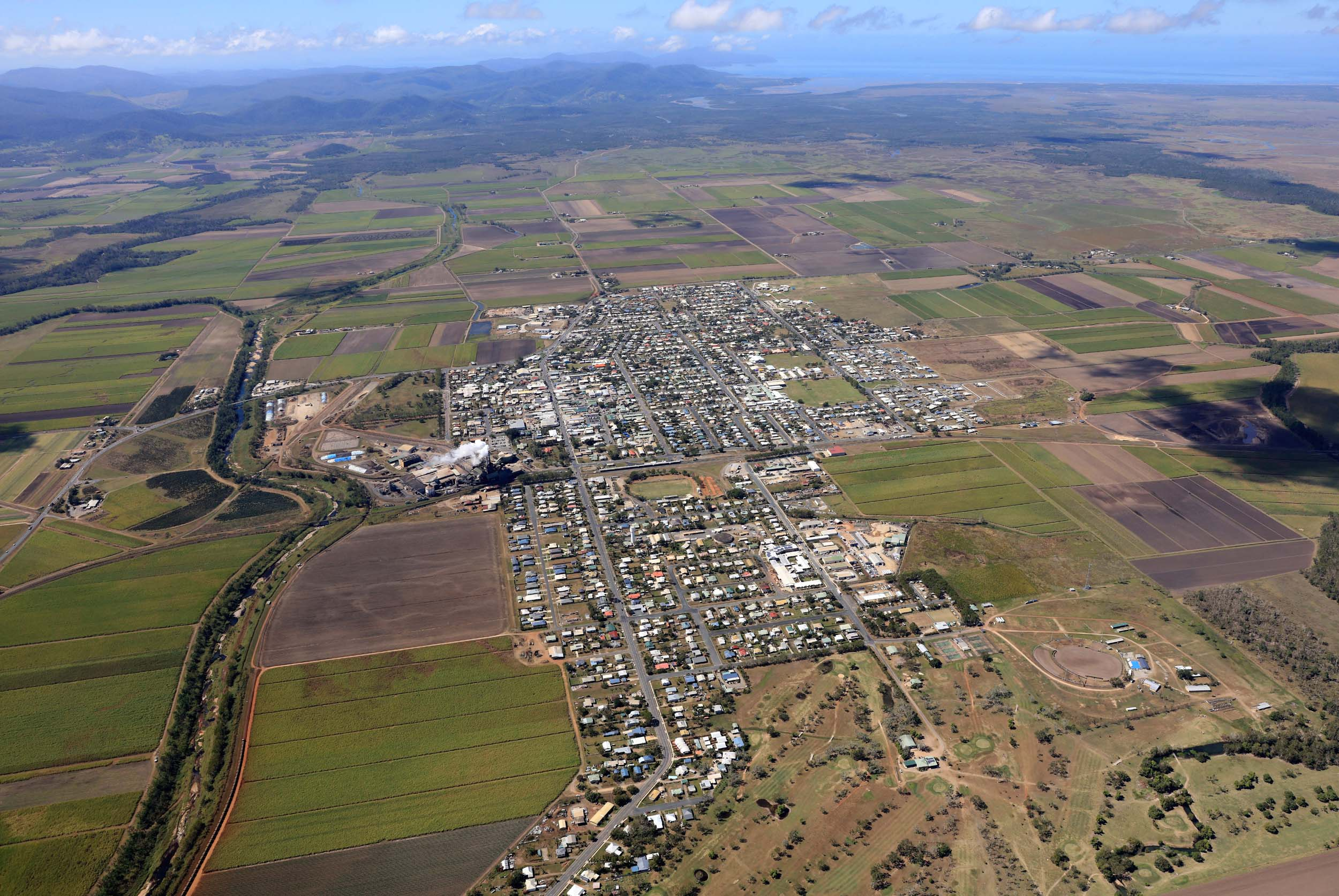
- Aerial image of Proserpine

- Interactive map of Proserpine
- Coordinates: 20.4016°S 148.5808°E
- Country: Australia
- State: Queensland
- LGA: Whitsunday Region
- Location: 67.4 km (41.9 mi) SE of Bowen; 126 km (78 mi) NW of Mackay; 262 km (163 mi) SE of Townsville; 1,071 km (665 mi) NNW of Brisbane
- Established: 1890s

Government
  - State electorate: Whitsunday
  - Federal division: Dawson

Area
  - Total: 23.4 km^{2} (9.0 sq mi)
- Elevation: 20 m (66 ft)

Population
  - Total: 3,614 (2021 census)
  - Density: 154.4/km^{2} (400.0/sq mi)
- Time zone: UTC+10:00 (AEST)
- Postcode: 4800
- Mean max temp: 28.9 °C (84.0 °F)
- Mean min temp: 17.7 °C (63.9 °F)
- Annual rainfall: 1,468.4 mm (57.81 in)
Localities around Proserpine
Crystal Brook	Hamilton Plains	Glen Isla
Kelsey Creek	Proserpine	Glen Isla
Kelsey Creek	Breadalbane	Breadalbane

Proserpine (/ˈprɒsərpaɪn/) is a town and locality in the Whitsunday Region, Queensland, Australia. In the 2021 census, the locality of Proserpine had a population of 3,614 people.

== Geography ==
Proserpine is situated on the Bruce Highway.

Proserpine is located on the North Coast line with Proserpine railway station located in Hinschen Street in the town centre.

The town is located along the banks of the Proserpine River and is surrounded by land used for growing sugarcane and grazing.

Proserpine is locally governed by Whitsunday Regional Council, a product of amalgamation of the former Shire of Whitsunday with the former Shire of Bowen. Proserpine is situated within the Queensland electorate of Whitsunday, and the federal electorate of Dawson.

== History ==
The Gia people are the traditional custodians of the Proserpine area. Giya (also known as Kia) is a language of North Queensland. The Giya language region includes the landscape within the local government boundaries of the Whitsunday Regional Council, particularly the towns of Bowen and Proserpine.

It has been claimed that George Elphinstone Dalrymple named the Proserpine River on an expedition in 1859, but has also been claimed that the first use of the name was in August 1861 when the Emmerson family applied for a tenure over the Proserpine Creek run. The name Proserpine derives from the Roman goddess Proserpina, who also appears in Greek mythology as Persephone.

The first British colonists arrived in the early 1860s with Daniel Emmerson forming the Proserpine pastoral station. Frederick Bode and William Dangar took up land at Bromby Park and Goorganga Creek, while Charles Bradley and James Colling established properties along the Gregory River.

In 1866, Inspectors John Marlow and John Isley of the Native Police, a government funded paramilitary organisation, conducted patrols through the Proserpine area. Following a large number of cattle being killed by Aboriginal people, the native police dispersed around six "large mobs" of Aboriginal people during this mission. Marlow used Daniel Emmerson's property for his stock-yard and bought horses from him.

The Crystal Brook Sugar Company was formed in 1882 and established a sugar industry in the region a year later. A sugar mill was built and the labouring on the plantation was performed by imported South Sea Islanders. In 1893 the plantation, which was located at Glen Isla close to the present Proserpine township, was closed and smaller sugar farms run by white owner-operators were established.

Proserpine Lower Provisional School opened on 16 August 1897. In 1904, it was renamed Proserpine Provisional School, becoming Proserpine State School on 15 March 1906. In 1937, the school was expanded to include a High Top to offer secondary schooling beyond Year 8. In 1946, the Windermere school building at Cannon Valley was relocated to Proserpine State School which was expanding to offer secondary schooling.

St Catherine's Catholic School was established in 1925 by the Sisters of Mercy. It was a primary school named in honour of St Catherine of Alexandria. The school was on the northern side of Marathon Street, opposite Telia Street (20.4039°S 148.5857°E). In 2012, the school relocated to a new larger campus known as St Catherine's Catholic College, enabling the school to provide secondary education.

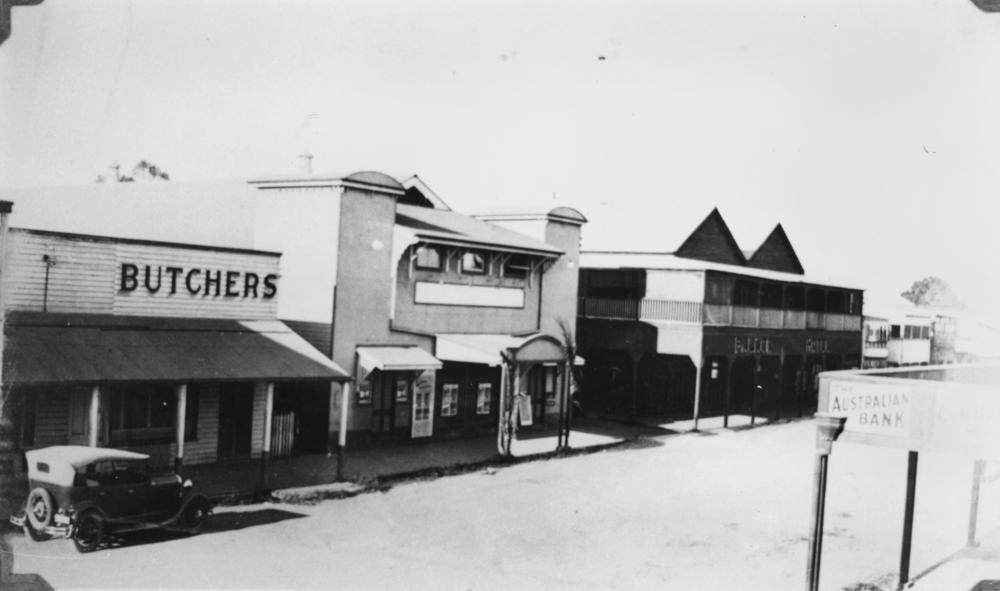
Main Street, Proserpine in the 1930s

In 1944, the Australian Field Experimental Station was constructed at Gunyarra just south of the town. It was constructed to test and research the effectiveness of Mustard Gas in tropical conditions.

Proserpine Airport (now Whitsunday Coast Airport) opened in 1951.

Proserpine State High School opened on 29 January 1963. Initially the school operated from single building but a second building was constructed during 1963. It replaced the High Top at Proserpine State School.

The Proserpine Library opened in 1998.

In March 2017, Proserpine suffered effects from Cyclone Debbie.

== Demographics ==
In the 2016 census, the locality of Proserpine had a population of 3,562 people.

In the 2021 census, the locality of Proserpine had a population of 3,614 people.

== Heritage listings ==
Heritage-listed sites include:

- Proserpine Hospital, Herbert Street
- St Paul's Anglican Church, Main Street

== Economy ==
The towns main industries are sugar production and the services industry. A sugar mill was established in 1897 and Proserpine Sugar Mill is now recognised as one of the most modern sugar mills in the world. The town also functions as an important regional service centre for the Whitsunday area. Government, health, education, retail and community services provide a significant proportion of local employment. Major institutions and employers include the Queensland Government, Queensland Health, the Catholic Diocese of Townsville, Whitsunday Regional Council and aged-care providers. Proserpine also contains a range of retail, professional, construction, transport and other service businesses serving both the town’s population and surrounding rural areas.

The town has new housing estates under construction (2026) and is noted for its high property price growth.

== Education ==
Proserpine State School is a government primary (Early Childhood to Year 6) school for boys and girls at 33 Renwick Road (20.4090°S 148.5823°E). In 2018, the school had an enrolment of 565 students with 45 teachers (41 full-time equivalent) and 25 non-teaching staff (19 full-time equivalent). It includes a special education program.

St Catherine's Catholic College is a Catholic primary and secondary (Kindergarten to Year 12) school for boys and girls at 96 Renwick Road (20.4105°S 148.5899°E). In 2018, the school had an enrolment of 623 students with 59 teachers (52 full-time equivalent) and 60 non-teaching staff (38 full-time equivalent).

Proserpine State High School is a government secondary (7–12) school for boys and girls at 4 Ruge Street (20.4059°S 148.5818°E). In 2018, the school had an enrolment of 1,062 students with 91 teachers (88 full-time equivalent) and 47 non-teaching staff (32 full-time equivalent). It includes a special education program.

== Facilities ==
The Proserpine Hospital in Taylor St is the primary health service for the Whitsunday Region.

== Amenities ==
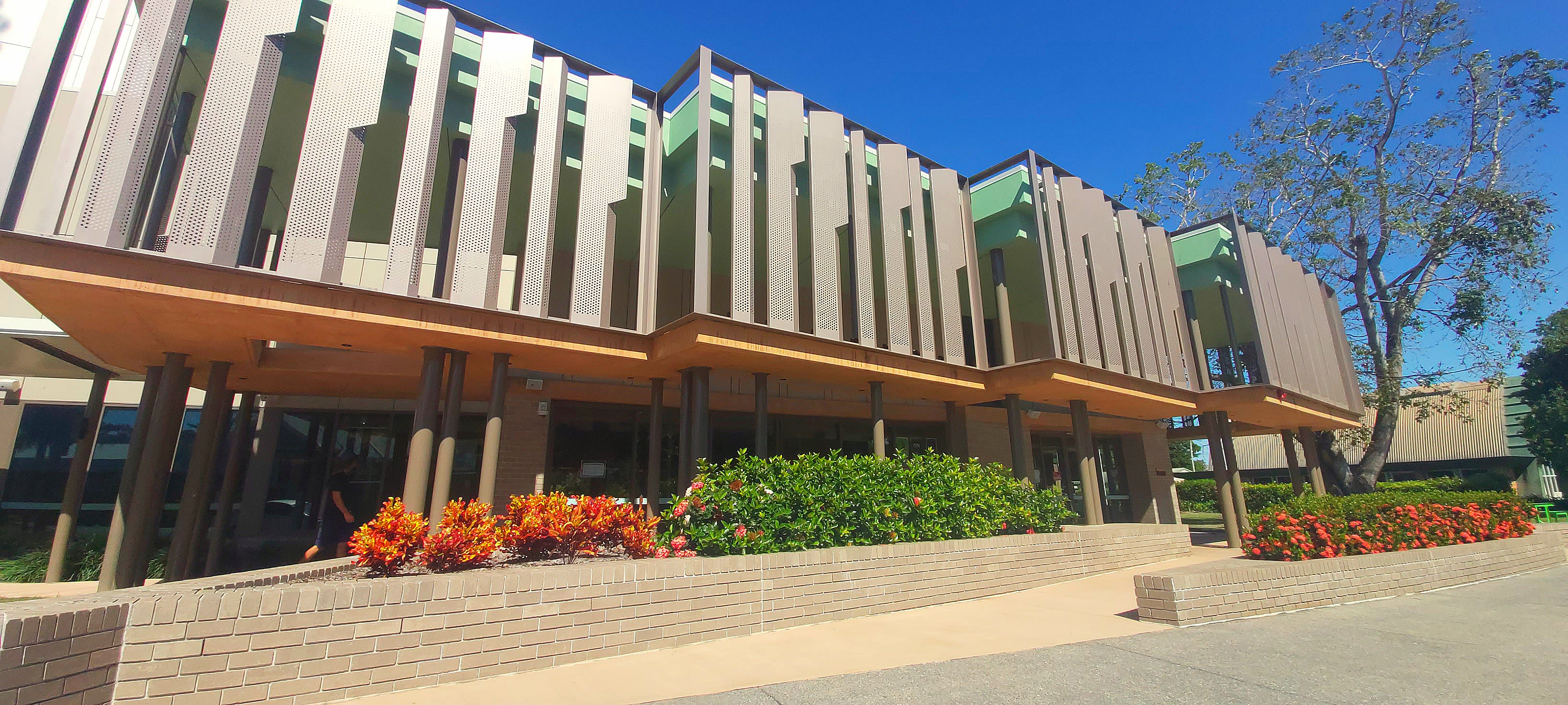
The Proserpine Entertainment Centre

The Proserpine Entertainment Centre is at 14 Main Street. In March 2022, it reopened after being rebuilt following damage caused by Tropical Cyclone Debbie in March 2017.

The Proserpine Library is at 12 Main Street (20.40208°S 148.58013°E).

== Climate ==
Similar to nearby Mackay, Proserpine has a monsoon-influenced humid subtropical climate (Köppen: Cwa) bordering on a tropical savanna climate (Köppen: Aw). The town experiences hot, rainy summers and pleasant, dry winters.

Climate data for Proserpine Airport (20.49°S 148.56°E, 20 m (66 ft) m AMSL) (1872-1990 data)
Month	Jan	Feb	Mar	Apr	May	Jun	Jul	Aug	Sep	Oct	Nov	Dec	Year
Record high °C (°F)	41.2 (106.2)	40.4 (104.7)	37.9 (100.2)	35.4 (95.7)	32.1 (89.8)	32.0 (89.6)	32.7 (90.9)	34.1 (93.4)	36.3 (97.3)	39.0 (102.2)	44.9 (112.8)	42.9 (109.2)	44.9 (112.8)
Mean daily maximum °C (°F)	31.6 (88.9)	31.2 (88.2)	30.4 (86.7)	28.8 (83.8)	26.6 (79.9)	24.8 (76.6)	24.5 (76.1)	25.9 (78.6)	28.5 (83.3)	30.5 (86.9)	31.7 (89.1)	32.2 (90.0)	28.9 (84.0)
Mean daily minimum °C (°F)	22.7 (72.9)	22.8 (73.0)	21.8 (71.2)	19.3 (66.7)	15.9 (60.6)	12.8 (55.0)	11.3 (52.3)	11.7 (53.1)	14.5 (58.1)	17.5 (63.5)	19.8 (67.6)	21.8 (71.2)	17.7 (63.9)
Record low °C (°F)	15.9 (60.6)	15.0 (59.0)	14.2 (57.6)	7.6 (45.7)	4.8 (40.6)	0.5 (32.9)	−0.9 (30.4)	0.0 (32.0)	3.2 (37.8)	7.4 (45.3)	11.3 (52.3)	14.3 (57.7)	−6.3 (20.7)
Average precipitation mm (inches)	307.8 (12.12)	351.7 (13.85)	209.8 (8.26)	115.5 (4.55)	65.3 (2.57)	36.3 (1.43)	26.7 (1.05)	25.6 (1.01)	18.0 (0.71)	40.8 (1.61)	80.5 (3.17)	179.7 (7.07)	1,468.4 (57.81)
Average precipitation days (≥ 1.0 mm)	10.5	12.1	9.8	7.9	6.2	3.6	2.6	2.3	2.3	3.7	5.2	8.0	74.2
Average afternoon relative humidity (%)	63	68	63	62	60	58	53	51	49	51	52	58	57
Average dew point °C (°F)	21.6 (70.9)	22.5 (72.5)	20.9 (69.6)	19.0 (66.2)	16.5 (61.7)	13.9 (57.0)	12.3 (54.1)	12.5 (54.5)	14.4 (57.9)	16.5 (61.7)	18.1 (64.6)	20.2 (68.4)	17.4 (63.3)
Source: Bureau of Meteorology (1978-2025 data)

== Notable people ==
- Paul Bowman, Australian professional rugby league player, Queensland Origin representative and former captain of the North Queensland Cowboys.
- Alan Dufty, Australian former professional wheelchair racer.
- Sam Faust, Australian professional rugby league player.
- Andrew Fraser, Queensland State Politician.
- Max Grosskreutz, Australian speedway rider.
- Billy Sing, Australian sniper during the Gallipoli Campaign of World War I
- Travis Waddell, Australian professional rugby league footballer, plays for Newcastle Knights

== See also ==
- List of tramways in Queensland
