= Shire of Whitsunday =

- Local government area
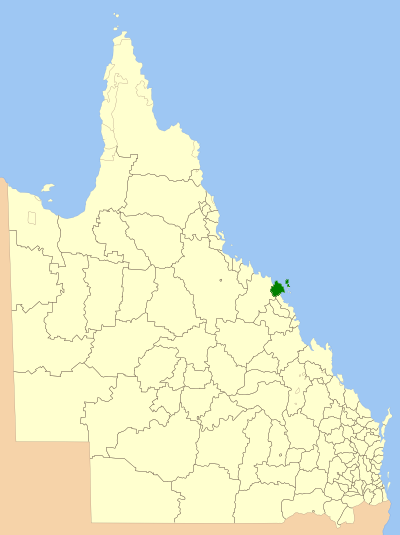
- Location within Queensland

- Country: Australia
- State: Queensland
- Region: North Queensland
- Established: 1910
- Council seat: Proserpine

Area
  - Total: 2,678.3 km^{2} (1,034.1 sq mi)

Population
  - Total: 16,955 (2006 census)
  - Density: 6.33051/km^{2} (16.3959/sq mi)
LGAs around Shire of Whitsunday
Bowen	Coral Sea	Coral Sea
Bowen	Shire of Whitsunday	Coral Sea
Bowen	Mirani	Mackay

The Shire of Whitsunday was a local government area located in the North Queensland region of Queensland, Australia. The shire, administered from the town of Proserpine, covered an area of 2,678.3 square kilometres (1,034.1 sq mi), and existed as a local government entity from 1910 until 2008, when it amalgamated with the Shire of Bowen to form the Whitsunday Region.

The area's economy is mainly based on tourism, and sugar is the main agricultural product.

== History ==
The Shire of Proserpine was established from part of the Shire of Wangaratta on 19 January 1910 under the Local Authorities Act 1902.

On 18 February 1989, the Shire of Proserpine was renamed Shire of Whitsunday due to its inclusion of the popular Whitsunday Islands.

On 15 March 2008, under the Local Government (Reform Implementation) Act 2007 passed by the Parliament of Queensland on 10 August 2007, the Shire of Whitsunday reunited with the Shire of Bowen to form the Whitsunday Region.

== Towns and localities ==
The Shire of Whitsunday included the following settlements:

- Proserpine
- Airlie Beach
- Andromache
- Brandy Creek
- Breadalbane
- Cannon Valley
- Cannonvale
- Cape Conway
- Cape Gloucester
- Conway
- Conway Beach
- Crystal Brook
- Daydream Island
- Dingo Beach
- Dittmer
- Flametree
- Foxdale
- Glen Isla
- Gloucester Island
- Goorganga Creek
- Goorganga Plains
- Gregory River
- Gunyarra
- Hamilton Island
- Hamilton Plains
- Hayman Island
- Hideaway Bay
- Jubilee Pocket
- Kelsey Creek
- Laguna Quays
- Lake Proserpine
- Lethebrook
- Mandalay
- Mount Julian
- Mount Marlow
- Mount Pluto
- Mount Rooper
- Myrtlevale
- Palm Grove
- Pauls Pocket
- Preston
- Riordanvale
- Shute Harbour
- Silver Creek
- Strathdickie
- Sugarloaf
- Thoopara
- Wilson Beach
- Woodwark

== Chairmen ==
- 1927: John Charles Edwards

== Population ==
Year	Population
1933	3,934
1947	3,617
1954	4,576
1961	5,113
1966	6,274
1971	6,420
1976	7,746
1981	10,833
1986	11,581
1991	15,227
1996	16,791
2001	18,323
2006	21,533

== See also ==
- Whitsunday
