= Whitsunday Transit =

Australian bus operator

- Parent: Colin Crossley
- Headquarters: Proserpine
- Service area: Whitsunday Region
- Service type: Bus & coach operator
- Depots: 2
- Fleet: 40 (December 2022)
- Website: www.whitsundaytransit.com.au

Whitsunday Transit is an Australian bus and coach operator services in the Whitsunday Region. It operates 1 service under contract to the Queensland Government under the Translink banner.

== History ==
Whitsunday Transit for formed by Sydney bus proprietor Colin Crossley in 1998, after he purchased Sampson's Buses from founder George Sampson and the Proserpine-based company Daly's Bus Service.

== Services ==
Whitsunday Transit operates services from Proserpine to Shute Harbour via Airlie Beach.

It also operates a service from Proserpine station to Shute Harbour that connects with Traveltrain's Spirit of Queensland service which is not operated under the Translink banner.

Route	From	To	Via
860	Proserpine	Shute Harbour	Airlie Beach, Whitsunday Plaza, Cannonvale

== Fleet ==
As at December 2022, the fleet composed of 40 buses and coaches. Under Sampson ownership, fleet livery was cream offset by blue and red. When Colin Crossley purchased the business, he introduced the two blue and yellow carried by his Sydney operation. In 1998, a blue waves livery was introduced. This later gave way to a predominantly white livery.
