= Proserpine–Shute Harbour Road =

Road in Queensland, Australia

Proserpine–Shute Harbour Road Queensland

General information
- Type: Road
- Length: 34.3 km (21 mi)
- Route number(s): (Hamilton Plains – Shute Harbour)

Major junctions
- South-west end: Bruce Highway Hamilton Plains
- Strathdickie Road; Conway Road; Gregory–Cannon Valley Road; Riordanvale Road
- North-east end: Whitsunday Drive Shute Harbour

Location(s)
- Major suburbs: Cannonvale, Airlie Beach

Proserpine–Shute Harbour Road is a continuous 34.3 kilometres (21.3 mi) road route in the Whitsunday local government area of Queensland, Australia. The route is designated as State Route 59. It is a state-controlled regional road (number 851).

== Route description ==
Proserpine–Shute Harbour Road commences as State Route 59 at an intersection with the Bruce Highway in Hamilton Plains, just north of Proserpine. Known as Shute Harbour Road, it runs north until it reaches an intersection with Strathdickie Road, where it turns east. It enters Mount Julian, crosses to the east, and turns north along the boundary with Preston, passing the exit to Conway Road before entering Mount Marlow. It continues north and then turns east along the boundary with Cannon Valley. Next it turns north-east through Cannon Valley, passing the exits to Gregory–Cannon Valley Road (see below) and Riordanvale Road before entering Cannonvale.

The road continues generally north-east through residential and industrial areas of Cannonvale as it approaches Airlie Beach, where it follows a winding course which includes a bypass of part of the original road by State Route 59. At an intersection with Waterson Way, Proserpine-Shute Harbour Road (Main Street) becomes a no through road and State Route 59 turns south and then north-east on Waterson Way. At the end of Waterson Way, State Route 59 turns south-east on the continuation of Proserpine-Shute Harbour Road.

Leaving Airlie Beach the road follows a winding, generally easterly course through Jubilee Pocket, Mandalay, Flametree and Mount Rooper before reaching Shute Harbour, where it ends at an intersection with Whitsunday Drive.

Land use along the road is mainly rural, with residential and industrial developments in Cannonvale, Airlie Beach and Jubilee Pocket. Whitsunday Airport is beside the road in the locality of Flametree.

== Road condition ==
The road is fully sealed, with a short section of four-lane dual carriageway through Cannonvale. A project to duplicate a further section of the road in Cannonvale, at a cost of $31.6 million, was to start construction in mid 2022.

A project, under the Roads of Strategic Importance initiative of the Australian Government, to upgrade the section of road between the Bruce Highway and Strathdickie Road, at a cost of $37 million, is scheduled for completion by early 2024.

== History ==
Proserpine pastoral lease was established in the early 1860s. Other large properties were soon established in the surrounding area. Sugar cane was grown from the 1880s.

In 1892 the first school in the Cannon Valley / Cannonvale area was opened to serve the local farming community. Town alottments near the beach in what is now Cannonvale were sold by public auction in 1904.

A new subdivision on the coast was named Airlie in 1935. It subsequently became Airlie Beach. In 1960 a town named Shutehaven was established to provide a port for tourism transport to offshore islands. This subsequently became Shute Harbour.

== Gregory–Cannon Valley Road ==
Gregory–Cannon Valley Road
- Location: Proserpine–Shute Harbour Road, Cannon Valley to Bruce Highway, Gregory River
- Length: 14.1 km (8.8 mi)

Gregory–Cannon Valley Road is a state-controlled district road (number 8501) rated as a local road of regional significance (LRRS). It runs west and north-west from Proserpine–Shute Harbour Road in Cannon Valley to the locality of Gregory River, where it joins the Bruce Highway, a distance of 14.1 kilometres (8.8 mi). There are no major intersections on this road. It is part of the shortest route from Bowen to Airlie Beach and Shute Harbour.

== Major intersections ==
All distances are from Google Maps. The entire road is within the Whitsunday local government area.

Location	km	mi	Destinations	Notes
Hamilton Plains	0	0.0	Bruce Highway – northwest – Bowen – south – Proserpine	South western end of Proserpine–Shute Harbour Road (State Route 59); Road continues north as Shute Harbour Road.
Hamilton Plains	1.4	0.87	Strathdickie Road – north – Strathdickie	Road turns east.
Mount Julian / Preston midpoint	5.5	3.4	Conway Road – southeast – Conway, Conway Beach	Road continues north.
Cannon Valley	13.4	8.3	Gregory–Cannon Valley Road – west, then northwest – Strathdickie, Gregory River, Bruce Highway.	Road continues north-east.
Cannon Valley	15.3	9.5	Riordanvale Road – north – Riordanvale	Road continues north-east.
Airlie Beach	23.2	14.4	Proserpine–Shute Harbour Road (Main Street) (no through road) – southeast – Airlie Beach CBD; Waterson Way – south, then northeast – Airlie Beach eastern end.	State Route 59 follows Waterson Way, bypassing the CBD.
Airlie Beach	24.4	15.2	Proserpine–Shute Harbour Road – southeast – Jubilee Pocket.	State Route 59 returns to Proserpine–Shute Harbour Road.
Shute Harbour	34.3	21.3	Whitsunday Drive – south – Shute Harbour village.	North eastern end of Proserpine–Shute Harbour Road and State Route 59.
1.000 mi = 1.609 km; 1.000 km = 0.621 mi: Route transition

== See also ==
- List of road routes in Queensland
- List of numbered roads in Queensland
