= Proserpine railway station =

Railway station in Queensland, Australia

Proserpine
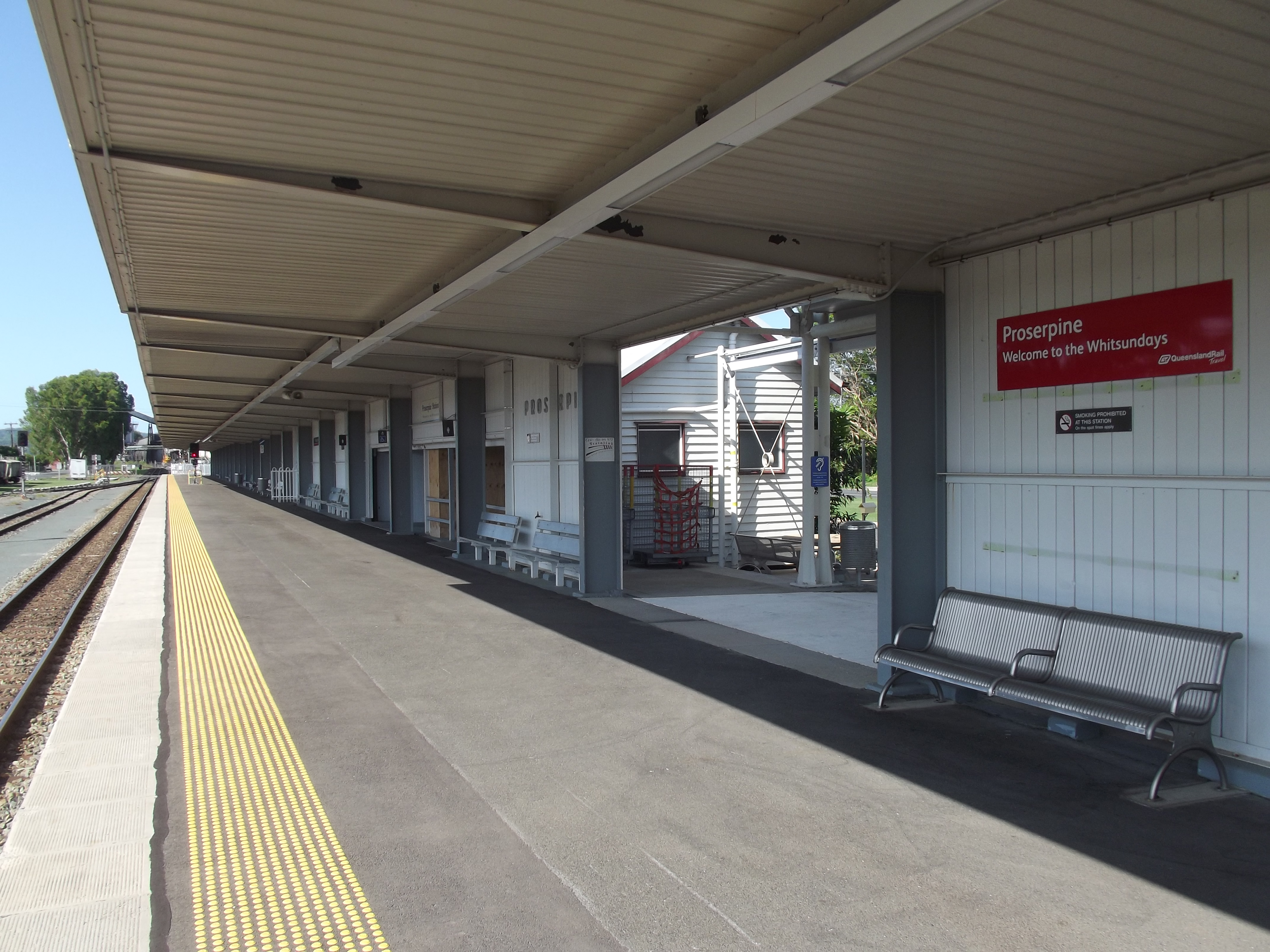
- Northbound view in January 2013

General information
- Location: 8 Hinschen Street, Proserpine
- Coordinates: 20.4029°S 148.5787°E
- Owner: Queensland Rail
- Operator: Traveltrain
- Line: North Coast
- Distance: 1084.26 kilometres from Central
- Platforms: 1
- Tracks: 2

Construction
- Structure type: Ground
- Accessible: Yes

Services
Preceding station	Queensland Rail	Following station
Mackay towards Brisbane	Spirit of Queensland	Bowen towards Cairns
Location

Proserpine railway station is located on the North Coast line in Queensland, Australia. It serves the town of Proserpine. The station has one platform. Opposite lies a passing loop.

== History ==
In 1908, a petition was signed by 306 ratepayers of the Bowen-Proserpine district, and presented to the Queensland Parliament pushing for the construction of a ‘tramway’ or ‘light railway’ to help open up the district for settlement. The agreement worked out between the two councils of Bowen and Proserpine, was to have a shared responsibility to build and operate the tramway. Construction was underway by the beginning of 1909. Prior to completion, there was a move to transfer construction out of the hands of the local authorities. However, the Government chose not to enter the argument, and the railway between Don (which was a mile from Bowen) and Proserpine opened to traffic on 11 July 1910. There was an official opening of sorts on 2 July 1910, when the Governor of Queensland, Sir William MacGregor was visiting the Proserpine Show. By all accounts, it was a happy event for all concerned. The first timetable had three trains a week running from Bowen. They took three hours to complete the journey.

It was a reasonably rustic railway that greeted the ratepayers of the Bowen Proserpine Joint Tramway Board in 1909. A locomotive with an interesting, (if not ancient), railway pedigree was purchased to operate on the line. The locomotive was purchased from Queensland Railways’ Bowen Railway in 1909, at a princely sum of £600.00. A small ‘Mogul’ (2-6-0 wheel arrangement), built by the Baldwin locomotive company of Philadelphia had arrived in Queensland in 1879. Known firstly as GNR (Great Northern Railway) No. 1, it began life in Townsville. In 1884, it went north as a construction locomotive on the Cooktown Railway. After that it was back to Townsville. Then in 1890, it went to Bowen where it became No. 2 on the Bowen Railway. The little locomotive was described as being a ‘teakettle’, but, in its fussy little way did a good service for many years. In 1911 it was bought back by Queensland Railways, but it wasn’t until 1917 that the ‘tramway’ became a fully-fledged concern as part of the ‘bigger’ Queensland Railways.

The tramway ‘officially’ opened on 11 July 1910 and was purchased by Queensland Railways on 1 July 1917 to become part of the North Coast Railway which was then under construction. The opening through to Proserpine, (officially) on 1 December 1923, linked Brisbane and Townsville.

== Services ==
Proserpine is served by Traveltrain's Spirit of Queensland service.

A connecting road coach service operated by Whitsunday Transit also operates to Airlie Beach and Shute Harbour.
