= Mount Pluto =

Mount Pluto may refer to:

- Mount Pluto, Queensland, a locality in Whitsunday Region, Australia
- Mount Pluto, California, a volcano in the Granite Chief Range near Lake Tahoe, California, United States
