= Flametree, Queensland =

Flametree
- Suburb
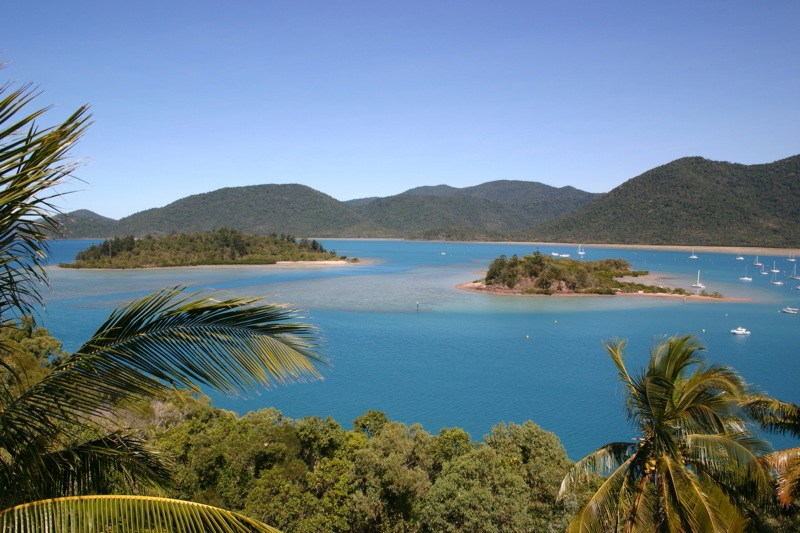
- Flametree, 2004

- Interactive map of Flametree
- Coordinates: 20.2708°S 148.7483°E
- Country: Australia
- State: Queensland
- LGA: Whitsunday Region
- Location: 8.8 km (5.5 mi) E of Cannonvale; 31.0 km (19.3 mi) NW of Proserpine; 279 km (173 mi) SW of Townsville; 1,132 km (703 mi) NNW of Brisbane

Government
  - State electorate: Whitsunday
  - Federal division: Dawson

Area
  - Total: 2.8 km^{2} (1.1 sq mi)

Population
  - Total: 143 (2021 census)
  - Density: 51.1/km^{2} (132.3/sq mi)
- Time zone: UTC+10:00 (AEST)
- Postcode: 4802
Suburbs around Flametree
Mandalay	Coral Sea	Mount Rooper
Mandalay	Flametree	Mount Rooper
Mandalay	Cape Conway	Mount Rooper

Flametree is a coastal locality in the Whitsunday Region, Queensland, Australia. In the 2021 census, Flametree had a population of 143 people.

== Geography ==
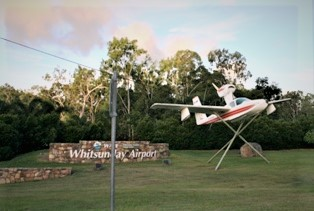
Whitsunday Airport at Flametree

Although mountainous in most parts, Flametree has a narrow, relatively flat valley which is used for the Whitsunday Airport (20.2773°S 148.7555°E), not to be confused with the larger Whitsunday Coast Airport at Proserpine.

The locality is presumably named after Flame Tree Creek (formerly Adder Creek) which flows from the south-west of the locality to the north-east of the locality where there is a small sandy north-facing beach on Pioneer Bay.

The north-west of the locality is part of Conway National Park.

Proserpine-Shute Harbour Road passes through the locality connecting from the Bruce Highway near Proserpine through to Shute Harbour.

== History ==
Flametree comprises part of the former locality of Jubilee.

== Demographics ==
In the 2016 census, Flametree had a population of 122 people.

In the 2021 census, Flametree had a population of 143 people.

== Education ==
There are no schools in Flametree. The nearest government primary school is Cannonvale State School in Cannonvale to the west. The nearest government secondary school is Proserpine State High School in Proserpine to the south-west.
