= Whitsunday, Queensland =

Whitsunday Queensland
- Coordinates: 20.28°S 148.7261°E
- Postcode(s): 4802
- Time zone: AEST (UTC+10:00)
- Location: 5.2 km (3 mi) E of Cannonvale; 27.4 km (17 mi) NE of Proserpine; 152 km (94 mi) N of Mackay; 276 km (171 mi) SE of Townsville; 1,122 km (697 mi) NNW of Brisbane
- LGA(s): Whitsunday Region
- State electorate(s): Whitsunday
- Federal division(s): Dawson

Whitsunday is a coastal town in the locality of Airlie Beach in the Whitsunday Region, Queensland, Australia.

== History ==
The town takes its name from the Whitsunday Passage which was named on 4 June 1770 by Lieutenant James Cook of HMS Endeavour because it was religious festival of Whitsun. On 31 January 1987, the town was created to encompass the whole of the urbanised area around the Whitsunday Coast, replacing the separate towns of Airlie (within the locality of Airlie Beach), Cannonvale (within the locality of the same name) and Shutehaven (within the locality of Shute Harbour) in addition to the locality of Jubilee (now Jubilee Pocket).

== Education ==
There are no schools in Whitsunday. The nearest government primary school is Cannonvale State School in Cannonvale to the west. The nearest government secondary school is Proserpine State High School in Proserpine to the south-west.
