= WSY =

WSY may refer to:

- WSY, the former call sign for WAPI (AM) in Birmingham, Alabama
- WSY, the IATA code for Whitsunday Airport, Queensland, Australia
