= Mount Rooper, Queensland =

Mount Rooper
- Suburb
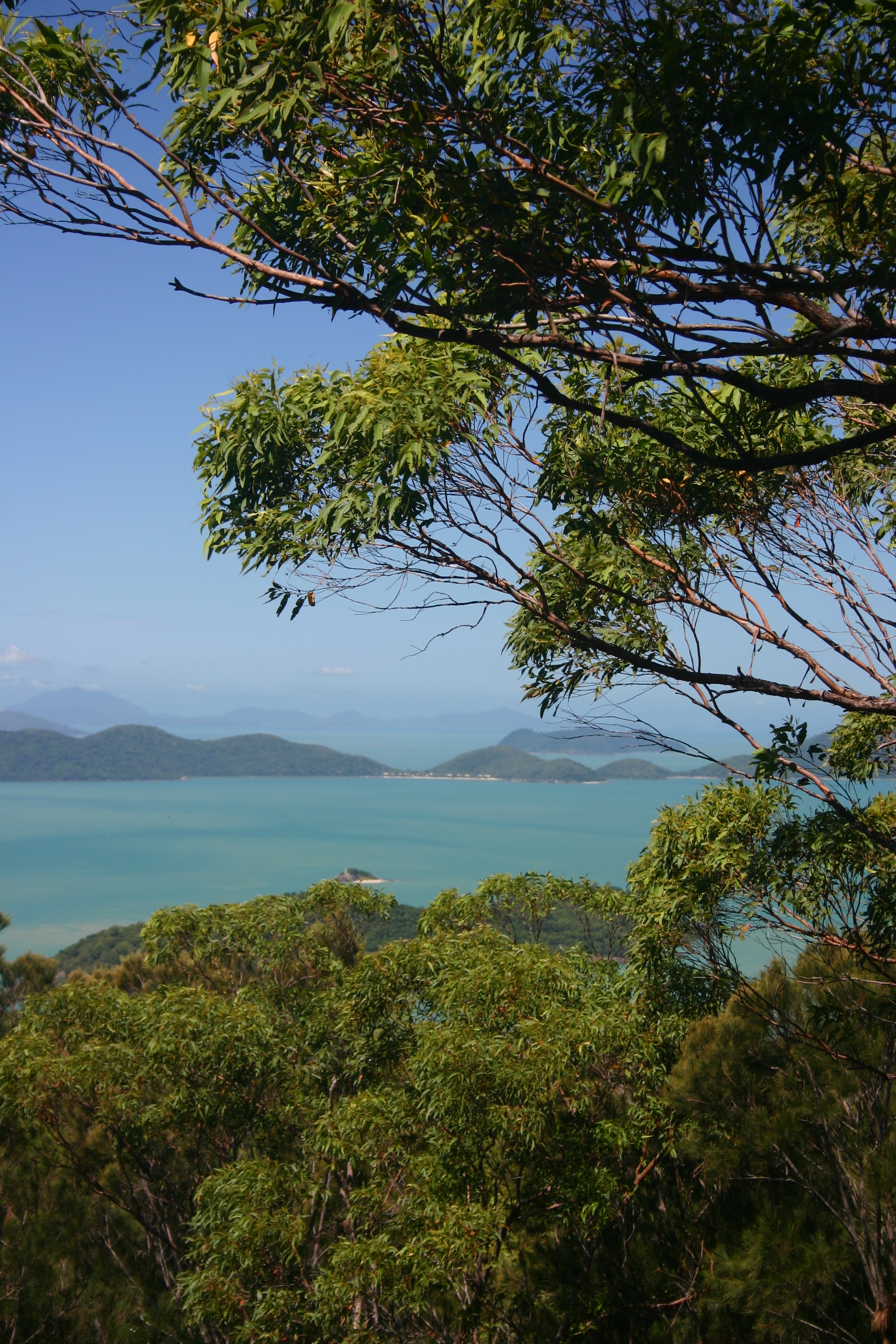
- Looking across the Conway National Park towards Long Island from the Mount Rooper Lookout, 2008

- Interactive map of Mount Rooper
- Coordinates: 20.2711°S 148.7677°E
- Country: Australia
- State: Queensland
- LGA: Whitsunday Region
- Location: 9.7 km (6.0 mi) E of Cannonvale; 32.5 km (20.2 mi) NW of Proserpine; 282 km (175 mi) SE of Townsville; 1,103 km (685 mi) NNW of Brisbane

Government
  - State electorate: Whitsunday
  - Federal division: Dawson

Area
  - Total: 15.8 km^{2} (6.1 sq mi)

Population
  - Total: 0 (2021 census)
  - Density: 0.00/km^{2} (0.00/sq mi)
- Postcode: 4802
Suburbs around Mount Rooper
Coral Sea	Coral Sea	Coral Sea
Flametree	Mount Rooper	Coral Sea
Cape Conway	Coral Sea	Shute Harbour

Mount Rooper is a coastal locality in the Whitsunday Region, Queensland, Australia. In the 2021 census, Mount Rooper had "no people or a very low population".

== Geography ==
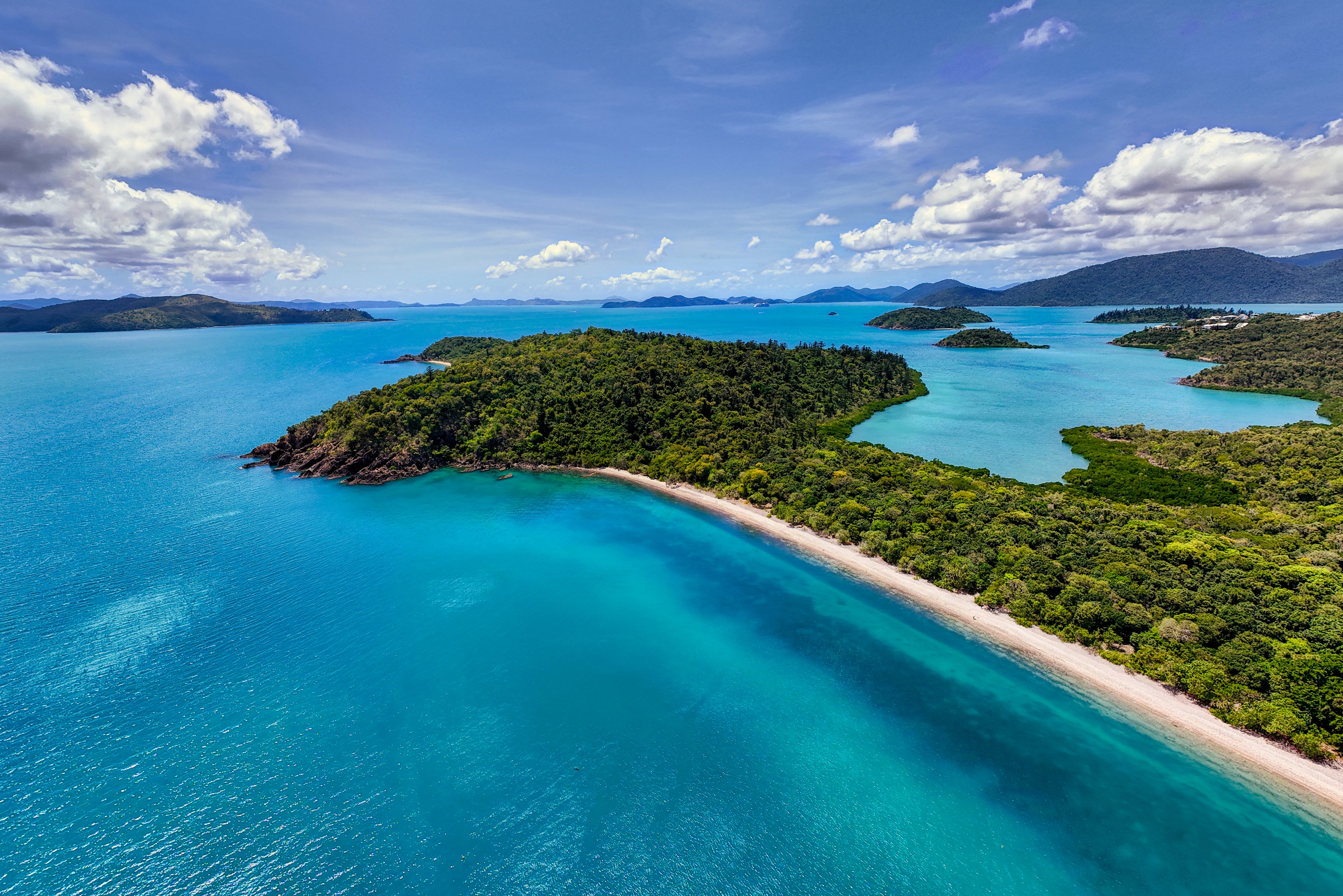
The Beak Lookout area

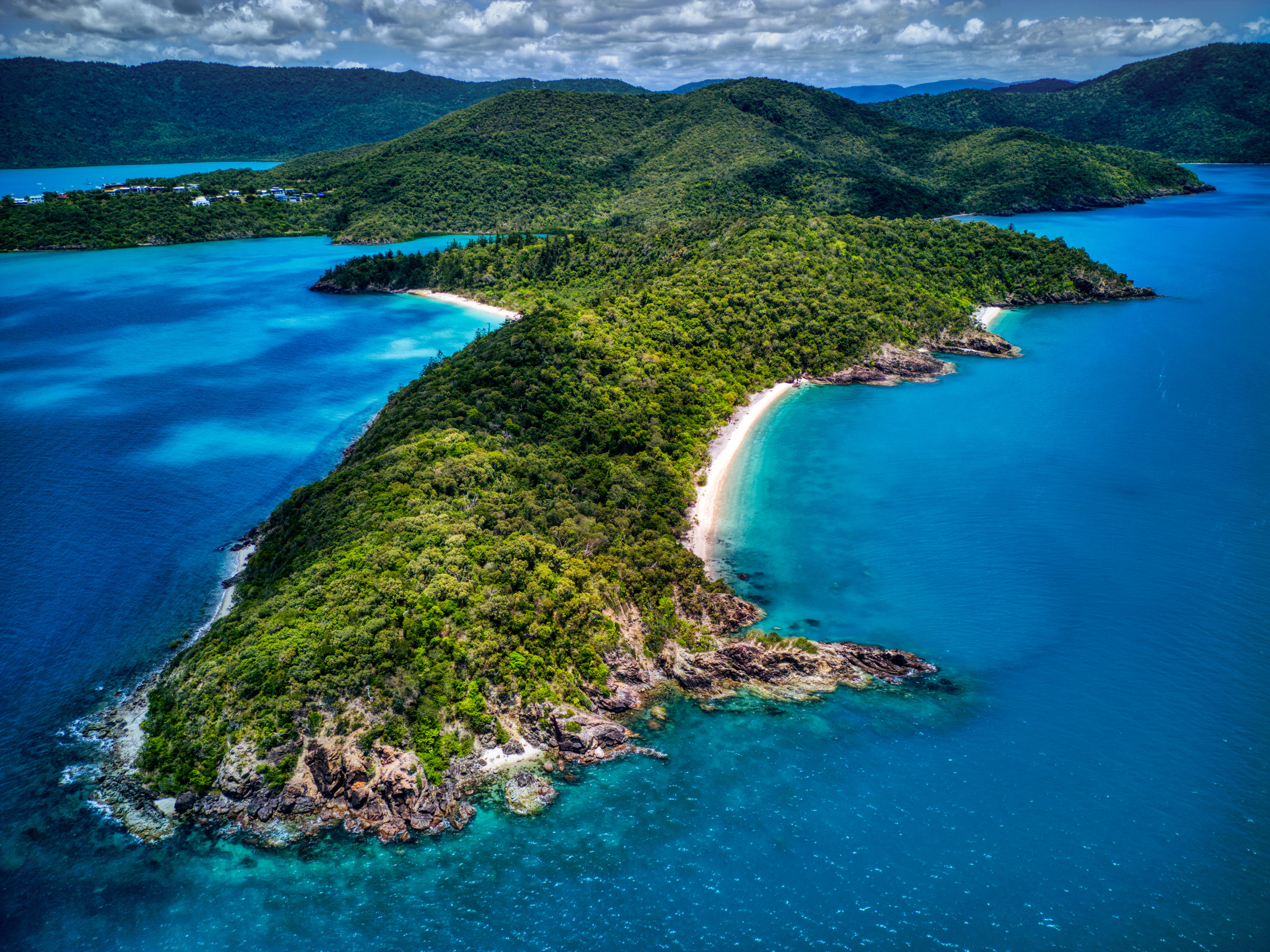
The Beak Lookout area

Mount Rooper is a mountainous headland with three main peaks which are (from north to south) Notch Hill, Mount Merkara, and Mount Rooper (221 metres). Notch Hill is 347 metres (1,138 ft) high and was named in May 1881 by Captain John Fiot Lee Pearse Maclear (Royal Navy) of HMS Alert because, when viewed from the east, the peak appears to have a notch. Mount Merkara is 373 metres (1,224 ft) and was also named by Maclear in May 1881 after the RMS Merkara which they met on its first voyage as part of the Queensland Royal Mail Line between Australia and London. The mountain Mount Rooper is 221 metres (725 ft) and named in 1932 by Lieutenant Commander C.G. Little (Royal Australian Navy) during a survey. Little named the mountain after the Rooper Inlet which it overlooks to the south (near present-day Shute Harbour), which was in turn named by Maclear in May 1881 after Lieutenant Henry E. Rooper on HMS Alert.

All of the locality is a protected area, mostly within Conway National Park except for the south-eastern area which is in Conway Conservation Park.

Proserpine-Shute Harbour Road follows the south-western boundary of the locality providing access to Shute Harbour on the southern side of the headland.

== History ==
Mount Rooper comprises part of the former locality of Jubilee.

== Demographics ==
In the 2016 census, Mount Rooper had "no people or a very low population".

In the 2021 census, Mount Rooper had "no people or a very low population".
