= Whitsunday Airport =

Whitsunday Airport (Shute Harbour)
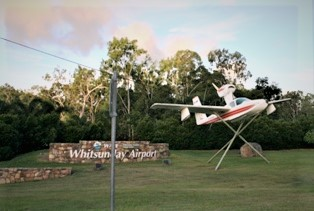
- IATA: WSY; ICAO: YSHR

Summary
- Airport type: Private
- Owner: Ross Armstrong
- Operator: Whitsunday Airport
- Location: Flametree, near Shute Harbour & Airlie Beach, Queensland, Australia
- Elevation AMSL: 40 ft / 12 m
- Coordinates: 20°16′36″S 148°45′19″E
- Website: www.whitsundayairport.com.au

Map
- Location in Queensland

Runways
Direction	Length		Surface
Direction	m	ft	Surface
14/32	1,410	4,626	Asphalt
- Sources: AIP ERAS, airport website

Whitsunday Airport (Shute Harbour) (IATA: WSY, ICAO: YSHR) is located in Flametree in the Whitsunday Region, Queensland, Australia. It is located between the popular tourist destinations of Airlie Beach, Shute Harbour and the Whitsunday Islands.

The airport's runway has a 1,410-by-20-metre (4,626 ft × 66 ft) asphalt surface. The elevation is 40 to 60 feet (12 to 18 m).

== See also ==
- List of airports in Queensland
