= Mandalay, Queensland =

Mandalay
- Suburb
- Interactive map of Mandalay
- Coordinates: 20.2730°S 148.7361°E
- Country: Australia
- State: Queensland
- LGA: Whitsunday Region
- Location: 6.9 km (4.3 mi) E of Cannonvale; 29.1 km (18.1 mi) NW of Proserpine; 277 km (172 mi) SE of Townsville; 1,126 km (700 mi) NNW of Brisbane

Government
  - State electorate: Whitsunday
  - Federal division: Dawson

Area
  - Total: 3.2 km^{2} (1.2 sq mi)

Population
  - Total: 338 (2021 census)
  - Density: 105.6/km^{2} (274/sq mi)
- Time zone: UTC+10:00 (AEST)
- Postcode: 4802
Suburbs around Mandalay
Coral Sea	Coral Sea	Flametree
Airlie Beach	Mandalay	Flametree
Jubilee Pocket	Cape Conway	Cape Conway

Mandalay is a coastal locality in the Whitsunday Region, Queensland, Australia. In the 2021 census, Mandalay had a population of 338 people.

== Geography ==
The locality is bounded to the north and west by the Coral Sea, specifically by Pioneer Bay (20.2455°S 148.7108°E) to the north and north-west and Port of Airlie (20.2702°S 148.7292°E) and Boat Haven (20.2697°S 148.7286°E) both to the west.

Shute Harbour Road forms the southern boundary of the locality.

Mandalay Point is a headland at the north of the locality (20.2539°S 148.7344°E).

Mandalay is mostly mountainous undeveloped terrain except for low-lying marshland in the south-west of the locality. The residential development is predominantly in the lowland area or along the north-west coast accessed via Mandalay Road. The northernmost and southernmost parts of the locality are within the Conway National Park.

The Proserpine–Shute Harbour Road (State Route 59) passes through the locality from south to east.

== History ==
Mandalay comprises part of the former locality of Jubilee. The name Mandalay presumably derives from the name of its northern headland Mandalay Point, which in turn is believed to be named by George Sax who resided at the point for about ten years from 1937.

== Demographics ==
In the 2016 census, Mandalay had a population of 337 people.

In the 2021 census, Mandalay had a population of 338 people.

== Education ==
There are no schools in Mandalay. The nearest government primary school is Cannonvale State School in Cannonvale to the west. The nearest government secondary school is Proserpine State High School in Proserpine to the south-west.

== Amenities ==
The Whitsunday Sports Park (also known as the Airlie Sports Park) is in the most western part of the locality on Shute Harbour Road. It has a rectangular and an oval field, netball courts and two clubhouses. It is home to clubs of various codes of football, netball and softball.
