= Crystal Brook, Queensland =

Crystal Brook
- Suburb
- Interactive map of Crystal Brook
- Coordinates: 20.3783°S 148.4808°E
- Country: Australia
- State: Queensland
- LGA: Whitsunday Region
- Location: 23.4 km (14.5 mi) W of Proserpine; 149 km (93 mi) NW of Mackay; 285 km (177 mi) SE of Townsville; 1,121 km (697 mi) NNW of Brisbane

Government
  - State electorate: Whitsunday
  - Federal division: Dawson

Area
  - Total: 82.3 km^{2} (31.8 sq mi)

Population
  - Total: 237 (2021 census)
  - Density: 2.880/km^{2} (7.458/sq mi)
- Time zone: UTC+10:00 (AEST)
- Postcode: 4800
Suburbs around Crystal Brook
Mount Pluto	Foxdale	Foxdale
Lake Proserpine	Crystal Brook	Hamilton Plains
Dittmer	Kelsey Creek	Proserpine

Crystal Brook is a rural locality in the Whitsunday Region, Queensland, Australia. In the 2021 census, Crystal Brook had a population of 237 people.

== Demographics ==
In the 2016 census, Crystal Brook had a population of 183 people.

In the 2021 census, Crystal Brook had a population of 237 people.

== Education ==
There are no schools in Crystal Brook. The nearest government primary and secondary schools are Proserpine State School and Proserpine State High School, both in Proserpine to the south-east. There is also a Catholic school in Proserpine.
