= Brandy Creek, Queensland =

Rural locality in Queensland, Australia

Brandy Creek
- Suburb
- Interactive map of Brandy Creek
- Coordinates: 20.3344°S 148.6750°E
- Country: Australia
- State: Queensland
- LGA: Whitsunday Region
- Location: 10.4 km (6.5 mi) SSE of Cannonvale; 15.3 km (9.5 mi) NE of Proserpine; 140 km (87 mi) NNW of Mackay; 266 km (165 mi) SE of Townsville; 1,192 km (741 mi) NNW of Brisbane

Government
  - State electorate: Whitsunday
  - Federal division: Dawson

Area
  - Total: 6.3 km^{2} (2.4 sq mi)

Population
  - Total: 114 (2021 census)
  - Density: 18.10/km^{2} (46.9/sq mi)
- Time zone: UTC+10:00 (AEST)
- Postcode: 4800
Suburbs around Brandy Creek
Mount Marlow	Cape Conway	Cape Conway
Cannon Valley	Brandy Creek	Cape Conway
Cape Conway	Cape Conway	Cape Conway

Brandy Creek is a rural locality in the Whitsunday Region, Queensland, Australia. In the 2021 census, Brandy Creek had a population of 114 people.

== Geography ==
The Shute Harbour Road (State Route 59) runs along the western boundary.

== Demographics ==
In the 2016 census, Brandy Creek had a population of 117 people.

In the 2021 census, Brandy Creek had a population of 114 people.

== Education ==
There are no schools in Brandy Creek. The nearest government primary school is Cannonvale State School in Cannonvale to the north. The nearest government secondary school is Proserpine State High School in Proserpine to the south-west.
