= Cape Conway, Queensland =

Cape Conway
- Suburb
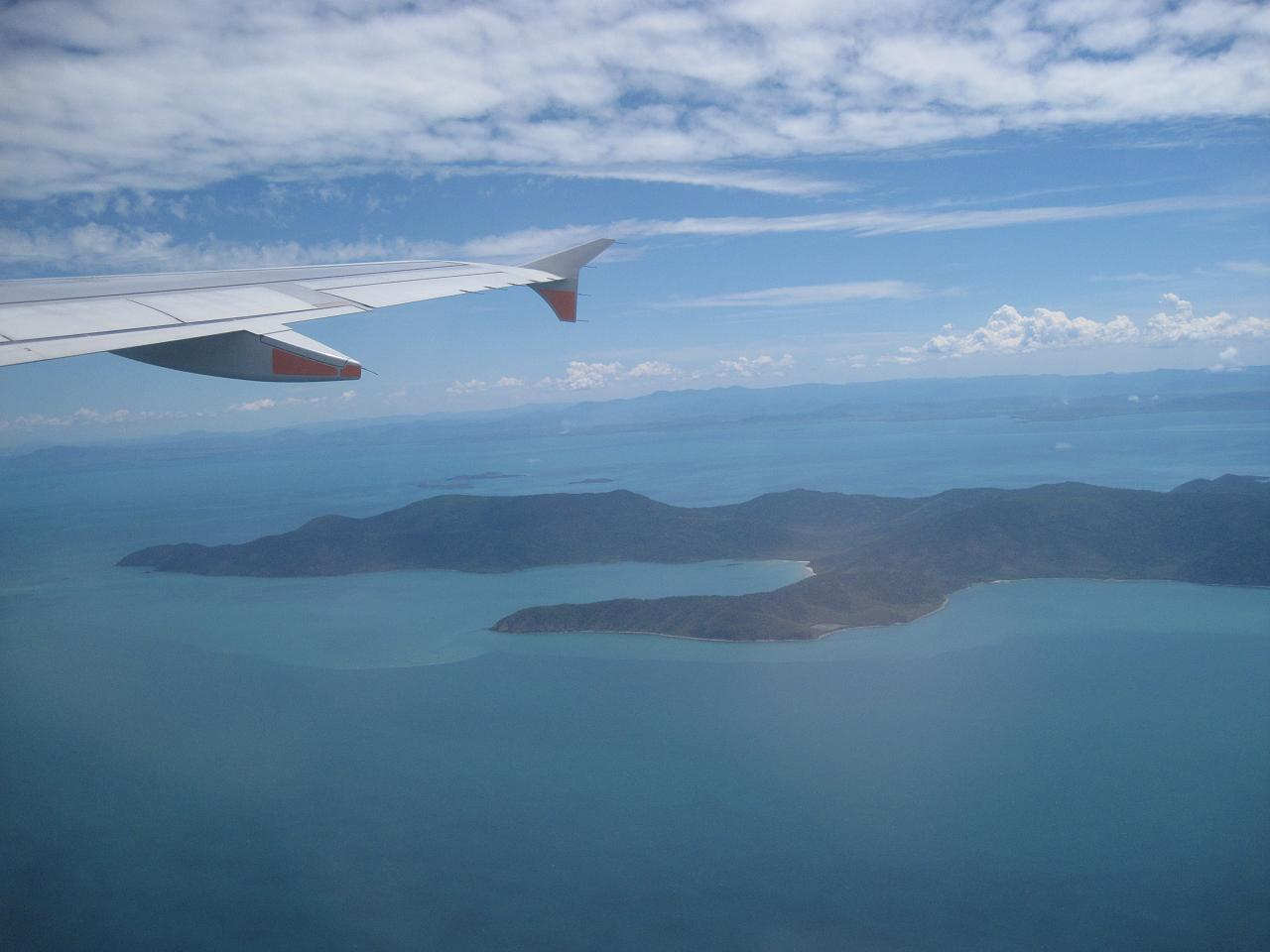
- Cape Conway (left) and Round Head (centre), looking south

- Interactive map of Cape Conway
- Coordinates: 20.3527°S 148.7497°E
- Country: Australia
- State: Queensland
- LGA: Whitsunday Region
- Location: 15.6 km (9.7 mi) S of Airlie Beach (direct); 22.5 km (14.0 mi) E of Proserpine (direct); 92.5 km (57.5 mi) NNW of Mackay (direct); 895 km (556 mi) NNW of Brisbane

Government
  - State electorate: Whitsunday
  - Federal division: Dawson

Area
  - Total: 309.1 km^{2} (119.3 sq mi)

Population
  - Total: 0 (2021 census)
  - Density: 0.0000/km^{2} (0.000/sq mi)
- Time zone: UTC+10:00 (AEST)
- Postcode: 4800
Suburbs around Cape Conway
| Cannonvale; Cannon Valley; Brandy Creek | Airlie Beach; Jubilee Pocket; Mandalay | Flametree; Mount Rooper |
| Mount Marlow; Preston; Palm Grove | Cape Conway | Whitsundays |
| Conway; Conway Beach | Coral Sea | Coral Sea |

Cape Conway is a coastal locality in the Whitsunday Region, Queensland, Australia. In the 2021 census, Cape Conway had "no people or a very low population".

== Geography ==
The land is mountainous and undeveloped bushland. The entire locality is within Conway National Park and the land use is nature conservation.

Conway Range runs along the eastern part of the locality with a number of named peaks, the highest of which is High Mountain at 555 metres (1,821 ft) above sea level. High Mountain was originally noted as High Peak on a chart by Lieutenant Francis Price Blackwood (Royal Navy) in HMS Fly in 1843.

=== Mountains ===
The locality has the following mountains, from north to south:

- The Hump (20.2928°S 148.7551°E) 329 metres (1,079 ft)
- Mount Hayward (20.3096°S 148.7577°E) 441 metres (1,447 ft)
- Mount Maclear (20.3177°S 148.7817°E) 385 metres (1,263 ft)
- Mount Conway (20.3204°S 148.7753°E) 430 metres (1,410 ft)
- Mount Sunter (20.3313°S 148.8027°E) 354 metres (1,161 ft)
- Mount Kangaroo (20.3491°S 148.8301°E) 271 metres (889 ft)
- High Mountain (20.3586°S 148.7936°E) 555 metres (1,821 ft)
- Mount Proserpine (20.4414°S 148.7181°E) 444 metres (1,457 ft)
- Little Conway (20.4590°S 148.7366°E) 344 metres (1,129 ft)

=== Coastal features ===
The locality has the following headlands, clockwise around the coast:

- Strip Point (20.321112°S 148.814728°E)
- Trammel Bay (20.3387°S 148.8195°E)
- Dugong Bay (20.3426°S 148.8196°E)
- Spit Point (20.3537°S 148.8407°E)
- Andersons Bay (20.3680°S 148.8331°E)
- Long Island Sound (20.3806°S 148.8441°E)
- Woodcutter Bay (20.3850°S 148.8296°E)
- Puritan Bay (20.4651°S 148.8803°E)
- Round Head (20.4780°S 148.9104°E)
- Genesta Bay (20.4877°S 148.8977°E)
- Cape Conway, the most south-eastern point of the locality (20.5343°S 148.9306°E)
- Rocky Point (20.4792°S 148.7640°E)
- Repulse Beach (20.4773°S 148.7635°E)
- Repulse Bay (20.550°S 148.763°E)

== History ==
The locality name derives from the geographic feature Cape Conway which was named on 3 June 1770 by Lieutenant James Cook on the HM Bark Endeavour after Henry Seymour Conway, the Secretary of State for the Southern Department from 1765 to 1766 and Secretary of State for the Northern Department from 1766 to 1768.

== Demographics ==
In the 2016 census, Cape Conway had "no people or a very low population".

In the 2021 census, Cape Conway had "no people or a very low population".

== Education ==
There are no schools in Cape Conway. The nearest government primary schools are Cannonvale State School in neighbouring Cannonvale to the north-west and Proserpine State School in Proserpine to the west. The nearest government secondary school is Proserpine State High School, also in Proserpine. There are also non-government schools in both Cannonvale and Proserpine offering primary and secondary education.

== Attractions ==
There are two lookouts in the locality:

- Mt Haywood Lookout (20.3094°S 148.7576°E)
- Honeyeater Lookout (20.2925°S 148.6974°E)
