= Myrtlevale, Queensland =

Myrtlevale
- Suburb
- Interactive map of Myrtlevale
- Coordinates: 20.3308°S 148.5502°E
- Country: Australia
- State: Queensland
- LGA: Whitsunday Region
- Location: 10.7 km (6.6 mi) N of Proserpine; 136 km (85 mi) NNW of Mackay; 253 km (157 mi) SE of Townsville; 1,107 km (688 mi) NNW of Brisbane

Government
  - State electorate: Whitsunday
  - Federal division: Dawson

Area
  - Total: 28.7 km^{2} (11.1 sq mi)

Population
  - Total: 205 (2021 census)
  - Density: 7.143/km^{2} (18.50/sq mi)
- Time zone: UTC+10:00 (AEST)
- Postcode: 4800
Suburbs around Myrtlevale
Gregory River	Gregory River	Gregory River
Foxdale	Myrtlevale	Strathdickie
Foxdale	Strathdickie	Strathdickie

Myrtlevale is a rural locality in the Whitsunday Region, Queensland, Australia. In the 2021 census, Myrtlevale had a population of 205 people.

== Geography ==
The locality is bounded to the south-west by the North Coast railway line, but there are no stations serving the locality.

The Bruce Highway (locally known as Myrtlevale Road) enters the locality from the south (Foxdale), slightly east of the railway line. It continues northwards through the locality until it reaches the northern boundary of the locality, where it turns to the west and forms part of the northern boundary until the north-west corner of the locality where it exits to the north-west (Gregory River).

A discontiguous section of the Conway National Park is in the north-east of the locality. Apart from this protected area, the land use is predominantly growing sugarcane with some grazing on native vegetation.

There is a network of cane tramways to transport the harvested sugarcane to the local sugar mill.

== Demographics ==
In the 2016 census, Myrtlevale had a population of 161 people.

In the 2021 census, Myrtlevale had a population of 205 people.

== Education ==
There are no schools in Myrtlevale. The nearest government primary and secondary schools are Proserpine State School and Proserpine State High School, both in Proserpine to the south.
