= Mount Marlow, Queensland =

Mount Marlow
- Suburb
- Interactive map of Mount Marlow
- Coordinates: 20.3527°S 148.6297°E
- Country: Australia
- State: Queensland
- LGA: Whitsunday Region
- Location: 12.3 km (7.6 mi) NE of Proserpine; 12.7 km (7.9 mi) SW of Cannonvale; 137 km (85 mi) NNW of Mackay; 1,086 km (675 mi) NNW of Brisbane

Government
  - State electorate: Whitsunday
  - Federal division: Dawson

Area
  - Total: 8.6 km^{2} (3.3 sq mi)

Population
  - Total: 161 (2021 census)
  - Density: 18.72/km^{2} (48.5/sq mi)
- Time zone: UTC+10:00 (AEST)
- Postcode: 4800
Suburbs around Mount Marlow
Strathdickie	Cannon Valley	Brandy Creek
Strathdickie	Mount Marlow	Cape Conway
Mount Julian	Preston	Preston

Mount Marlow is a rural locality in the Whitsunday Region, Queensland, Australia. In the 2021 census, Mount Marlow had a population of 161 people.

== Geography ==
Mount Marlow (20.3537°S 148.6396°E) rises to 354 metres (1,161 ft) above sea level. It is in the eastern part of the locality.

The Proserpine–Shute Harbour Road (State Route 59) passes through the locality from south to north and then runs along the northern boundary.

== History ==
Mount Marlow Provisional School opened on 1900. On 1 January 1909 it became Mount Marlow State School. It closed in 1954.

== Demographics ==
In the 2016 census, Mount Marlow had a population of 132 people.

In the 2021 census, Mount Marlow had a population of 161 people.

== Education ==
There are no schools in Mount Marlow. The nearest government primary schools are Proserpine State School in Proserpine to the south-west and Cannonvale State School in Cannonvale to the north-east. The nearest government secondary school is Proserpine State High School in Proserpine.
