= Strathdickie, Queensland =

Strathdickie
- Suburb
- Interactive map of Strathdickie
- Coordinates: 20.3316°S 148.5972°E
- Country: Australia
- State: Queensland
- LGA: Whitsunday Region
- Location: 8.9 km (5.5 mi) N of Proserpine; 134 km (83 mi) NNW of Mackay; 260 km (160 mi) SE of Townsville; 1,095 km (680 mi) NNW of Brisbane

Government
  - State electorate: Whitsunday
  - Federal division: Dawson

Area
  - Total: 36.0 km^{2} (13.9 sq mi)

Population
  - Total: 1,003 (2021 census)
  - Density: 27.86/km^{2} (72.16/sq mi)
- Time zone: UTC+10:00 (AEST)
- Postcode: 4800
Suburbs around Strathdickie
Gregory River	Gregory River	Sugarloaf
Myrtlevale	Strathdickie	Cannon Valley
Foxdale	Hamilton Plains; Mount Julian	Mount Marlow

Strathdickie is a rural locality in the Whitsunday Region, Queensland, Australia. In the 2021 census, Strathdickie had a population of 1,003 people.

== History ==
Strathdickie Provisional School opened on 25 June 1906. On 1 January 1909, it became Strathdickie State School. It closed on 1 June 1962. It was at 869-875 Gregory Cannon Valley Road (20.3284°S 148.6058°E).

== Demographics ==
In the 2016 census, Strathdickie had a population of 880 people.

In the 2021 census, Strathdickie had a population of 1,003 people.

== Education ==
There are no schools in Strathdickie. The nearest government primary schools are Proserpine State School in Proserpine to the south and Cannonvale State School in Cannonvale to the north-east. The nearest government secondary school is Proserpine State High School, also in Proserpine.
