= Jubilee Pocket, Queensland =

Jubilee Pocket
- Suburb
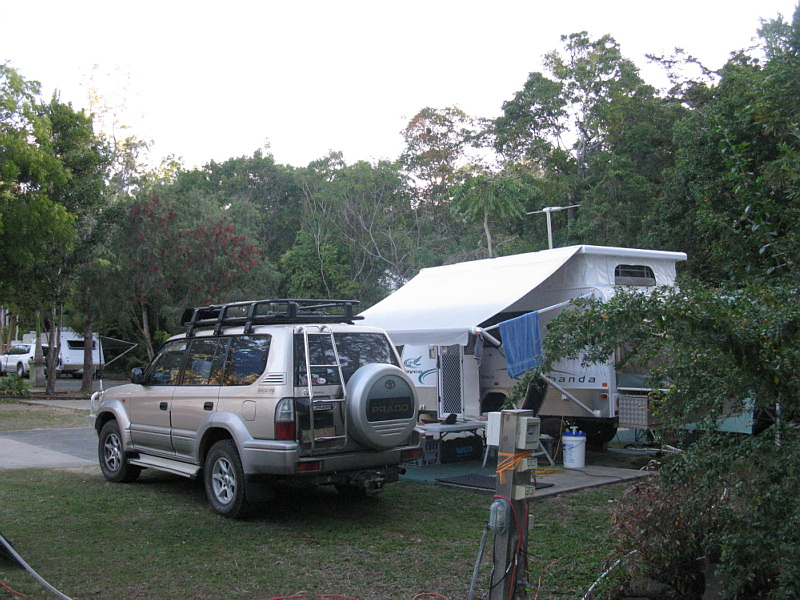
- Caravan park, Jubilee Pocket, 2009

- Interactive map of Jubilee Pocket
- Coordinates: 20.2911°S 148.7275°E
- Country: Australia
- State: Queensland
- LGA: Whitsunday Region
- Location: 5.4 km (3.4 mi) SE of Cannonvale; 27.6 km (17.1 mi) NE of Proserpine; 152 km (94 mi) N of Mackay; 276 km (171 mi) SE of Townsville; 1,124 km (698 mi) NNW of Brisbane

Government
  - State electorate: Whitsunday
  - Federal division: Dawson

Area
  - Total: 3.8 km^{2} (1.5 sq mi)
- Elevation: 10–340 m (33–1,115 ft)

Population
  - Total: 2,047 (2021 census)
  - Density: 539/km^{2} (1,395/sq mi)
- Time zone: UTC+10:00 (AEST)
- Postcode: 4802
Suburbs around Jubilee Pocket
| Airlie Beach | Mandalay | Mandalay |
| Cape Conway | Jubilee Pocket | Cape Conway |
| Cape Conway | Cape Conway | Cape Conway |

Jubilee Pocket is a residential locality in the Whitsunday Region, Queensland, Australia. In the 2021 census, Jubilee Pocket had a population of 2,047 people.

== Geography ==
The north and centre of the suburb has lower flatter land used for housing. The more mountainous land around the eastern, southern and western boundaries is undeveloped bushland.

The Proserpine–Shute Harbour Road (State Route 59) enters the locality from the north-west (Airlie Beach), forms part of the northern boundary of the suburb before passing through the locality, and exiting to the north-east (Mandalay ./ Cape Conway).

== History ==
Jubilee Pocket comprises part of the former locality of Jubilee.

== Demographics ==
In the 2016 census, Jubilee Pocket had a population of 1,817 people.

In the 2021 census, Jubilee Pocket had a population of 2,047 people.

== Education ==
There are no schools in Jubilee Pocket. The nearest government primary school is Cannonvale State School in Cannonvale to the north-west. The nearest government secondary school is Proserpine State High School in Proserpine to the south-west.

== Amenities ==
There is a caravan park and camping ground on Shute Harbour Road on the north-western edge of the locality.
