= Palm Grove, Queensland =

Palm Grove
- Suburb
- Interactive map of Palm Grove
- Coordinates: 20.3963°S 148.6969°E
- Country: Australia
- State: Queensland
- LGA: Whitsunday Region
- Location: 18.7 km (11.6 mi) E of Proserpine; 141 km (88 mi) NNW of Mackay; 280 km (170 mi) SE of Townsville; 1,105 km (687 mi) NNW of Brisbane

Government
  - State electorate: Whitsunday
  - Federal division: Dawson

Area
  - Total: 24.9 km^{2} (9.6 sq mi)

Population
  - Total: 86 (2021 census)
  - Density: 3.454/km^{2} (8.95/sq mi)
- Time zone: UTC+10:00 (AEST)
- Postcode: 4800
Suburbs around Palm Grove
Cape Conway	Cape Conway	Cape Conway
Preston	Palm Grove	Cape Conway
Preston	Conway	Cape Conway

Palm Grove is a rural locality in the Whitsunday Region, Queensland, Australia. In the 2021 census, Palm Grove had a population of 86 people.

== History ==
Palm Groves State School opened on 14 August 1916, but closed in 1918 due to low student numbers. On 27 January 1926, it reopened. In 1933, the name was changed to Palm Grove State School. It closed permanently in December 1951. It was at 287 Saltwater Creek Road (20.40534°S 148.70014°E).

== Demographics ==
In the 2016 census, Palm Grove had a population of 87 people.

In the 2021 census, Palm Grove had a population of 86 people.

== Education ==
There are no schools in Palm Grove. The nearest government primary and secondary schools are Proserpine State School and Proserpine State High School, both in Proserpine to the west.
