= Shute Harbour =

- Suburb
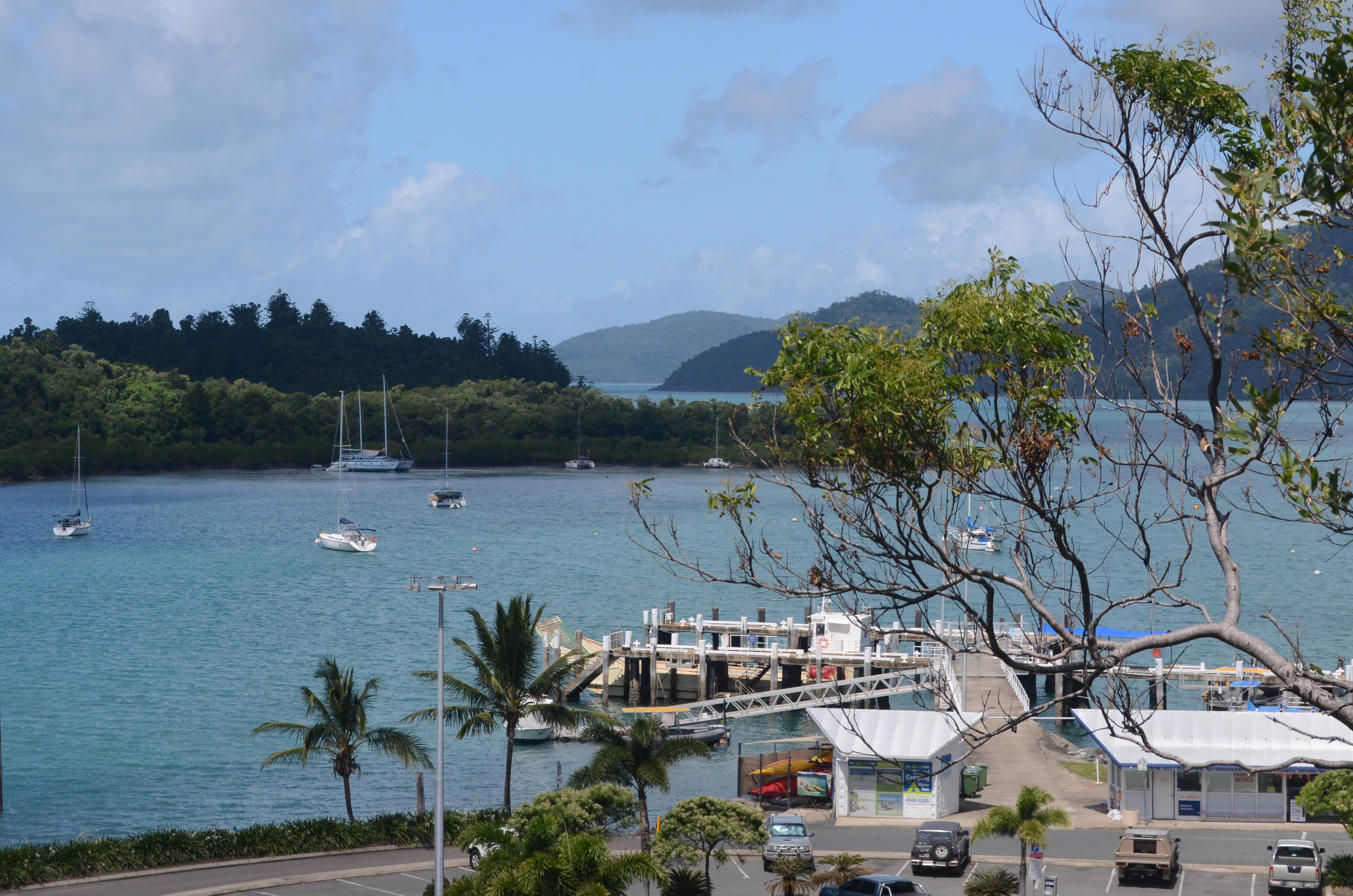
- Shute Harbour

- Interactive map of Shute Harbour
- Coordinates: 20.29°S 148.7902°E
- Country: Australia
- State: Queensland
- LGA: Whitsunday Region
- Location: 14.9 km (9.3 mi) E of Cannonvale; 37.1 km (23.1 mi) NE of Proserpine; 162 km (101 mi) N of Mackay; 285 km (177 mi) SE of Townsville; 1,138 km (707 mi) NNW of Brisbane

Government
  - State electorate: Whitsunday
  - Federal division: Dawson

Area
  - Total: 1.0 km^{2} (0.39 sq mi)

Population
  - Total: 113 (2021 census)
  - Density: 113/km^{2} (293/sq mi)
- Time zone: UTC+10:00 (AEST)
- Postcode: 4802
Suburbs around Shute Harbour
Mount Rooper	Mount Rooper	Coral Sea
Coral Sea	Shute Harbour	Coral Sea
Coral Sea	Coral Sea	Coral Sea

Shute Harbour is a coastal locality and harbour in the Whitsunday Region of Queensland, Australia. It has port facilities and transport options for people seeking to access the Whitsunday Islands and holiday destinations.

In the 2021 census, Shute Harbour had a population of 113 people.

== Geography ==
The Proserpine–Shute Harbour Road (State Route 59) enters the locality from the north-west (Mount Rooper), and terminates at the harbour carpark.

Shute Harbour has the following coastal features (from west to east):

- Shute Bay (20.2963°S 148.7769°E)
- Rooper Inlet, a bay (20.300°S 148.783°E)
- Shute Harbour (20.2907°S 148.7891°E)
- Coral Point (20.2909°S 148.7937°E)

Apart from the harbour services, the only other land use is a small residential area on the Coral Point peninsula.

== History ==
Shute Harbour takes its name from Shute Island which is about 500 metres (1,600 ft) south-east of the headland of Shute Harbour. The island was named by in May 1881 by Captain John Fiot Lee Pearse Maclear of HMS Alert, possibly after a crew-member of that ship.

When the Proserpine Shire Council decided to construct tourist facilities in the area in October 1960, they created a town called Shutehaven. On 31 January 1987, the town of Shutehaven was amalgamated into the larger town of Whitsunday.

Whitsunday Regional Council opened the renovated Shute Harbour Marine Terminal in mid December 2021. However, there were criticisms about the safety of the public boat ramp facilities, particularly that the jetty did not float but became submerged at high tide, forcing boat users to wade through water that might contain crocodiles or the dangerous Irukandji jellyfish. In August 2023, it was announced that a review of the boat ramp would be undertaken.

== Demographics ==
In the 2016 census, Shute Harbour had a population of 122 people.

In the 2021 census, Shute Harbour had a population of 113 people.

== Education ==
There are no schools in Shute Harbour. The nearest government primary school is Cannonvale State School in Cannonvale to the west. The nearest government secondary school is Proserpine State High School in Proserpine to the south-west.

== Harbour facilities ==
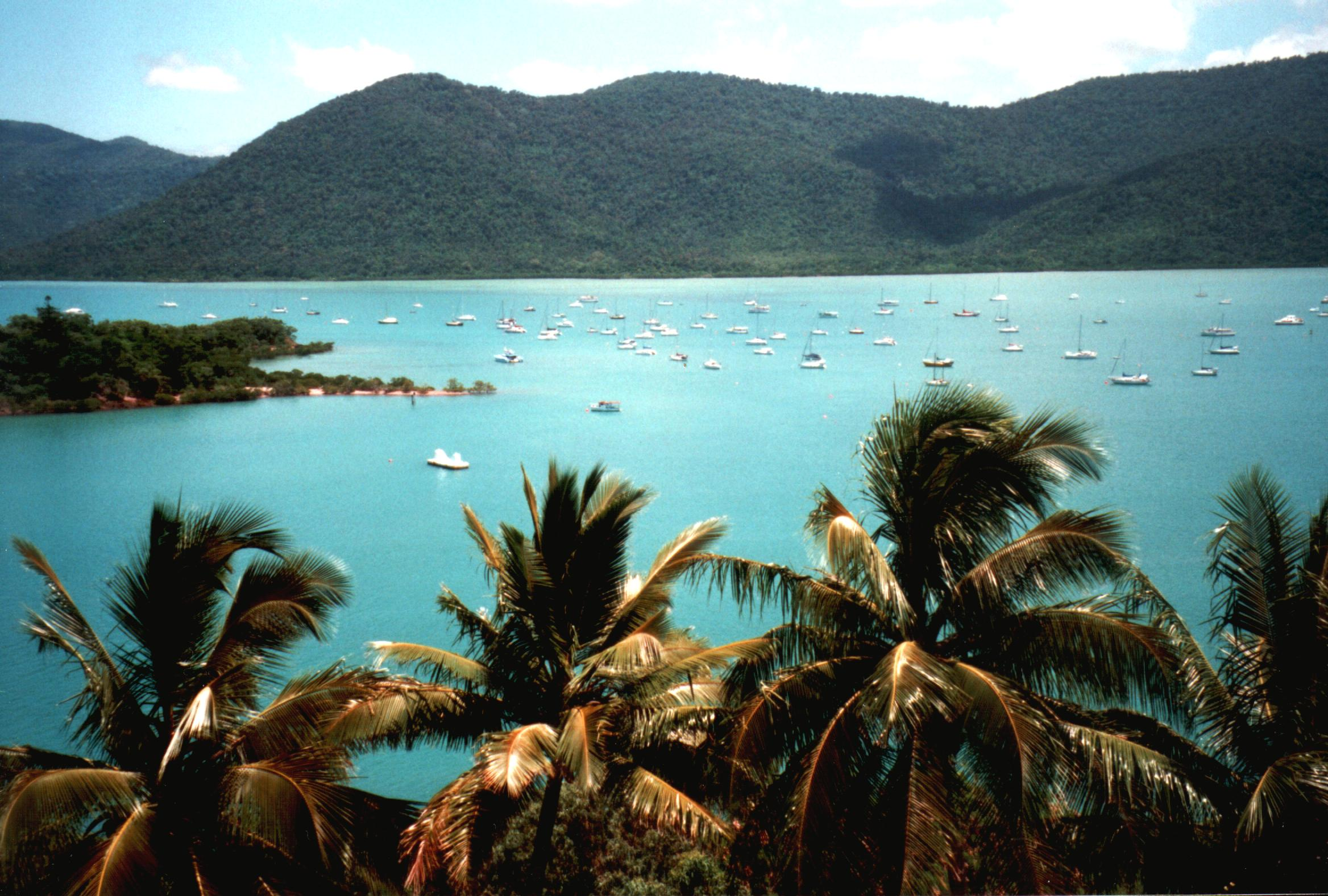
View of vessels in Shute Harbour, 2000

The harbour is busy with many small boats. Commercial operators provide a range of services including bareboats and charter yachts, day tours, scheduled ferries, and water taxi and seaplane services.

A public boat ramp is available on Shute Harbour Road for launching private boats (20.2930°S 148.7851°E). It is managed by the Whitsunday Regional Council.

There is also a public fishing jetty.

There are regular bus services available to and from the port which take the winding road through Conway National Park towards the harbour from Proserpine, Cannonvale and Airlie Beach.

== See also ==
- List of ports in Queensland
