= Mount Pluto, California =

Extinct volcano in California, United States

Mount Pluto
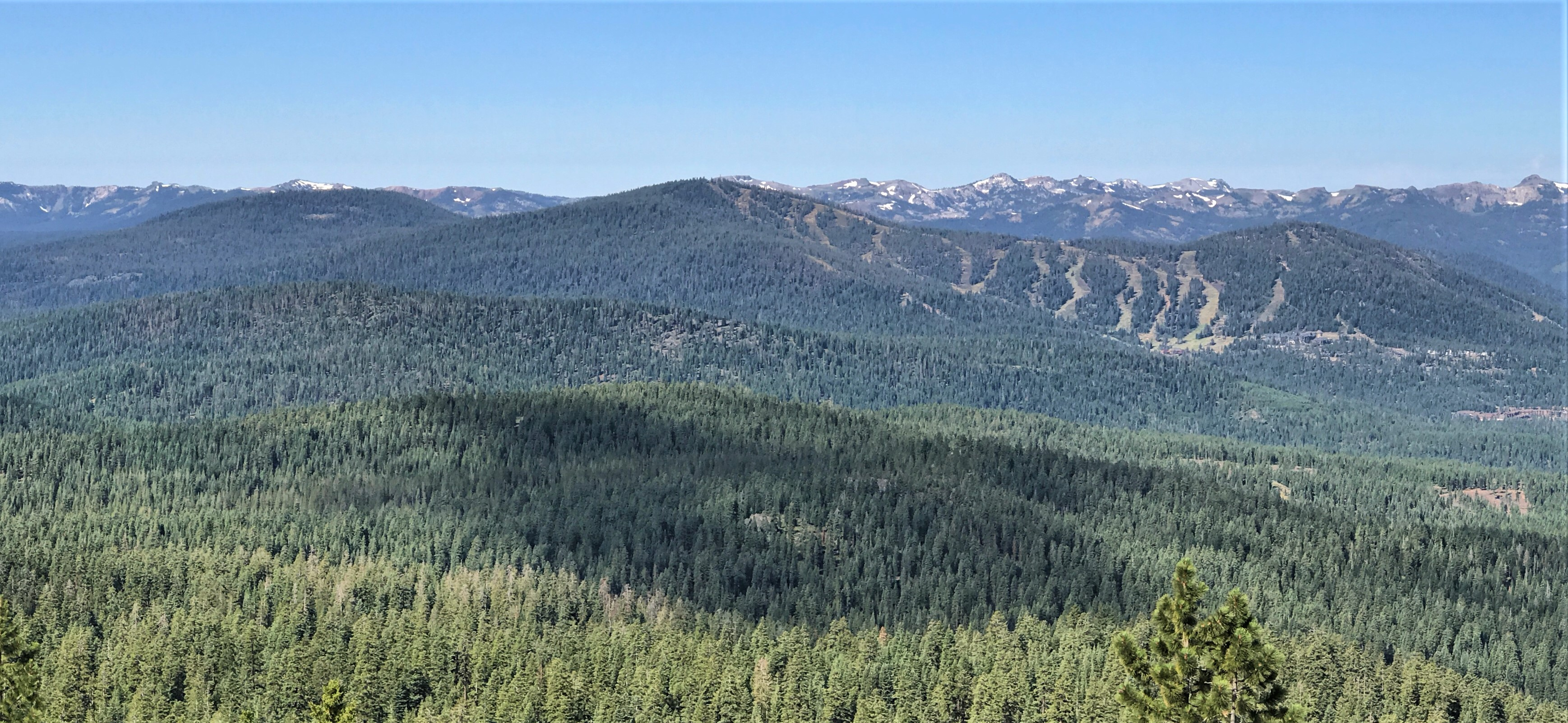
- Northeast aspect, centered

Highest point
- Elevation: 8,617 ft (2,626 m) NGVD 29
- Prominence: 1,457 ft (444 m)
- Coordinates: 39°14′30″N 120°08′23″W

Geography
- Location within California
- Location: Placer County, California
- Parent range: Sierra Nevada
- Topo map: USGS Tahoe City

Geology
- Last eruption: 2 million years ago

Mount Pluto is an extinct volcano in the Granite Chief Range near Lake Tahoe, California. The volcano erupted approximately 2 million years ago producing lava and mudflows that dammed Lake Tahoe. The Northstar California ski resort covers part of the 8,617-foot-high (2,626 m) peak.
