= Hamilton Plains, Queensland =

Hamilton Plains
- Suburb
- Interactive map of Hamilton Plains
- Coordinates: 20.3841°S 148.5788°E
- Country: Australia
- State: Queensland
- LGA: Whitsunday Region
- Location: 1.5 km (0.93 mi) N of Proserpine; 126 km (78 mi) NNW of Mackay; 266 km (165 mi) SE of Townsville; 1,096 km (681 mi) NNW of Brisbane

Government
  - State electorate: Whitsunday
  - Federal division: Dawson

Area
  - Total: 8.4 km^{2} (3.2 sq mi)

Population
  - Total: 80 (2021 census)
  - Density: 9.5/km^{2} (24.7/sq mi)
- Time zone: UTC+10:00 (AEST)
- Postcode: 4800
Suburbs around Hamilton Plains
Foxdale	Strathdickie	Mount Julian
Crystal Brook	Hamilton Plains	Glen Isla
Proserpine	Proserpine	Proserpine

Hamilton Plains is a rural locality in the Whitsunday Region, Queensland, Australia. In the 2021 census, Hamilton Plains had a population of 80 people.

== Geography ==
The Proserpine River forms the western, southern and south-eastern boundary of the locality with Myrtle Creek forming the northern and north-eastern boundary. The land is flat and low-lying (approximately 10 metres above sea level). It is entirely freehold land used for cropping, predominantly sugarcane.

The Bruce Highway traverses the locality from south to north-west. The North Coast railway line also traverses the locality from south to north-west, most of the way it runs immediately parallel and west of the highway. There is no railway station serving the locality. There is also a network of cane tramways to deliver harvested sugarcane to the mill in neighbouring Proserpine.

The Proserpine–Shute Harbour Road (State Route 59) starts at an intersection with the Bruce Highway and runs north and then east through the locality.

== Demographics ==
In the 2016 census, Hamilton Plains had a population of 78 people.

In the 2021 census, Hamilton Plains had a population of 80 people.

== Education ==
There are no schools in Hamilton Plains. The nearest government primary and secondary schools are Proserpine State School and Proserpine State High School, both in neighbouring Proserpine to the south. There is also a Catholic primary and secondary school in Proserpine.
