= Mount Julian, Queensland =

Mount Julian
- Suburb
- Interactive map of Mount Julian
- Coordinates: 20.3772°S 148.605°E
- Country: Australia
- State: Queensland
- LGA: Whitsunday Region
- Location: 7.3 km (4.5 mi) NE of Proserpine; 132 km (82 mi) NNW of Mackay; 268 km (167 mi) SE of Townsville; 1,095 km (680 mi) NNW of Brisbane

Government
  - State electorate: Whitsunday
  - Federal division: Dawson

Area
  - Total: 8.0 km^{2} (3.1 sq mi)

Population
  - Total: 477 (2021 census)
  - Density: 59.6/km^{2} (154.4/sq mi)
- Time zone: UTC+10:00 (AEST)
- Postcode: 4800
Suburbs around Mount Julian
Strathdickie	Mount Marlow	Mount Marlow
Hamilton Plains	Mount Julian	Preston
Glen Isla	Glen Isla	Preston

Mount Julian is a rural locality in the Whitsunday Region, Queensland, Australia. In the 2021 census, Mount Julian had a population of 477 people.

== Geography ==
The locality is bounded to the north-west by Brandy Creek, which becomes a tributary of Myrtle Creek and the south-western boundary of the locality, which then becomes a tributary of the Proserpine River, which is the southern boundary of the locality.

The Proserpine–Shute Harbour Road (State Route 59) runs across the locality from west to east and then turns north along the eastern boundary.

The mountain Mount Julian is in the centre of the locality (20.3744°S 148.6065°E) and rises to 229 metres (751 ft) above sea level. The locality presumably takes its name from the mountain.

The land use is a mixture of growing sugarcane in the north of the locality, rural residential housing on the lower slopes of the mountain, and grazing on native vegetation.

There are cane tramways to transport the harvested sugarcane to the Proserpine sugar mill.

== Demographics ==
In the 2016 census, Mount Julian had a population of 492 people.

In the 2021 census, Mount Julian had a population of 477 people.

== Education ==
There are no schools in Mount Julian. The nearest government primary and secondary schools are Proserpine State School and Proserpine State High School, both in Proserpine to the south-west.
