= Gregory River, Queensland (Whitsunday Region) =

Gregory River
- Suburb
- Interactive map of Gregory River
- Coordinates: 20.2652°S 148.5061°E
- Country: Australia
- State: Queensland
- LGA: Whitsunday Region
- Location: 20.9 km (13.0 mi) N of Proserpine; 146 km (91 mi) NNW of Mackay; 251 km (156 mi) SE of Townsville; 1,118 km (695 mi) NNW of Brisbane

Government
  - State electorate: Whitsunday
  - Federal division: Dawson

Area
  - Total: 193.3 km^{2} (74.6 sq mi)
- Elevation: 0–806 m (0–2,644 ft)

Population
  - Total: 427 (2021 census)
  - Density: 2.2090/km^{2} (5.721/sq mi)
- Time zone: UTC+10:00 (AEST)
- Postcode: 4800
Suburbs around Gregory River
Bowen	Coral Sea	Cape Gloucester
Mount Pluto	Gregory River	Woodwark; Riordanvale
Foxdale	Myrtlevale	Strathdickie; Sugarloaf

Gregory River is a coastal rural locality in the Whitsunday Region, Queensland, Australia. In the 2021 census, Gregory River had a population of 427 people.

== Geography ==
The locality is bounded to the north by Edgecumbe Bay, a bay of the Coral Sea (20.1137°S 148.3902°E). Greta Creek flows into the bay and forms the north-western boundary of the locality (20.18333°S 148.41667°E), while the Gregory River (the watercourse) also flows into the bay and forms the north-eastern boundary of the locality (20.1621°S 148.4297°E). The locality is bounded to the west by the North Coast railway line.

Most of the locality is low flat land 5 to 20 metres (16 to 66 ft) above sea level, but the south-east of the locality where the Gregory River rises is mountainous terrain rising to 806 metres (2,644 ft) above sea level.

Mount Dryander is on the locality's eastern boundary with Cape Gloucester (20.2455°S 148.5575°E), rising to 792 metres (2,598 ft) above sea level. It was named in July 1820 by Lieutenant Phillip Parker King of HM Colonial Cutter Mermaid, after the Swedish botanist Jonas Carllson Dryander who was librarian for Sir Joseph Banks.

The Bruce Highway enters the locality from the south (Myrtlevale) and exits the locality to the north-west (Bowen).

The North Coast railway line follows the western boundary of the locality, entering the locality from the south (Foxdale / Myrtlevale) and exiting to the north-west (Bowen). There are a number of railway stations within the locality, from north to south:

- Debella railway station, now abandoned (20.2380°S 148.4082°E)
- Bubialo railway station (20.2956°S 148.4768°E)
- Koolachu railway station, now abandoned (20.3183°S 148.5043°E)

The mountainous terrain in the south-east of the locality is within the Dryander National Park and the Dryander State Forest. Apart from these protected areas, the predominant land use is grazing on native vegetation. The land in the south of the locality near the Gregory River is mostly used to grow sugarcane. In the north of the locality near the bay, there is coastal marshland and aquaculture (mostly prawn farming). There is also rural residential housing in the south-east of the locality.

There is a small network of cane tramways in the south to the locality to transport the harvested sugarcane to the Proserpine Sugar Mill.

== Demographics ==
In the 2016 census, Gregory River had a population of 307 people.

In the 2021 census, Gregory River had a population of 427 people.

== Economy ==
Proserpine Prawn Farm operated by Tassal is Australia's largest prawn farm (20.1961°S 148.4449°E).

== Education ==
There are no schools in Gregory River. The nearest government primary and secondary schools are Proserpine State School and Proserpine State High School, both in Proserpine to the south, There is also a Catholic primary-and-secondary school in Proserpine.
