= Mount Pluto, Queensland =

Mount Pluto
- Suburb
- Interactive map of Mount Pluto
- Coordinates: 20.3036°S 148.4283°E
- Country: Australia
- State: Queensland
- LGA: Whitsunday Region
- Location: 20.7 km (12.9 mi) NW of Proserpine; 146 km (91 mi) NNW of Mackay; 258 km (160 mi) SE of Townsville; 1,116 km (693 mi) NNW of Brisbane

Government
  - State electorate: Whitsunday
  - Federal division: Dawson

Area
  - Total: 110.3 km^{2} (42.6 sq mi)

Population
  - Total: 0 (2021 census)
  - Density: 0.000/km^{2} (0.000/sq mi)
- Time zone: UTC+10:00 (AEST)
- Postcode: 4800
Suburbs around Mount Pluto
Bowen	Gregory River	Gregory River
Lake Proserpine	Mount Pluto	Gregory River
Lake Proserpine	Crystal Brook	Foxdale

Mount Pluto is a rural locality in the Whitsunday Region, Queensland, Australia. In the 2021 census, Mount Pluto had "no people or a very low population".

== Geography ==
The Proserpine River forms part of the southern boundary.

== Demographics ==
In the 2016 census, Mount Pluto had a population of 6 people.

In the 2021 census, Mount Pluto had "no people or a very low population".

== Education ==
There are no schools in Mount Pluto. The nearest government primary school is Proserpine State School in Proserpine to the south-east. The nearest government secondary schohol is Proserpine State High School, also in Proserpine. There is also a Catholic primary-and-secondary school in Proserpine.
