= Foxdale, Queensland =

Foxdale
- Suburb
- Interactive map of Foxdale
- Coordinates: 20.3377°S 148.5044°E
- Country: Australia
- State: Queensland
- LGA: Whitsunday Region
- Location: 8.1 km (5.0 mi) NW of Proserpine; 133 km (83 mi) NNW of Mackay; 260 km (160 mi) SE of Townsville; 1,094 km (680 mi) NNW of Brisbane

Government
  - State electorate: Whitsunday
  - Federal division: Dawson

Area
  - Total: 23.2 km^{2} (9.0 sq mi)

Population
  - Total: 99 (2021 census)
  - Density: 4.267/km^{2} (11.05/sq mi)
- Time zone: UTC+10:00 (AEST)
- Postcode: 4800
Suburbs around Foxdale
Mount Pluto	Gregory River	Gregory River
Mount Pluto	Foxdale	Myrtlevale
Crystalbrook	Crystalbrook	Hamilon Plains

Foxdale is a rural locality in the Whitsunday Region, Queensland, Australia. In the 2021 census, Foxdale had a population of 99 people.

== Geography ==
Foxale is farming district located to the north west of Proserpine.

The locality is situated between the Proserpine River to the south west and the Bruce Highway and North Coast railway line to the west. The locality was originally served by the Foxdale railway station (20.3619°S 148.5552°E) but this station has been abandoned.

== History ==
The name of the district derives from that of a former property owner and early pioneer in the area called Isaac Alexander Fox (who died in 1918 and is buried in the Proserpine Cemetery).

Foxdale Provisional School opened on 2 June 1904. On 1 January 1909 it became Foxdale State School. It closed in 1972.

== Demographics ==
In the 2016 census, Foxdale had a population of 127 people.

In the 2021 census, Foxdale had a population of 99 people.

== Education ==
There are no schools in Foxdale. The nearest government primary and secondary schools are Proserpine State School and Proserpine State High School, both in Proserpine to the south-east.
