= Airlie Beach, Queensland =

Airlie Beach
- Suburb
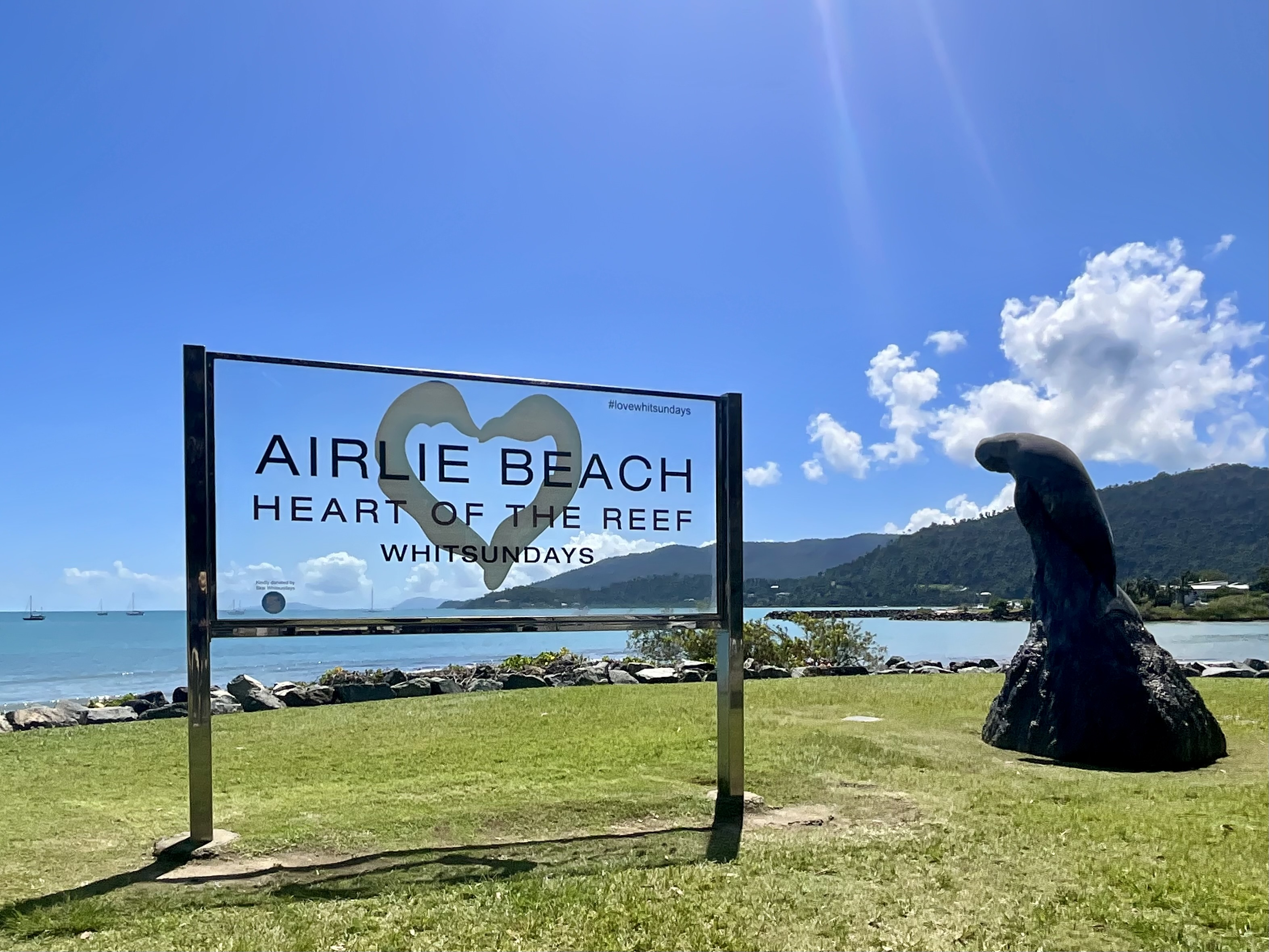
- Airlie Beach

- Interactive map of Airlie Beach
- Coordinates: 20.2744°S 148.715°E
- Country: Australia
- State: Queensland
- LGA: Whitsunday Region
- Location: 3.9 km (2.4 mi) NE of Canonvale; 26.1 km (16.2 mi) NW of Proserpine; 274 km (170 mi) SE of Townsville; 1,114 km (692 mi) NNW of Brisbane

Government
  - State electorate: Whitsunday
  - Federal division: Dawson

Population
  - Total: 1,312 (2021 census)
- Postcode: 4802
Suburbs around Airlie Beach
| Coral Sea | Coral Sea | Coral Sea |
| Cannonvale | Airlie Beach | Mandalay |
| Cannonvale | Cape Conway | Jubilee Pocket |

Airlie Beach is a coastal locality and resort town in the Whitsunday Region of Queensland, Australia. In the 2021 census, Airlie Beach had a population of 1,312 people.

== Geography ==
Airlie Beach is one of many departure points for the Great Barrier Reef. Cruise ships visit the area, anchoring offshore while passengers are transported via ship's tender to the marina.

The Proserpine–Shute Harbour Road (State Route 59) passes through the locality from west to east.

== History ==
The name derived from the former town of Airlie and unbounded locality of Airlie Beach. Airlie was named following a request by the Lands Department in December 1935 for the Proserpine Shire Council to provide a name for a new sub-division on the coast. It is almost certain that the town was named for the parish of Airlie, in Scotland, as the name was suggested by the chairman of the former Proserpine Shire Council, Robert Shepherd, who was born in nearby Montrose, Scotland. The official name was Airlie from 1936 until 1987, when it was amalgamated into the larger town of Whitsunday while Airlie Beach became the official name of the locality.

Airlie Beach Post Office opened on 2 November 1959.

In December 1956, 18 allotments were offered for auction as Perpetual Town Leases by the Department of Public Lands office. The map advertising the auction states the allotments were situated approximately 15 miles north-east of Proserpine.

Busking was made legal in June 2010 through an adopted draft policy created by Whitsunday Regional Council.

In the 2010s, there were several shark attacks off the coast of Airlie Beach. In 2018, there were 2 near fatal attacks and another attack occurred on 29 October 2019.

Airlie Beach has a high number of residents working in the tourism and hospitality industries and in 2020 the town was named one of the most likely Australian towns to suffer for the longest from the economic downturn caused by the 2020 Coronavirus pandemic.

== Demographics ==
At the 2016 census, Airlie Beach had a population of 1,208 people, of whom 50.9% were born in Australia. The next most common country of birth was England at 9.2%. 71.2% of people only spoke English at home. The most common response for religion was No Religion at 34.7% of the population.

At the 2021 census, the locality of Airlie Beach had a population of 1,312 people.

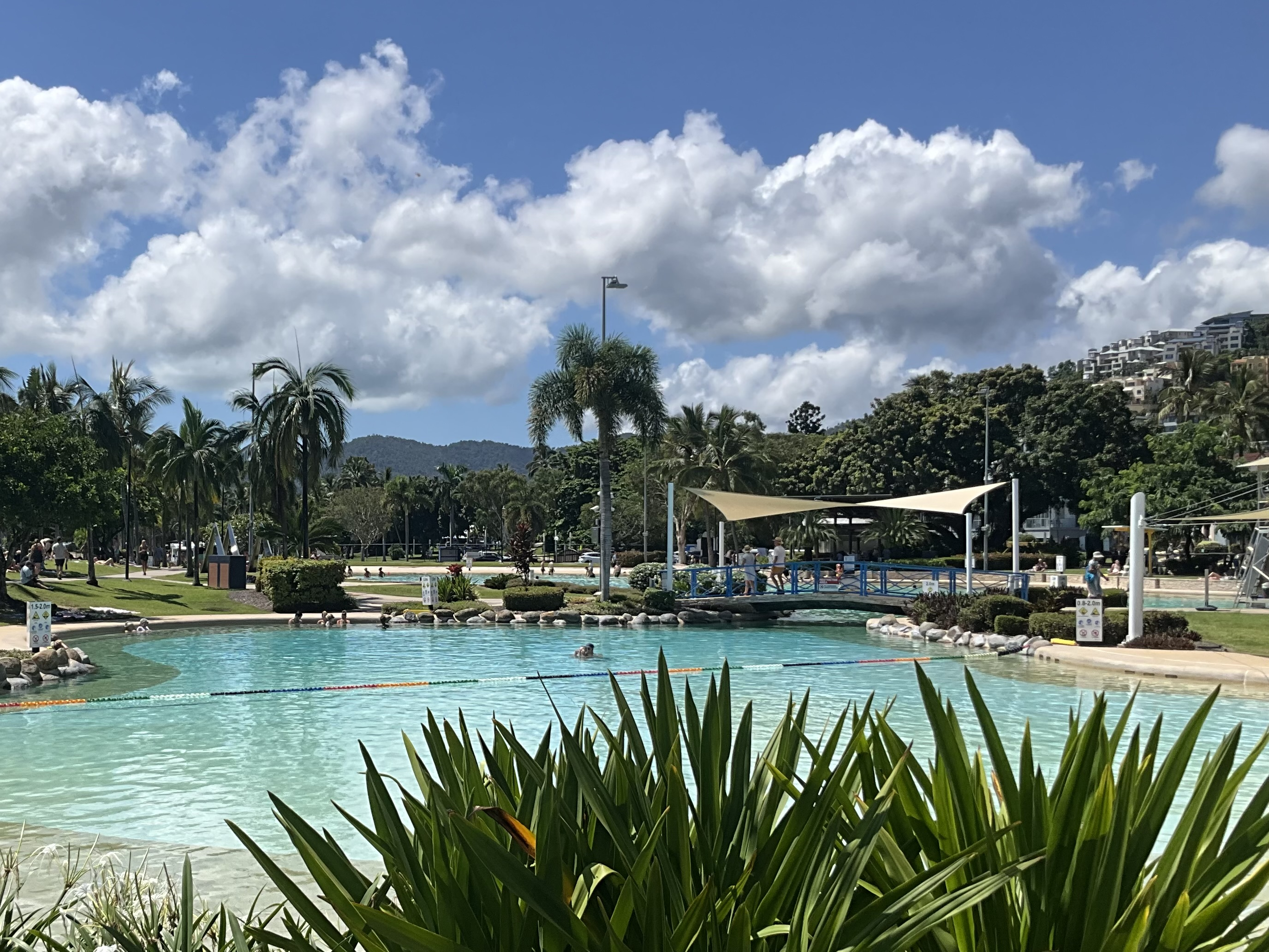
The Airlie Beach lagoon is an enormous swimming area, approximately 4,300sqm, and holds 4.5 million litres of fresh, chlorinated water.

== Education ==
There are no schools in Airlie Beach. The nearest government primary school is Cannonvale State School in neighbouring Cannonvale to the west. The nearest government secondary school is Proserpine State High School in Proserpine to the south-west.

== Facilities ==
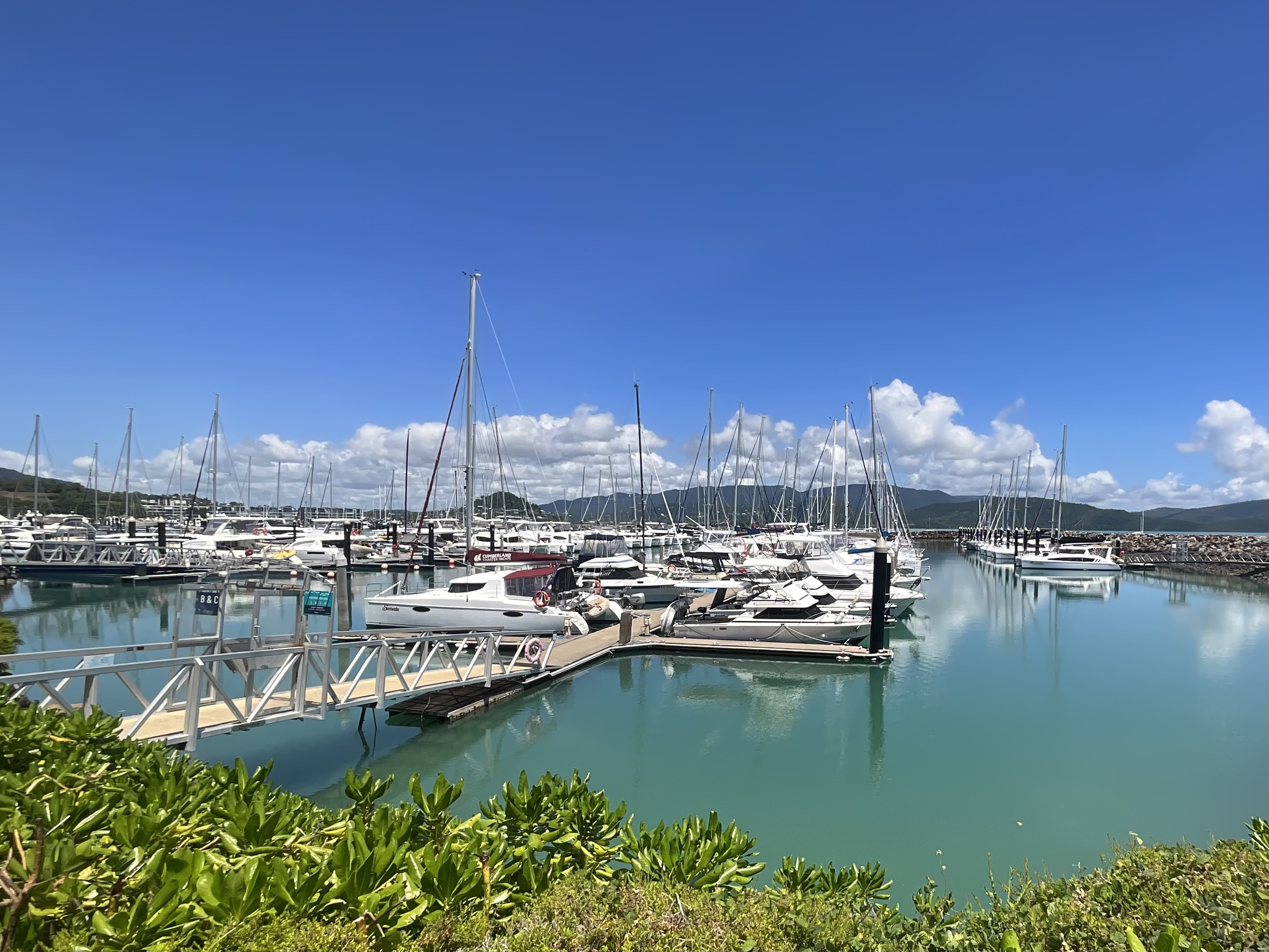
Coral Sea Marina, Airlie Beach

There are two marinas in Airlie Beach:

- Coral Sea Marina (20.2660°S 148.7100°E)
- Port of Airlie Marina (20.2703°S 148.7250°E)

There are two boat ramps, both managed by the Whitsunday Regional Council:

- at Abel Point off Shingley Drive (20.2662°S 148.7123°E)
- at Port of Airlie (20.2736°S 148.7256°E)

Airlie Beach Water Police Station is at 38 Shingley Drive (20.2661°S 148.7130°E). The station's area of responsibility extends from Cape Upstart to north to St Lawrence to the south.

== Transport ==
Air travel is served by the nearest Whitsunday Coast Airport which is located approximately 39 kilometres (24 mi) south of Airlie Beach.

== Events ==
Each year the residents of Airlie Beach celebrate The Blessing of the Fleet on Whitsunday or Pentecost Sunday.

Annually, The Great Barrier Reef Festival is held in Airlie Beach and includes attractions ranging from fireworks on the foreshore to live music by local artists. The event is hosted by local company Cruise Whitsundays.

In November each year, the Airlie Beach Festival of Music is held in the area and spans over multiple days. The event includes both Australian and international musicians that play throughout the festival.

In September 2024 the Whitsundays Writers Festival returned after a seven year hiatus.
