= Whitsunday Region =

Coordinates: 20°00′44″S 148°13′23″E

- Local government area
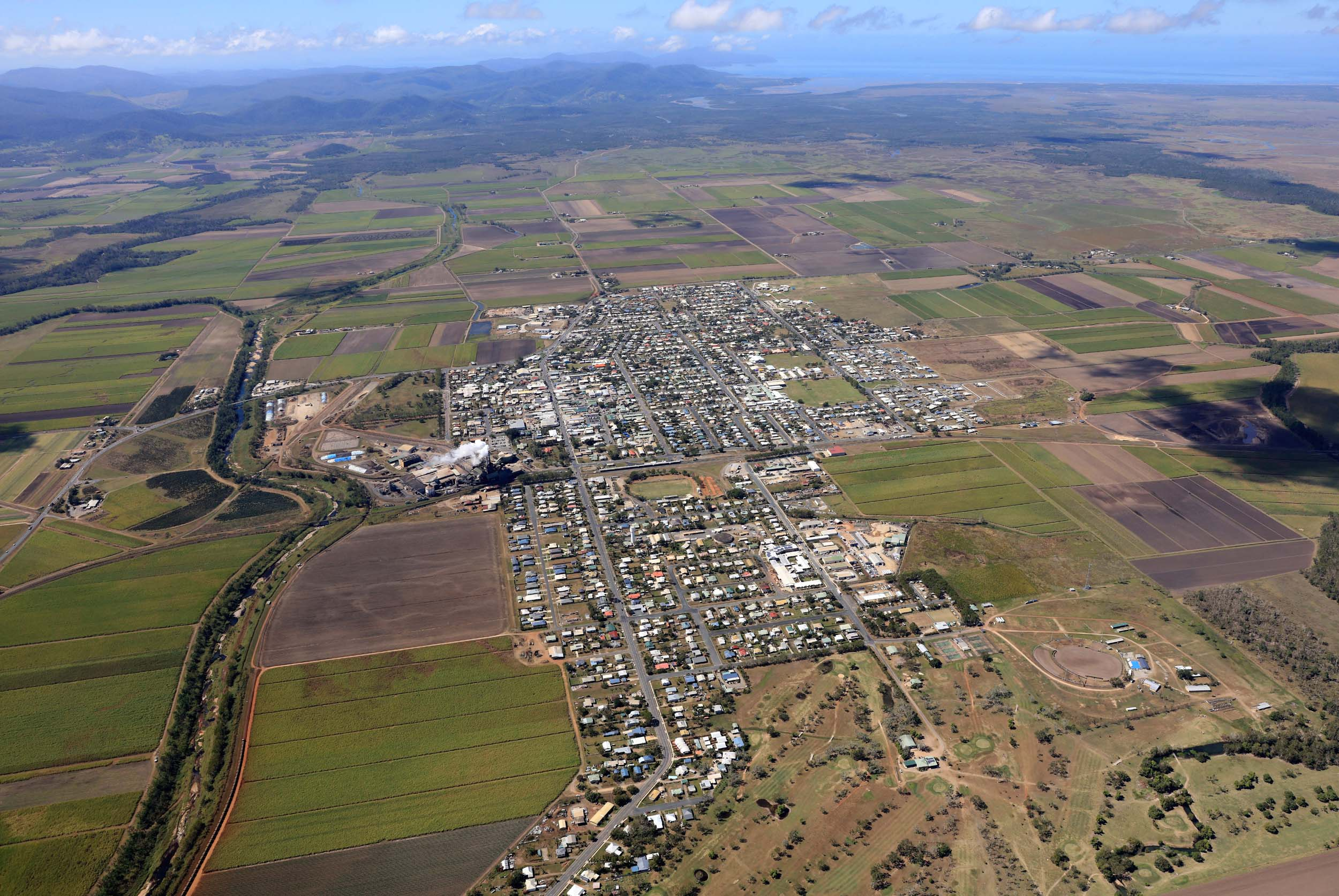
- Aerial view of Proserpine, the service and administrative centre and ultimately gateway to the region by road and rail

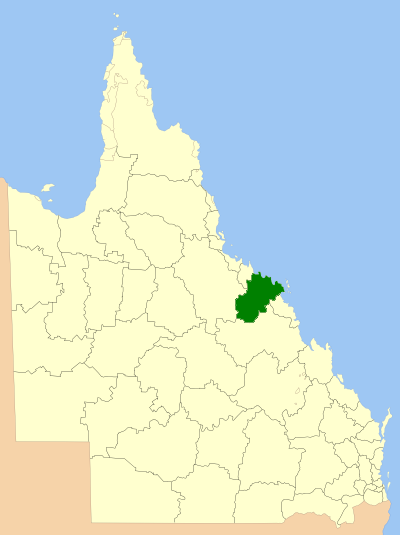
- Location within Queensland
- Interactive map of Whitsunday Region
- Country: Australia
- State: Queensland
- Region: North Queensland
- Established: 2008
- Council seat: Proserpine

Government
  - Mayor: Ry Collins
  - State electorates: Whitsunday; Burdekin
  - Federal divisions: Dawson; Capricornia

Area
  - Total: 23,819 km^{2} (9,197 sq mi)

Population
  - Total: 37,152 (2021 census)
  - Density: 1.55976/km^{2} (4.03977/sq mi)
- Website: Whitsunday Region
LGAs around Whitsunday Region
Burdekin	Coral Sea	Coral Sea
Charters Towers	Whitsunday Region	Coral Sea
Isaac	Isaac	Mackay

The Whitsunday Region is a local government area located in North Queensland, Australia. Established in 2008, it was preceded by two previous local government areas with a history extending back to the establishment of regional local government in Queensland in 1879.

It has an estimated operating budget of A$48.8m.

In the 2021 census, the Whitsunday Region had a population of 37,152 people.

== History ==
Prior to 2008, the new Whitsunday Region was an entire area of two previous and distinct local government areas:

- the Shire of Bowen;
- and the Shire of Whitsunday.

The Bowen Municipality was constituted on 7 August 1863 under the Municipalities Act 1858 (a piece of New South Wales legislation inherited by Queensland at its separation four years earlier). On 11 November 1879, the Wangaratta Division was created as one of 74 divisions around Queensland under the Divisional Boards Act 1879. With the passage of the Local Authorities Act 1902, Wangaratta became a shire and Bowen became a town on 31 March 1903.

On 19 January 1910, the Shire of Proserpine was excised from Wangaratta. It was renamed on 18 February 1989.

On 2 April 1960, the Town of Bowen was abolished, and merged into the Shire of Wangaratta, which was renamed Bowen.

In July 2007, the Local Government Reform Commission released its report and recommended that the two areas amalgamate. Both councils and residents across the board opposed amalgamation, although amalgamation with each other was the preferred option of each if forced to choose. On 15 March 2008, the Shires formally ceased to exist, and elections were held on the same day to elect councillors and a mayor to the Regional Council.

In 2012, a petition signed by over 1600 people requested that the Whitsunday Region be de-amalgamated. Although the number of signatories was sufficiently large, the Queensland Government refused the request for a de-amalgamation vote arguing that the financial modelling did not show that deamalgamation would be financially viable.

In March 2017, many areas of the Whitsunday Region were damaged by Cyclone Debbie. The Proserpine Council Chambers was extensively damaged.

=== Cyclone Debbie recovery ===
A new $6 million council administration building will be constructed in Proserpine during late 2018/2019, after this facility is completed workers that are temporarily being housed in Cannonvale will re-locate back to Proserpine. This will be a major new building that will also include a new disaster hub and resilience center.

== Current council ==
The council is split into six divisions, each returning one councillor, plus a mayor.

Division	Name	Notes	Political affiliation
-	Ry Collins	Mayor	Independent
1	Jan Clifford		Independent
2	Clay Bauman		Independent
3	John Collins		Independent
4	Michelle Wright		Independent
5	Gary Simpson		Independent
6	John Finlay	Deputy mayor	Independent

== Towns and localities ==
The Whitsunday Region includes the following settlements:

Bowen area:

- Bowen
- Collinsville
- Binbee
- Bogie
- Brisk Bay
- Gumlu
- Guthalungra
- Inveroona
- Merinda
- Mount Coolon
- Mount Wyatt
- Newlands
- Queens Beach
- Scottville
- Springlands

Whitsunday area:

- Proserpine
- Airlie Beach
- Andromache
- Brandy Creek
- Breadalbane
- Cannon Valley
- Cannonvale
- Cape Conway
- Cape Gloucester
- Conway
- Conway Beach
- Crystal Brook
- Daydream Island
- Dingo Beach
- Dittmer
- Flametree
- Foxdale
- Glen Isla
- Gloucester Island
- Goorganga Creek
- Goorganga Plains
- Gregory River
- Gunyarra
- Hamilton Island
- Hamilton Plains
- Hayman Island
- Hideaway Bay
- Jubilee Pocket
- Kelsey Creek
- Laguna Quays
- Lake Proserpine
- Lethebrook
- Mandalay
- Mount Julian
- Mount Marlow
- Mount Pluto
- Mount Rooper
- Myrtlevale
- Palm Grove
- Pauls Pocket
- Preston
- Riordanvale
- Shute Harbour
- Silver Creek
- Strathdickie
- Sugarloaf
- Thoopara
- Wilson Beach
- Woodwark

== Libraries ==
The Whitsunday Regional Council operate public libraries at Bowen, Cannonvale, Collinsville, and Proserpine.

== Heritage register ==
The Whitsunday Regional Council maintains the Whitsunday Local Heritage Register.

== Demographics ==
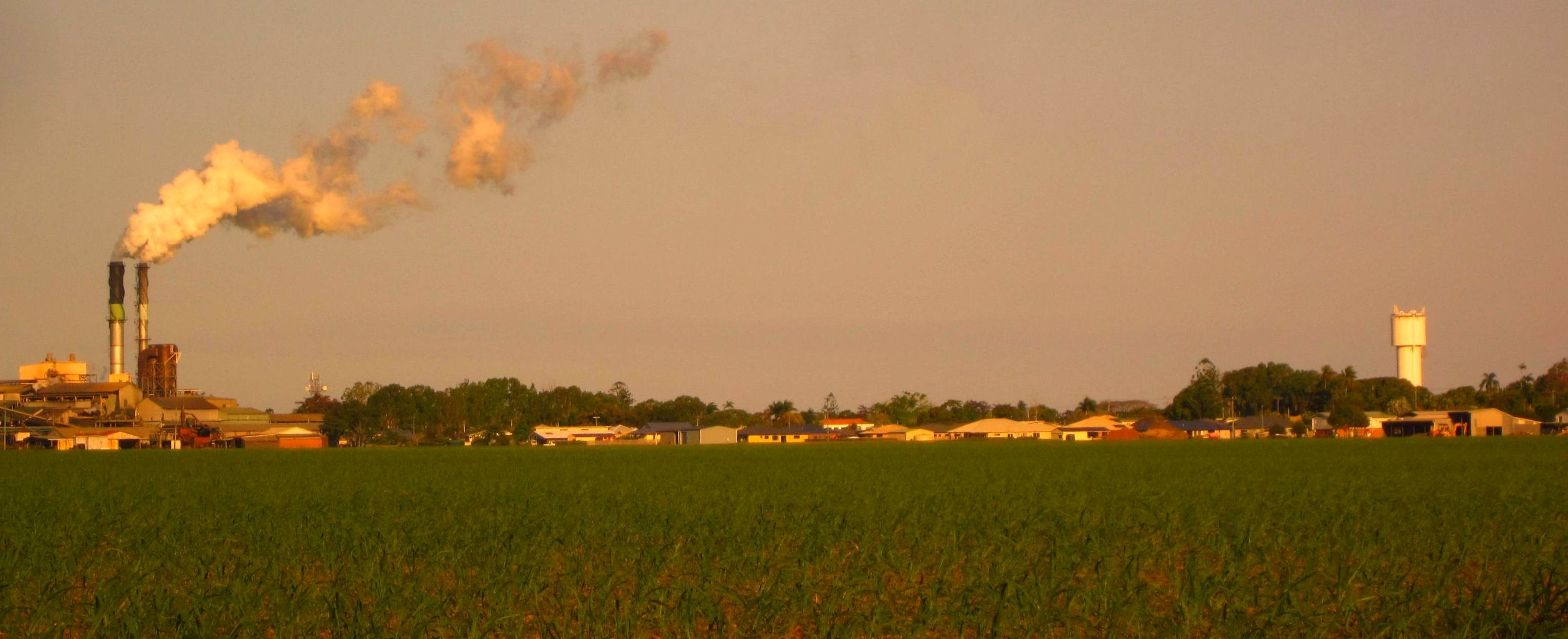
Proserpine, a major population centre in the Whitsunday Region, home to the region's hospital, railway station, airport and a variety of educational facilities from early education up to secondary school.

Year	Population (Total)	Population (Bowen)	Population (Whitsunday)	Notes
1933	11,477	7,543	3,934	
1947	11,700	8,083	3,617	
1954	13,094	8,518	4,576	
1961	14,604	9,491	5,113	
1966	15,616	9,342	6,274	
1971	16,651	10,231	6,420	
1976	19,038	11,292	7,746	
1981	24,478	13,645	10,833	
1986	25,945	14,364	11,581	
1991	29,388	14,161	15,227	
1996	31,202	14,411	16,791	
2001	32,021	13,698	18,323	
2006	36,158	14,625	21,533	
2011	31,426			
2016	33,778			
2021	37,152			

== List of mayors ==
#	Name	Party	Years in office
1	Mike Brunker	Labor	2008–2012
2	Jennifer Whitney	Independent	2012–2016
3	Andrew Willcox	Liberal National	2016–2022
4	Julie Hall	One Nation	2022–2024
5.	Ry Collins	Independent	2024-present

== See also ==
- Whitsunday
