= Conway National Park =

National park in Australia

- IUCN category II (national park)
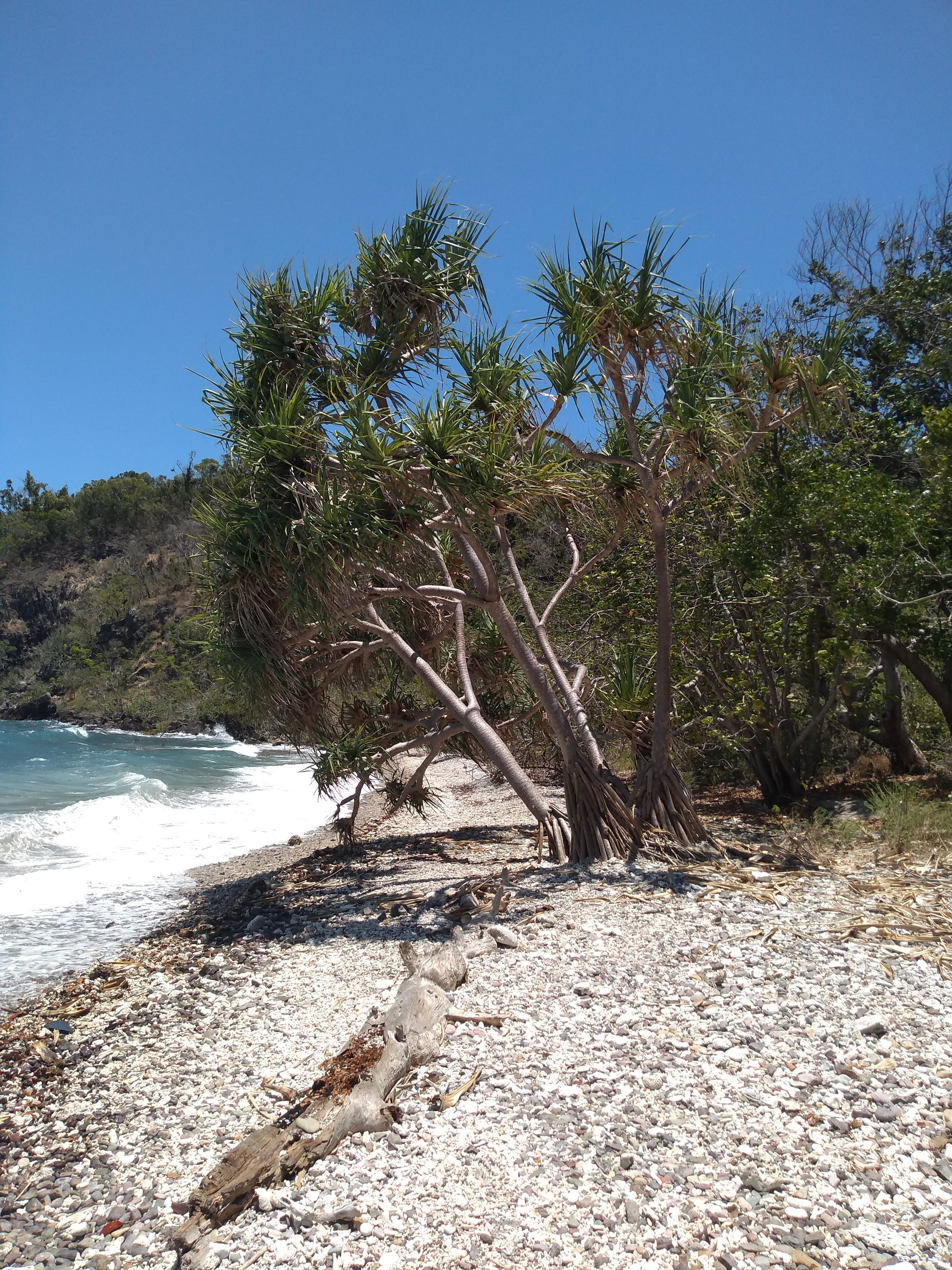
- Coral Beach, Conway National Park

- Location within Queensland
- Location: Queensland
- Nearest city: Proserpine
- Coordinates: 20°15′48″S 148°45′54″E
- Area: 225 km^{2} (87 sq mi)
- Established: 1938
- Governing body: Queensland Parks and Wildlife Service
- Website: www.nprsr.qld.gov.au/parks/conway

Conway is a national park in Queensland, Australia, 911 km northwest of Brisbane. The park's main feature is the Conway Peninsula which is covered by the largest area of lowland tropical rainforest in Queensland outside Tropical North Queensland.

The average elevation of the terrain is 44 metres.

== Flora and Fauna ==
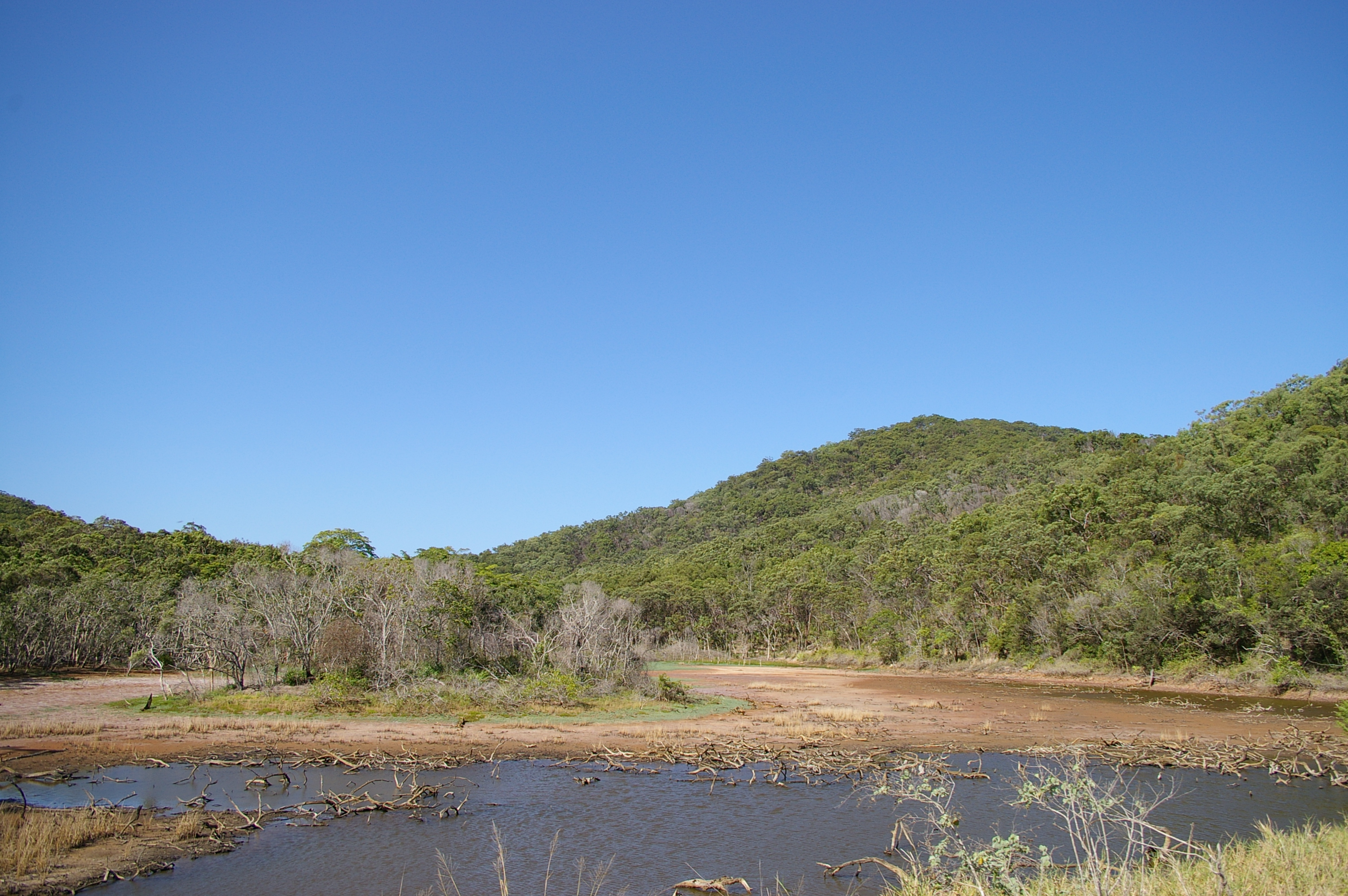
Saltmarsh and dry vine forest, Conway National Park, Mt Rooper

Among the plant species in the park are dry vine thicket, mangroves, open forests with a grasstree understorey, paperbark and pandanus woodlands and others. Park is also home to two mound-building birds, the Australian brush-turkey and the orange-footed scrubfowl.

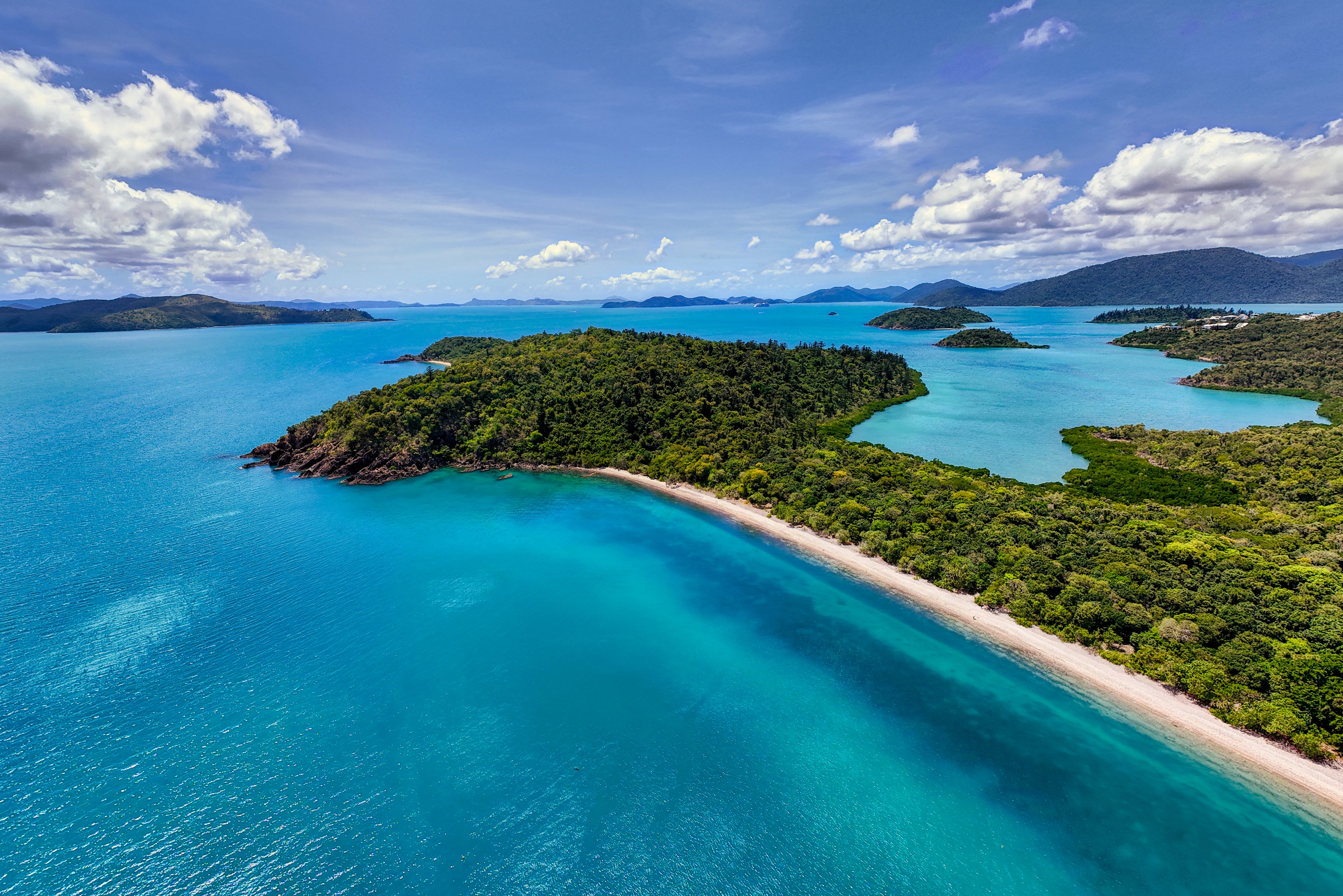
The Beak Lookout area

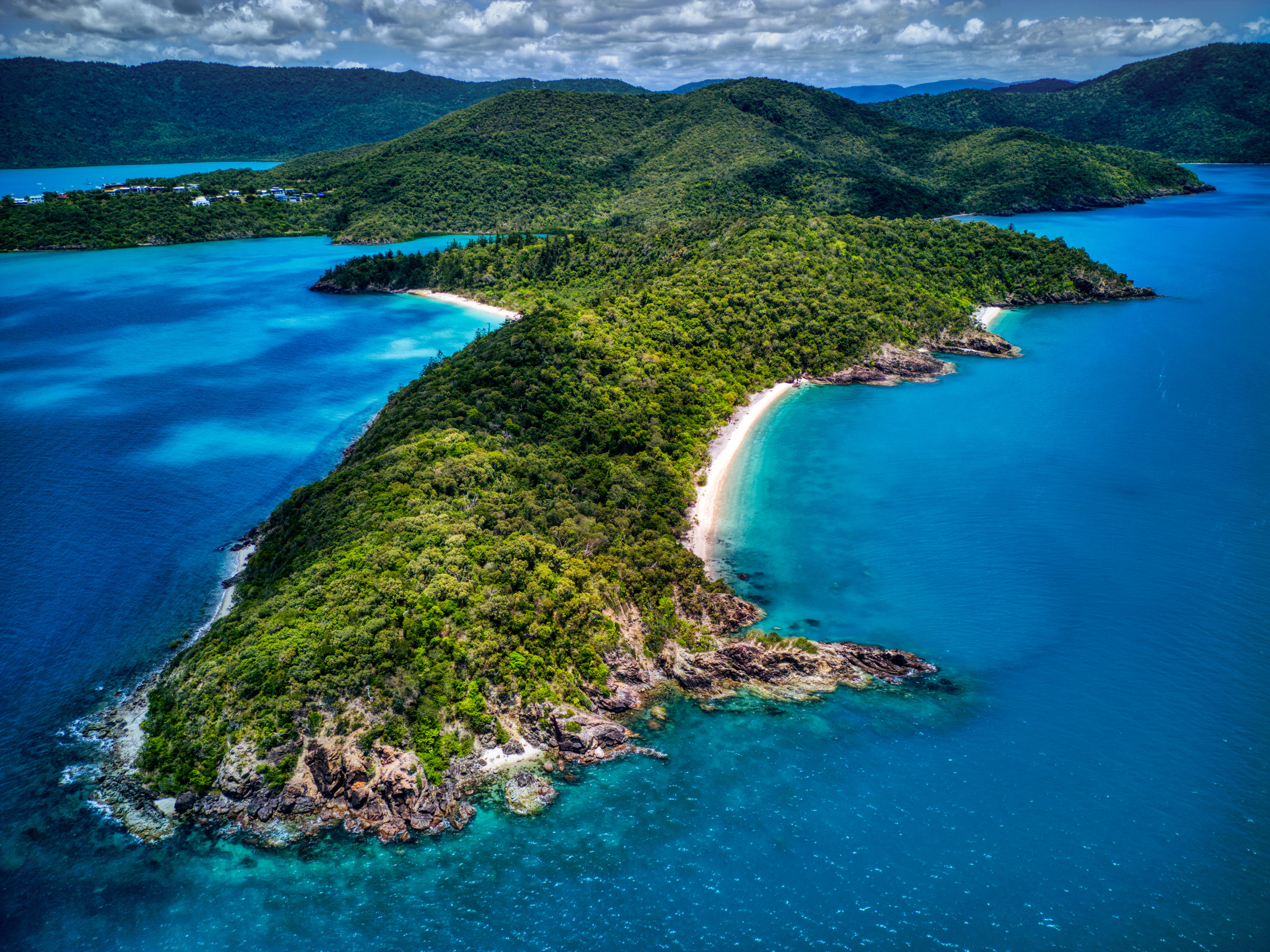
The Beak Lookout area

== Public access ==
Walk-in bush camping is permitted however there are no established camp sites. There are a number of walking tracks graded from easy to moderate.

== See also ==
- Protected areas of Queensland
