= List of schools in North Queensland =

This is a list of schools in the North Queensland region of Queensland, Australia, and includes schools in North West Queensland. The region is centred on the coastal cities of Townsville and Mackay, and the inland city of Mount Isa. It includes the following local government areas:

- Shire of Burdekin
- Charters Towers Region
- Shire of Cloncurry
- Shire of Flinders
- Shire of Hinchinbrook
- Mackay Region
- Shire of Mckinlay
- City of Mount Isa
- Aboriginal Shire of Palm Island
- Shire of Richmond
- City of Townsville
- Whitsunday Region

Prior to 2015, the Queensland education system consisted of primary schools, which accommodated students from Kindergarten to Year 7 (ages 5–13), and high schools, which accommodate students from Years 8 to 12 (ages 12–18). However, from 2015, Year 7 became the first year of high school.

== State schools ==
=== State primary schools ===
Name	Suburb	LGA	Opened	Coords	Notes
Abergowrie State School	Abergowrie	Hinchinbrook	1953	18.4746°S 145.8835°E	5 Venables Road.
Airville State School	Airville	Burdekin	1890	19.6551°S 147.3476°E	Old Clare Road.
Aitkenvale State School	Aitkenvale	Townsville	1924	19.29594°S 146.76219°E	67–85 Wotton Street.
Alligator Creek State School	Alligator Creek	Mackay	1896	21.3293°S 149.2115°E	50 Grasstree Road.
Andergrove State School	Andergrove	Mackay	1939	21.0862°S 149.1882°E	Fernleigh Avenue.
Annandale State School	Annandale	Townsville	1998	19.3152°S 146.7784°E	Cnr Oleander Street and Yolanda Drive.
Ayr State School	Ayr	Burdekin	1886	19.5790°S 147.4005°E	Central school 1928–1936. At 141 Graham Street.
Barkly Highway State School	Soldiers Hill	Mount Isa	1959	20.7076°S 139.4893°E	17 Bougainville Street.
Beaconsfield State School	Beaconsfield	Mackay	1999	21.0933°S 149.1713°E	In Nadina Street.
Belgian Gardens State School	Belgian Gardens	Townsville	1887	19.2507°S 146.7928°E	At 43 Potts Street.
Bloomsbury State School	Bloomsbury	Mackay	1927	20.7028°S 148.5955°E	At 8545 Bruce Highway.
Bluewater State School	Bluewater	Townsville	1957	19.1748°S 146.5556°E	Provisional until Feb 1960. At 1–3 Ditton Street with its entrance on Buckby Street.
Bohlevale State School	Burdell	Townsville	1911	19.2488°S 146.6855°E	At Bohlevale School Road.
Bowen State School	Bowen	Whitsunday	1865	20.0098°S 148.2435°E	At 29 Kennedy Street. Listed on the Queensland Heritage Register.
Brandon State School	Brandon	Burdekin	1888	19.5537°S 147.3485°E	On Drysdale Street.
Bucasia State School	Bucasia	Mackay	1985	21.0309°S 149.1578°E	At 76 Kemp Street.
Bwgcolman Community School	Palm Island	Palm Island	1964	18.7362°S 146.5781°E	P–10. Formerly Palm Island CS until 1994. On Creek Road.
Cameron Downs State School	Tangorin	Flinders	1967	21.3745°S 144.2788°E	Early Childhood Year 6. On Cameron Downs School Road off Hughenden-Muttaburra Road.
Camooweal State School	Camooweal	Mount Isa	1893	19.9188°S 138.1203°E	Early Childhood-Year 6. Nowranie Street.
Cannonvale State School	Cannonvale	Whitsunday	1892–1908		Cannon Vale Provisional School opened on 8 February 1892. It closed in 1908.
Cannonvale State School	Cannonvale	Whitsunday	1910–1968	20.2890°S 148.6784°E	In 1910 the school reopened as Cannon Valley State School on a new site on the north-eastern corner of Shute Harbour Road and Abell Road. The 1910 site is now within the boundaries of Cannonvale rather than Cannon Valley.
Cannonvale State School	Cannonvale	Whitsunday	1968	20.2747°S 148.6996°E	In 1968, it was decided to relocate the school back into Cannonvale and the school was then renamed Cannonvale State School. At 56 Coral Esplanade.
Charters Towers Central State School	Charters Towers CBD	Charters Towers	1875	20.0801°S 146.2631°E	Split sex until 1965. At 39–47 High Street.
Chelona State School	Chelona	Mackay	1893	21.2603°S 149.1451°E	At 13 Chelona School Access Road.
Clare State School	Clare	Burdekin	1921	19.7832°S 147.2268°E	On Larkin Street.
Collinsville State School	Collinsville	Whitsunday	1921	20.5483°S 147.8456°E	On Devlin Street.
Coningsby State School	Farleigh	Mackay	1884	21.0925°S 149.0688°E	At 1312 Bruce Highway.
Cranbrook State School	Cranbrook	Townsville	1981	19.3092°S 146.7538°E	On Alice Street.
Currajong State School	Gulliver	Townsville	1954	19.2802°S 146.7741°E	At 140 Palmerston Street in Gulliver, adjacent to Currajong's southern boundary.
Dajarra State School	Dajarra	Cloncurry	1920	21.6946°S 139.5122°E	On Matheson Street.
Dundula State School	Bakers Creek	Mackay	1922	21.2016°S 149.1487°E	At 1 Main Street.
East Ayr State School	Ayr	Burdekin	1952	19.5634°S 147.4164°E	At 43–73 Ross Street.
Eimeo Road State School	Rural View	Mackay	1934	21.0593°S 149.1616°E	At 21 Eimeo Road.
Eton State School	Eton	Mackay	1883	21.2642°S 148.9765°E	At 10 Prospect Street.
Eungella State School	Eungella	Mackay	1928	21.1344°S 148.4912°E	At 36 Eungella Dam Road.
Farleigh State School	Farleigh	Mackay	1909	21.1066°S 149.1018°E	On Childlow Street.
Finch Hatton State School	Finch Hatton	Mackay	1909	21.1396°S 148.6394°E	On the Mackay–Eungella Road.
Fitzgerald State School	North Mackay	Mackay	1979	21.1151°S 149.1681°E	On Norris Road.
Forrest Beach State School	Forrest Beach	Hinchinbrook	1980	18.7114°S 146.2943°E	At 40 Pandanus Street.
Garbutt State School	Garbutt	Townsville	1932	19.2618°S 146.7755°E	At 76 Chandler Street.
Gargett State School	Gargett	Mackay	1914	21.1557°S 148.7407°E	At Tom Lynch Street.
Giru State School	Giru	Burdekin	1924	19.5129°S 147.1096°E	At 45–51 Luxton Street.
Glenella State School	Glenella	Mackay	1912	21.1214°S 149.1493°E	At 35-55 Hill End Road.
Greenvale State School	Greenvale	Charters Towers	1972	18.9991°S 144.9805°E	Previous provisional school 1919–1926. At Cassia Court.
Gumlu State School	Gumlu	Whitsunday	1913		
Halifax State School	Halifax	Hinchinbrook	1883	18.5836°S 146.2846°E	At 17 Victoria Terrace.
Hamilton Island State School	Hamilton Island	Whitsunday	1986	20.34529°S 148.95274°E	Located in the north-west of the island between the marina and Catseye Beach.
Hampden State School	Hampden	Mackay	1887		Provisional until Aug 1926
Happy Valley State School	Happy Valley	Mount Isa	1942		
Hayman Island State School	Hayman Island	Whitsunday	1956	20.0565°S 148.8873°E	Located in the south-west of the island near the harbour.
Healy State School	Healy	Mount Isa	1972		
Heatley State School	Heatley	Townsville	1971		
Hermit Park State School	Hyde Park	Townsville	1924		
Home Hill State School	Home Hill	Burdekin	1914		
Homebush State School	Homebush	Mackay	1889		
Homestead State School	Homestead	Charters Towers	1893		
Ingham State School	Ingham	Hinchinbrook	1885	18.6525°S 146.1615°E	At 28 McIlwraith Street.
Jarvisfield State School	Jarvisfield	Burdekin	1915	19.6009°S 147.4606°E	At 516 Rita Island Road.
Julia Creek State School	Julia Creek	McKinlay	1911	20.6568°S 141.7463°E	On Burke Street.
Kalamia State School	Brandon	Burdekin	1928	19.5185°S 147.4176°E	On Lilliesmere Road.
Kelso State School	Kelso	Townsville	1986		
Kirwan State School	Kirwan	Townsville	1977		
Koumala State School	Koumala	Mackay	1922		
Mackay Central State School	Mackay	Mackay	1871	21.146°S 149.182°E	Added to the Queensland Heritage Register on 28 July 2000.
Mackay North State School	North Mackay	Mackay	1915	21.1220°S 149.1840°E	On the corner of Evans Avenue and Harvey Street.
Mackay West State School	West Mackay	Mackay	1924		
Macknade State School	Macknade	Hinchinbrook	1893		
Magnetic Island State School	Nelly Bay	Townsville (Offshore)	1924		Formerly Nelly Bay SS until 1973
Maidavale State School	Airville	Burdekin	1910	19.6025°S 147.3599°E	At Maidavale Road.
Marian State School	Marian	Mackay	1886	21.1454°S 148.9585°E	Opened as the Marian Mill Provisional School, becoming Marian State School in In 1899. At 137 Anzac Avenue.
Merinda State School	Merinda (Bowen)	Whitsunday	1898		
Millaroo State School	Millaroo	Burdekin	1954	20.0581°S 147.2806°E	At 1–13 Cunningham Street.
Millchester State School	Millchester	Charters Towers	1874		
Mirani State School	Mirani	Mackay	1892	21.1614°S 148.8619°E	At 12 Maud Street.
Mount Fox State School	Mount Fox	Hinchinbrook	1938		
Mount Isa Central State School	Mount Isa CBD	Mount Isa	1924		
Mundingburra State School	Mundingburra	Townsville	1884		
Mutarnee State School	Mutarnee	Townsville (Rural)	1920		
Northview State School	Mount Pleasant	Mackay	1986		
North Eton State School	North Eton	Mackay	1895		Also known as Eton North State School
North Shore State School	Burdell	Townsville	2018	19.2332°S 146.6961°E	At Langford Street.
Oakenden State School	Oakenden	Mackay	1910		
Oonoonba State School	Idalia	Townsville	1920		
Osborne State School	Osborne	Burdekin	1914		
Pentland State School	Pentland	Charters Towers	1885	21.2658°S 143.8083°E	At 18 Mill Street (corner of Gilmore Street).
Pindi Pindi State School	Pindi Pindi	Mackay	1928	20.8703°S 148.7322°E	At 5923 Bruce Highway.
Pinnacle State School	Pinnacle	Mackay	1908		
Prairie State School	Prairie	Flinders	1894		
Proserpine State School	Proserpine	Whitsunday	1897	20.4090°S 148.5823°E	Early Childhood-6. At 33 Renwick Road.
Queens Beach State School	Bowen	Whitsunday	1940		
Railway Estate State School	Railway Estate	Townsville	1916	19.2742°S 146.8157°E	At 39 Railway Avenue.
Rasmussen State School	Rasmussen	Townsville	1978		
Ravenswood State School	Ravenswood	Charters Towers	1873- circa 2019	20.1041°S 146.8898°E	On School Street.
Ravenswood State School	Ravenswood	Charters Towers	circa 2019-	20.09620°S 146.88703°E	In 2019, an expansion of gold mining required the school and its heritage buildings to be relocated to a new site at 30-40 Elphinstone Street.
Richmond State School	Richmond	Richmond	1889	20.7341°S 143.1430°E	P–10. At 88 Crawford Street.
Richmond Hill State School	Richmond Hill	Charters Towers	1895		
Rollingstone State School	Rollingstone	Townsville (Rural)	1916		
Sarina State School	Sarina	Mackay	1897		Formerly Plane Creek until 1912.
Scottville State School	Scottville	Whitsunday	1924		
Seaforth State School	Seaforth	Mackay	1935		
Slade Point State School	Slade Point	Mackay	1939		
Sunset State School	Sunset	Mount Isa	1968		
Swayneville State School	Sarina	Mackay	1935		
The Willows State School	Kirwan	Townsville	1997		
Toobanna State School	Toobanna	Hinchinbrook	1922	18.7121°S 146.1478°E	At 49055 Bruce Highway.
Townsville Central State School	North Ward	Townsville	1869		
Townsville South State School	South Townsville	Townsville	1884		
Townsville West State School	West End	Townsville	1887	19.2681°S 146.8038°E	Added to the Queensland Heritage Register on 5 October 1998.
Townview State School	Townview	Mount Isa	1965		
Trebonne State School	Trebonne	Hinchinbrook	1906	18.6308°S 146.0747°E	Formerly named Upper Trebonne Provisional School between 1906 and 1909 and Upper Trebonne State School between 1909 and 1931.
Victoria Park State School	East Mackay	Mackay	1926		
Victoria Plantation State School	Victoria Plantation	Hinchinbrook	1894		
Vincent State School	Vincent	Townsville	30 January 1968		
Walkerston State School	Walkerston	Mackay	1880	21.1589°S 149.0649°E	On Dutton Street.
Weir State School	Thuringowa Central	Townsville	1881		
Woodstock State School	Woodstock	Townsville (Rural)	1890	19.5980°S 146.8351°E	On Woodstock Avenue.
Wulguru State School	Wulguru	Townsville	30 January 1962		

=== State high schools and colleges ===
Name	Suburb	LGA	Opened	Coords	Notes
Ayr State High School	Ayr	Burdekin	1937	19.5771°S 147.409°E	At 82–90 Wickham Street. Listed on the Queensland Heritage Register.
Bowen State High School	Bowen	Whitsunday	1961		
Calen District State College	Calen	Mackay	1925	20.8993°S 148.7704°E	Prep–12 school. Known as Calen State School until 2003. At 38 McIntyre Street.
Charters Towers State High School	Charters Towers CBD	Charters Towers	1912		
Cloncurry State School	Cloncurry	Cloncurry	1884		Prep–12
Collinsville State High School	Collinsville	Whitsunday	1986		
Heatley Secondary College	Heatley	Townsville	1968		Formerly Heatley State High School. Name changed on 16 December 1999.
Home Hill State High School	Home Hill	Burdekin	1964		
Hughenden State School	Hughenden	Flinders	1880	20.8459°S 144.1965°E	Prep–12. At 12 Moran Street.
Ingham State High School	Ingham	Hinchinbrook	1952	18.6537°S 146.1686°E	At 12 Menzies Street.
Kirwan State High School	Kirwan	Townsville	1979		
Mackay North State High School	North Mackay	Mackay	1964	21.1156°S 149.1738°E	On Valley Street.
Mackay Northern Beaches State High School	Rural View	Mackay	2013	21.0670°S 149.1616°E	At 30 Rosewood Drive.
Mackay State High School	Mackay	Mackay	1912		
Mirani State High School	Mirani	Mackay	1967	21.1576°S 148.8623°E	At Augusta Street.
Northern Beaches State High School	Deeragun	Townsville	1997	19.2479°S 146.6735°E	At 115 Geaney Lane (off Meranti Street).
Pimlico State High School	Gulliver	Townsville	1959	19.2887°S 146.7826°E	On Fulham Road in Gulliver, adjacent to Pimlico's western boundary.
Pioneer State High School	Andergrove	Mackay	1986		
Proserpine State High School	Proserpine	Whitsunday	1963	20.4059°S 148.5818°E	At 4 Ruge Street.
Sarina State High School	Sarina	Mackay	1964		
Spinifex State College	Parkside	Mount Isa	2003	20.7348°S 139.4871°E	A merger of Mount Isa State High School and Kalkadoon State High School. The junior campus (Years 7–9) occupies the former Mount Isa State High School site at 6–16 Fifth Avenue, Parkside.
Spinifex State College	Pioneer	Mount Isa	2003	20.7229°S 139.5106°E	The senior campus (Years 10–12) occupies the former Kalkadoon State High School site at 137–179 Abel Smith Parade, Pioneer.
Thuringowa State High School	Condon	Townsville	1987		
Townsville State High School	Townsville CBD	Townsville	1924–1964	19.2599°S 146.8131°E	At the Townsville Technical College on the corner of Walker and Stanley Streets.
Townsville State High School	Railway Estate	Townsville	1964-	19.2722°S 146.8105°E	At 36 Boundary Street. Both sites were operational in 1964 during the transition.
William Ross State High School	Annandale	Townsville	1991		

=== Other state schools ===
This includes special schools (schools for disabled children) and schools for specific purposes.

Name	Suburb	LGA	Opened	Notes
Burdekin School	Ayr	Burdekin	1972	
Charters Towers School of Distance Education	Charters Towers	Charters Towers	1987	
Cleveland Education and Training Centre	Belgian Gardens	Townsville	1994	For juvenile inmates. Formerly Cleveland School until Feb 2006
Mackay District Special School	Beaconsfield	Mackay	1987	Formerly Kewarra until Aug 2002
Townsville Community Learning Centre	Mundingburra	Townsville	2002	

=== Defunct state schools ===
Name	Suburb	LGA	Opened	Closed	Coords	Notes
Airdmillan State School	Airdmillan	Burdekin	1912	1986		
Aitkenvale Special School	Aitkenvale	Townsville	1972	2001		Merged into Townsville Community Learning Centre
Ana Branch State School	Jarvisfield	Charters Towers	1919	1964		Described as "via Ayr" and "in the parish of Morrill" so referring to the anabranch of the Burdekin River. Ana Branch Road is in Jarvisfield.
Andromache Provisional School	Andromache	Whitsunday	circa 1891	circa 1893		Andromache Provisional School opened circa 1891 and closed circa 1893.
Andromache River Prosivional School	Andromache	Whitsunday	1927	1928		Andromache River Prosivional School opened in 1927 and closed in 1928.
Balfe's Creek State School	Balfes Creek (Campaspe)	Charters Towers	1905	1967		
Ballara State School	Ballara(within Kuridala)	Cloncurry	1919	1925		Ballara (20.9458°S 139.9633°E) is the now abandoned ruins of a settlement that supported the Wee MacGregor Mine.
Balnagowan State School	Balnagowan	Mackay	1950	1973	21.1226°S 149.0298°E	Located on a 5-acre (2.0 ha) site at 12 Coxs Road.
Bambaroo State School	Bambaroo	Hinchinbrook	1924	2016	18.8679°S 146.1889°E	Located at 10 Bambaroo School Road. The school's website has been archived.
Beatrice Creek State School	via Pinnacle	Mackay	1936	c. 1971		
Black Jack State School	Black Jack (now Broughton)	Charters Towers	1887	1949	approx 20.1362°S 146.2182°E	Located north of the Butler Blocks Mine to the east of Diamantina Road, now within the neighbouring locality of Broughton.
Blue Mountain State School	Blue Mountain	Mackay	1943	1963	approx 21.5736°S 149.0254°E	Located on Blue Mountain Road.
Bogie Range Provisional School	Bogie	Whitsunday Region	1919	1922		Originally known as Twenty-five Mile Camp Provisional School and Aberdeen Provisional School
Bona Vista State School	Proserpine	Whitsunday	1906	1964		
Bora Creek State School			1916	1920		Ravenswood area? Or possibly Captains Mountain near Milmerran?
Braemeadows State School	Braemeadows	Hinchinbrook	1928	1969	18.62953°S 146.26186°E	Located on a 3-acre (1.2 ha) site on the southern side of Four Mile Road commencing at the junction with Robinos and extending eastwards .
Brightley State School	Brightly	Mackay	1925	1988	21.2588°S 148.9196°E	At 1843 Mirani Eton Road. The school building is now used as a private residence. Note the spelling of the school name differs from the locality name
Brookville State School	via Ravenswood		1901	1926		
Broughton Road Provisional School	near Millchester	Charters Towers	circa 1895	circa 1896		Broughton Road runs south-west from Millchester.
Broughton State School	Broughton near Charters Towers	Charters Towers	1905	1930	in the vicinity of 20.1118°S 146.4198°E	Opened as a provisional school in 1905, becoming a state school in 1909. Closed due to low attendances in 1930. The buildings were sold for removal in 1934. The precise location of the school is unclear, but the mines which motivated its establishment were located in the Broughton township area immediately north of the Broughton River near its confluence with the Burdekin River.
Burdekin Bridge Tent State School	near Ayr	Burdekin	1912	1913		In June 1912, approval was given for a tent school provided the Railway Department supplied the tent. In November 1913, the teacher Miss Dean was reassigned to Gumlu State School. The Railway Department were constructing a rail bridge over the Burdekin River near Ayr in 1912–1913; the tent school was presumably for the children of the railway workers living in a temporary camp by the bridge site.
Burdekin Falls State School	Mount Wyatt	Whitsunday	1984	1988		
Cameron's Pocket State School	Camerons Pocket (Calen)	Mackay	1930	1958	20.9202°S 148.7278°E	Located at 375 Calen Mount Charlton Road.
Cannon Vale Provisional School	Cannonvale	Whitsunday	1892	circa 1908		Replaced by Cannon Valley State School at a different location.
Cannon Valley State School	Cannonvale	Whitsunday	1910	1969	20.2890°S 148.6784°E	Located on the north-eastern corner of Shute Harbour Road and Abell Road. Despite its name, it was not in present-day Cannon Valley. Replaced by Cannonvale State School at a different location.
Cape River State School	Pentland	Charters Towers	1915	1938		
Capeville State School	Capeville near Pentland	Charters Towers	circa 1895	1912		Opened circa 1895 as Deep Lead Provision School near the Capeville pastoral run on the Cape River near Pentland. Deep Lead was a gold mining area along the Cape River. Became Deep Lead State School in September 1909. Renamed Capeville State School in 1909 and then closed in 1912.
Charters Towers School of the Air	Charters Towers	Charters Towers	1964	1973		
Cootharinga Special School	Castle Hill	Townsville	1964	1986		
Cordelia State School	Cordelia	Hinchinbrook	1918	1993	18.5964°S 146.2591°E	Located at 15 Cordelia School Road.
Crediton State School	Crediton	Mackay	1943	1968		Crediton Provisional School opened on 18 October 1943. It became a State School in 1956 and closed in 1968.
Crediton West State School	Crediton	Mackay	1951	1961		
Crystal Creek State School	Crystal Creek	Whitsunday	1916	1967		Provisional until 1921; closed 1948, 1951–1956
Dalbeg State School	Dalbeg	Burdekin	1955	1999	20.2708°S 147.2952°E	Located at 45–63 Delpratt Street.
Dalrymple Heights State School	Dalrymple Heights	Mackay	1937	1959	21.0983°S 148.5216°E	Located at 686 Dalrymple Road.
Devereux/Devereaux Creek State School	Devereux Creek	Mackay	1903	1970	approx 21.12235°S 148.90707°E	Located on the northern side of Devereux Creek Road.
Dittmer State School	Dittmer	Whitsunday	1938	1965	approx 20.4504°S 148.4031°E	Located at approx 11 Thorogood Street.
Dobbyn State School	Three Rivers	Cloncurry	1918	1954		
Dows Creek State School	Dows Creek	Mackay	1895	2009	21.1041°S 148.7735°E	Located at 1081 Mount Ossa Road. The school's website was archived.
Duchess State School	Duchess	Cloncurry	1911	1983		
Dumbleton State School	Dumbleton	Mackay	1926	1949		
Dutton River State School	Dutton River	Flinders	1972	1977	approx 20.4334°S 143.8601°E	Located near the Charlotte Plains homestead.
Elaroo State School	Elaroo (now Bloomsbury)	Whitsunday	1936	1969	20.7874°S 148.6168°E	Elaroo Provisional School opened on 30 March 1936. It became Elaroo State School in 1955. It closed in 1969. It was immediately south of the Elaroo railway station at 21 Wales Road.
Etowri State School	Habana	Mackay	1926	1953	21.04789°S 149.11483°E	Located at 108 Barcoo Road.
Evolution State School	Ravenswood	Charters Towers	1885	1921		Originally known as Sandy Creek State School.
Ewan State School	Ewan (now Paluma)	Townsville Charters Towers	1907	circa 1931		Very little information available about this school.
Foresthome State School	Foresthome	Hinchinbrook	1935	1993	18.60682°S 146.20223°E	Located at 571 Halifax Road. As at 2022, the school sign remains extant on the site.
Foxdale State School	Foxdale	Whitsunday	1904	1972		
Gainsford Homestead School	(now Basalt)	Charters Towers	1942	1942		Very little known about this school, which operated for a year in the Gainsford Homestead building at the old Dalrymple township site. It may have been a private school.
Gilliat State School	Gilliat	Mckinlay	1931	1942?		
Grass Tree Provisional School	Grasstree Beach	Mackay	circa 1892	1905	21.36105°S 149.29597°E	Located on the north-eastern side of Haden Street.
Greenvale Project No. 1 State School	Greenvale	Charters Towers	1974	1974		Opened 18 Feb 1974 and closed on 29 Mar 1974
Greenvale Project No. 2 State School	Greenvale	Charters Towers	1972	1974		
Gunpowder State School	Gunpowder	Mount Isa	1970	1999		Closed 1982–1991
Guthalungra State School	Guthalungra	Whitsunday	1948	1988	19.8333°S 147.7000°E	Provisional until 28 February 1957. Located on the north side of the Bruce Highway in the town.
Habana State School	Habana	Mackay	1917	1960	21.03168°S 149.06852°E	Located at 863 Yakapari Road.19.8333°S 147.7000°E
Hawkins Creek State School	Hawkins Creek	Hinchinbrook	1912	2003	18.6122°S 146.0945°E	Sometimes written as Hawkin's Creek State School. Located at 18 Gortons Road.
Helens Hill State School	Helens Hill	Hinchinbrook	1931	2016	18.7690°S 146.1352°E	Located at 48388 Bruce Highway The school's website was archived.
Hermit Park Special School	Hermit Park	Townsville	1979	1980		
Hermit Park State Infants' School	Hermit Park	Townsville	1955	1993		Merged into Hermit Park SS
Hightville State School	Hightville (now in Kuridala)	Cloncurry	1915	1920		
Hillside State School	near Sarina		1909	1926		
Horseshoe Bay State School	Horseshoe Bay	Townsville (Offshore)	1949	1972		
Idalia Provisional School	Idalia	Townsville	1931	1939		
Ingham Special School	Ingham	Hinchinbrook	1971	1992		
Inkerman State School	Inkerman	Burdekin	1915	1974	19.7513°S 147.4935°E	Located at 22 Wallace Road.
Inverdon Road State School	Bowen	Whitsunday	1922	1955	19.9896°S 148.2119°E	Located at 174 Inverdon Road.
Iona State School	Osborne	Burdekin	1928	1963	approx 19.7121°S 147.4025°E	Located on the north-west corner of Iona Road and Bapty Road.
Iyah State School	Fredericksfield	Burdekin	1920	1963	19.7102°S 147.4491°E	Located approximately at 13 Charlies Hill Road.
Jaggan State School	Jaggan	Tablelands	1918	1965		
Kajabbi State School	Kajabbi	Cloncurry	1919	1975		
Kalkadoon State High School	Pioneer	Mount Isa	1977	2002	20.7223°S 139.5099°E	Located at 145–163 Abel Smith Parade. Merged with Mount Isa State High School to create Spinifex State College. The senior campus of the new college occupies the former Kalkadoon State High School site. Kalkadoon State High School's website has been archived.
Kelsey Creek State School	Kelsey Creek	Whitsunday	1895	1963		Provisional until 1909
King's Gully State School	Broughton	Charters Towers	1911	1932		Kings Gully and Kings Gully Road are both in Broughton.
Kirk River State School	in western Ravenswood	Charters Towers	1890	1944		Kirk River and Kirk River Road are both in Ravenswood.
Koolamarra State School	Koolamarra (now Cloncurry)	Cloncurry	1915	1971		
Kungurri State School	Kungurri (now Dows Creek)	Mackay	1932	1963		
Kuridala State School	Kuridala	Cloncurry	1901	1932		formerly Friezland SS until 1920
Kynuna State School	Kynuna	McKinlay	1899	1992		
Laburnum Grove Provisional School	near Sarina		1915	c.1941		Originally named Middle Creek Provisional School
Lake Julius State School	Lake Julius	Mount Isa	1973	1976		
Lannercost State School	Lannercost	Hinchinbrook	1929	1962	18.6410°S 146.0299°E	Located on Lannercost Extension Road near the junction with Venables Crossing Road.
Lethebrook State School	Lethebrook	Whitsunday	1922	1964	20.53814°S 148.65007°E	Banana Pocket Provisional School opened on 25 May 1922. In 1926, it became Banana Pocket State School. In 1949, it was renamed Lethebrook State School. It closed on 15 June 1964. It was at 7 Walsh Road.
Liontown State School	Liontown (now Campaspe)	Charters Towers	1906	1914		
Long Pocket State School	Long Pocket (now in Lannercost)	Hinchinbrook	1915	1994	18.5419°S 146.0194°E	Located at 2062 Abergowrie Road, now in Lannercost.
Lower Gregory State School	in southern Gregory River	Whitsunday	1922	1962		
Lucinda Point State School	Lucinda	Hinchinbrook	1896	2008	18.5306°S 146.3339°E	Originally opened Dungeness Provisional School in 1896, relocated to Lucinda Point in 1897 and renamed Lucinda Point Provisional School in 1898. Located at 20 Patterson Parade (corner Waring Street). The school's website was archived.
McDesme State School	McDesme	Burdekin	1905	1965	19.61550°S 147.40058°E	McDesme Provisional School opened in 1905. On 1 January 1909, it became McDesme State School. It closed circa 1964. The school was on a 5-acre (2.0 ha) site on the south-east corner of McDesme Road and Old Home Hill Road
Mackay Central State Infants School	Mackay	Mackay	1960	1968		Merged with Mackay Central SS
Mackay Special School	Mackay	Mackay	1981	1997		Merged with Kewarra Special
Mackay West State Infants School	West Mackay	Mackay	1956	1994	21.1517°S 149.1643°E	Split from and then merged back in Mackay West State School. Located at 364 Bridge Road.
Macrossan State School	Macrossan (now Dotswood)	Charters Towers	1884	1948		Originally called Macrossan Bridge Provisional School from 1884 to 1903 then changed name to Burdekin Provisional School. In 1917 it took on its final name.
Majors Creek State School	Majors Creek	Burdekin	1933	2009	19.5985°S 146.9015°E	Located at 54 Majors Creek Road.
Malbon State School	Malbon	Cloncurry	1911	1969	21.0754°S 140.3019°E	The school was located at the southern end of town on a 2-acre (0.81 ha) site on Malbon Selwyn Road.
Manton State School	Manton (now in Woodstock)	Townsville	1903	1946	19.65338°S 146.83664°E	The school was on a 5-acre (2.0 ha) site at 4073 Burdekin Highway (now Flinders Highway in neighbouring Woodstock).
Mary Kathleen State School	Mary Kathleen	Cloncurry	1956	1983		Opened on 9 July 1956 and closed on 24 June 1983.
Maxwelton State School	Maxwelton	Richmond	1923	1989	20.7217°S 142.6816°E	Located in School Road. The school building is now used as a house.
McKinlay State School	McKinlay	McKinlay	1897	1986		
Melrose Provisional School	near Bowen		c.1877	c.1896		This school was located on the property of the same name, owned and operated by Sidney Yeates. It was a rough bark and slab structure with bark for a roof.
Mia Mia State School	Mia Mia	Mackay	1899	circa 1913		The school building was relocated to a new site circa 1913.
Mia Mia State School	Mia Mia	Mackay	circa 1913	1967	21.22383°S 148.81199°E	Located on the north of the bend in the Mia Mia Connection Road.
Mingela State School	Mingela	Charters Towers	1882	2002	19.8812°S 146.6336°E	Known as Ravenswood Junction until 1931. Located at 33 Burdekin Street. The school's website was archived.
Mount Charlton State School	Mount Charlton	Mackay	1931	2009	21.0222°S 148.7296°E	Located at 2342 Mirani-Mount Ossa Road. The school's website was archived.
Mount Chelona State School	near Sarina		1937	c.1941		
Mount Christian State School	Mount Christian (now Koumala)	Mackay	1925	1968		
Mount Cobalt State School	Selwyn	Cloncurry	1924	1926		Mount Cobalt was a mine in Selwyn.
Mount Coolon State School	Mount Coolon	Whitsunday	1921	1967		Provisional until May 1963
Mount Dalrymple State School	Dalrymple Heights	Mackay	1904	1963		
Mount Isa State High School	Parkside	Mount Isa	1953	2002	20.7348°S 139.4871°E	Located at 6–16 Fifth Avenue. Merged with Kalkadoon State High School to create Spinifex State College. The junior campus of the new college occupies the former Mount Isa State High School site. Mount Isa State High School's website has been archived.
Mount Jukes State School	Mount Jukes	Mackay	1926	1967		
Mount Leyshon State School	Mount Leyshon (now Seventy Mile)	Charters Towers	1890	c.1940?		
Mount Marlow State School	Mount Marlow	Whitsunday	1900	1954		
Mount Martin State School	Mount Martin	Mackay	1906	1961		
Mount Ossa State School	Mount Ossa	Mackay	1938	1970	20.9582°S 148.8344°E	In 1938, the Silent Grove Provisional School closed, being replaced by the Mount Ossa State School. Located on Mount Ossa School Road.
Mount Pelion State School	Mount Pelion	Mackay	1924	1970	20.9298°S 148.8143°E	Provisional until Aug 1926. Located about 19 Bogga Road.
Mount Proserpine State School	Conway	Whitsunday	1938	1963		
Mount Surround State School	Mount Surround	Burdekin	1932	1968	approx 19.51717°S 147.05708°E	Located on the northern corner of Reed Beds Road and Piralko Road.
Munbura State School	Munbura	Mackay	1920	1971	approx 21.34243°S 149.14500°E	Munbura State School opened on 16 August 1920. It closed in December 1971. It was on the eastern side of Boyds Road, south of the railway station.
Mundingburra Special School	Mundingburra	Townsville	1981	2001		Formerly Mundingburra South until Jan 1987. Merged into Townsville Community Learning Centre
Narpi State School	Narpi (now Kuttabul)	Mackay	1926	2005	20.9998°S 148.8753°E	Located at 69 Narpi Road.
Nelia State School	Nelia	McKinlay	1926	1960		
Netherdale State School	Netherdale	Mackay	1914	1963		
Nindaroo State School	Nindaroo (now in Richmond)	Mackay	1899	1963	21.08220°S 149.14186°E	Located at 1 Boveys Road, corner of Mackay Habana Road, now within neighbouring Richmond.
Nonda State School	Nonda	Richmond	1925	1975	20.6813°S 142.4857°E	Located in Corella Street.
Norwood State School	Norwood (now in Pentland)	Charters Towers	1920	1952		
O'Connell River State School	Yalboroo	Mackay	1937	1960	20.8632°S 148.6196°E	Located to the west of the junction of Cathu O'Connell Road and Frys Road.
Oolbun State School	Oolbun (now Nome)	Townsville	1917	c.1932		Very little information available about this school.
Oona State School	Oona (now Three Rivers)	Cloncurry	c.1917	c.1920		Very little information available about this school.
Owens Creek State School	Owens Creek	Mackay	1913	1967		Provisional until 1918
Palm Grove State School	Palm Grove	Whitsunday	1916	1951	20.40534°S 148.70014°E	Palm Groves State School opened on 14 August 1916, but closed in 1918 due to low student numbers. On 27 January 1926, it reopened. In 1933, the name was changed to Palm Grove State School. It closed permanently in December 1951. It was at 287 Saltwater Creek Road.
Paluma State School	Paluma	Townsville/Charters Towers	1950	1968		Originally opened as Paluma Temporary School, it became a State School in 1952. Has been confused with Running River State School, but they are separate schools (see Running River State School below)
Pandanus Creek State School	north-western Ravenswood	Charters Towers	1908	1926		Pandanus Creek is a tributary of the Kirk River in north-western Ravenswood.
Peacock Siding State School	Peacock Siding	Hinchinbrook	1929	1949	approx 18.67945°S 145.99947°E	Stonevale State School opened on 4 February 1929 under teacher Miss Gay. Circa 1937, it was renamed Peacock Siding State School. It closed in 1949. It was on the eastern side of Stone River Road.
Picnic Bay State School	Picnic Bay, Magnetic Island	Townsville (Offshore)	1917	1970	19.177°S 146.8395°E	Known as Magnetic Island State School until September 1925. At 11–15 Granite Street. Later used as the Magnetic Island Craft Shop and the Magnetic Island Museum.
Pleystowe State School	Pleystowe	Mackay	1896	1914		Pleystowe Provisional School opened on 15 April 1896 on a 3-acre (1.2 ha) site on the Green Nob. The site was described as "a most imposing one for a school and the view from the crest of the Nob and the exhilarating breeze one gets on reaching it well repays for the little climb".
Pleystowe State School	Pleystowe	Mackay	1914	1961	approx 21.14340°S 149.02604°E	In 1914, it was decided to relocate and enlarge the school. The school was on the south-western corner of the Mackay-Eungella Road and Pleystowe School Road.
Plane Creek West State School	West Plane Creek (now Sarina)	Mackay	1900	1969		Plane Creek, Upper Provisional School opened 19 February 1900 and became Plane Creek, Upper State school in 1909. In 1928 the school name was changed to Plane Creek, West (later without comma before West) and the school closed in 1969.
Pumping Station State School	Breddan	Charters Towers	1898	1936		
Quamby State School	Quamby	Cloncurry	1924	1969		
Queenton State School	Queenton	Charters Towers	1891	1931		
Rangemore State School	Rangemore	Burdekin	1913	1962		
Reid River State School	Reid River	Townsville (R)	1948	1966		
Riordan Vale State School	Riordanvale	Whitsunday	1939	1963	20.2905°S 148.6463°E	Riordan Vale Provisional School opened on 22 May 1939. It became Riordan Vale State School in 1955. It closed in 1963. It was at 333 Riordanvale Road.
Ripple Creek State School	Ripple Creek (now in Bemerside)	Hinchinbrook	1893	1995	18.5796°S 146.2053°E	Located on Fulton Drive.
Rise and Shine State School	Rise and Shine (now Yalboroo)	Mackay	1936	1963	20.8888°S 148.6628°E	Located at 2 Watson and Boyds Road (corner Holds Road).
Rita Island State School	Rita Island	Burdekin	1920	1967		
Rishton State School	Rishton (now Dotswood)	Charters Towers	1884	1891		Rishton was the area on the eastern bank of the Burdekin River where it is cross by the Burdekin River Rail Bridge. It was renamed Oombabia in 1890. It is now the south-western corner of Dotswood.
Rochford State School	Rochford (now Ravenswood)	Charters Towers	1892	1921		
Running River State School	Hidden Valley (now Paluma)	Townsville/Charters Towers	1946	1994	18.9777°S 146.0262°E	Closed in 1949 and opened again in 1954. Closed in 1963 and opened in 1965. Closed in 1974 and opened in 1978. Finally closed in 1994. Located at 28 Furber Road (also known as Breakaway Road and Ewan Road) in Paluma; it was a 5-acre (2.0 ha) site with a frontage onto Running River.
Sandiford State School	Sandiford	Mackay	1908	1992	21.24761°S 149.09981°E	Located at 517 Homebush Road. As at 2008, the school building was still on the site.
Sellheim State School	Sellheim	Charters Towers	1889	1939	approx 20.0068°S 146.4156°E	Located on the eastern side of School Street close to the junction with the Flinders Highway.
Septimus State School	Septimus	Mackay	1904	1999	21.2043°S 148.7642°E	Located at 888–892 Gargett Mia Mia Road.
Silent Grove Provisional School	Mount Charlton	Mackay	1928	1938		Closed to establish Mount Ossa State School.
Silent Grove Upper State School	Mount Charlton	Mackay	1936	circa 1964	20.9891°S 148.7684°E	Located at 2948 Mirani-Mount Ossa Road.
Shirbourne State School	Shirbourne	Burdekin	1931	1970	19.5567°S 147.0853°E	Located at 628 Shirbourne Road .
Stamford State School	Stamford	Flinders	1984	2013	21.2658°S 143.8083°E	Stamford State School opened on 23 January 1984. It closed on Located at 5 Marathon Stamford Road. The school's website was partially archived.
Stone State School	Upper Stone	Hinchinbrook	1909	1993	18.7251°S 145.9623°E	Located at 1887 Stone River Road.
Strathdickie State School	Strathdickie	Whitsunday	1906	1962	20.3284°S 148.6058°E	Strathdickie Provisional School opened on 25 June 1906. On 1 January 1909, it became Strathdickie State School. It closed on 1 June 1962. It was at 869–875 Gregory Cannon Valley Road.
Stuart State School	Stuart	Townsville	1901	2013	19.34793°S 146.84179°E	Originally called Stewart's Creek, renamed Stuart in 1939. Located at 10 Dwyer Street. Its website was partially archived.
Sunnyside State School	Sunnyside	Mackay	1896	1911	approx 21.3465°S 149.0812°E	Scrubby Mount Provisional School opened on 3 February 1896. On 1 January 1909, it became Scrubby Mount State School. It was near the intersection of Sarina-Homebush Road and Marwood-Sunnyside Road.
Sunnyside State School	Sunnyside	Mackay	1911	1960	approx 21.3679°S 149.0950°E	In 1911, the school was relocated to a new site and, in 1912, it was renamed Sunnyside State School. It closed on 31 December 1960. Sunnyside State School was on western side of Sarina-Homebush Road.
Sybil Creek State School	Owens Creek	Mackay	1921	1965		Sybil Creek runs north of Cattle Creek in Owens Creek.
Te Kowai State School	Te Kowai	Mackay	1883	1968	21.1659°S 149.1273°E	Located at 5 Te Kowai Foulden Road.
The Leap State School	The Leap	Mackay	1893	1969	21.0700°S 149.00847°E	Located at 2105 Maraju Yakapari Road.
The Monument State School	The Monument	Cloncurry	1976	1994		
Torrens Creek State School	Torrens Creek	Flinders	1891	1991	20.7673°S 145.0198°E	Located at 2 Bedford Street.
Torsdale Farm Provisional School	near Mackay		1919	1920		Was a half-time school in conjunction with Torsdale Station Provisional School. Should not be confused with Torsdale Farm Provisional School, later known as Torsdale Farm State School, near Biloela, which opened in 1935 and changed name in 1944 to Prospect Creek State School.
Torsdale Station Provisional School	near Mackay		1919	1920		Was a half-time school in conjunction with Torsdale Farm Provisional School.
Townsville Hospital Special School	North Ward	Townsville	1974	1994		Townsville Hospital is located in North Ward.
Townsville West Special School	West End	Townsville	1958	1992		
Ukalunda State School	Mount Wyatt	Whitsunday	1903	1924		
Victoria Park State Infants School	Mackay	Mackay	1970	1994		Merged with Victoria Park State School
Wagoora State School	Wagoora (now Pindi Pindi)	Mackay	1949	1963	20.8460°S 148.7058°E	Located at 5 Foxs Road.
Walluma State School			1900	1912		Originally known as Gregory State School. There is a Gregory parish and a Wallum Creek in Farnsfield.
Windermere State School	Cannon Valley	Whitsunday	1922	1942	20.3235°S 148.6539°E	Located on the south-eastern corner of Shute Harbour Road and Cannon Valley Road.
Whitewood State School	Whitewood (now Stamford)	Flinders	1961	1970		Whitewood is now in Stamford.
Yalboroo State School	Yalboroo	Mackay	1927	2000	20.8365°S 148.6498°E	Originally opened as Yalboroo Siding Provisional School. Located at 6885 Bruce Highway.
Yuruga State School	Yuruga	Hinchinbrook	1919	1994	18.8353°S 146.1552°E	Opened as Waterview State School, renamed Yuruga State School in 1930. Located at 20 Yuruga School Road.

== Private schools ==
=== Catholic schools ===
In Queensland, Catholic primary schools are usually (but not always) linked to a parish. Prior to the 1970s, most schools were founded by religious institutes, but with the decrease in membership of these institutes, together with major reforms inside the church, lay teachers and administrators began to take over the schools, a process which completed by approximately 1990.

Within the region, schools in the Mackay Region are administered by Catholic Education Office, Diocese of Rockhampton, which was established in 1966 and was the first Catholic Education Office (CEO) in Queensland. All others are administered by the Catholic Education Office, Diocese of Townsville. Both are supported by the Queensland Catholic Education Commission, which is responsible for coordinating administration, curriculum and policy across the Catholic school system. Preference for enrolment is given to Catholic students from the parish or local area, although non-Catholic students are admitted if room is available.

Name	Suburb	LGA	M/F/Co-ed	Years	Opened	Coords	Notes
Burdekin Catholic High School	Ayr	Burdekin	Co-ed	7–12	1974		
Catherine McAuley College	Mackay	Mackay	Co-ed	7–12	2022		
Columba Catholic College	Charters Towers	Charters Towers	Co-ed	P–12	1998		
Emmanuel Catholic Primary School	Mount Pleasant	Mackay	Co-ed	P–6	1983		P–10 until 1994
Gilroy Santa Maria College	Ingham	Hinchinbrook	Co-ed	7–12	1973	18.6445°S 146.1555°E	Merger of Gilroy (boys) and Santa Maria (girls). At 17 Chamberlain Street.
Good Shepherd Catholic College	Menzies	Mount Isa	Co-ed	7–12	1985	20.7220°S 139.4945°E	Merger of St Kieran's (boys) and San Jose (girls). On the corner of Mary and Camooweal Streets.
Good Shepherd Catholic Community School	Rasmussen	Townsville	Co-ed	P–6	1996		
Holy Spirit Catholic School	Cranbrook	Townsville	Co-ed	P–6	1969	19.3021°S 146.7556°E	On Hatchett Street.
Holy Spirit College	Mount Pleasant	Mackay	Co-ed	7–12	1995		Formerly part of Emmanuel College
Ignatius Park College	Cranbrook	Townsville	M	7–12	1969	19.2995°S 146.7572°E	At 368-384 Ross River Road.
MacKillop Catholic Primary School	Andergrove	Mackay	Co-ed	P–6	1995		
Marian Catholic School	Currajong	Townsville	Co-ed	P–6	1988		
Mary Help of Christians Catholic College	Shaw	Townsville	Co-ed	7-12	2025	19.2902°S 146.7012°E	At 1 Bishop Putney Avenue.
Mount Isa Flexible Learning Centre	Mount Isa	Mount Isa	Co-ed	7–12			Operated by Edmund Rice Foundation.
Our Lady of Lourdes Catholic School	Ingham	Hinchinbrook	Co-ed	P–6	1914	18.6538°S 146.1592°E	At 18 Abbott Street.
Ryan Catholic College	Kirwan	Townsville	Co-ed	P–12	1979		
Southern Cross Catholic College	Annandale	Townsville	Co-ed	P–12	1998		
St Anne's Catholic Primary School	Sarina	Mackay	Co-ed	P–6	1925		
St Anthony's Catholic College	Deeragun	Townsville	Co-ed	P–12	1992		
St Benedict's Catholic School	Shaw	Townsville	Co-ed	P–6			
St Brendan's Catholic Primary School	Rural View	Mackay	Co-ed	P–6	2015	21.0527°S 149.1608°E	At 799 Mackay-Bucasia Road.
St Catherine's College	Proserpine	Whitsunday	Co-ed	primary	1925–2012	20.4039°S 148.5857°E	Opened as a primary school in 1925 as St Catherine's Catholic School on the northern side of Marathon Street, opposite Telia Street.
St Catherine's College	Proserpine	Whitsunday	Co-ed	P-12	2012-	20.4105°S 148.5899°E	In 2012, the school relocated to a new larger campus known as St Catherine's Catholic College, enabling the school to provide secondary education. At 96 Renwick Road.
St Clare's Catholic School	Burdell	Townsville	Co-ed	P–6	2011	19.2577°S 146.7044°E	On Burdell Drive.
St Colman's School	Home Hill	Burdekin	Co-ed	P–6	1927		
St Francis's School	Ayr	Burdekin	Co-ed	P–6	1912		
St Francis's School	Hughenden	Flinders	Co-ed	P–6	1900	20.8461°S 144.2020°E	At 8 Flinders Street.
St Francis Xavier Catholic Primary School	West Mackay	Mackay	Co-ed	P–6	1935		
St John Bosco's School	Collinsville	Whitsunday	Co-ed	P–6	1936		
St John's Catholic School	Walkerston	Mackay	Co-ed	P–6	1924		
St Joseph's Catholic Primary School	North Mackay	Mackay	Co-ed	P–6	1936	21.1226°S 149.1868°E	At 4 Canberra Street.
St Joseph's Catholic School	Mundingburra	Townsville	Co-ed	P–6	1924		
St Joseph's Catholic School	Cloncurry	Cloncurry	Co-ed	P–9	1908		
St Joseph's Primary School	Parkside	Mount Isa	Co-ed	P–6	1932		
St Joseph's School	North Ward	Townsville	Co-ed	P–6	1873		
St Kieran's Primary School	Pioneer	Mount Isa	Co-ed	P–6	1985		Merger of two earlier schools
St Margaret Mary's College	Hyde Park	Townsville	F	7–12	1963		
St Mary's Catholic Primary School	South Mackay	Mackay	Co-ed	P–6	1924		
St Mary's Catholic School	Bowen	Whitsunday	Co-ed	P–6	1872		
St Michael's Catholic School	Palm Island	Palm Island	Co-ed	P–6	1945		
St Patrick's College	Mackay	Mackay	Co-ed	7–12	1929		Formerly St Patrick's CBC until 1986
St Patrick's College	North Ward	Townsville	F	7–12	1904		
St Peter's Catholic School	Halifax	Hinchinbrook	Co-ed	P–6	1927		Formerly St Theresa's Convent until 1969
St Teresa's College	Abergowrie	Hinchinbrook	M	7–12	1933	18.4803°S 145.8995°E	At 3819 Abergowrie Road.
Townsville Flexible Learning Centre	West End	Townsville	Co-ed	7–12	2006		Alternative, Operated by Edmund Rice Foundation.

=== Independent schools ===
Name	Suburb	LG	M/F/Co-ed	Years	Category	Opened	Coordinates	Notes
All Souls St Gabriel's School	Richmond Hill	Charters Towers	Co-ed	P–12	Anglican	1990		Merger of All Souls School and St Gabriel's School
Annandale Christian College	Annandale	Townsville	Co-ed	P–12	Christian	1982		
Blackheath & Thornburgh College	Richmond Hill	Charters Towers	Co-ed	P–12	Uniting	1978		Merger of Blackheath College and Thornburgh College
Burdekin Christian College	Ayr	Burdekin	Co-ed	P–12	Christian	1982		
Calvary Christian College	Mount Louisa	Townsville	Co-ed	P–12	Assembly of God	1978		
Carinity Education	Condon	Townsville	Co-ed	P–12	Christian Aboriginal	1992		Alternative, Formerly Shalom Christian College
Carlisle Adventist College	Mackay	Mackay	Co-ed	P–12	Adventist	1951–2005		In Mackay.
Carlisle Adventist College	Beaconsfield	Mackay	Co-ed	P–12	Adventist	2006-	21.1006°S 149.1644°E	At 17 Holts Road.
Eaton College	Mount Louisa	Townsville	Co-ed	P–6	Assembly of God	2023		Special School.
Enkindle Village School	Douglas	Townsville	Co-ed	P–6	Independent			
Hinchinbrook Christian School	Ingham	Hinchinbrook	Co-ed	P–10	Baptist	1984	18.6387°S 146.1676°E	At 77 Halifax Road.
Kutta Mulla Gorinna Special Assistance School	Mackay	Mackay	Co-ed	7–12				Special School.
Mackay Christian College	North Mackay	Mackay	Co-ed	P–5	Christian	1984	21.1139°S 149.1772°E	Prep-5 campus at 17 Ambrose Way.
Mackay Christian College	North Mackay	Mackay	Co-ed	6–12	Christian	1984	21.1150°S 149.1824°E	Years 6-12 campus at 9 Quarry Street.
Mungalla Silver Lining School	Cluden	Townsville	Co-ed	7-12	Aboriginal			
Riverside Adventist Christian School	Aitkenvale	Townsville	Co-ed	P–6	Adventist	1967		
Silver Lining School			Co-ed		Aboriginal			
Tec-NQ	Douglas	Townsville	Co-ed	10–12	Independent	2007		Formerly Australian Technical College – North Queensland.
The Cathedral School of St Anne and St James	Townsville CBD	Townsville	Girls	P–12	Anglican	1917–1958		Opened as St Anne's Church of England School for Girls in Walker Street on the site of the current Townsville City Council building until 1958.
The Cathedral School of St Anne and St James	Mundingburra	Townsville	Co-ed	P–12	Anglican	1958–	19.2958°S 146.7790°E	Relocated to Mundingburra where it expanded into a full co-educational school and was renamed The Cadredral School of St Anne and St James. At 154–182 Ross River Road.
Townsville Christian College	Garbutt	Townsville	Co-ed	P–12	Christian	2007		Affiliated with Life Church Townsville
Townsville Grammar School	North Ward	Townsville	Co-ed	7–12	Independent	1888	19.25171°S 146.80628°E	The North Ward campus has the secondary (7–12) facilities at 45 Paxton Street.
Townsville Grammar School	Annandale	Townsville	Co-ed	Pre-Prep–6	Independent	1997	19.31597°S 146.79382°E	The Annandale campus was the first of the school's two primary (Pre-Prep–6) facilities at 1 Brazier Drive.
Townsville Grammar School	Burdell	Townsville	Co-ed	Pre-Prep–6	Independent	2015	19.2525°S 146.7045°E	The North Shore campus was the second of the school's two primary (Pre-Prep–6) facilities on the corner of Erskine Place and North Shore Boulevard.
Whitsunday Anglican School	Beaconsfield	Mackay	Co-ed	P–12	Anglican	1988		
Whitsunday Christian College	Cannonvale	Whitsunday	Co-ed	P–12	Christian	1997	20.2889°S 148.6747°E	At 26 Paluma Road.

=== Defunct private schools ===
Name	Suburb	LGA	Category	Years	Opened	Closed	Notes
All Souls' School	Charters Towers	Charters Towers	Anglican Boys	P–12	1920	1990	Merged into All Souls St Gabriel's School.
Blackheath College	Charters Towers	Charters Towers	Methodist/Presbyterian Girls	P–12	1920	1978	Merged into Blackheath and Thornburgh College.
Blessed Edmund Campion College	Ayr	Burdekin	Catholic	high	1953	1974	Merged into St Francis Xavier High School.
Canossa Primary School	Trebonne	Hinchinbrook	Catholic	Primary	1951	2013	
Gilroy College	Ingham	Hinchinbrook	Catholic boys	High	1949	1972	Merged into Gilroy Santa Maria College
Heritage High School	Townsville	Townsville	?	High	1978	1989	
Holy Family Primary School	Gulliver	Townsville	Catholic	Primary	1952	1987	Merged into The Marian School
Immaculate Heart of Mary School	Marian	Mackay	Catholic	Primary	1924	1989	
Mercy College	Mackay	Mackay	Catholic Girls/Co-ed	High	1930	2022	Formerly Our Lady of Mercy College until 1986. Merged into St Patrick's College, Mackay
Mount Carmel College	Charters Towers	Charters Towers	Catholic boys	High	1902	1997	Merged into Columba Catholic College
Mount Isa Christian College	Mount Isa	Mount Isa	Independent	High	1981	2008	
Our Lady's Mount College	Townsville	Townsville	Catholic boys	High	1911	1970	Moved and became Ignatius Park College
San Jose Secondary School	Mount Isa	Mount Isa	Catholic girls	Secondary	1964	1984	Merged into Good Shepherd Catholic College
St Columba's Primary School	Charters Towers	Charters Towers	Catholic	Primary	1876	1997	Merged into Columba Catholic College
St Gabriel's School	Charters Towers	Charters Towers	Anglican Girls	P–12	1921	1990	Merged into All Souls St Gabriel's School.
St John Fisher Christian Brothers College	Currajong	Townsville	Catholic boys	Primary	1952	1987	Merged into The Marian School
St Joseph's School	Giru	Burdekin	Catholic	Primary	1944	1998	
St Joseph's School	Julia Creek	McKinlay	Catholic	Primary	1955	1995	
St Kieran's Christian Brothers College	Mount Isa	Mount Isa	Catholic boys	Secondary	1960	1984	Merged into Good Shepherd Catholic College
St Margaret Mary's Primary School	Hermit Park	Townsville	Catholic girls	Primary	1936	1987	Merged into The Marian School
St Mary's College	Charters Towers	Charters Towers	Catholic girls	High	1882	1997	Merged into Columba Catholic College
St Mary's School	West End	Townsville	Catholic	Primary	1888	1995	Merged into The Marian School
Santa Maria College	Ingham	Hinchinbrook	Catholic girls	High	1949	1972	Merged into Gilroy Santa Maria College
Stella Maris College	Bowen	Whitsunday	Catholic girls	High	1885	1971	
Townsville Christian Academy	Townsville	Townsville	Ind. Christian	Primary	1983	1991	
Thornburgh College	Charters Towers	Charters Towers	Methodist/Presbyterian Boys	P–12	1919	1978	Merged into Blackheath and Thornburgh College.

== See also ==
- List of schools in Queensland
