= Shire of Mirani =

- Local government area
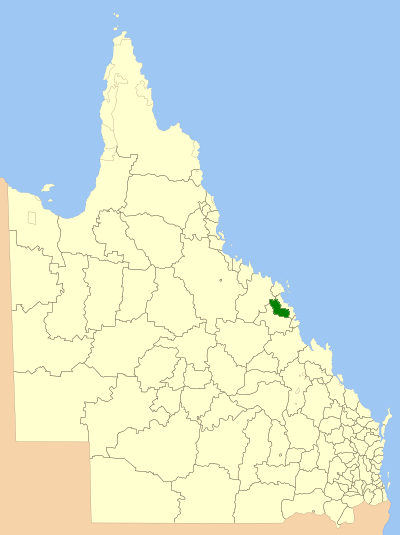
- Location within Queensland

- Country: Australia
- State: Queensland
- Region: North Queensland
- Established: 1913
- Council seat: Mirani

Area
  - Total: 3,280.2 km^{2} (1,266.5 sq mi)

Population
  - Total: 5,406 (2006 census)
  - Density: 1.64807/km^{2} (4.2685/sq mi)
LGAs around Shire of Mirani
Bowen	Whitsunday	Mackay
Bowen	Shire of Mirani	Mackay
Nebo	Nebo	Mackay

The Shire of Mirani was a local government area located in the North Queensland region of Queensland, Australia. The shire, administered from the town of Mirani, covered an area of 3,280.2 square kilometres (1,266.5 sq mi), and existed as a local government entity from 1916 until 2008, when it amalgamated with the City of Mackay and the Shire of Sarina to form the Mackay Region.

The shire was situated in the Pioneer Valley, and atop the Eungella Range, to the west of Mackay. The area's primary industry is sugar production.

== History ==
Pioneer Division was one of the 74 divisional boards established on 11 November 1879 under the Divisional Boards Act 1879 with a population of 2884 and covered the region surrounding but not including the Borough of Mackay. With the passage of the Local Authorities Act 1902, Pioneer Division became the Shire of Pioneer on 31 March 1903.

The Shire of Mirani was established from part of the Shire of Pioneer on 4 September 1913 under the Local Authorities Act 1902.

On 15 March 2008, under the Local Government (Reform Implementation) Act 2007 passed by the Parliament of Queensland on 10 August 2007, the Shire of Mirani merged with the City of Mackay and Shire of Sarina to form the Mackay Region.

== Towns and localities ==
The Shire of Mirani included the following settlements:

Towns:

- Mirani
- Dows Creek
- Eton
- Finch Hatton
- Gargett
- Marian
- North Eton
- Pinnacle
- Septimus

Localities:

- Benholme
- Crediton
- Dalrymple Heights
- Eungella
- Eungella Dam
- Hazledean
- Kinchant Dam
- Mia Mia
- Mount Martin
- Netherdale
- Owens Creek
- Pinevale

== Chairmen ==
- 1927: G. Johnson

== Population ==
Year	Population
1933	4,412
1947	4,587
1954	5,056
1961	4,760
1966	5,379
1971	4,772
1976	4,889
1981	4,739
1986	4,854
1991	4,625
1996	5,088
2001	5,220
2006	5,406
