= Mackay Railway =

Former railway line in Queensland, Australia

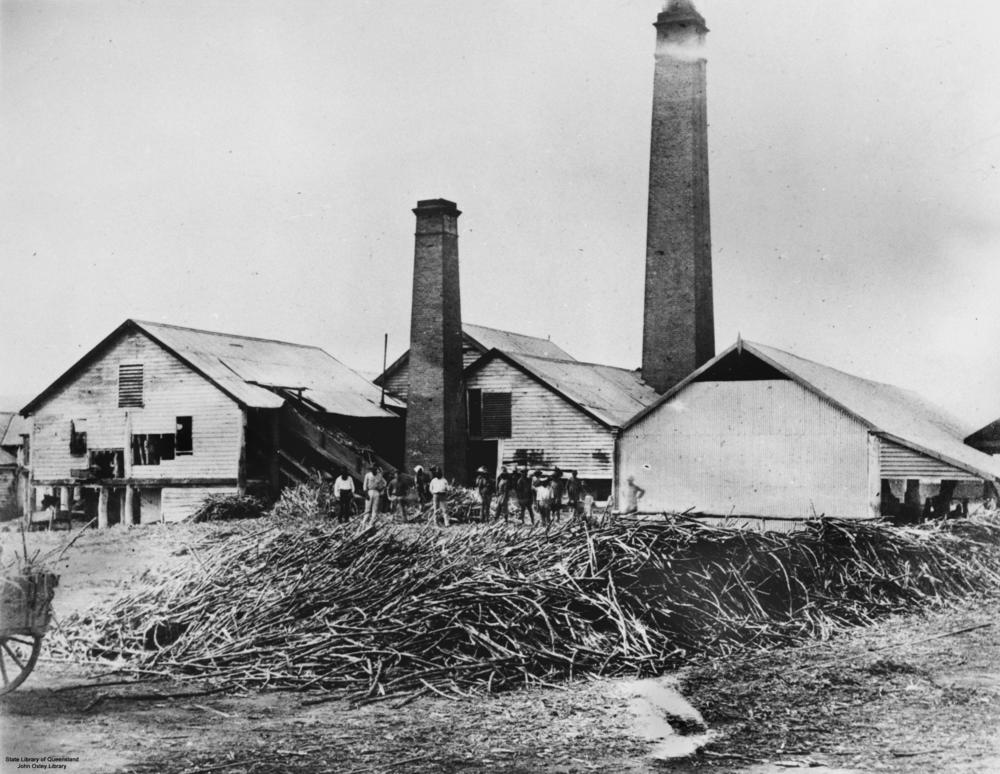
Pioneer Sugar Mill at Mackay, 1880s

The Mackay Railway was a 68 kilometres (42 mi) line situated in the Pioneer River valley in North Queensland, Australia. It opened in a series of sections between 1885 and 1911. It had three short branches, parts of which were initially built by the local government. It closed in sections between 1959 and circa 2007. It was also known as the Pioneer Valley Railway.

== History ==
Mackay, about 1000 km north of Brisbane, is situated at the entrance of a fertile river valley, and was quickly developed for agriculture, especially sugar cane. Sugar mills had been constructed with private cane tramways, meaning each mill had a local monopoly.

The Mackay railway was built to allow growers to ship their sugar cane to alternative buyers, ending the mill monopolies.

=== Early lines ===
The first section opened from Mackay to Eton, the only other town in the region at the time, together with a branch from Newbury Junction to Mirani, 36 km in total, in 1885. The "branch line" from Mirani was extended 16 km west to Pinnacle between 1897 and 1902, and traffic grew to the point where it became regarded as the main line, and Eton as the branch line. The Queensland Government built two sugar mills as part of the development, and in due course most mills became cooperatively owned.

==== River Estate of John Spiller ====
River Estate of John Spiller
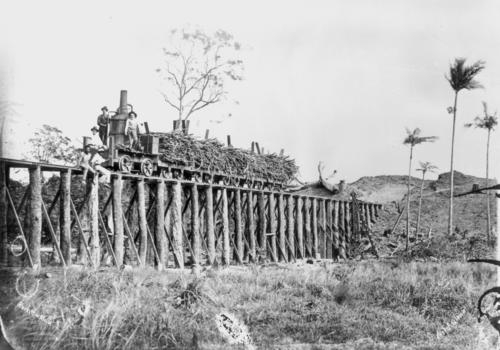
- John Spiller's first steam engine Mary Ann built by Robertson & Co at the Victoria Foundry, Mackay, in 1880 crossing Fursden Creek towards Pioneer Mill

Technical
- Line length: 6 1/2 mi (10.5 km)
- Track gauge: 3 ft 6 in (1,067 mm)
- Operating speed: 6 miles per hour (9.7 km/h)

For his estate, John Spiller imported a new steam locomotive (4150 of 1881) from John Fowler & Co. in England. It was named on Thursday 4 August 1881 Emma Ruth after John Spiller's wife. It was capable of drawing 80 tons on a level or 16 tons up a gradient of 1 in 40 (25%) and at a speed of 15 miles per hour. The new locomotive was reported to have been a 2 1/2 inches (64 mm) cylinder, with 3 ft 6 in (1,067 mm) gauge, together with pressure gauge spring balance, whistle, and outfit complete. It pulled up to 26 cane wagons, 16 of which came out with the locomotive; they could each carry about 23 cwt (1.2 t) of cane.

The estate had a 3 ft 6 in (1,067 mm) gauge line of rails some three and a-half miles in length. The line was substantially laid on sleepers, and was similar in construction to ordinary lines. The trestle over Fursden Creek was made of 200 yd (180 m) piles, which were of up to 20 ft (6.1 m) high. In 1881, Spiller also procured from England two miles of permanent steel rails and one mile of portable rail, which were added to the existing line of 3½ miles, allowing it to run from one end of the estate to the other.

The River Estate comprised 2625 acres. In 1881 there were 1247 acres under cultivation, producing 1200 tons of sugar per season or 10 tons of first-class sugar per day.

==== Ashburton Estate and Pioneer Estate of John Spiller ====
A new mill was erected on the Ashburton Estate of John Spiller, adjoining the Pioneer Estate. The two mills were connected by a railway similar to the one on the River Estate, of which nearly 4 miles had been completed in 1881. The Pioneer Estate consisted of 4886 acres, and was estimated to produce 1100 tons of sugar per season, so that Mr Spiller would produce one-fifth of the whole sugar of the district.

=== Local government involvement ===
Keen to facilitate further development, the Pioneer Shire Council funded the construction of a 9 km extension to Finch Hatton, opened in 1904. It also funded a 12 km branch from Benholme to Kirkup, opened 1903.

Walter Paget, the MLA for Mackay, became the Minister for Railways in 1908, and the Council lines were purchased by the Queensland Railways Department to enable further extensions. The 10 km Finch Hatton - Netherdale extension (to the base of the Eungella Range) opened in 1911, as did the 2 km Kirkup - Kungurri extension.

=== Systems connected ===
In 1921 Mackay was linked to the North Coast line to Rockhampton and Brisbane, with the northern connection to Townsville opening in 1923.

A third branch, 10 km from Gargett to Owens Creek, opened in 1922. As with the other lines, the main traffic was sugar cane. Because cane is harvested for 6 months each year, the Mackay railway network had two distinct seasons, one much quieter than the other.

=== System disruption ===
In March 1956, the Mirani bridge was destroyed by flood waters, and a locomotive was moved west to operate the isolated section until a temporary bridge was opened three months later. A permanent replacement bridge was opened in December 1959.

=== Closures and conversions ===
The first section to close was the 4 km from Eton to Victoria, site of a sugar mill, in 1959. In 1967 the Kungurri and Owens Creek branches were sold to local sugar mills and converted to 610mm (2') gauge cane tramways. The section from Victoria - Newbury Junction closed in 1971.

The Netherdale-to-Finch Hatton section closed in 1977, and the 33 km Finch Hatton-to-Marian section closed in 1990, also to be converted to sugar cane tramways. The 23 km Paget Junction-to-Marian section closed December 2009.
