= Shire of Sarina =

Coordinates: 21°25′27″S 149°13′01″E

- Local government area
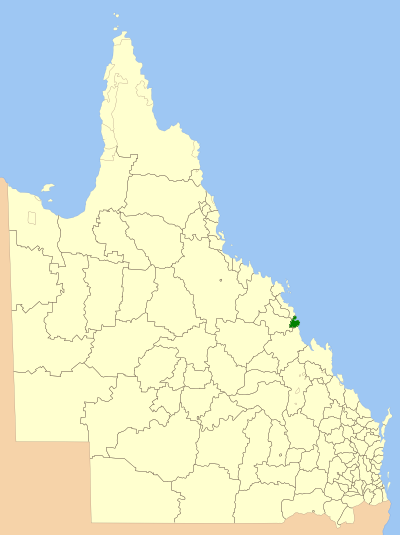
- Location within Queensland

- Country: Australia
- State: Queensland
- Region: Central Queensland
- Established: 1912
- Council seat: Sarina

Area
  - Total: 1,444.3 km^{2} (557.6 sq mi)

Population
  - Total: 10,720 (2006 census)
  - Density: 7.422/km^{2} (19.224/sq mi)
LGAs around Shire of Sarina
Mackay	Coral Sea	Coral Sea
Nebo	Shire of Sarina	Coral Sea
Nebo	Broadsound	Coral Sea

The Shire of Sarina was a local government area located in the Central Queensland region of Queensland, Australia. The shire, administered from the town of Sarina, covered an area of 1,444.3 square kilometres (557.6 sq mi), and existed as a local government entity from 1912 until 2008, when it amalgamated with the City of Mackay and the Shire of Mirani to form the Mackay Region.

The shire was situated to the south of Mackay on the Coral Sea coast. The area's industry is based on agriculture, tourism and the export of coal.

== History ==
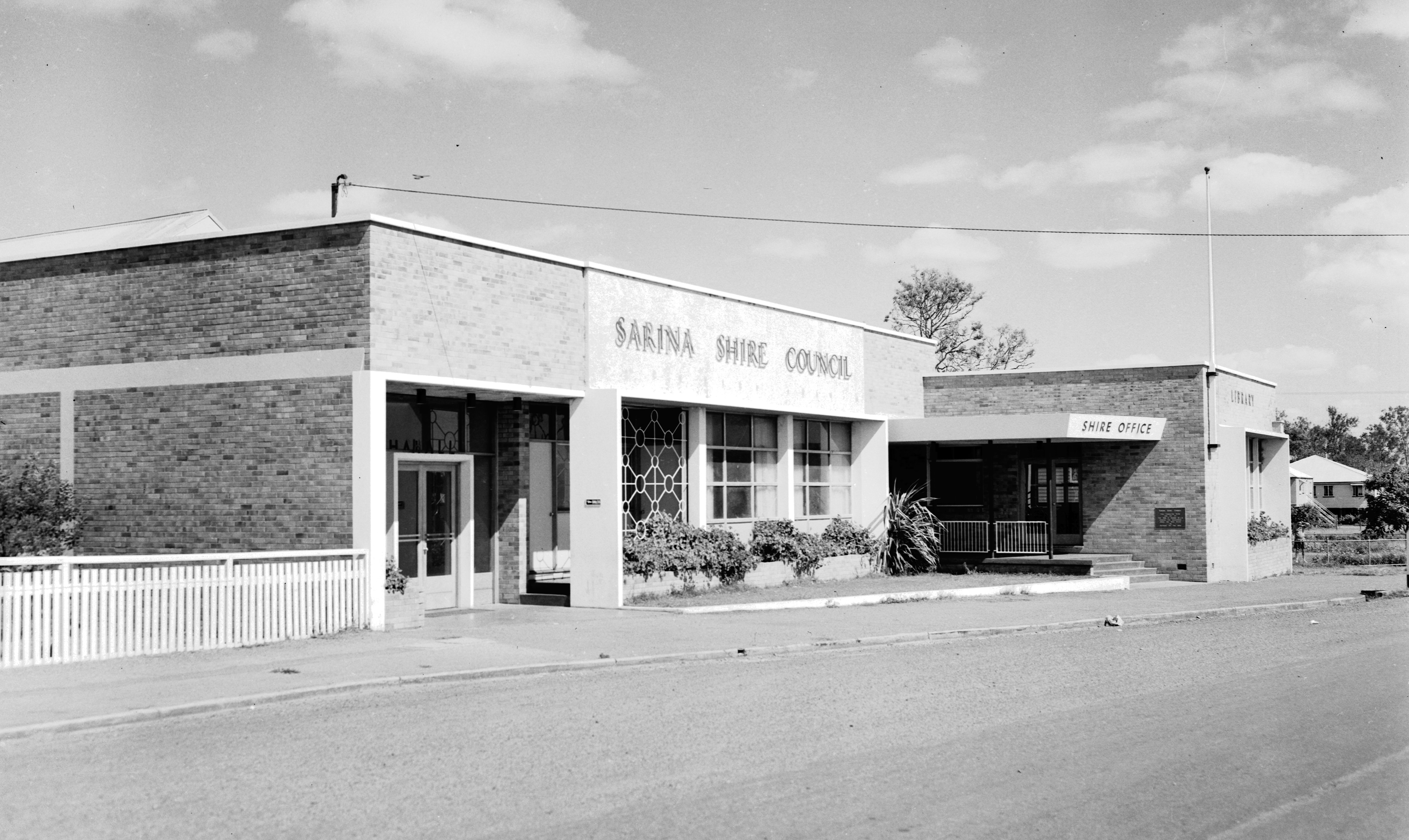
Offices of the Sarina Shire Council, circa 1962

Pioneer Division was one of the 74 divisional boards established on 11 November 1879 under the Divisional Boards Act 1879 with a population of 2884 and covered the region surrounding but not including the Borough of Mackay. With the passage of the Local Authorities Act 1902, Pioneer Division became the Shire of Pioneer on 31 March 1903.

The Shire of Sarina was established from part of the Shire of Pioneer (Mackay) on 1 January 1912 under the Local Authorities Act 1902. Its first chairman was Alex Innes.

On 15 March 2008, under the Local Government (Reform Implementation) Act 2007 passed by the Parliament of Queensland on 10 August 2007, the Shire of Sarina merged with the City of Mackay and Shire of Mirani to form the Mackay Region.

== Towns and localities ==
The Shire of Sarina included the following settlements:

Towns:

- Sarina
- Alligator Creek
- Armstrong Beach
- Campwin Beach
- Freshwater Point
- Grasstree Beach
- Half Tide Beach
- Hay Point
- Koumala
- Sarina Beach

Localities:

- Louisa Creek
- Munbura
- West Plane Creek

== Chairmen ==
- 1927: John Christopher Nicholson
- 1964—1974: Tom Newbery

== Population ==
Year	Population
1933	3,121
1947	3,268
1954	3,790
1961	3,886
1966	4,611
1971	5,422
1976	5,852
1981	6,922
1986	7,537
1991	8,081
1996	9,394
2001	9,637
2006	10,720
