= Mount Martin Cane Lift =

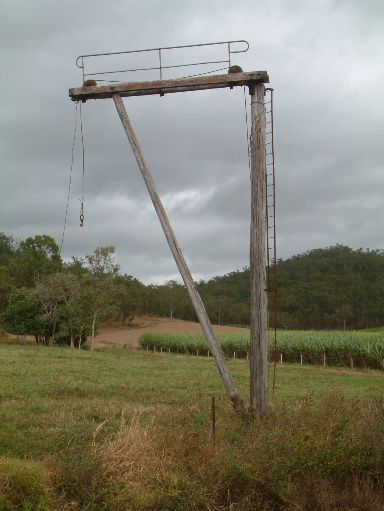
- Mount Martin Cane Lift, 2006

- Location within Queensland Location within Australia
- 21.1147°S 148.8051°E
- Location: Mirani Mount Ossa Road, Mount Martin, Mackay Region, Queensland, Australia

History
- Design period: 1919 - 1930s (interwar period)
- Built: Before 1939

Queensland Heritage Register
- Official name: Mount Martin Cane Lift
- Type: state heritage
- Designated: 5 February 2010
- Reference no.: 602750
- Significant period: Post World War I

Mount Martin Cane Lift is a heritage-listed piece of agricultural equipment at Mirani Mount Ossa Road, Mount Martin, Mackay Region, Queensland, Australia. It was built before 1939. It was added to the Queensland Heritage Register on 5 February 2010.

== History ==
The Mount Martin cane lift is situated near the locality of the same name in a rural area west of the city of Mackay. Mackay is the regional centre of one of Queensland's main sugar cane growing areas. One of the top two sugar producing regions in the state, it produces about a third of the sugar in Queensland. Sugar cane is a major crop in Queensland; the state produces nearly all of the nation's sugar. The cane lifts formed part of the process of transporting bundled whole stalks of harvested sugar cane from the farms to the sugar mill. They were rendered obsolete by the universal adoption of "chopper" harvesters from the 1960s.

Sugar cane was first introduced to Australia in 1788 with the arrival of the First Fleet. In 1821, Port Macquarie under the command of Captain Allman became Australia's first cane-growing area. In Queensland, the successful cultivation of sugar cane was established in 1864 at Redland Bay by Captain Louis Hope who erected Queensland's first sugar-crushing mill on the banks of Hilliard's Creek (now Ormiston) about 25 kilometres (16 mi) south-east of Brisbane.

Cane growing was tried at Bowen in the Whitsunday Region in 1864 but continued there only until 1869, when it became clear that the climate was too dry. In the Pioneer Valley the first grower in the Mackay region was John Spiller. He arrived in Mackay in 1865 as a would-be squatter without capital but with cane brought from Java which he planted on the north bank of the Pioneer River. In June 1867 he produced the first sugar in the region.

The incipient cane growing industry was given impetus in 1864 with the enactment of the Sugar and Coffee Regulations, introduced by the government to encourage northern settlement. This enabled lessees to obtain plots of up to 1,280 acres (520 ha) at a reasonable cost. Spiller and John Crees selected two blocks that became the Pioneer Plantation and built a primitive mill. T H Fitzgerald began a commercial plantation, Alexandra, in 1866 and with J Ewen Davidson set up a steam-powered mill that produced 110 long tons (110 t) of sugar in 1868. With these facilities a sugar boom began: small growers brought their cane for crushing to the Alexandra mill and acreage under cane expanded rapidly. Cane growers pushed back the graziers and by 1870 five mills were established.

By 1872 Mackay mills produced 40 per cent of the total Queensland sugar production and 37 per cent of its rum. Seventeen mills were established along the Pioneer River before 1875, most in 1872 and 1873. Another 12 including Farleigh, Habana, Homebush, and Marian were established between 1881 and 1885, then North Eton and Racecourse in 1888, Plane Creek began at Sarina in 1896 and in 1906 Cattle Creek Mill at Finch Hatton started operations.

Where crops were near the main railway line, cut cane was transported from field to mill via rail wagons. However, in cases where the crops and mills were remote from the railway, many mills established extensive tram networks for transporting harvested cane. The railway and tram networks continue to be used together with road transport.

From at least as early as the 1890s, cane lifts at tram or railway sidings were used to transfer bundles of cane onto rail or tram wagons. Cane was initially harvested as whole stalks by hand and, later, by whole stalk mechanical harvesters. The cane was cut close to the ground and then the top foliage was cut off. It was transported to the mill as whole stalks. A frequent practise was to lay temporary tramlines into the field so that tram wagons could be loaded with cut cane close to where the harvesting took place. Where this practise was not followed, the cane was loaded onto a horse-drawn wagon or motorised vehicle. This was done by hand until the introduction of mechanised loaders in the mid-20th century. The wagon or vehicle transported the cane to the nearest siding where the bundles of cane were transferred onto a tram or rail wagon using the cane lifts.

Many lifts were on private property, others on railway land at sidings. In many cases sugar mills paid for the construction of the lifts and cane farmers repaid the money at a predetermined cost per ton of cane sent to the mill.

The lifts took different forms. F W Bolton, the manager of Farleigh Mill, is credited with introducing the "traverser" type by 1891. This consisted of an overhead travelling winch which traversed a horizontal beam supported by two posts. The cane was laid flat on a sling in a dray which was driven under the winch. The winch was used to hoist the bundle of cane which was traversed about two metres and lowered into a tramway wagon parked next to the dray. The lift was praised at the time for greatly reducing loading times and enabling the cane to be packed more densely. Apparently this type of lift was widely adopted but there are no known examples extant in the Mackay area.

A similar configuration, possibly a modification of the traverser type, comprised two posts supporting a horizontal beam with a fixed pulley. These were predominantly used with tram wagons. As with the traverser the tram track passed under the horizontal beam. The wagon or truck containing the cane stalks was driven along the tram tracks to a position beneath the horizontal beam. The bundle of cane was hoisted, then the truck was driven out and its position taken by the tram wagon into which the cane was then lowered.

The Mount Martin lift is an example of the derrick type. This type featured a boom fixed by a pivoting coupling to the bottom of a mast. The boom was held in a diagonal attitude to the mast by hinged horizontal beam extending from the top of the mast to the end of the boom. The boom swung in an arc and the lifting hook was lowered from the end of the horizontal beam. A ladder was typically fitted to the mast to permit access to the top of the derrick for maintenance purposes. Ladders could be wooden rungs fastened directly to the side of the mast or complete ladders with steel rungs and side rails. Derrick type lifts were in use by 1893. They were used mostly to load cane into main line railway wagons.

Albert John Wellman Fudge, a carpenter, is credited by some with inventing the derrick type lift. Fudge was a British immigrant who moved to Mackay in the 1890s. It is claimed that Fudge built over one hundred cane lifts for most district mills. His work was said to have been carried on by Harry Penny until the introduction of chopper harvesters.

A variety of methods were used to power the hoist. It was common to use a horse hitched to a pole fixed to a rotating drum. This system was later adapted for use with a motor. From World War II, trucks were also used. Power was transferred via a set of rollers positioned in the ground so that they would engage with the wheels of the truck carrying the cane.

The Mount Martin lift was located close beside the railway branch line to Kungurri, opened in 1911. It was designed to transfer cut cane onto rail wagons. Several lifts originally existed at this location and a number of other derricks were erected at other sidings along the line. The extant lift dates to prior to 1939. In 1968, Marian Mill, the main user of the line, shifted to road transport because of the high cost of rail transport relative to road. This led to the closure of the branch line in 1970 and the lifting of the rails. A cane tramway presently runs along the old rail easement close to the lift.

Cane lifts became redundant after the widespread introduction of chopper mechanical harvesters. Mechanical harvesting was attempted with little real success from the late 19th century. The development of mechanical harvesters accelerated from World War II. The first harvesters cut the cane as whole stalks. This meant that the labour-intensive task of bundling whole cane stalks and loading them continued. From the early 1950s, mechanical loaders alleviated this problem to some extent.

The introduction of chopper harvesters solved the loading problem. These harvesters chop the cane stalks into short lengths or billets. The billets are ejected from the harvester directly into bins towed by motor vehicle alongside the harvester. The bins are towed to the rail siding where they are transferred onto tram or rail wagons. Alternatively, the billets are tipped into bins on the wagons. By the mid-1960s, chopper harvesters had almost completely superseded whole stalk harvesters. The extant cane lifts probably all predate this time and some could date to the late 19th century.

== Description ==
The Mount Martin cane lift is situated at the locality of the same name on the southern side of the Mirani-Mt Ossa Road. Mount Martin is located 45 kilometres (28 mi) west of Mackay. The lift is near a tram track in an area where there are extensive fields of sugar cane.

The lift stands between 7 and 8 metres (23 and 26 ft) high. Its main components are a single upright wooden mast, a wooden boom and a horizontal beam assembly. The horizontal beam assembly consists of two coupled timber beams. The boom is fixed via a hinged coupling to the bottom of the mast. The horizontal beam is fixed via a hinge to the top of the mast and the end of the boom, holding the boom in a diagonal attitude to the mast.

Pulley wheels are fixed to the horizontal beam assembly so that the wheels turn between the coupled wooden beams. A wheel is fitted to each end of the beam. Steel cable runs through the pulley wheels. A hook is suspended at the end of the cable. A steel ladder is fitted to the side of the mast and a safety rail runs almost the full length of the horizontal beam.

The lift is located in an open grassy paddock adjacent to a cane field.

== Heritage listing ==
Mount Martin Cane Lift was listed on the Queensland Heritage Register on 5 February 2010 having satisfied the following criteria.

The place is important in demonstrating the evolution or pattern of Queensland's history.

The Mount Martin cane lift is one of a group of lifts in the Mackay region, one of Queensland's oldest and most productive sugar cane growing areas. Historically, sugar has been one of the State's most important agricultural commodities. The lifts are important in demonstrating the evolution of the industry in that they provide evidence of how harvested cane was transported before the introduction of mechanical chopper harvesters. Sugar cane was originally harvested and transported to mills as whole stalks. The lifts were used to hoist bundles of stalks into tram or train wagons. They became redundant after the universal adoption of chopper harvesters from the 1960s. The Mount Martin lift dates to before 1939.

The place is important in demonstrating the principal characteristics of a particular class of cultural places.

The Mount Martin cane lift is important in demonstrating the principal characteristics of its type. The lifts took two basic forms: a derrick with a swinging boom, and a horizontal beam supported by two upright posts. The lift at Mount Martin is a highly intact example of the derrick type and includes pulley wheels, cable, hook and access ladder. The ladder is a typical feature of this type of lift and was fitted to permit access to the top of the derrick for maintenance purposes.
