= Pioneer State High School =

Public school in Queensland, Australia

Location
- Mackay, Queensland; Australia; 21.0958°S 149.1806°E

Information
- Type: Public
- Motto: Pride. Honesty. Success.
- Established: 1986
- Principal: Lisa Veney
- Grades: Year 7 to Year 12
- Enrolment: 567 (2024)
- Website: https://pioneershs.eq.edu.au/

Pioneer State High School is a public, co-educational secondary school located in the Mackay suburb of Andergrove, Queensland, Australia. It is administered by the Queensland Department of Education, with an enrolment of 567 students and a teaching staff of 51 as of 2024. The school serves students from Year 7 to Year 12 and was established in 1986.

== History ==
The school opened on 28 January 1986, to serve the increase of the population in the area at the time. It opened with 400 students in Years 8, 9 and 11. In 1987, the school offered places for all year levels from Year 8 to Year 12.

== Demographics ==
The Australian Curriculum, Assessment and Reporting Authority (ACARA), through its Data Access Program, publishes annual school profiles that include demographic data. These reports have been available since 2008 and provide information on enrolment figures, staffing, and student backgrounds.

According to ACARA data:

- In 2022, the school had a student enrolment of 601 with 52 teachers (49.1 full-time equivalent) and 38 non-teaching staff (27.7 full-time equivalent). Female enrolments consisted of 270 students and Male enrolments consisted of 331 students; Indigenous enrolments accounted for a total of 25% and 9% of students had a language background other than English.
- In 2023, the school had a student enrolment of 612 with 52 teachers (49.2 full-time equivalent) and 43 non-teaching staff (31.9 full-time equivalent). Female enrolments consisted of 281 students and Male enrolments consisted of 331 students; Indigenous enrolments accounted for a total of 29% and 10% of students had a language background other than English.
- In 2024, the school had a student enrolment of 567 with 51 teachers (48.7 full-time equivalent) and 40 non-teaching staff (31.7 full-time equivalent). Female enrolments consisted of 272 students and Male enrolments consisted of 295 students; Indigenous enrolments accounted for a total of 32% and 12% of students had a language background other than English.

== Notable alumni ==
Alumni lists are available on the Names Database and the school has a section of past students on its website. Notable alumni include the Olympic gold medallist Cathy Freeman. Carrol Baggow, a student at the school was chosen to be one of fifty members of the National Youth Roundtable for 2004 out of 663 applicants.

== See also ==
- Education in Queensland
- List of schools in North Queensland
