= Mount Charlton, Queensland =

Mount Charlton
- Suburb
- Interactive map of Mount Charlton
- Coordinates: 21.0166°S 148.7469°E
- Country: Australia
- State: Queensland
- LGA: Mackay Region
- Location: 14.9 km (9.3 mi) SW of Calen; 38.6 km (24.0 mi) NW of Mirani; 70.5 km (43.8 mi) NW of Mackay; 1,043 km (648 mi) NNW of Brisbane

Government
  - State electorate: Whitsunday
  - Federal division: Dawson

Area
  - Total: 121.3 km^{2} (46.8 sq mi)

Population
  - Total: 151 (2021 census)
  - Density: 1.245/km^{2} (3.224/sq mi)
- Time zone: UTC+10:00 (AEST)
- Postcode: 4741
Suburbs around Mount Charlton
Eungella Hinterland	Calen	Mount Pelion
Eungella Hinterland	Mount Charlton	Mount Ossa
Eungella Hinterland	Dows Creek	Mount Martin

Mount Charlton is a rural locality in the Mackay Region, Queensland, Australia. In the 2021 census, Mount Charlton had a population of 151 people.

== Geography ==
The Mirani - Mount Ossa Road enters the locality from the south (Dows Creek) and exits to the east (Mount Ossa).

There are two neighbourhoods in the locality:

- Camerons Pocket in the north of the locality (20.95°S 148.7333°E)
- Kungurri in the far south of the locality (21.0727°S 148.7297°E)

The locality has the following mountains (from north to south):

- Crazy Cat Mountain (20.9759°S 148.7134°E) 377 metres (1,237 ft)
- Mount Charlton (21.0003°S 148.7241°E) 380 metres (1,250 ft)
- The Pinnacle (21.0373°S 148.7521°E)
- Bluff Hill (21.0459°S 148.7667°E) at 380 metres (1,250 ft) above sea level

and the following passes (from north to south):

- Camerons Gap (20.9666°S 148.7333°E)
- St Helens Gap (20.9988°S 148.7054°E)
- Kungurri Gap (21.0729°S 148.7297°E)

There are a number of protected areas within the locality:

- Cathu State Forest in the northern tip of the locality
- a section of the Eungella National Park in the north of the locality
- St Helens Gap Conservation Park in the west of the locality
- part of the Bluff Hill National Park in the south-east of the locality (extending into neighbouring Dows Creek to the south)
- Bluff Hill State Forest in the south of the locality.

Apart from the protected areas, the land use is a mixture of grazing on native vegetation and crop growing (predominantly sugarcane).

== History ==
Mount Charlton State School opened on 4 March 1931. It was mothballed on 31 December 2009 and closed on 31 December 2010. It was at 2342 Mirani-Mount Ossa Road (21.0222°S 148.7296°E). The school's website was archived. As at September 2022, the school building is still extant.

About 8 kilometres (5 mi) south-west of Mount Ossa in is the site of the former settlement of Silent Grove. The Silent Grove Provisional School opened on 29 August 1928. On 3 February 1936 the Silent Grove Upper State School opened. In 1938, the Silent Grove Provisional School closed, being replaced by the Mount Ossa State School in neighbouring Mount Ossa. The Silent Grove Upper State School closed about 1964. Silent Grove Upper State School was at 2948 Mirani-Mount Ossa Road (20.9891°S 148.7684°E).

== Demographics ==
In the 2016 census, Mount Charlton had a population of 150 people.

In the 2021 census, Mount Charlton had a population of 151 people.

== Education ==
There are no schools in Mount Charlton. The nearest government primary schools are:

- Calen District State College in Calen to the north
- Hampden State School in Hampden to the east
- Mirani State School in Mirani to the south-east
- Gargett State School in Gargett to the south

The nearest government secondary schools are:

- Calen District State College in Calen to the north
- Mirani State High School in Mirani to the south-east
