= Teemburra Dam =

Dam in Mackay, Queensland, Australia

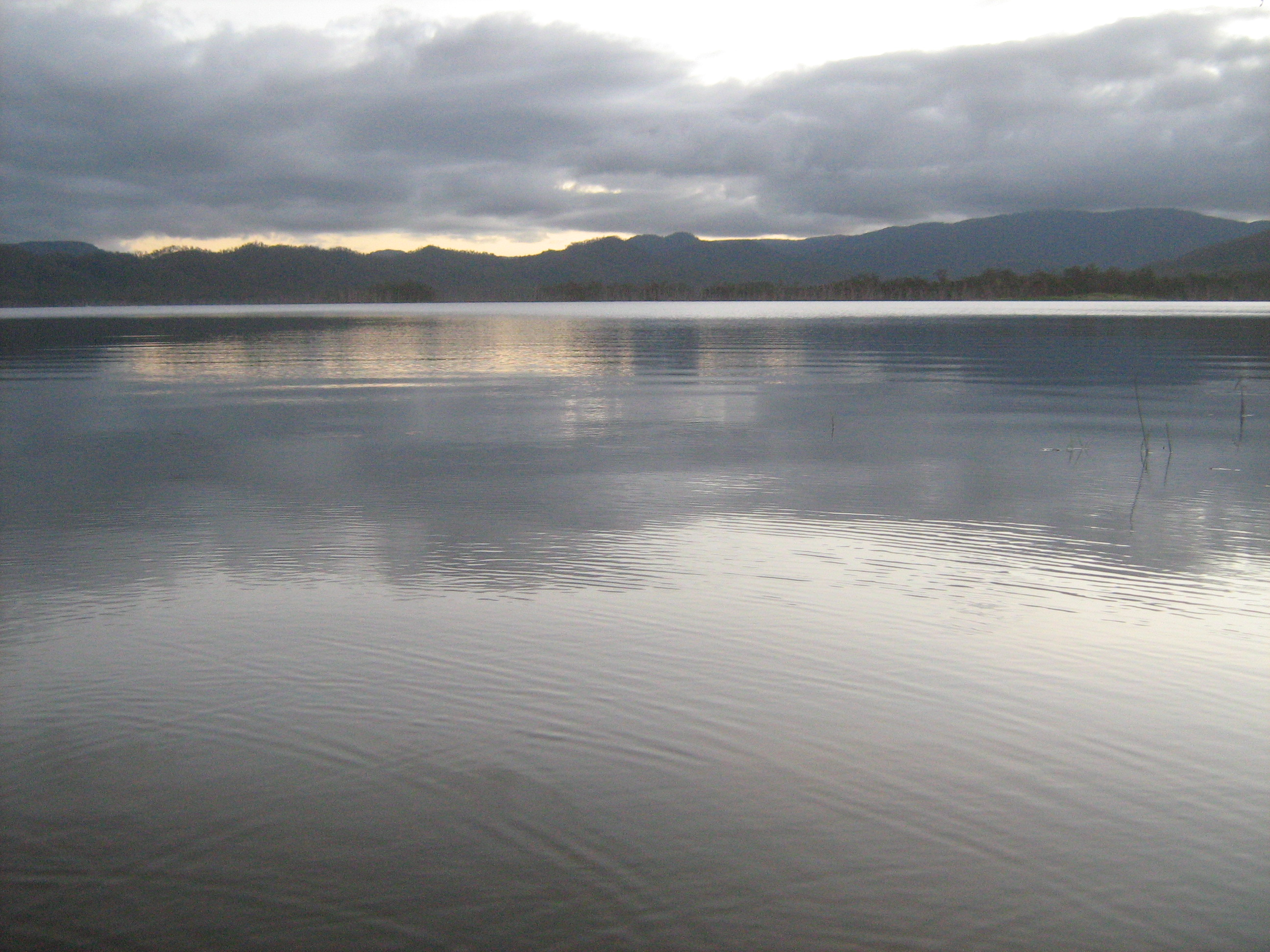
- The dam reservoir in 1980

- Location of the dam in Queensland
- Interactive map of Teemburra Dam
- Country: Australia
- Location: west of Mackay, Queensland
- Coordinates: 21°13′08″S 148°39′51″E
- Purpose: Water supply; Irrigation
- Status: Operational
- Opening date: 1997
- Built by: Thiess Contractors
- Operator: Sunwater

Dam and spillways
- Type of dam: Rock-fill dam
- Impounds: Teemburra Creek
- Height (foundation): 56 m (184 ft)
- Length: 350 m (1,150 ft)
- Elevation at crest: 295 m (968 ft) AHD
- Width (crest): 6 m (20 ft)
- Dam volume: 552×10^{3} m^{3} (19.5×10^{6} cu ft)
- Spillway type: Uncontrolled
- Spillway length: 60 m (200 ft)
- Spillway capacity: 950 m^{3}/s (34,000 cu ft/s)

Reservoir
- Total capacity: 147,500 ML (119,600 acre⋅ft)
- Catchment area: 87 km^{2} (34 sq mi)
- Surface area: 1,107 ha (2,740 acres)
- Maximum water depth: 54 m (177 ft)
- Normal elevation: 290 m (950 ft) AHD
- Website sunwater.com.au

The Teemburra Dam is a rock-fill embankment dam, with two saddle dams, across the Teemburra Creek, located near the settlement of Gargett, approximately 50 kilometres (31 mi) west of Mackay, Queensland, Australia. The dam was completed in 1997 to supply potable water and for irrigation purposes.

== Overview ==
The rock-filled structure is 56 metres (184 ft) high and 350 metres (1,150 ft) long. The complex is part of the Pioneer River Scheme and includes two earth-filled saddle dams. The main dam regulates flows into Teemburra Creek, while the Saddle Dam No. 2 supplies water into the Palm Tree Creek pipeline. The pipeline runs 1.8 kilometres (1.1 mi) and is approximately 180 metres (590 ft) lower in elevation than the reservoir full supply level. Collectively, the dam walls create a reservoir that has a capacity of 147,500 megalitres (119,600 acre⋅ft) when full, covers a surface area of 1,040 hectares (2,600 acres) and is drawn from a catchment area of 87 square kilometres (34 sq mi). The uncontrolled spillway can handle 950 cubic metres per second (34,000 cu ft/s) and delivers water to the adjacent Cattle Creek Valley for irrigation purposes.

== Recreation ==
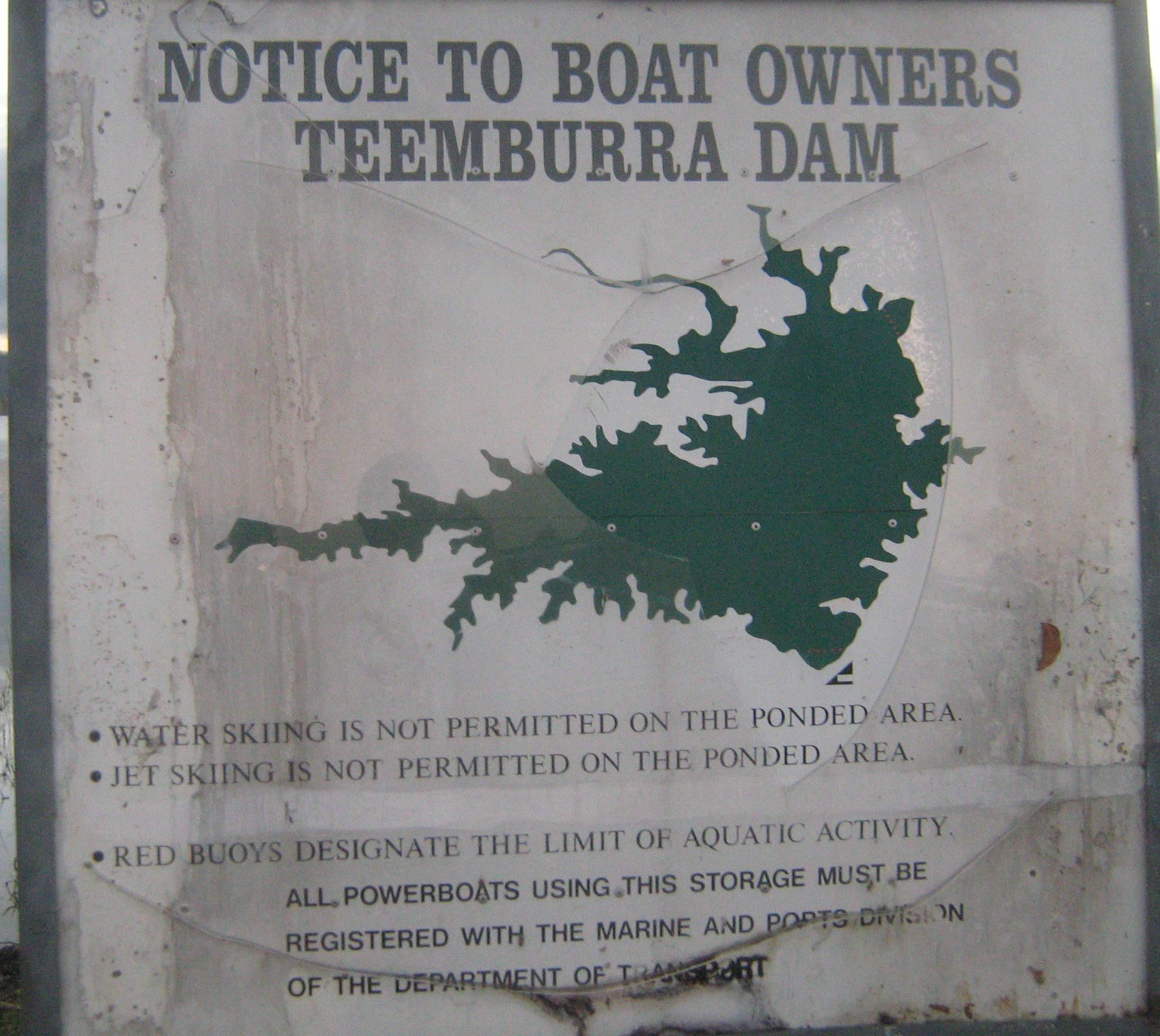
A sign near the dam

A Stocked Impoundment Permit is required to fish in the dam.

== See also ==
- List of dams and reservoirs in Australia
