= Whitsunday Anglican School =

Location
- 2/16 Celeber Drive, Mackay, Queensland; Australia; 21°6′11″S 149°10′25″E

Information
- Type: Independent early learning, primary and secondary day and boarding school
- Motto: Latin: Spiritus Scientiae (The Spirit of Knowledge)
- Denomination: Anglican
- Established: 1988; 38 years ago
- Founder: The Right Reverend John Lewis SSM
- Chairman: Mr D Watts, BaG.Ec, CA
- Headmaster: Andrew Wheaton
- Key people: Mr. A Wheaton
- Years: Early learning to Year 12
- Gender: co-ed
- Enrolment: c. 847
- Colours: Red, white & grey
- Tuition: Varies by grade
- Affiliation: Australian Boarding Schools Association; Association of Heads of Independent Schools of Australia; Independent Primary School Heads of Australia; Independent Schools Queensland
- Former pupils: Old Scholars
- Website: www.was.qld.edu.au

The Whitsunday Anglican School (WAS) is an independent Anglican co-educational early learning, primary and secondary day and boarding school, located in Beaconsfield, a suburb in Mackay, Queensland, Australia.

Established in 1988 by the seventh Anglican bishop of North Queensland, The Right Reverend John Lewis SSM, Whitsunday Anglican is the leading academic institution in the Mackay region. The school has a non-selective enrolment policy and currently caters for approximately 900 students from early learning to Year 12, including 80 boarders from Years 5 to 12. It has the highest percentage of students in the top quarter of socio-educational advantage in the region.

The school is affiliated with the Australian Boarding Schools Association (ABSA), the Association of Heads of Independent Schools of Australia (AHISA), the Independent Primary School Heads of Australia (IPSHA), Independent Schools Queensland (ISQ), and the Commonwealth Register of Institutes and Courses for Overseas Students.

The school cohort is divided up into four houses for competitions like house choir and sports events. The houses include, Ambrose, Barnabas, Charles and Trinity, all named after Christian saints.

== History ==
The school was established in 1988 by The Right Reverend John Lewis SSM. The first boarding house (Booth Boarding House) was established in 1988.

== International students ==
Whitsunday Anglican School is the only on-campus boarding school in the Mackay region. This allows WAS to cater to international students on campus. It is also a CRICOS verified school.

== See also ==
- List of boarding schools in Australia
- List of schools in Queensland
- List of Anglican schools in Australia
- List of schools in North Queensland
- List of boarding schools in Australia
