= St Joseph's Catholic School, Mundingburra =

Primary school in Queensland, Australia

Location
- 65-75 Ross River Road; Townsville, Queensland; Australia
- Coordinates: 19°17′37″S 146°47′24″E

Information
- Type: Systemic primary school
- Motto: Love is Service
- Religious affiliation: Catholic Diocese of Townsville
- Denomination: Roman Catholicism
- Patron saint: Mary MacKillop
- Established: 1924; 102 years ago
- Principal: Tracy Nuttall
- Enrolment: 360 (2023)
- Website: Official site

St Joseph's Catholic School is an independent Roman Catholic co-educational primary school, located in the Townsville suburb of Mundingburra, Queensland, Australia. It is administered by the Queensland Catholic Education Commission, with an enrolment of 360 students and a teaching staff of 29, as of 2023. The school serves students from Prep to Year 6, and is part of the Roman Catholic Diocese of Townsville.

== History ==
The school was established 1 January 1924, and in 1936, it opened next door to the state school.

Justen Shawn Orford, a previous principal of the school, was fired in 2021, after being arrested for numerous child exploitation charges, which he pleaded guilty to in September 2023.

== Demographics ==
In 2023, the school had a student enrollment of 360 with 29 teachers (22.6 full-time equivalent) and 21 non-teaching staff (15.1 full-time equivalent). Female enrollments consisted of 188 students and Male enrollments consisted of 172 students; Indigenous enrollments accounted for a total of 6% and 7% of students had a language background other than English.

== See also ==
- Education in Australia
- List of schools in North Queensland
