= Armstrong Beach, Queensland =

Armstrong Beach
- Town
- Interactive map of Armstrong Beach
- Coordinates: 21.4525°S 149.2905°E
- Country: Australia
- State: Queensland
- LGA: Mackay Region
- Location: 9.8 km (6.1 mi) ESE of Sarina; 46.4 km (28.8 mi) S of Mackay; 919 km (571 mi) NNW of Brisbane

Government
  - State electorate: Mirani
  - Federal division: Capricornia

Area
  - Total: 21.4 km^{2} (8.3 sq mi)

Population
  - Total: 903 (2021 census)
  - Density: 42.20/km^{2} (109.29/sq mi)
- Time zone: UTC+10:00 (AEST)
- Postcode: 4737
Localities around Armstrong Beach
Sarina	Freshwater Point	Freshwater Point
Sarina	Armstrong Beach	Coral Sea
Sarina	Sarina	Sarina

Armstrong Beach is a coastal town and a locality in the Mackay Region, Queensland, Australia. In the 2021 census, the locality of Armstrong Beach had a population of 903 people.

== Geography ==
The waters of the Coral Sea form the eastern boundary.

== History ==
The locality was mistakenly named and bounded on 4 June 1999 as Armstrong Creek but was corrected on 19 November 1999 to be Armstrong Beach.

== Demographics ==
In the 2016 census, the locality of Armstrong Beach had a population of 863 people.

In the 2021 census, the locality of Armstrong Beach had a population of 903 people.

== Education ==
There are no schools in Armstrong Beach. The nearest government primary and secondary schools are Sarina State School and Sarina State High School, both in neighbouring Sarina to the west.
