= Mount Martin, Queensland =

Mount Martin
- Town
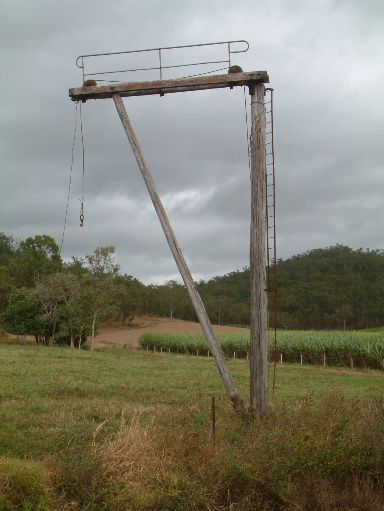
- Cane Lift at Mount Martin, 2006

- Interactive map of Mount Martin
- Coordinates: 21.105°S 148.8208°E
- Country: Australia
- State: Queensland
- LGA: Mackay Region
- Location: 8.9 km (5.5 mi) NNW of Mirani; 42.9 km (26.7 mi) W of Mackay; 987 km (613 mi) NNW of Brisbane

Government
  - State electorate: Mirani
  - Federal division: Capricornia

Area
  - Total: 40.3 km^{2} (15.6 sq mi)

Population
  - Total: 191 (2021 census)
  - Density: 4.739/km^{2} (12.28/sq mi)
- Time zone: UTC+10:00 (AEST)
- Postcode: 4754
Localities around Mount Martin
| Mount Charlton | Mount Ossa | Kuttabul |
| Dows Creek | Mount Martin | Devereux Creek |
| Dows Creek | Benholme | Mirani |

Mount Martin is a rural locality in the Mackay Region, Queensland, Australia. In the 2021 census, the locality of Mount Martin had a population of 191 people.

== Geography ==
The predominant land use is growing sugarcane with some grazing on native vegetation. There is a network of cane tramways to deliver the harvested sugarcane to the sugar mills for processing.

== History ==
Mount Martin Provisional School opened in May 1906. On 1 January 1909 it became Mount Martin State School. It closed on 31 December 1961.

== Demographics ==
In the 2011 census, the locality of Mount Martin had a population of 306 people.

In the 2016 census, the locality of Mount Martin had a population of 186 people.

In the 2021 census, the locality of Mount Martin had a population of 191 people.

== Heritage listings ==
Mount Martin has a number of heritage-listed sites, including:

- Mount Martin Cane Lift, Mirani-Mount Ossa Road

== Education ==
There are no schools in Mount Martin. The nearest government primary schools are Mirani State School in neighbouring Mirani to the south-east and Gargett State School in Gargett to the south-west. The nearest government secondary school is Mirani State High School in Mirani.
