= Septimus, Queensland =

Septimus
- Suburb
- Interactive map of Septimus
- Coordinates: 21.2769°S 148.7627°E
- Country: Australia
- State: Queensland
- LGA: Mackay Region
- Location: 22.3 km (13.9 mi) SW of Mirani; 59.4 km (36.9 mi) W of Mackay; 398 km (247 mi) NNW of Rockhampton; 983 km (611 mi) NNW of Brisbane

Government
  - State electorate: Mirani
  - Federal division: Capricornia

Area
  - Total: 201.6 km^{2} (77.8 sq mi)

Population
  - Total: 120 (2021 census)
  - Density: 0.595/km^{2} (1.54/sq mi)
- Time zone: UTC+10:00 (AEST)
- Postcode: 4754
Suburbs around Septimus
Pinnacle	Gargett; Benholme	Mirani; Mia Mia
Pinnacle	Septimus	Pinevale
Crediton	Mount Britton	Pinevale

Septimus is a rural locality in the Mackay Region, Queensland, Australia. In the 2021 census, Septimus had a population of 120 people.

== Geography ==
The south of the locality is a large mountainous pastoral lease covered in natural bushland; its principal land use is grazing on native vegetation. The central area of the locality is part of the Mia Mia State Forest and is used for production forestry.

The northern part of the locality is low-lying land along the Pioneer River and its tributary Cattle Creek and is used for irrigated farming, predominantly growing sugarcane. A network of cane tramways carries the harvested sugarcane to the local sugar mills, the closest being Marian Mill in Marian to the north-east.

Septimus has the following mountains:

- Mount Jimmy Jacky (21.2723°S 148.7536°E) 260 metres (850 ft)
- Mount Mia Mia (21.2239°S 148.7932°E) 320 metres (1,050 ft)

== History ==
The locality is believed to have taken its name from a praenomen.

Septimus Provisional School opened on 20 January 1904. On 1 January 1909 it became Septimus State School. The school was mothballed on 31 December 1999 and permanently closed on 24 August 2005. It was at 888-892 Gargett Mia Mia Road (21.2043°S 148.7642°E) and was converted into holiday accommodation.

== Demographics ==
In the 2016 census, Septimus had a population of 127 people.

In the 2021 census, Septimus had a population of 120 people.

== Education ==
There are no schools in Septimus. The nearest government primary schools are Gargett State School in neighbouring Gargett to the north and Pinnacle State School in neighbouring Pinnacle to the north-west. The nearest government secondary school is Mirani State High School in neighbouring Mirani to the north-east.
