= Mackay Christian College =

Location
- 17 Ambrose Way, 9 Quarry Street; North Mackay, Queensland; Australia; 21.115°S 149.182°E

Information
- Type: Private, Christian
- Motto: Thy Will be Done
- Established: 1984
- Principal: Dr Lesley Tunnah
- Grades: P–12
- Enrolment: 764
- Colours: Dark blue and dark red

Mackay Christian College is a coeducational independent Christian school based in North Mackay in the Mackay Region in Queensland, Australia. The college is situated across two campuses, with the Providence Campus situated on Ambrose Way and the Kings Park Campus situated on Quarry Street. The Providence Campus accommodates students from Pre-Prep to Year 6 whereas the Kings Park Campus accommodates students from Years 7 to 12.

== Vocational Education & Training ==
- Certificate I in Construction (CPC10111)
- Certificate II in Engineering Pathways (MEM20413)
- Certificate II in Rural Operations (AHC21216)

== Extracurricular activities ==
- Academic competitions for students Years 6 to 12 with a proficiency in Mathematics, English and Science
- Adventure Club
- Aero Club
- Cattle Show Team
- Chess clubs; Junior School Chess Club and Middle & Senior School Chess Club
- Choirs; Year 3 Choir, Year 4/5 Choir, Year 6/7 Choir and Song and Dance Club
- Club sports; Basketball, Girls' Soccer, Netball, Rugby League, Rugby Union, Tennis and Touch Football
- Creative Academy instrumental program
- Creative Art Class & Gallery
- Drama Club (Years 11 and 12 students only)
- F1 in Schools Technology Challenge
- Festival of Fashion
- Missions; Local Outreach, Indigenous Outreach and International Missions
- MTB School of Excellence
- Multimedia Camp
- Robotics Club
- ZACH MACH (Mackay Adventure Challenge)
