= Mount Ossa, Queensland =

Mount Ossa
- Town
- Interactive map of Mount Ossa
- Coordinates: 20.9591°S 148.8338°E
- Country: Australia
- State: Queensland
- LGA: Mackay Region
- Location: 30.8 km (19.1 mi) N of Mirani; 47.4 km (29.5 mi) NW of Mackay; 997 km (620 mi) NNW of Brisbane

Government
  - State electorate: Whitsunday
  - Federal division: Dawson

Area
  - Total: 111.4 km^{2} (43.0 sq mi)

Population
  - Total: 250 (2021 census)
  - Density: 2.24/km^{2} (5.81/sq mi)
- Time zone: UTC+10:00 (AEST)
- Postcode: 4741
Localities around Mount Ossa
Calen	Coral Sea	Seaforth
Mount Pelion	Mount Ossa	Kuttabul
Mount Charlton	Mount Martin	Kuttabul

Mount Ossa is a rural town and a coastal locality in the Mackay Region, Queensland, Australia. In the 2021 census, the locality of Mount Ossa had a population of 250 people.

== Geography ==
The locality is bounded in the north by the Coral Sea and in north-west by Murray Creek and in the north-east by Conow Creek, both of which flow into the Coral Sea. The central and north-eastern parts of the locality are mostly low-lying land (10–20 metres above sea level) and well-watered by a number of minor creeks. This land is freehold and predominantly used for growing sugarcane on the flatter level with some cattle grazing. The south-western part of the locality is mountainous including Mount Ossa (270 metres) from which the town takes its name. The south-western part is mostly bushland and includes the Mount Ossa National Park.

The town is situated in the centre of the locality. The Bruce Highway traverses the locality from south-east to west passing through the town. At the town, the highway has a junction with the Mount Ossa Seaforth Road which exits the locality in the north-east. About one kilometre north-west of the town, the highway has another junction with the Mirani Mount Ossa Road which exits the locality in the south-west. The North Coast railway line also traverses the locality from south-east to west roughly parallel and north-east relative to the highway. The town is served by the Mount Ossa railway station (20.9577°S 148.8349°E). There are two other abandoned railway stations in the locality:

- Buthurra, near the south-eastern boundary of the locality (20.9865°S 148.8623°E)
- Clanside, near the western boundary of the locality (20.9377°S 148.8235°E)

== History ==
The town was named after the Mount Ossa railway station, which in turn was named after the mountain. The mountain's name was assigned by surveyor William Charles Borlase Wilson, using a name from Greek mythology (Mounts Ossa and Pelion).

About 8 kilometres (5 mi) south-west of Mount Ossa is the site of the former settlement of Silent Grove. The Silent Grove Provisional School opened on 29 August 1928. On 3 February 1936 the Silent Grove Upper State School opened. In 1938, the Silent Grove Provisional School closed, being replaced by the Mount Ossa State School. The Silent Grove Upper State School closed about 1964 and the Mount Ossa State School closed in 1970. Silent Grove Upper State School was at 2948 Mirani-Mount Ossa Road (now in Mount Charlton). Mount Ossa State School was on Mount Ossa School Road (20.9582°S 148.8344°E).

== Demographics ==
In the 2016 census, the locality of Mount Ossa had a population of 224 people.

In the 2021 census, the locality of Mount Ossa had a population of 250 people.

== Education ==
There are no schools in Mount Ossa. The nearest government primary schools are Calen District State College in neighbouring Calen to the north-west, Seaforth State School in neighbouring Seaforth to the north-east, and Hampden State School in Hampden to the south-east. The nearest government secondary schools are Calen District State College in neighbouring Calen to the north-west, Mackay North State High School in North Mackay in Mackay to the south-west, and Mirani State High School in Mirani to the south.
