= Freshwater Point, Queensland =

Freshwater Point
- Suburb
- Interactive map of Freshwater Point
- Coordinates: 21.4061°S 149.265°E
- Country: Australia
- State: Queensland
- LGA: Mackay Region
- Location: 15.2 km (9.4 mi) E of Sarina; 51.8 km (32.2 mi) SSE of Mackay; 310 km (190 mi) NNW of Rockhampton; 955 km (593 mi) NNW of Brisbane

Government
  - State electorate: Mirani
  - Federal division: Capricornia

Area
  - Total: 19.7 km^{2} (7.6 sq mi)

Population
  - Total: 174 (2021 census)
  - Density: 8.83/km^{2} (22.88/sq mi)
- Time zone: UTC+10:00 (AEST)
- Postcode: 4737
Suburbs around Freshwater Point
Sarina Beach	Sarina Beach	Coral Sea
Sarina	Freshwater Point	Coral Sea
Armstrong Beach	Armstrong Beach	Coral Sea

Freshwater Point is a coastal locality in the Mackay Region, Queensland, Australia. In the 2021 census, Freshwater Point had a population of 174 people.

== Geography ==
The locality is bounded to the west by the Goonyella railway line, to the north-west (loosely) by Plane Creek, to the north and north-east by the Sarina Inlet (into which Plane Creek flows), to the east by the Coral Sea, to the south-east by Deception Inlet and Llewellyn Bay, and to the south-west by Freshwater Point Road.

The locality has the following coastal features (clockwise):

- Pumpkin Point (21.4022°S 149.2852°E)
- Sarina Inlet (21.4031°S 149.2972°E)
- Freshwater Point (21.4331°S 149.3346°E)
- Deception Inlet (21.4228°S 149.3193°E)
- Llewellyn Bay (21.4425°S 149.3086°E)

The land in the north of the locality adjoining Plane Creek and the Sarina is mostly low-lying marshland close to sea level and is undeveloped. The land use in the south-west of the locality is agriculture, mostly growing sugarcane with some grazing on native vegetation. The residential land is on the higher ground of the headland Freshwater Point which rises to 40 to 50 metres (130 to 160 ft) above sea level; it is a mix of suburban-sized land parcels and larger rural residential land parcels. The residential area is accessed via Armstrong Beach, the locality to the south.

== History ==
The locality takes its name from the headland Freshwater Point.

Before 1908, an earlier settler had a hut at Pumpkin Point and grew the first pumpkins in the district, giving the point its name.

The locality was officially named and bounded on 4 June 1999.

== Demographics ==
In the 2016 census, Freshwater Point had a population of 135 people.

In the 2021 census, Freshwater Point had a population of 174 people.

== Education ==
There are no schools in Freshwater Point. The nearest government primary and secondary schools are Sarina State School and Sarina State High School in neighbouring Sarina to the west.

== Amenities ==
Pumpkin Point has a sandy beach and is often used as a family picnic ground.
