= Mount Pelion, Queensland =

Mount Pelion
- Suburb
- Interactive map of Mount Pelion
- Coordinates: 20.9394°S 148.7777°E
- Country: Australia
- State: Queensland
- LGA: Mackay Region
- Location: 6.2 km (3.9 mi) SE of Calen; 50.4 km (31.3 mi) NW of Mackay CBD; 342 km (213 mi) SE of Townsville; 1,012 km (629 mi) NNW of Brisbane

Government
  - State electorate: Whitsunday
  - Federal division: Dawson

Area
  - Total: 61.1 km^{2} (23.6 sq mi)

Population
  - Total: 90 (2021 census)
  - Density: 1.47/km^{2} (3.82/sq mi)
- Time zone: UTC+10:00 (AEST)
- Postcode: 4741
Suburbs around Mount Pelion
Calen	Calen	Mount Ossa
Mount Charlton	Mount Pelion	Mount Ossa
Mount Charlton	Mount Ossa	Mount Ossa

Mount Pelion is a rural locality in the Mackay Region, Queensland, Australia. In the 2021 census, Mount Pelion had a population of 90 people.

== Geography ==
The mountain Mount Pelion (20.9556°S 148.7995°E) rises to 381 metres (1,250 ft) above sea level in the south-east of the locality.

The Bruce Highway enters the locality from the east (Mount Ossa) and exits the locality to the north-west (Calen). The North Coast railway line also enters from the east (Mount Ossa) and exits to the north-west Calen) but is north of highway.

Mount Pelion railway station is an abandoned railway station on the North Coast railway line in the east of the locality (20.9322°S 148.8127°E).

The land in the south of the locality is mostly unused, while the land in the north of the locality is predominantly used for growing sugarcane. There are some cane tramways to transport the harvested sugarcane to the local sugar mill. There is also some grazing on native vegetation.

== History ==
The mountain was named by surveyor William Charles Borlase Wilson after the Greek mythological Mount Pelion. The locality and railway station take their name from the mountain.

Mount Pelion Provisional School opened on 26 February 1924. On 1 August 1926 it became Mount Pelion State School. It closed on 31 December 1970. The school was located about 19 Bogga Road (20.9298°S 148.8143°E). On 11 August 1987 the school building was relocated to Northview State School in Mount Pleasant but it gradually fell into disrepair. On 24 October 2014 the building was moved to Sarina to be restored as part of the Sarina Tourist Art and Craft Visitor Information Centre in Railway Square.

== Demographics ==
In the 2016 census, Mount Pelion had a population of 125 people.

In the 2021 census, Mount Pelion had a population of 90 people.

== Education ==
There are no schools in Mount Pelion. The nearest government primary and secondary school is Calen District State College (Prep-12) in Calen to the north-west.
