= Owens Creek, Queensland =

Owens Creek
- Suburb
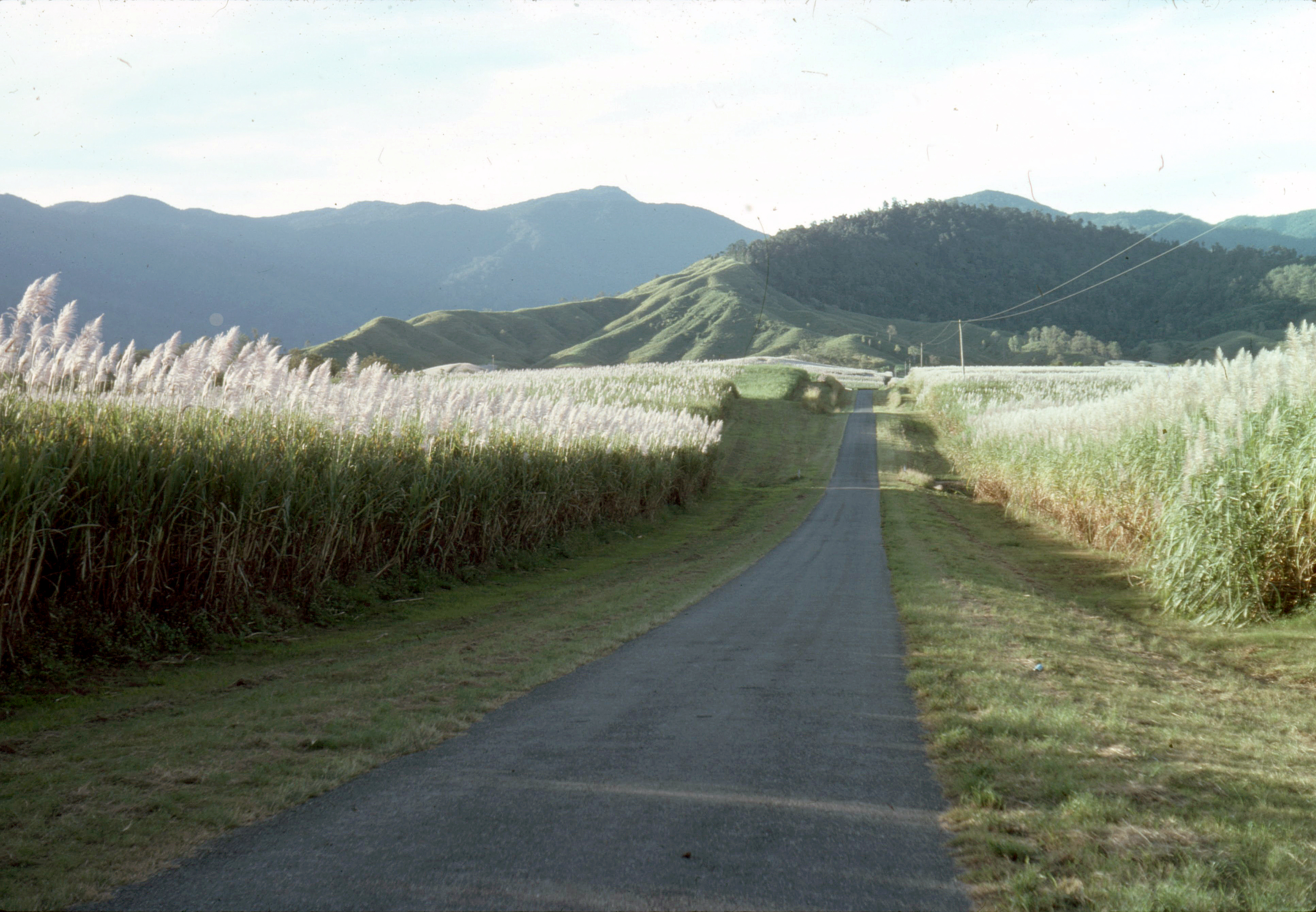
- Sugarcane fields at Owens Creek, 1976

- Interactive map of Owens Creek
- Coordinates: 21.0988°S 148.7138°E
- Country: Australia
- State: Queensland
- LGA: Mackay Region
- Location: 23.0 km (14.3 mi) NW of Mirani; 60.1 km (37.3 mi) W of Mackay; 1,027 km (638 mi) NNW of Brisbane

Government
  - State electorate: Mirani
  - Federal divisions: Capricornia; Dawson

Area
  - Total: 41.8 km^{2} (16.1 sq mi)

Population
  - Total: 193 (2021 census)
  - Density: 4.617/km^{2} (11.96/sq mi)
- Time zone: UTC+10:00 (AEST)
- Postcode: 4741
Suburbs around Owens Creek
Finch Hatton	Eungella Hinterland	Dows Creek
Finch Hatton	Owens Creek	Dows Creek
Finch Hatton	Pinnacle	Gargett

Owens Creek is a rural locality in the Mackay Region, Queensland, Australia. In the 2021 census, Owens Creek had a population of 193 people.

== Geography ==
Mount Castor is in the south-east of the locality (21.1185°S 148.7410°E), rising to 360 metres (1,180 ft) above sea level.

== History ==
The locality takes its name from the former Owens Creek railway station, assigned by the Queensland Railways Department on 16 March 1922.

The Mackay Railway was extended from Gargett to Owens Creek on 28 August 1922, with the locality being served by the following railway stations (from north to south):

- Owens Creek railway station (21.0840°S 148.7140°E)
- Pakula railway station (21.0877°S 148.7216°E)
- Abbottville railway station (21.0986°S 148.7277°E)
- Mount Castor railway station (21.12°S 148.73°E)

The railway line to Owen Creek closed on 23 March 1970, to be replaced initially by road haulage and then by an extension of the Marian sugar mill's local cane tramway network.

== Demographics ==
In the 2016 census, Owens Creek had a population of 156 people.

In the 2021 census, Owens Creek had a population of 193 people.

== Education ==
There are no schools in Owens Creek. The nearest government primary schools are Gargett State School in neighbouring Gargett to the south-east and Finch Hatton State School in neighbouring Finch Hatton to the south-west. The nearest government secondary school is Mirani State High School in Mirani to the south-east.
