= Pioneer River =

Pioneer
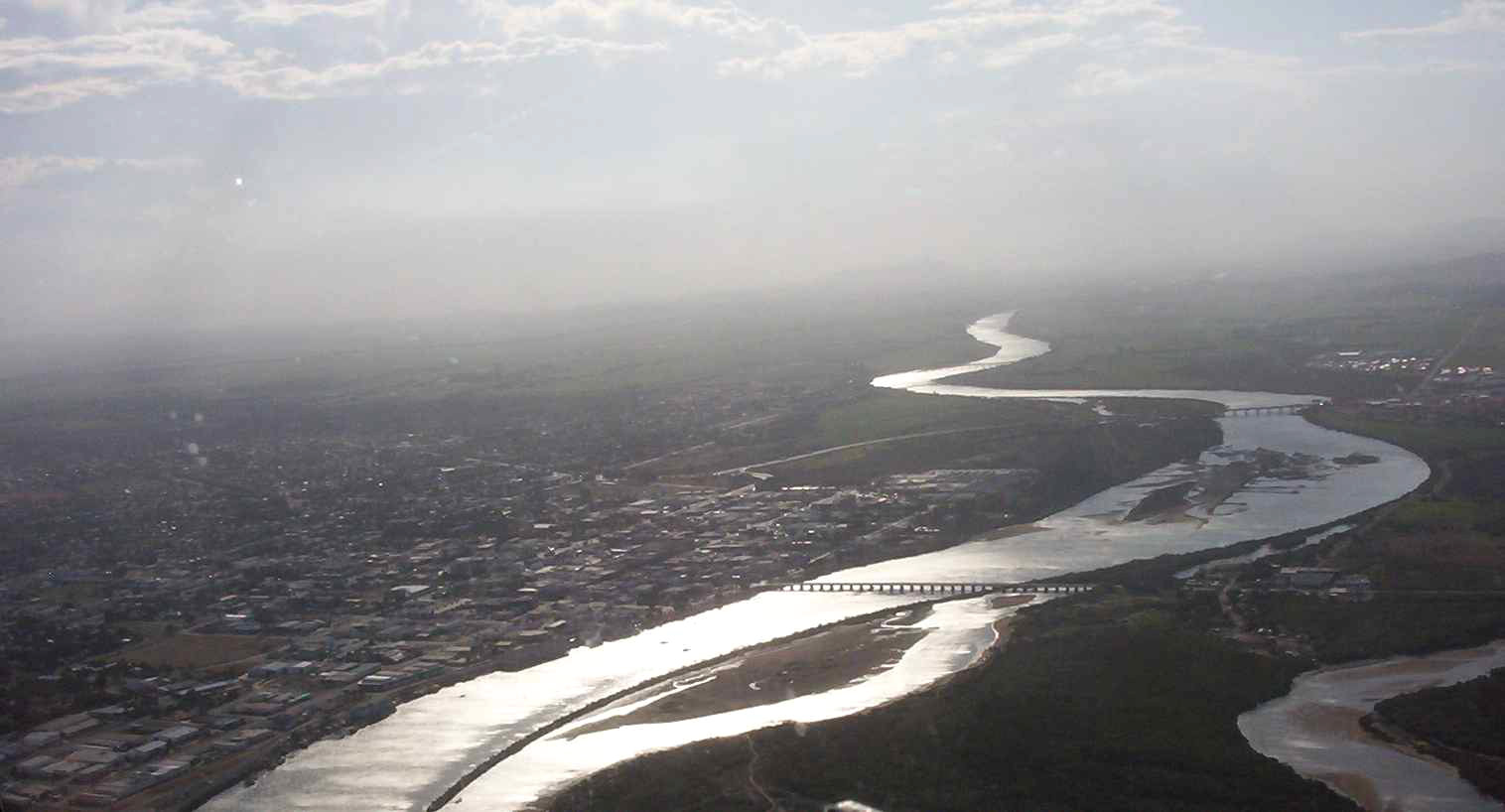
- The Pioneer River weaves through Mackay

- Location of Pioneer River river mouth in Queensland

Location
- Country: Australia
- State: Queensland
- Region: North Queensland
- Cities: Mackay, Marian

Physical characteristics
- Source: Pinnacle Ranges, Pioneer Valley, Eungella Dam
  - location: below Mount McBryde near Pinevale
  - coordinates: 21°18′58″S 148°51′01″E
  - elevation: 75 m (246 ft)
- Mouth: Coral Sea
  - location: East Mackay
  - coordinates: 21°09′13″S 149°13′16″E
  - elevation: 0 m (0 ft)
- Length: 120 km (75 mi)
- Basin size: 1,550 km^{2} (600 sq mi)
- Discharge
  - location: Near mouth
  - average: 25.75 m^{3}/s (813 GL/a)

Basin features
- Tributaries
  - left: Stockyard Creek (Queensland), Blacks Creek (Queensland), Bustard Creek, Cattle Creek (Queensland), McGregor Creek, Devereux Creek, Balnagowan Creek, Fursden Creek, Vines Creek
  - right: Black Waterhole Creek
- Waterbodies: Teemburra Dam; Dumbleton Weir; Mirani Weir; Marian Weir
- Bridges: Bruce Highway; North Coast railway line; Forgan Bridge

The Pioneer River is a river in North Queensland, Australia. The 120-kilometre (75 mi) long river flows through the city of Mackay.

== History ==
Captain John Mackay and his party were the first Europeans to discover the river in 1860. Mackay named it Mackay River after his father, George Mackay of Uralla in New South Wales. However, when George Bowen, the Governor of Queensland, visited on HMS Pioneer in October 1862, the name was changed to Pioneer River.

== Location and features ==
The river rises in the Pinnacle Ranges below Mount McBryde near Pinevale, Queensland, 63 kilometres (39 mi) southwest of Mackay. The river flows in a northerly direction into the Pioneer Valley. At Mirani the river flows to the east before reaching its mouth and emptying into the Coral Sea at Mackay. The river is joined by ten tributaries including Cattle Creek, Queensland (North Burnett Region) and Blacks Creek. The river is too shallow for navigation, drying sandbanks encountered only a few kilometres upstream of the river mouth. During king tides the Pioneer River may experience a tidal range of up to 6.4 metres (21 ft).

The catchment covers an area of 1,550 square kilometres (600 sq mi). Upper parts of the catchment are too steep for agriculture and remain covered by rainforests and open woodlands. In 2002, a Queensland Government report found that the local sugar industry had allowed five pesticides to enter the river, exceeding acceptable standards.

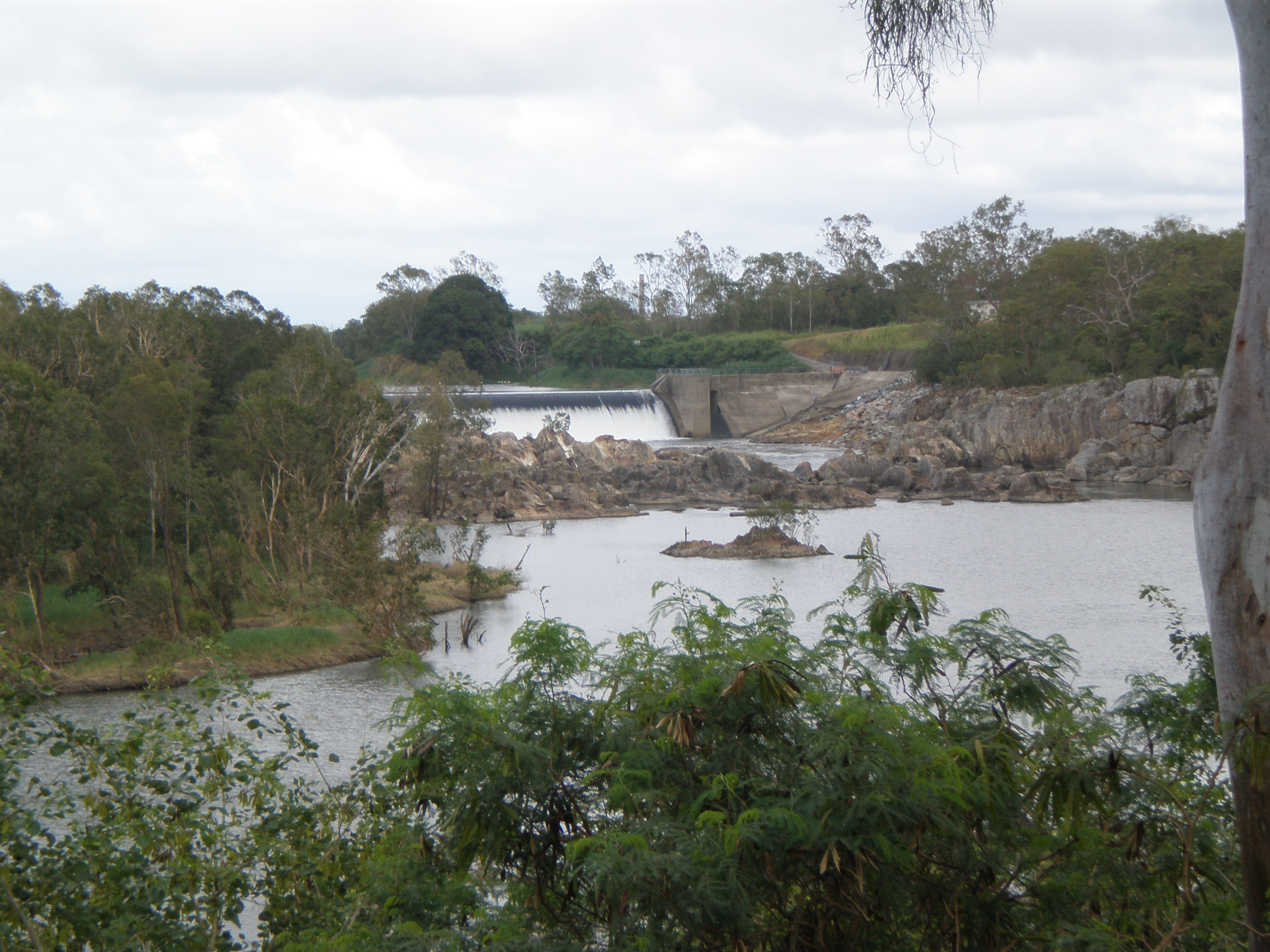
Dumbleton Weir located upstream of Mackay on the Pioneer River

The river has a number of water storage facilities built along its course including Teemburra Dam, Dumbleton Weir, Mirani Weir and Marian Weir. It is crossed by the Bruce Highway and the North Coast railway line in Mackay.

The river is crossed by the 485-metre (1,591 ft) Forgan Bridge at Mackay.

== Pioneer Valley ==
The Pioneer Valley is one of Australia's richest sugar cane areas. It runs for about 45 km from Netherdale in the west to Marian in the east. For much of its length it is drained by Cattle Creek, until that creek joins the Pioneer River near Benholme. The valley contains important sugar mills and contains linked railway lines as far west as Pinnacle.

In September 2022, the Queensland State Government's Premier, Annastacia Palaszczuk, announced a proposed pumped-storage hydroelectricity scheme that will involve flooding some land of the valley.

== Flooding ==
The river is prone to flooding, most recently in February 2008 when a height of just over 7 metres (23 ft) (classed as moderate flooding according to the Bureau of Meteorology) was recorded at a gauge in the centre of Mackay. This height was reached after extremely heavy rain fell over Mackay (600 millimetres, 24 in in 6 hours). After the devastating Mackay cyclone of 21 January 1918, the river was flooded for weeks. The Pioneer has reached major flood levels on twenty occasions since records first began in 1884, with the highest reaching 9.14 metres (30.0 ft) in 1958.

== See also ==
- List of rivers of Australia § Queensland
