= Benholme, Queensland =

Benholme
- Suburb
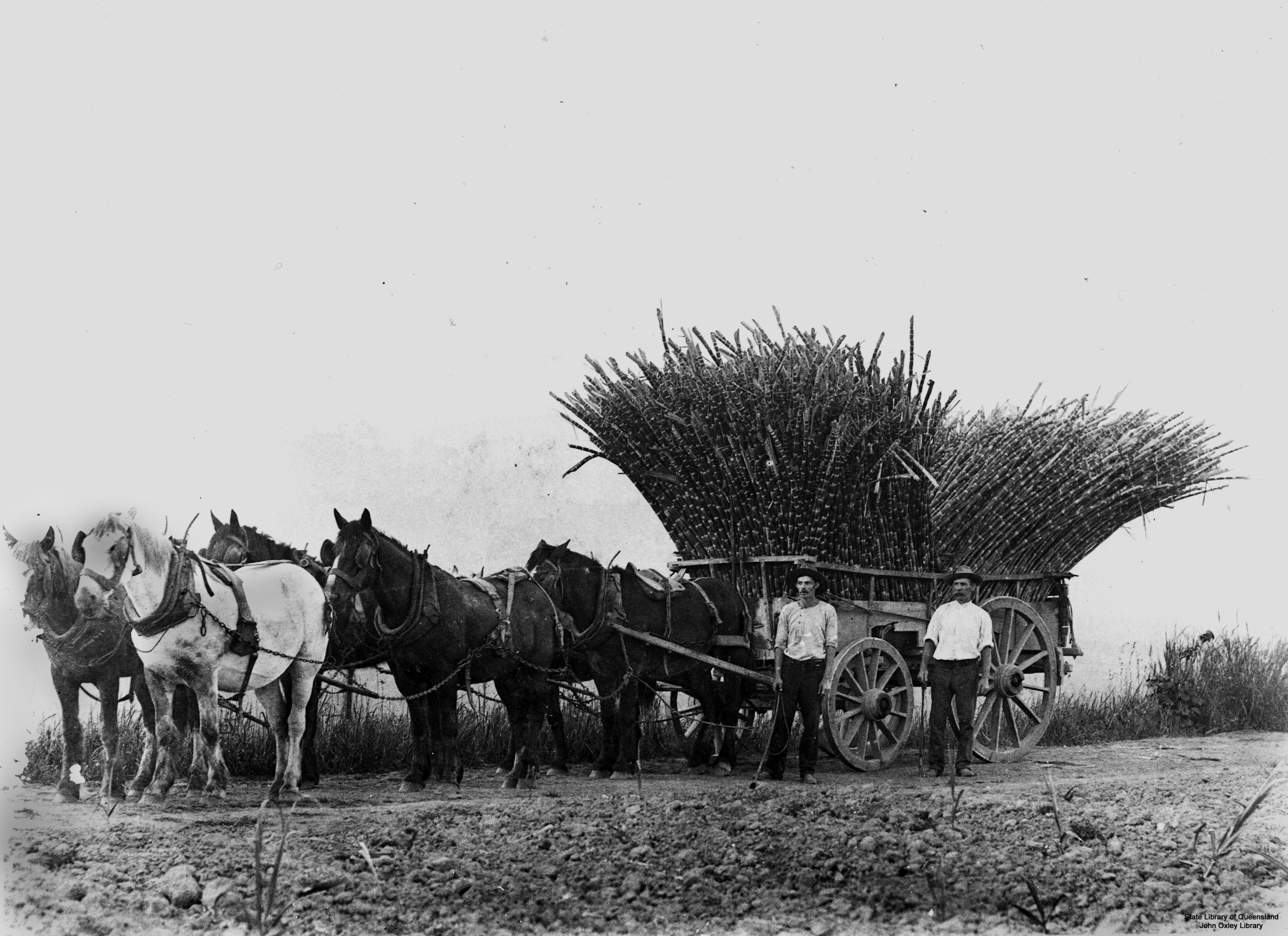
- Six horse team pulling a load of sugar cane at Benholme

- Interactive map of Benholme
- Coordinates: 21.1619°S 148.8030°E
- Country: Australia
- State: Queensland
- LGA: Mackay Region
- Location: 6.1 km (3.8 mi) WSW of Mirani; 43.2 km (26.8 mi) W of Mackay CBD; 999 km (621 mi) NNW of Brisbane

Government
  - State electorate: Mirani
  - Federal division: Capricornia

Area
  - Total: 28.5 km^{2} (11.0 sq mi)

Population
  - Total: 81 (2021 census)
  - Density: 2.842/km^{2} (7.36/sq mi)
- Time zone: UTC+10:00 (AEST)
- Postcode: 4754
Suburbs around Benholme
Dows Creek	Mount Martin	Mount Martin
Gargett	Benholme	Mirani
Septimus	Septimus	Mirani

Benholme is a rural locality in the Mackay Region, Queensland, Australia. In the 2021 census, Benholme had a population of 81 people.

== Geography ==
Benholme is bounded to the south-east by the Pioneer River and to the south by its tributary Cattle Creek.

The Mackay–Eungalla Road enters the locality from the north-east (Mirani) and exits the locality to the west (Gargett).

The land use is predominantly irrigated crop growing (mostly sugarcane) with some grazing on native vegetation. There is a network of cane tramways through the locality to transport harvested sugarcane to the sugar mills.

== Demographics ==
In the 2016 census, Benholme had a population of 91 people.

In the 2021 census, Benholme had a population of 81 people.

== Education ==
There are no schools in Benholme. The nearest government primary schools are Mirani State School in neighbouring Mirani to the east and Gargett State School in neighbouring Gargett to the west. The nearest government secondary school is Mirani State High School, also in Mirani.
