= Pinnacle, Queensland =

Pinnacle
- Town
- Interactive map of Pinnacle
- Coordinates: 21.1472°S 148.7133°E
- Country: Australia
- State: Queensland
- LGA: Mackay Region
- Location: 16.9 km (10.5 mi) W of Mirani; 53.7 km (33.4 mi) W of Mackay; 1,015 km (631 mi) NNW of Brisbane

Government
  - State electorate: Mirani
  - Federal division: Capricornia

Area
  - Total: 159.9 km^{2} (61.7 sq mi)

Population
  - Total: 211 (2021 census)
  - Density: 1.320/km^{2} (3.418/sq mi)
- Time zone: UTC+10:00 (AEST)
- Postcode: 4741
Localities around Pinnacle
Finch Hatton	Owens Creek	Gargett
Crediton	Pinnacle	Septimus
Crediton	Crediton	Septimus

Pinnacle is a rural town and locality in the Mackay Region, Queensland, Australia. In the 2021 census, the locality of Pinnacle had a population of 211 people.

== Geography ==
The locality is situated in the Pioneer Valley approximately 64 kilometres (39 mi) west of Mackay and close to the watersports and fishing area Teemburra Dam.

== History ==
In 1907, the Daily Mercury reported that a petition had been raised for a school to be established in the Pinnacle district. It was noted that the only available school was in Septimus which was difficult for children to access, particularly in poor weather. Pinnacle Provisional School opened on 4 June 1908. In 1908 it became Pinnacle State School.

Beatrice Creek State School opened on 2 November 1936 and closed on 30 April 1971.

== Demographics ==
In the 2016 census, the locality of Pinnacle had a population of 214 people.

In the 2021 census, the locality of Pinnacle had a population of 211 people.

== Education ==
Pinnacle State School is a government primary (Prep-6) school for boys and girls at Pinnacle Street (21.1498°S 148.7129°E). In 2018, the school had an enrolment of 13 students with 2 teachers (1 full-time equivalent) and 4 non-teaching staff (2 full-time equivalent). In 2023, the school had an enrolment of 14 students.

There are no secondary schools in Pinnacle. The nearest government secondary school is Mirani State High School in Mirani to the east.
