= Dows Creek =

- Suburb
- Interactive map of Dows Creek
- Coordinates: 21.0988°S 148.7638°E
- Country: Australia
- State: Queensland
- LGA: Mackay Region
- Location: 13.1 km (8.1 mi) NW of Mirani; 50.2 km (31.2 mi) WNW of Mackay CBD; 991 km (616 mi) NNW of Brisbane

Government
  - State electorate: Mirani
  - Federal division: Capricornia

Area
  - Total: 30.7 km^{2} (11.9 sq mi)

Population
  - Total: 146 (2021 census)
  - Density: 4.756/km^{2} (12.32/sq mi)
- Time zone: UTC+10:00 (AEST)
- Postcode: 4754
Suburbs around Dows Creek
Eungella Hinterland	Mount Charlton	Mount Martin
Owens Creek	Dows Creek	Mount Martin
Gargett	Gargett	Benholme

Dows Creek is a rural locality in the Mackay Region, Queensland, Australia. In the 2021 census, Dows Creek had a population of 146 people.

== Geography ==
Langdon is a neighbourhood within the locality (21.1000°S 148.7667°E).

== History ==
Langdon's Creek State School opened in 1921 and closed in 1930.

Dow's Creek Provisional School opened on 17 April 1895. On 1 January 1909, it became Dows Creek State School. It was mothballed on 31 December 2009 and closed on 31 December 2010. It was at 1081 Mount Ossa Road (21.1041°S 148.7735°E). The school's website was archived.

== Demographics ==
In the 2016 census, Dows Creek had a population of 136 people.

In the 2021 census, Dows Creek had a population of 146 people.

== Education ==
There are no schools in Dows Creek. The nearest government primary schools are Gargett State School in neighbouring Gargett to the south and Mirani State School in Mirani to the south-east. The nearest government secondary school is Mirani State High School, also in Mirani.

== Amenities ==
Dows Creek Community Hall is at 16 Bourkes Road.
