= Gargett, Queensland =

Gargett
- Town
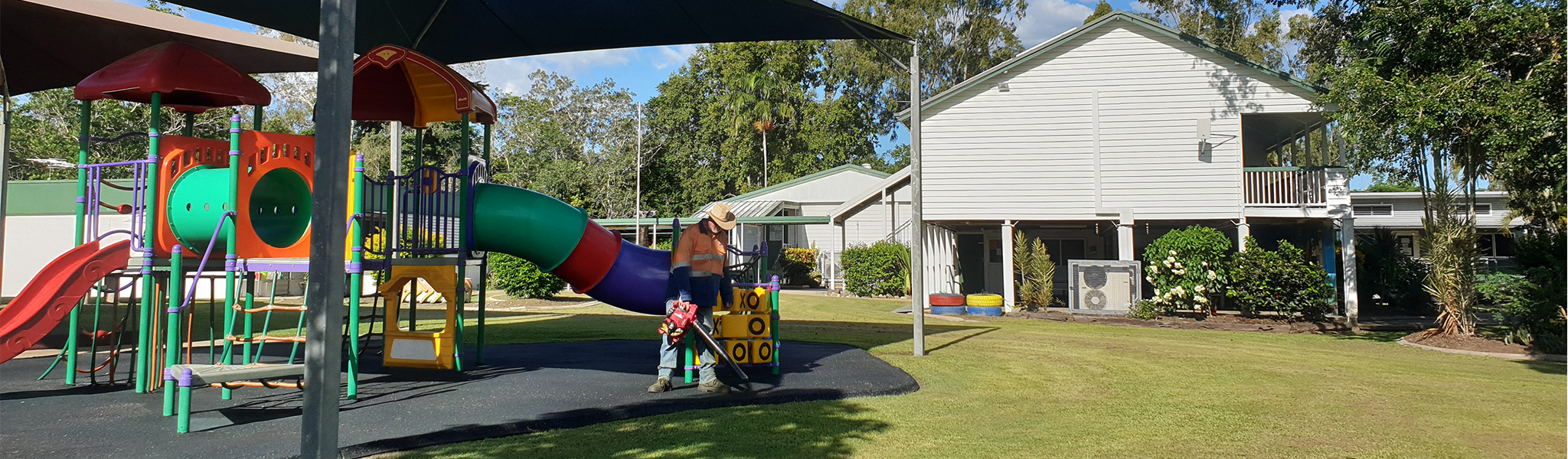
- Gargett State School, 2024

- Interactive map of Gargett
- Coordinates: 21.14°S 148.7580°E
- Country: Australia
- State: Queensland
- LGA: Mackay Region
- Location: 14.1 km (8.8 mi) W of Mirani; 51.1 km (31.8 mi) W of Mackay CBD; 1,007 km (626 mi) NNW of Brisbane

Government
  - State electorate: Mirani
  - Federal division: Capricornia

Area
  - Total: 34.6 km^{2} (13.4 sq mi)

Population
  - Total: 191 (2021 census)
  - Density: 5.520/km^{2} (14.30/sq mi)
- Time zone: UTC+10:00 (AEST)
- Postcode: 4741
Localities around Gargett
Owens Creek	Dows Creek	Dows Creek
Pinnacle	Gargett	Benholme
Septimus	Septimus	Septimus

Gargett is a rural locality in the Mackay Region, Queensland, Australia. In the 2021 census, the locality of Gargett had a population of 191 people.

== Geography ==
Gargett is in east central Queensland, located 52 kilometres (32 mi) from Mackay.

== History ==
The locality takes its name from the Gargett railway station, which in turn was named (but misspelled) after John Garget, a railway construction contractor.

Barker's Creek Provisional School opened on 16 September 1895. On 1 January 1909, it became Barker's Creek State School. It closed in 1954.

The railway from Paget reached Gargett in 1902. It was a busy station during the sugar crushing season.

Gargett Post Office opened by October 1910 (a receiving office had been open from 1909).

Gargett State School opened on 20 August 1914. The school celebrated its 100th anniversary on 20 August 2014.

== Demographics ==
In the 2016 census, the locality of Gargett had a population of 261 people.

In the 2021 census, the locality of Gargett had a population of 191 people.

== Education ==
Gargett State School is a government primary (Prep-6) school for boys and girls at Tom Lynch Street (21.1557°S 148.7407°E). In 2018, the school had an enrolment of 25 students with 3 teachers (1 full-time equivalent) and 4 non-teaching staff (2 full-time equivalent).

There are no secondary schools in Gargett. The nearest government secondary school is Mirani State High School in Mirani to the east.

== Amenities ==
The Mackay Regional Council operates a mobile library service on a fortnightly schedule at Mackay-Eungella Road.

The Gargett branch of the Queensland Country Women's Association meets at the QCWA Hall in Jim Moule Street.
