= Mackay Memorial Swimming Centre =

- Location within Queensland
- 21.1411°S 149.1777°E
- Location: 2 Milton Street, Mackay, Mackay Region, Queensland, Australia

History
- Design period: 1940s-1960s Post-WWII
- Built: 1963

Site notes
- Architect: Russell Gibbins
- Architectural style: Modernism

Queensland Heritage Register
- Official name: Mackay Memorial Swimming Centre; Mackay War Memorial Swimming Pool
- Type: state heritage
- Designated: 26 June 2020
- Reference no.: 650250
- Type: Monuments and Memorials: Memorial/Monument - war; Recreation and Entertainment: Swimming pool/Baths - in-ground
- Theme: Creating social and cultural institutions: Sport and recreation; Creating social and cultural institutions: Commemorating significant events

Mackay Memorial Swimming Centre is a heritage-listed war memorial and swimming pool at 2 Milton Street, Mackay, Mackay Region, Queensland, Australia. It was designed by Russell Gibbins and built in 1963. It is also known as Mackay War Memorial swimming pool. It was added to the Queensland Heritage Register on 26 June 2020.

== History ==
The Mackay Memorial Swimming Centre opened in December 1963 as a "living memorial", a war memorial which combines remembrance with community amenity. It honours all those from the Mackay district who lost their lives fighting in World War I or World War II. This public asset was constructed with an Olympic-sized 50-metre (160 ft) pool, children's wading pool, an entrance building, and a plant building, set in generous landscaped grounds. A war memorial mural made of Italian glass mosaic tiles is set into the front wall of the entrance building. The place has a strong and ongoing community association, and is important in demonstrating the historic pattern of war memorial swimming pool construction which peaked in Queensland during the 1950s-60s.

Mackay, part of the traditional land of the Yuwibara people, was surveyed in 1863 and developed as the centre of a major sugarcane-growing area. Following the devastating cyclone of January 1918, Mackay enjoyed a period of substantial growth. In 1938, the Forgan Bridge replaced an 1880s bridge across the Pioneer River, and in 1939, the new Port of Mackay was opened. Queensland's first bulk sugar handling terminal opened at this harbour in 1957.

Despite its growth and prosperity, the citizens of Mackay waited until the 1960s for a public swimming pool. Earlier proposals, either for swimming enclosures in the Pioneer River or baths on land, were made from at least 1879, but none came to fruition. A local boat builder offered to construct public baths upon the river bank. Other proposals included salt water baths at the corner of Victoria and Carlyle streets (c.1909), and a river pool (enclosed with war surplus torpedo netting), just upstream of the north end of the Sydney Street Bridge (1924). The demand for a public swimming facility was driven by a desire to escape the summer heat (while avoiding crocodiles and sharks), safely teach children to swim, and to attract tourists. One option utilised by keen local swimmers was a swimming hole on the north side of the river between the river wall and Cremorne. IT was an old swimming hole, located in the river downstream from the north end of the Forgan Bridge and previously silted up, but had been scoured out again by floods.

Sea bathing was popular in Western culture from the late 18th century, for health and hygiene reasons. Competitive swimming also developed during the 19th century, and increased in popularity in the early 20th century. In 1896 swimming was included in the modern Olympic Games (men only, until 1912), and in 1908 the Federation Internationale de Natation (FINA) was formed to standardise the rules for swimming, diving and water polo and ensure the direction of Olympic Games competitions for those sports. Swimming was given further impetus by the 1924 Olympic Games held in Paris, where an 8-lane pool measuring 50 metres in length by 20 metres in width was specially constructed at Tourelles for swimming events This set the 50 metres (160 ft) Olympic standard for pool length.

In Queensland, swimming for health, recreation and sport has a long history. In 1849, a bathing house (for private subscribers) was erected in the Brisbane River at "the Government Garden" in 1849. In 1857, a floating timber bath was moored to the bank of the Brisbane River at South Brisbane (almost opposite the end of Queen Street); it was 75 by 24 feet (22.9 by 7.3 m). In 1886, the Spring Hill Municipal Baths opened as the first in-ground public baths in Brisbane. In 1910, the first state school swimming pool in Queensland was opened at Junction Park State School in Brisbane. Brisbane's Fortitude Valley Baths, on the site of the earlier Booroodabin Baths (1901), were rebuilt in 1925–26 to the Olympic standard length, and subsequently replaced in 1985. The Dalby Olympic swimming pool opened in Dalby in 1936 and was Queensland's first 50-metre (160 ft) pool outside Brisbane. Australia's gold medals in swimming at the 1956 Melbourne Olympics increased interest in the sport, and in the construction of 50-metre (160 ft) swimming pools.

Mackay also sought an Olympic-sized pool. In late 1944, the Mackay City Council (MCC) employed architect Dr Karl Langer to design a town plan, and his May 1945 plan included a swimming pool near the centre of Mackay, as well as swimming pools in several of the six neighbourhoods he envisaged. The central swimming pool was planned on the block north of Alfred Street, between Gregory and Wood Streets. A neighbourhood planned for west of Milton Street and north of Shakespeare Street was also to include a pool just northeast of the Mackay General Cemetery, but this was never developed.

The MCC, however, preferred the current site of the Mackay Memorial Swimming Centre for a freshwater swimming pool. In 1947, Langer provided coloured perspective drawings and sketch plans for a 165-by-50-foot (50 by 15 m) pool, "to be constructed on the area at the end of Victoria and Gordon streets, with the entrance opening on to Milton Street". The site was expected to cover 2 hectares (4.9 acres) "when reclamation is completed". This land was previously part of a 2.6-hectare (6.4-acre) "Reserve for a Public Park and Recreation Ground", declared in 1881 at the western end of the Mackay CBD. In 1918, 3 acres (1.2ha) of the southern part of this land was gazetted as a separate "Reserve for Shire Council Purposes" (later gazetted as a "Reserve for Municipal Purposes" in 1919, but the northern section of this was reincorporated back into the south end of swimming pool site when Portion 388, of 4 acres, 2 roods and 33 perches, (1.9ha), was surveyed in 1948. The 1948 survey plan included a road easement drawn over "Alligator, or Dump Creek", along the western side of the pool site and a "rubbish dump" was indicated on the east bank of the creek, in the northwest corner of the current pool site. A 20-year-old railway fireman had been fatally mauled by a shark while swimming in Dump Creek in 1939.

Langer's 1947 perspective drawings included a long, low entrance building, with a hipped roof and an observatory balcony overlooking a rectangular 50m pool to the west, with a narrow, rectangular wading pool south of the 50m pool. A cafe at the southern end of the entrance building overlooked a dance floor/skating rink and a sound shell. Langer's entrance building included a filter room at its northern end. There were also garden plots and palms, three tiers of seats for spectators on the west side of the 50m pool, and an artificial beach. The description of Langer's pool complex in the 1947 article largely matches the (undated) copies of his drawings of a rectangular pool design. The MCC resolved that Langer should proceed with working plans for the pool.

The push to construct a swimming pool received a boost at a public meeting in March 1950, when a committee was formed. The meeting was called under the sponsorship of the Australian Natives' Association and including delegates from the Tourist Development Association and the Lifesavers' Club. It was noted that 25% of the district's school children could not swim and that tourists also needed facilities. By July 1950, when plans were approved, Langer's design had evolved to include an L-shaped pool. The pool would have underwater lighting, tiling of the guttering on the water line and edges of the pool, and a diving tower at the west end of the short arm of the L (north end of the pool). By 1950, the Mackay City Council had been seeking approval for the pool from the Queensland Government "for several years". However, the full concept never came to fruition, as the MCC was unable to borrow funds for the project. In June 1952, the new Labor city council cancelled Langer's project.

A new effort to obtain a 50m pool was soon started, prompted by the drownings of two local boys during 1953. In December 1953, it was noted that Rockhampton was attempting to fund an Olympic-sized pool through voluntary donations. A public meeting on 30 March 1954, called by the Mackay Trotting Club and attended by 15 local civic and sporting bodies' representatives, elected a committee to investigate construction of the pool. It was hoped that, after community fundraising, the MCC could apply for a government subsidy, build an L-shaped pool initially, and add supporting facilities later. In 1951, the estimate for Langer's pool, by itself, had been £42,000. With the pavilion, paving, lawns, accommodation for a manager and caretaker, a dance floor, café, and sound shell, the total cost of the Langer scheme would have been £120,600. A subcommittee was formed to examine Langer's plan alongside the plans (and costs) of public pools in other towns, including Dalby and Townsville. The Olympic-sized pool in Townsville was initially commenced in 1941 purely as a civic amenity, but after public complaints about such expenditure in wartime, it was decided to dedicate it to those Australians who had fought and died during the Siege of Tobruk in Libya during 1941. In April 1954, the Mackay committee expressed a desire that Mackay's baths "be erected as a memorial to Mackay members of the forces who lost their lives in World Wars I and II".

The concept of a swimming pool as a war memorial was related to a debate which had occurred in Australia after World War I (WWI), on the nature of commemoration. WWI memorials took a variety of forms in Australia, including honour boards, stone monuments and tree-lined memorial avenues; as well as utilitarian (useful) structures such as gates, halls, clocks and (less commonly) swimming pools. Most Australian localities decided on a monumental approach (60%), with only 22% choosing utilitarian buildings (mostly halls) and 18% choosing the compromise position of utilitarian monuments - including a clock on a cenotaph, for example. In Mackay, the World War I Cenotaph was unveiled adjacent to the Sydney Street Bridge in 1929 (later moved to Jubilee Park). A proposal for memorial baths, proposed in 1925, was dismissed by one letter to the editor from "a soldier's mother" as being "ridiculous", as she believed a monument would last longer, and river baths might be swept away, or might be used by those who had refused to serve. From 1927 to 1973, gifts of over £1 for public war memorials were tax deductible, which assisted fundraising for memorials. A 1973 amendment to the Commonwealth's Income Tax Assessment Act limited tax deductions to donations to WWI or WWII war memorial funds that had been established before 21 September 1973, which effectively halted the building of further utilitarian war memorials.

The argument over whether the local war memorial should be monumental or useful was repeated all over Australia after WWI. Utilitarians believed that their approach was more enlightened and humane, and that monuments would lose significance as memory vanished, whereas a memorial which included human service would be a "living witness". In response, monumentalists argued that utilitarian solutions were at the mercy of progress, would become outmoded, and their meaning would be forgotten. Only monuments could inspire the appropriate sombre sentiments, and it was not really "commemoration" if a necessary public facility was labelled a memorial. Some communities solved the problem by building two memorials: one utilitarian, and one monumental. For example Bundaberg, as well as unveiling a digger statue in 1921, opened its 30-metre (98 ft) Returned Soldiers Memorial Baths in November 1923.

When it was time to commemorate World War II (WWII), utilitarian memorials were more popular, and were supported by the Returned Sailors', Soldiers' and Airmen's Imperial League of Australia (RSSAILA). Such memorials included halls, libraries, meeting rooms, council chambers, lawn bowls clubs, playgrounds, hospitals, and kindergartens. Fewer monuments were built to honour those who served or fell in WWII or the wars that followed. Typically, tributes were added onto or near existing WWI monuments. Mackay has several forms of monumental memorials to WWII, including stone plinths near the WWI cenotaph; memorial gates at the corner of Malcomson Street and Willis Street in North Mackay (1952); and a Rats of Tobruk monument at Queen's Park, East Mackay (2001). Some towns which had chosen utilitarian monuments after WWI, chose monuments after WWII. Stone digger statues were not used after WWII, although there were some bronze sculptures.

One form of utilitarian memorial rare after WWI, but more popular after WWII, was a public swimming pool, usually paid for by a mixture of municipal and tax-assisted private funding. War memorial elements, designed to distinguish memorial pools from non-memorial pools, could range from including "memorial" in the name of the pool, to plaques, flagpoles, war-related objects on display, or trophy guns next to the entrance. Queensland's post-war memorial pools increasingly adopted a key role in building local communities. Enjoying a public pool not only contributed to physical and mental fitness, but also commemorated those who have given their lives (and bodies) to preserve the Australian way of life.

A number of war memorial public swimming pools were built in Queensland's towns and cities after WWII, prior to Mackay's. As well as the Tobruk Memorial Baths in Townsville (opened 1950), other memorial pools included those at Aramac (1952); Mitchell and Stones Corner (known as Langlands Park) 1955); Hughenden and Richmond (1956); Cecil Plains (1959); Gympie, Rockhampton (Lion Creek Road), and Toowoomba (1960); Corinda, Ipswich, and Maryborough (1961); Cairns, Chinchilla, Ingham, and Longreach (1962); and Goondiwindi (7 December 1963). The Mount Isa Mines Company also built a memorial pool for its employees in 1949 and memorial pools were opened at educational institutions, including Gatton Agricultural College and Brisbane Boys Grammar School (both in 1954). Memorial pools that opened in Queensland after Mackay include Yeronga (1965), Childers (1966), Clifton, Miles, Oakey, and Tully (1967), Mundubbera (1969), Laidley and Redcliffe (1971), Charters Towers (1972), and Alpha (1981).

While each pool complex was individually designed, they all included a standard-sized swimming pool (25m or Olympic-size 50m); an entrance building containing separate changing rooms for men and women (some with partly open-air roofs, which was believed to kill germs and aid in the drying process); and an open, landscaped site with pathways, lawns, trees and bench seating. Many also incorporated a shallow wading pool for children. The entrance building was often symmetrical, constructed from solid materials like brick and concrete, and change rooms had high-level windows or ventilation (e.g. breezeblocks, louvres, etc.). Circulation through the building was carefully organised, directing the sexes through their own changing rooms and out to the pool area. In line with contemporary architectural trends, some buildings were designed in an expressive, mid-century modern style, with features such as flat or butterfly-shaped roof forms, selective expression of materials and structural systems, and a horizontal, streamlined aesthetic.

Mackay's City Engineer and his staff drew up the plan for a swimming pool that was approved by the "Mackay swimming baths investigating committee" in June 1954. The inspiration for its layout and construction was Townsville's Tobruk baths. The Mackay and District War Memorial Baths Committee was later formed at a public meeting in January 1955. The projected cost by then was either £86,000 for an L-shaped pool with amenities, or £75,000 for a rectangular pool and amenities. It was hoped that some money could be raised from public donations, and that the Queensland Government would also offer a 25% subsidy, but the MCC's inability to borrow the remainder of the money again stalled construction. The MCC could not get government approval for a pool in 1955, even after meeting with the Queensland Treasurer.

Locals were not ready to give up on their pool, and in late 1957 the Mackay Rotary Club decided to raise funds. In January 1959, 250 men from the RSSAILA, Rotary, Jaycees, Royal Australian Air Force, and Mackay swimming clubs began canvassing the city area to ascertain support for construction of War Memorial Swimming Baths. By December 1961, the Mackay swimming baths appeal was less than £4000 short of its £20,000 target, and an Art Union raffle, with a house as first prize, was held to raise the remainder, being drawn in May 1962. The resulting proceeds of £4112/12/11 exceeded the target. All building materials and labour for the house were donated by the Mackay community.

Construction began at the Milton Street site in March 1963, after the loan application was successful and a subsidy was provided. The site was gazetted as a 1.6 hectares (4.0 acres) Reserve for Local Government (Swimming Pool) Purposes, from 9 August 1963.

The new facility had a 50m eight-lane swimming pool, a children's wading pool, and generous landscaped grounds, all designed by the Mackay City Engineer's office. However, the entrance building was designed by local architect Russell Gibbins (anf he probably also designed the plant building, based on the similarity of its style and structure to the entrance building). Gibbins established his architectural practice in Mackay in October 1954, having previously worked on the Gold Coast. He was known for designing in a contemporary, modernist aesthetic, with one of his most prominent projects in the region being the Mackay Harbour Board Building (opened 1966, demolished c. 2015).

As depicted in Gibbins' August 1959 concept sketches, the entrance building was a symmetrical, brick and concrete building with a butterfly roof and banks of high-level, fixed, horizontal concrete fins providing ventilation to the changing rooms. It also featured a protruding front porch and flagpoles to the street frontage, a kiosk at the rear, and a manicured landscape with palm trees. The design was similar to Rockhampton's 1960 WWII Memorial pool, which also had a butterfly roof, a central projecting front porch, and changing rooms open to the sky, with window fins for ventilation. Some elements were not constructed, including a large fountain, a diving platform, a second storey above the kiosk, and flanking decorative screen walls at either end of the building. The internal layout of the entrance building was symmetrical, with a central foyer and office with ticket counters, and the one-way circulation pattern was controlled by turnstiles. The changing rooms comprised a large changing area, with an open-air section of roof in the middle, with benches (including terrazzo privacy screens in the female section), showers and toilets. The toilets included a separate section only accessible from the pool area.

The memorial elements of the design were located on the street-facing side of the entrance building. The name "Memorial Swimming Centre" was fixed to the entrance portico fascia in large lettering. On the wall to the left of the main entrance was a 2.7 by 1.5 metres (8 ft 10 in by 4 ft 11 in) mural made of Italian glass mosaic tiles, designed by Gibbins, and built by Bill Smith, a local stonemason, plasterer and tiler, who was also a returned serviceman. Originally from Melbourne, during the 1950s-60s, Bill Smith also created the large slouch hat which sits on top of what used to be the RSL Building in Sydney Street, Mackay (still extant 2020) and large Fred Flintstone and Snoopy figures, an 'Old Woman's Shoe', at J.M. Mulherin Memorial Park at Mackay Harbour (extant 2020), and a stone feature wall at the Harbour Lights Café, Mackay Harbour (demolished). He also constructed similar feature walls on a number of homes throughout Mackay, as well as completing work on the Post Office, Sugar Research Institute and the Altar of St Patricks Catholic Church in River Street. The mural at the swimming centre included figures representing the Australian Navy, Army and Air Force, a Lancaster bomber, a battleship and a submarine, an Owen gun, the hills of New Guinea and the sands of Egypt, while in the background the sun shone on a dove of peace and the Southern Cross. Bronze wreaths were attached on either side of the mosaic, which included the words "Dedicated to the Fallen of Mackay and District, Lest We Forget". A bronze plaque commemorating the official opening of the centre was attached to the opposite wall, and three flagpoles were positioned off-centre from the entrance on a small front lawn.

The curvilinear children's wading pool with a small fountain was located to the south of the 50m pool, with the area between the two pools and entrance building landscaped with concrete pathways and curved lawns, edged with small shrubs. Palm trees were planted around the perimeter of the complex, with other trees on the lawn areas around the pools. Other features around the pools included six light poles, timber seating with concrete bases and metal-framed sun shades, drinking fountains, and two spectator stands on the west side of the 50m pool. A plant building, including two large open-roofed sand filter beds, was located to the north of the entrance building. The plant building was designed to match the entrance building, with identical concrete fin windows; although it did not have a butterfly roof. The Mackay City Council coat of arms ornamented the east facade. The original colour scheme of the complex, as seen in Gibbin's 1959 concept sketches and 1960s photographs, was predominately white, blue and yellow; with yellow used on the fascia of the front and rear porticos of the entrance building, and the bench seating and spectator stands. Similar tones of blue and yellow are present on Gibbin's mural. In 2020, the 50m pool still has its blue and white "random mosaic" tiles and blue nosing tiles, cladding the top of the pool edges and starting blocks. The floor and perimeter step of the wading pool is still clad with white, blue and light blue random mosaic tiles, with white nosing tiles. Square "Artic Blue" tiles lined the sides of the starting blocks of the 50m pool, and the gutter and top part of each side of that pool (with more random mosaic tiles below them at each end of the pool), as well as the step risers of the wading pool.

The "Memorial Swimming Centre" cost £90,000 (including £52,000 for the 50m pool and treatment plant, £6000 for the wading pool, £30,000 for the entrance building, and £2000 sundries).The sources of finance were: £22,000 raised from the community by the appeal committee, a £15,000 government subsidy, and £53,000 from loan funds. The swimming centre was officially opened on 14 December 1963, by the Postmaster-General and Federal member for Dawson, Charles William Davidson. Around 1500 people attended. Music was provided by the Mackay City Band, while local Guides, Scouts, Sea Cadets and Air Training Corps were also present, and the guard of honour was provided by D Company, 2 Battalion, Royal Queensland Regiment, of Mackay. The Last Post was played, followed by three volleys, and then the Reveille. The dedication was performed by Archdeacon JHR Innes, of the Church of England. In his speech, Davidson noted that the centre had been established as a memorial to those who lost their lives in two wars, "but it was also a memorial to those who served their country and returned. What was important was that it was a living memorial - something that could be used and not just looked at". On 14 December 1963 the Mackay Daily Mercury published a letter from a reader, which emphasised that the swimming pool would "honour our servicemen who fought so gallantly to give us a free and wholesome life and on their behalf an opportunity for the people of Mackay and district to enjoy themselves and the prospect for the rising generation to learn to swim well".

Over the decades, many war memorial swimming pools from the 1950s, 60s and 70s have undergone substantial refurbishment and alterations, and some have been closed (e.g. Ipswich, Gympie). Others remain open, with the "memorial" aspect dropped from their name (Chinchilla). Major alterations have included replacement of the original pools (Alpha and the Tobruk baths in Townsville). In some cases, new pools were built at different locations within the complexes (Cairns, Mitchell, Rockhampton [Lion Creek Road], and Langlands Park). In some cases, enclosed roofs have been constructed over pools which disrupts the original open, landscaped aesthetic (Childers, Clifton, and Redcliffe). There have also been changes to the roof form of the entrance buildings (Proserpine and Goondiwindi) and construction of new changing rooms and repurposing of original entrance buildings (Rockhampton [Lion Creek Road]) or full or partial demolition of entrance buildings (Alpha, Maryborough, Mount Isa, and the Tobruk pool in Cairns).

Since 1963, there have been some changes at the Mackay Memorial Swimming Centre, but the layout and main elements of the complex remain. At Mackay, the entrance building has undergone minor changes and upgrades, including the conversion of the externally-accessible male toilets into an equitable access toilet and changing room, and the creation of an opening between the two sections of the female toilets (c. 2000). The supporting metal posts and timber rafters that crossed the open-air sections of the changing room roofs have been removed, while the fixed concrete fins in the north and south end walls have also been removed and replaced with concrete breeze blocks (post-2006). The flagpoles in front of the entrance building were removed post-2006. The plant building has had two extensions to the west, and a clubroom building was constructed to the north of the plant building between 1982 and 1987. Two viewing stands on the west side of the 50m pool have been removed, with their supporting concrete slabs remaining. The timber changing room benches were also replaced, post-2006.

More swimming pools have opened in Mackay since 1963, as the population of the urban area increased from 16,809 in 1961, to 77,293 in 2011. A 50m pool opened at the Pioneer Swim Centre in North Mackay in 1977, and the Bluewater Lagoon, a family leisure park on the riverfront east of Caneland, opened in 2008. In October 2011, the Mackay Regional Council closed the Mackay Memorial Swimming Centre on weekends to save on costs, but community protests and a petition signed by 5500 people led to its reopening in mid-2012. In 2019, the new Mackay Aquatic and Recreation Complex (MARC), including a 50m pool, opened at Ooralea. As at 2020, the Mackay War Memorial Swimming Centre continues in use and remains valued by the community for its role in aiding remembrance, and for its role in facilitating competitive swimming in Mackay. Since its opening, the centre has been used by Olympians Justin Lemberg, Jan Campbell, Geoff Huegill, Linda Mackenzie, Nick Ffrost, and Rebecca Kemp, as well as Paralympian Logan Powell, and Junior Olympians Justin James and Meg Harris. It retains its entrance building, with its original signage and mural; 50m and wading pools; plant building; and its original layout of paths, lawns and tree plantings, along with original seating.

== Description ==
The 1963 Mackay Memorial Swimming Centre occupies a large site at the western edge of the Mackay central business district. It addresses a main thoroughfare, Milton Street, to the east and is bounded by Victoria Street to the north, undeveloped land to the west, and Gordon Street, a major entry point to the city centre, to the south.

The entrance building stands near the centre of the Milton Street boundary, with the plant building located to its north. The Olympic-sized 50m swimming pool is located immediately behind the Entrance and Plant buildings, and the curvilinear wading pool to the southwest of the entrance building. Between the pools and the entrance building are formal landscaped lawns, garden beds and paths. To the south, west and north of the pools are open lawns and a variety of mature trees, including rows of palms around the perimeter.

=== Entrance building (1963) ===
The entrance building is a long, single-storey, brick and concrete building with a butterfly roof. It has an expressive, mid-century modern style featuring angled walls and contrasting use of materials. It has high levels of natural ventilation provided by bands of high-level, fixed, horizontal concrete fins along the east and west walls.

The plan is largely symmetrical, and contains a central entrance, offices and refreshment kiosk, with changing room wings on either side (male changing rooms to the north and female to the south). Angled walls in the main entrance foyer direct patrons towards the changing rooms, which are accessed through built-in metal turnstiles. Each changing room wing contains a shower block near the centre of the building, a changing area with open roof in the middle, and toilets at the far ends of the building. The refreshment kiosk faces the pool area and is accessed through the central office.

=== War Memorial Mural and Plaque (1963) ===
Set into the front wall of the entrance building on the south side of the main entrance is a large, rectangular mural constructed from a mosaic of square glass tiles. It has a grey border, edged in black, containing the words "DEDICATED TO THE FALLEN OF MACKAY AND DISTRICT" in the top panel and "LEST WE FORGET" in the bottom panel. The side panels have brass wreaths attached. The central image is a landscape scene featuring stylized depictions of three Australian servicemen (representing the navy, army and air force), a Lancaster Bomber plane, a battleship, a submarine, an Owen submachine gun, a Christian cross, a dove, and the Southern Cross. In the background, light and medium blue tiles represent the sky and sea respectively, yellow tiles a ray of sunlight, and green tiles the hills of New Guinea.

On the opposite side of the main entrance is a rectangular brass plaque signed by the mayor, J Binnington, commemorating the official opening of the Memorial Swimming Centre by the Hon. CW Davidson OBE on 14 December 1963.

=== Exterior landscaping (1963) ===
Adjoining the east and west sides of the entrance building are original landscaping elements.

=== Plant building (1963) ===
The plant building has a complementary aesthetic to the entrance building and stands on a similar street front alignment. The entrance is through a recessed doorway in the centre of the south elevation, and non-significant additions have been made to the western side. The interior comprises a large main room with two smaller side rooms, one of them a former shower; and two open-roofed filter bed compartments, accessed from above by a hatch in the roof of the large main room. An original store room, accessed via an external door, is located at the northern end of the western elevation.

=== 50m swimming pool and wading pool (1963) ===
The 50m swimming pool and wading pool remain in their original locations and retain most of their original tiles.

=== Formal pool landscaping (1963) ===
The formal landscaped area around the pools and between the pools and entrance building includes concrete pavement pools surrounds, curved and straight paths, curvilinear lawns, and amenities such as benches and drinking fountains.

=== Grounds ===
The grounds to the north, west and south of the formal pool landscaping area, which comprise open lawns, mature shade trees and perimeter plantings of palms, provide outdoor recreation space and an attractive backdrop to the pool complex.

== Heritage listing ==
Mackay Memorial Swimming Centre was listed on the Queensland Heritage Register on 26 June 2020 having satisfied the following criteria.

The place is important in demonstrating the evolution or pattern of Queensland's history.

The Mackay Memorial Swimming Centre (1963) is important in demonstrating Queensland's involvement in a major world event. In its form, fabric, materials and layout it is an important example of a post-World War II (WWII) utilitarian war memorial: a "living memorial" with a dual role of providing commemoration and a community facility.

The centre is also important in demonstrating the pattern of increased public swimming pool construction after WWII, and the associated increased popularity of competitive swimming in this period. Memorial pool construction peaked in Queensland during the 1950s-60s.

The place is important in demonstrating the principal characteristics of a particular class of cultural places.

The Mackay Memorial Swimming Centre (1963) is an intact example of a memorial swimming pool complex from the 1950s-60s. In its form, style, materials and layout it is important in demonstrating the principal characteristics of this type. This includes its: dual role as a public asset providing commemoration and a sports and recreation facility; central location; entrance building; plant building; 50m swimming pool; wading pool; site layout incorporating formal pool landscaping; and open grounds for recreation space.

The entrance building retains its: expressive, mid-century modern style featuring angled walls and butterfly roof; memorial signage, mural and commemorative plaque; symmetrical layout; high-level windows; separate male and female changing rooms, partly open-air with privacy partitions in the female changing room; office and store rooms; refreshment kiosk; and evidence of its former circulation pattern, including original turnstiles.

The plant building, designed to complement the entrance building, retains its original form, materials and high-level windows.

The 50m and Wading pools remain in their original locations and retain their form and materials, including original tiles. The formal pool landscaping area retains its: open environment; concrete pavement pool surrounds, original layout of lawns, concrete pathways, spoon drains and garden beds; concrete and timber bench seats; and early drinking fountains. The wider grounds retain their open landscape character of lawns, mature shade trees and perimeter plantings of rows of palms.

The place is important because of its aesthetic significance.

The Mackay Memorial Swimming Centre is important for its aesthetic significance. Retaining a high degree of integrity, the complex displays attributes of cohesion and legibility through its unified mid-century modern aesthetic treatment and materials; and the arrangement of components including buildings, pools, and landscaping elements in an attractive open landscape setting fringed with mature trees and palms.

The war memorial mural, located prominently on the front wall of the entrance building, demonstrates expressive qualities for its commemoration of the Mackay community's contribution to WWII, and its high quality design, materials and craftsmanship.

The place has a strong or special association with a particular community or cultural group for social, cultural or spiritual reasons.

The Mackay Memorial Swimming Centre is highly valued by the community for its symbolic, cultural and social associations, having a long, special and enduring connection with the people of Mackay and the surrounding district as a living war memorial.

Community meetings, lobbying, fundraising and donations played a key role in the realisation of the Mackay Memorial Swimming Centre. As well as its role in remembrance, the centre has provided a safe swimming environment and community recreation space, and has contributed to the development of competitive swimming in Mackay.
