= Mackay Ring Road =

Road in Queensland, Australia

Mackay Ring Road Queensland
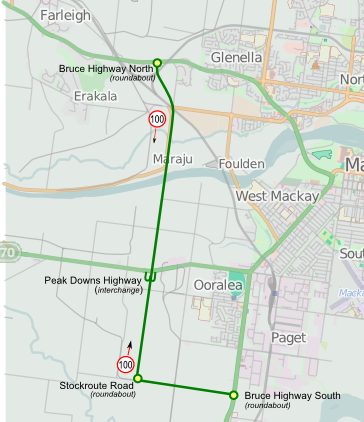
- Map of Stage 1 of proposed ring road

General information
- Type: Highway (Under construction)
- Length: 21 km (13 mi)
- Ring road around: Mackay

Major junctions
- South end: Bruce Highway (National Highway A1), Bakers Creek
- Peak Downs Highway (State Route 70); Bruce Highway, Glenella
- Northeast end: Harbour Road

Location(s)
- Major settlements: Bakers Creek, Ooralea, Racecourse, Foulden, Glenella, Mount Pleasant, North Mackay, Mackay Harbour

Highway system
- Highways in Australia; National Highway • Freeways in Australia; Highways in Queensland

The Mackay Ring Road is a bypass route near Mackay, Queensland, Australia The proposed full length of the road is 21 kilometres (13 mi) long and will be built in 3 stages. Stage 1 opened in September 2020.

Stage 1 is 11.34 kilometres (7.05 mi) in length and connects the Bruce Highway to the south of Mackay (at Stockroute Road) with the Bruce Highway to the north of Mackay (near Bald Hill Road). It includes a new bridge over the Pioneer River and an interchange with the Peak Downs Highway. It provides a bypass of Mackay for Bruce Highway traffic that is immune to flooding and free of signalised intersections. Stage 1 of the project was expected to cost $540 million, 80% of the funding was from the Commonwealth and the remaining 20% from Queensland.

Stage 2 is 8.2 kilometres (5.1 mi) in length. It will connect Stage 1 near the Bruce Highway at Glenella to Harbour Road at Mackay Harbour. The route will follow the Mackay Harbour Railway (Port Rail Line).

Stage 3 is 1.4 kilometres (0.87 mi) in length. An additional connection from Stage 2 to the Port and Slade Point Road.

It was expected that many vehicles would bypass the city once completed.

== Construction ==
=== Milestones ===
- October 2011 – Planning Study commences
- February 2012 – Analysis and evaluation of alignment options
- May 2012 – Business Case for preferred alignment commences, community consultations
- 13 November 2012 – Approval to proceed to design stage
- January 2014 – Preliminary design phase begins, Initial ground survey and soil testing
- 2015 – Detailed design work commenced
- Mid 2017 – Construction of stage 1 commenced
- 5 September 2020 – Completion of Stage 1 and opening.

== Upgrades ==
=== Extend to Bald Hill Road ===
A project to extend the ring road to Bald Hill Road, at a cost of $497.3 million, was in detailed design in November 2021.

=== Mackay Port access ===
A project to provide access to Mackay Port, at a cost of $350 million, was in planning in July 2022,

== See also ==
- Bruce Highway
- Mackay Transport
