= Te Kowai, Queensland =

Te Kowai
- Suburb
- Interactive map of Te Kowai
- Coordinates: 21.1875°S 149.1113°E
- Country: Australia
- State: Queensland
- LGA: Mackay Region
- Location: 11.1 km (6.9 mi) SW of Mackay CBD; 947 km (588 mi) NNW of Brisbane

Government
  - State electorate: Mirani
  - Federal division: Capricornia

Area
  - Total: 16.6 km^{2} (6.4 sq mi)
- Elevation: 0–10 m (0–33 ft)

Population
  - Total: 227 (2021 census)
  - Density: 13.67/km^{2} (35.42/sq mi)
- Time zone: UTC+10:00 (AEST)
- Postcode: 4740
- Mean max temp: 27.8 °C (82.0 °F)
- Mean min temp: 16.6 °C (61.9 °F)
- Annual rainfall: 1,666.8 mm (65.62 in)
Suburbs around Te Kowai
Erakala	Erakala	Foulden
Alexandra	Te Kowai	Racecourse; Ooralea
Palmyra	Sandiford	Bakers Creek

Te Kowai is a rural locality in the Mackay Region, Queensland, Australia. In the 2021 census, Te Kowai had a population of 227 people.

== Geography ==
The locality is bounded by the Pioneer River to the north, by the Mackay Ring Road to the north-east and east, and Bakers Creek (the watercourse) to the south-west and south.

The land is flat and low-lying, between 0 to 10 metres (0 to 33 ft) above sea level, and is used for growing sugarcane.

The Peak Downs Highway enters the locality from the east (Racecourse) and exits to the west (Alexandra).There is a network of cane tramways in the locality to transport the harvested sugarcane to the sugar mills.

== History ==
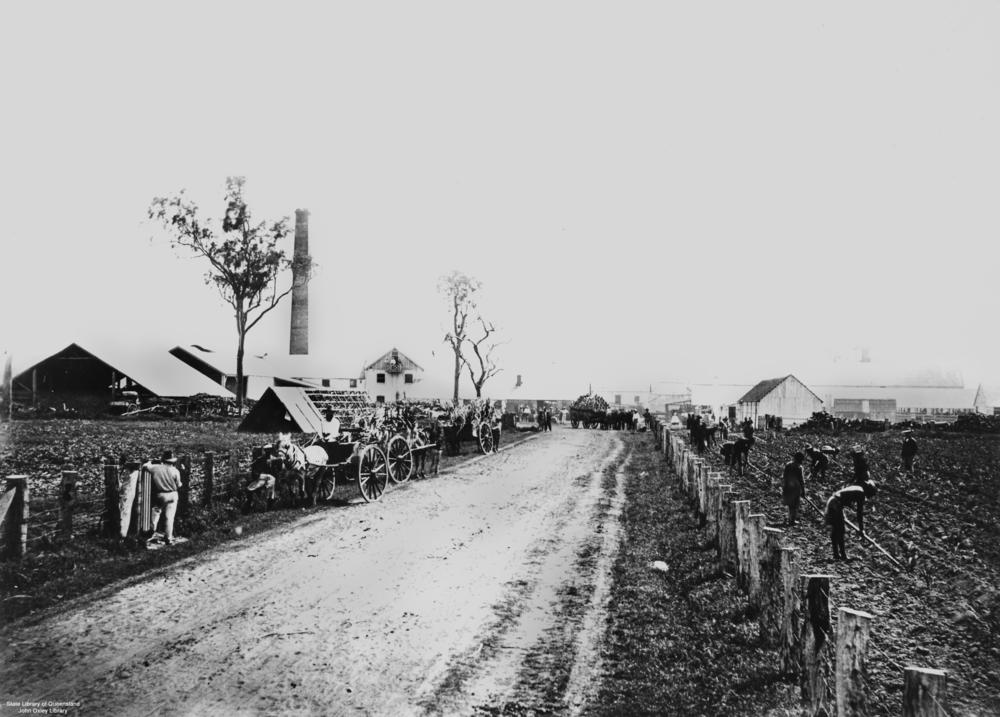
Road through Te Kowai Sugar Mill, circa 1880

The name of the suburb is derived from a former railway station, itself derived from a nearby sugar plantation named after a New Zealand tree, kōwhai. The name was shortened and the Māori definite article "Te" added.

The Te Kowai sugar mill was established in 1874 at 21.16143°S 149.1220°E and operated until 1894 when it amalgamated with the Palms Mill.

Te Kowai State School opened on 13 November 1883 and closed in December 1968. It was at 5 Te Kowai Foulden Road (21.1659°S 149.1273°E).

Constructed on the Mackay railway line, initially from Mackay to Eton, commenced on 14 November 1883 and was completed on 10 August 1885. In Te Kowai it followed the route of the present-day Peak Downs Highway with the Te Kowai railway station at 21.1655°S 149.1207°E. The line closed in 2009.

Te Kowai Presbyterian Church opened on 8 December 1918.

== Demographics ==
In the 2016 census, Te Kowai had a population of 218 people.

In the 2021 census, Te Kowai had a population of 227 people.

== Education ==
There are no schools in Te Kowai. The nearest government primary schools are Dundula State School in neighbouring Bakers Creek to the south-west, Walkerston State School in Walkerston to the west, and Mackay West State School in West Mackay to the north-east. The nearest government secondary school is Mackay State High School in South Mackay to the east.

== Facilities ==
Mackay South Water Recycling Facility (also known as Bakers Creek Water Treatment Plant) is a sewage treatment plant at the western end of Temples Lane (21.2058°S 149.1258°E). Operated by the Mackay Regional Council, the plant processes waste water from 63,000 people. It provides high quality recycled water for irrigation as required by farmers (reducing drawdown of groundwater) with any remaining water being discharged into Bakers Creek. As the water is high in nutrients, it is better for the environment to use it on crops than to add it to the nutrient load of the creek. The sludge that remains after processing is centrifuged to remove remaining water and the solid waste is sold as nutrient-rich compost for farms.

== Weather Station ==
Te Kowai weather station is a weather station at Te Kowai, operated by the Bureau of Meteorology. This weather station does not run on weekends and public holidays.

Month	Jan	Feb	Mar	Apr	May	Jun	Jul	Aug	Sep	Oct	Nov	Dec	Year
Average max. temperature °C	30.9	30.4	29.5	27.9	25.7	23.7	23.4	24.6	26.8	29.0	30.3	31.3	27.8
Average min. temperature °C	21.9	21.9	20.7	18.1	14.7	11.6	10.1	10.8	13.4	16.6	19.2	20.8	16.6
Rainfall mm	341.3	346.5	277.5	144.3	92.3	61.3	36.0	30.0	28.2	45.6	83.2	180.0	1666.8
Source: Bureau of Meteorology
