= Foulden, Queensland =

Foulden
- Suburb
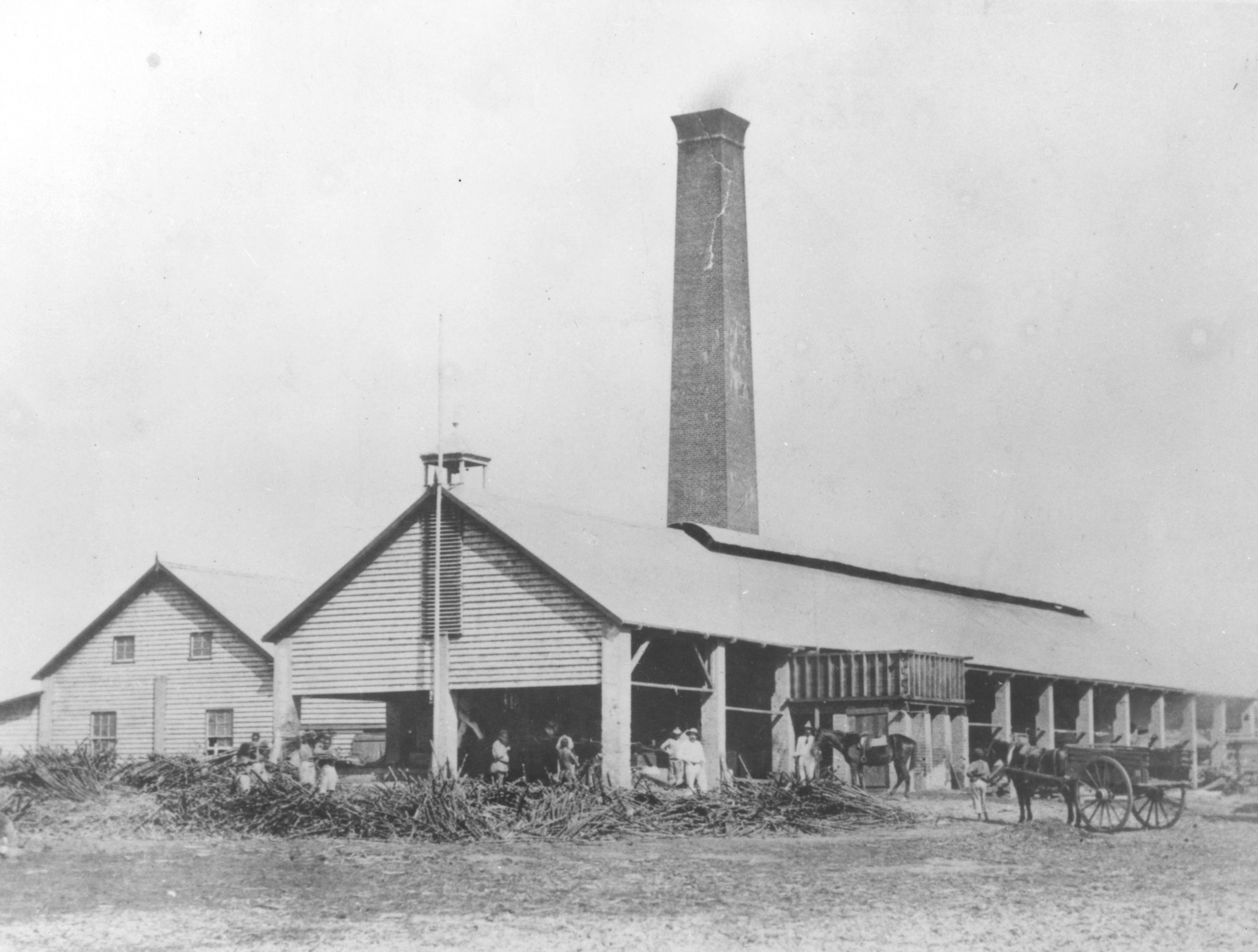
- Foulden sugar mill, circa 1880

- Interactive map of Foulden
- Coordinates: 21.1397°S 149.1469°E
- Country: Australia
- State: Queensland
- City: Mackay
- LGA: Mackay Region
- Location: 5.7 km (3.5 mi) W of Mackay CBD; 975 km (606 mi) NNW of Brisbane

Government
  - State electorates: Mackay; Whitsunday
  - Federal division: Dawson

Area
  - Total: 3.2 km^{2} (1.2 sq mi)

Population
  - Total: 0 (2021 census)
  - Density: 0.00/km^{2} (0.0/sq mi)
- Time zone: UTC+10:00 (AEST)
- Postcode: 4740
Suburbs around Foulden
Erakala	Glenella	Mount Pleasant
Erakala	Foulden	West Mackay
Te Kowai	Racecourse	West Mackay

Foulden is a rural locality in the Mackay Region, Queensland, Australia. It is on the northern bank of the Pioneer River in Mackay. In the 2021 census, Foulden had "no people or a very low population".

== Geography ==
Foulden is bounded by the Pioneer River to the south and east, Fursden Creek to the north, and the Maraju Yakapari Road to the west.

The North Coast railway line enters the locality from the south (crossing over the river from Racecourse / West Mackay on a dedicated rail bridge) and exits to the north (Erakala). The locality was served by the former Maraju railway station (21.1402°S 149.1496°E).

The Glenella Connection Road enters through the locality from south (crossing over the river from West Mackay on the Edmund Casey Bridge) and exits to the north (Eralaka / Glenella).

The land is low lying and flat and prone to flooding, but well-suited to growing sugarcane which is the predominant land use.

== History ==
Foulden Sugar Mill operated from 1872 to 1887. It was on the northern bank of the Pioneer River.

There was previously a bridge, known as the (Old) Hospital Bridge, which connected Talty Road in Foulden to Bridge Street in West Mackay (adjacent to the Mackay Base Hospital). It was the first bridge over the Pioneer River (and was originally known as the Pioneer Bridge). Construction commenced in 1875. The low bridge was prone to flooding. In April 2009, its replacement was open to the west of the Hospital Bridge carrying the newly constructed Glenella Connection Road over the Pioneer River. On 5 December 2009, the new bridge was named the Edmund Casey Bridge in honour of long-serving local Member of the Queensland Legislative Assembly, Ed Casey, as part of the Q150 celebrations. Local residents campaigned to retain the Old Hospital Bridge for recreational use such as walking, cycling and fishing, but the council insisted the costs of making it safe were too great and that only a short segment connected on the West Mackay side would be preserved as a fishing pier. However, in March 2017, Cyclone Debbie damaged the fishing pier, necessitating a new fishing pier to be built. The new pier will be L-shaped and more resistant to flood damage.

The present-day locality was officially named and bounded on 3 September 1999.

== Demographics ==
In the 2016 census, Foulden had a population of 3 people.

In the 2021 census, Foulden had "no people or a very low population".

== Education ==
There are no schools in Foulden. The nearest government primary school is Glenella State School in neighbouring Glenella to the north. The nearest government secondary school is Mackay North State High School in North Mackay to the north-east and Mackay State High School in South Mackay to the south-east.
