= Racecourse, Queensland =

Racecourse
- Suburb
- Interactive map of Racecourse
- Coordinates: 21.1575°S 149.14°E
- Country: Australia
- State: Queensland
- City: Mackay
- LGA: Mackay Region
- Location: 6.5 km (4.0 mi) WSW of Mackay CBD; 6.7 km (4.2 mi) W of South Mackay; 949 km (590 mi) NNW of Brisbane

Government
  - State electorate: Mirani
  - Federal division: Capricornia

Area
  - Total: 8.4 km^{2} (3.2 sq mi)

Population
  - Total: 181 (2021 census)
  - Density: 21.55/km^{2} (55.8/sq mi)
- Time zone: UTC+10:00 (AEST)
- Postcode: 4740
Suburbs around Racecourse
Erakala	Foulden	Foulden
Te Kowai	Racecourse	West Mackay
Te Kowai	Te Kowai	Paget; Ooralea; Bakers Creek

Racecourse is a western suburb of Mackay in the Mackay Region, Queensland, Australia. In the 2021 census, Racecourse had a population of 181 people.

== Geography ==
The northern boundary follows a small section of the Pioneer River while most of the eastern boundary is aligned with the North Coast railway line.

Most of the land in Racecourse is used for the cultivation of sugar cane. The cane is transported via a network of cane tramways through the district and refined at the local Racecourse Sugar Mill (21.1631°S 149.1346°E).

== History ==
The suburb takes its name from the Mackay Racecourse established by the Mackay Turf Club in 1867 on the south-west corner of the Peak Downs Highway and Broadsound Road / Bruce Highway, which is now within present boundaries of the suburb of Ooralea and has been renamed Ooralea Racecourse.

== Demographics ==
In the 2011 census, Racecourse had a population of 242 people.

In the 2016 census, Racecourse had a population of 184 people.

In the 2021 census, Racecourse had a population of 181 people.

== Heritage listings ==
Racecourse has a number of heritage-listed places, including:

- Selwyn House, Cowleys Road

== Education ==
There are no schools in Racecourse. The nearest government primary schools are Mackay West State School in neighbouring West Mackay to the east and Dundula State School in neighbouring Bakers Creek to the south-east. The nearest government secondary school is Mackay State High School in South Mackay to the east.

== See also ==
- List of tramways in Queensland
