= West Mackay =

- Suburb
- Interactive map of West Mackay
- Coordinates: 21.1527°S 149.1625°E
- Country: Australia
- State: Queensland
- City: Mackay
- LGA: Mackay Region
- Location: 3.1 km (1.9 mi) SW of Mackay CBD; 333 km (207 mi) NNW of Rockhampton; 387 km (240 mi) SE of Townsville; 1,228 km (763 mi) NNW of Brisbane

Government
  - State electorate: Mackay
  - Federal division: Dawson

Area
  - Total: 6.5 km^{2} (2.5 sq mi)

Population
  - Total: 6,536 (2021 census)
  - Density: 1,006/km^{2} (2,604/sq mi)
- Time zone: UTC+10:00 (AEST)
- Postcode: 4740
Suburbs around West Mackay
Foulden	Mount Pleasant	North Mackay
Racecourse	West Mackay	Mackay
Ooralea	Paget	South Mackay

West Mackay is a suburb of Mackay in the Mackay Region, Queensland, Australia. In the 2021 census, West Mackay had a population of 6,536 people.

== Geography ==
West Mackay is (as the name suggests) west of the Mackay central business district. Having a diamond-like shape, it is bounded by the Pioneer River to the north-west, the Bruce Highway to the north-east, and Paradise Street to the south-east.

The North Coast railway line enters the suburb from the south (Paget), then forms part of the suburb's south-western boundary before it crosses the Pioneer River to Foulden.

The Glenella Connection Road pass through the locality from south to north-west crossing the river on the Edmund Casey Bridge to Foulden. Another major road transport route through the suburb is the Nebo Road.

The land is low lying and flat.

The Mackay Base Hospital is located on Hospital Road beside the Pioneer River. The Mackay Botanic Gardens are located off Lagoon Street and features a natural lagoon.

== History ==
The (Old) Hospital Bridge was the first bridge over the Pioneer River (and was originally known as the Pioneer Bridge). Construction commenced in 1875. It connected Talty Road in Foulden to Bridge Street in West Mackay (adjacent to the Mackay Base Hospital). It was a low-level bridge and prone to flooding.

The North Coast railway opened to Mackay in 1885. The West Mackay area was served by Mackay West railway station off Hume Street (21.1461°S 149.1623°E). In the 1990s, the rail bridge over the Pioneer River needed to be replaced, which presented an opportunity for re-alignment of the railway line to bypass the Mackay CBD. In 1994, the new alignment opened and a number of stations on the closed section of the line, including the Mackay West railway station were no longer required and were dismantled.

Mackay Bowls Club opened in 1906, the first bowling club in Mackay.

South Ward State School opened on 11 February 1924. In 1938, it was renamed Mackay West State School. In 1950, a new site in Bridge Street was allocated to the school which was 10 acres 2 roods (4.2 ha).

St Francis Xavier Catholic Primary School was established by the Sisters of Mercy on 4 February 1935 with 23 students. In 1958, they purchased the Anglican church opposite to establish an infants school.

Mackay West Infants State School separated from Mackay West State School on 31 January 1956. It merged back into Mackay West State School on 1 July 1994. It was located at 364 Bridge Road (21.1517°S 149.1643°E).

In April 2009, a new bridge was opened to the west of the Hospital Bridge carrying the newly constructed Glenella Connection Road over the Pioneer River. On 5 December 2009, the new bridge was named the Edmund Casey Bridge in honour of long-serving local Member of the Queensland Legislative Assembly, Ed Casey, as part of the Q150 celebrations. Local residents campaigned to retain the Old Hospital Bridge for recreational use such as walking, cycling and fishing, but the council insisted the costs of making it safe were too great and that only a short segment connected on the West Mackay side would be preserved as a fishing pier. However, in March 2017, Cyclone Debbie damaged the fishing pier, necessitating a new fishing pier to be built. The new pier will be L-shaped and more resistant to flood damage.

The Sugar Research Institute was built in 1953, but relocated to Brisbane in 2006. The institute buildings were used as commercial offices until 2016 when the Roman Catholic Diocese of Rockhampton purchased the site to establish a new secondary school, Catherine McAuley College Mackay. The school opened to its first Year 7 students in 2022 and by 2027 will be offering Years 7-12 secondary schooling.

== Demographics ==
In the 2011 census, West Mackay had a population of 6,507 people.

In the 2016 census, West Mackay had a population of 6,210 people. West Mackay had the largest Maltese Australian community of any suburb in Queensland, numbering 243 individuals and making up 3.9% of the suburb's population.

In the 2021 census, West Mackay had a population of 6,536 people.

== Heritage listings ==
West Mackay has a number of heritage-listed places, including:

- Mackay General Cemetery, Cemetery Road (21.145°S 149.1642°E)
- Sugar Research Institute, 239 Nebo Road (21.1618°S 149.1594°E)

== Education ==
Mackay West State School is a government primary (Prep–6) school for boys and girls at Pinder Street (21.1525°S 149.1613°E). In 2018, the school had an enrolment of 677 students with 50 teachers (48 full-time equivalent) and 32 non-teaching staff (21 full-time equivalent). It includes a special education program.

St Francis Xavier Catholic Primary School is a Catholic primary (Prep–6) school for boys and girls at Mackenzie Street (21.1503°S 149.1603°E). In 2018, the school had an enrolment of 526 students with 31 teachers (27 full-time equivalent) and 20 non-teaching staff (13 full-time equivalent).

Catherine McAuley College Mackay is a Catholic secondary (Years 7–12) school for boys and girls at 239 Nebo Road (21.1618°S 149.1594°E). The school opened to its first 110 Year 7 students in 2022 with 14 teachers (13.51 full-time equivalent) and 11 non-teaching staff (8.68 full-time equivalent). By 2027, the school expects to offer a full secondary program with an expected 1200 students.

There are no government secondary schools in West Mackay. The nearest government secondary school is Mackay State High School in neighbouring South Mackay to the south-west.

James Cook University has a clinical school at the Mackay Base Hospital (21.1475°S 149.1549°E).

== Facilities ==
Mackay Base Hospital is at 475 Bridge Road (21.1469°S 149.1549°E).

Mackay Cemetery is a monumental cemetery on Cemetery Road (21.1448°S 149.1643°E). It is operated by the Mackay Regional Council.

Nebo Road Water Treatment Plant is a potable water treatment plant at 218 Nebo Road (21.1603°S 149.1597°E). It is operated by the Mackay Regional Council and is their largest water treatment plant. It draws water from the Dumbleton Weir on the Pioneer River and from groundwater bores and can produce up to 75 megalitres (2.6×10^{6} cu ft) per day of drinking water.

Mackay Power Station is a gas-fired power station at 8A Hume Street (21.1446°S 149.1589°E).

== Amenities ==
Parkside Plaza is a shopping centre at 245 Bridge Road (corner Paradise Street, 21.1582°S 149.16933°E). It is anchored by a Coles supermarket.

Mackay Botanic Gardens are at 9 Lagoon Street (21.1582°S 149.1594°E). It showcases plants of the Central Queensland area. It is operated by the Mackay Regional Council. At the entrance to the Gardens, there is an art gallery, cafe and meeting room.

The South Sea Islander Meeting Hut is a community centre at 12 Ram Chandra Place (21.1634°S 149.1551°E).

There are a number of churches in the suburb:

- St Charles Anglican Church, 37 McGinn Street (21.1582°S 149.1629°E)
- St Francis Xavier's Memorial Catholic Church, 56 Holland Street (21.1503°S 149.1613°E)
- Iona West Uniting Church, 7 Brooks Street (21.1538°S 149.1634°E)
- Mackay Family Church of the Nazarene, 31 Field Street (21.1524°S 149.1709°E)
- Mackay Christian Assembly, 25 Hume Street (21.1497°S 149.1570°E)

Mackay Bowls Club is at 28 Nebo Road (21.1491°S 149.1718°E).

There are a number of parks in the area:

- Marryatt Street Park (21.1469°S 149.1680°E)
- Paget Street Park (21.1667°S 149.1616°E)
- Rotary Park (21.1500°S 149.1657°E)

== Attractions ==
Mackay Visitor Information Centre is at 316 Nebo Road (21.1653°S 149.1543°E).
