= Mater Misericordiae Hospital =

Mater Misericordiae Hospital may refer to:

== Australia ==
- Mater Misericordiae Hospital, Brisbane
- Mater Misericordiae Hospital, Bundaberg
- Mater Misericordiae Hospital, Mackay
- Mater Misericordiae Hospital, Rockhampton
- Mater Misericordiae Hospital, Townsville
- Mater Hospital, North Sydney (formerly the Mater Misericordiae Hospital, North Sydney)

== Ireland ==
- Mater Misericordiae University Hospital, Dublin

== New Zealand ==
- Mater Misericordiae Hospital, Dunedin, now Mercy Hospital
- Mater Misericordiae Hospital, Auckland, now Allevia Hospital Epsom
