= East Mackay, Queensland =

East Mackay
- Suburb
- Interactive map of East Mackay
- Coordinates: 21.15°S 149.1997°E
- Country: Australia
- State: Queensland
- City: Mackay
- LGA: Mackay Region
- Location: 1.9 km (1.2 mi) SE of Mackay CBD; 951 km (591 mi) NNW of Brisbane

Government
  - State electorate: Mackay
  - Federal division: Dawson

Area
  - Total: 3.3 km^{2} (1.3 sq mi)

Population
  - Total: 3,725 (2021 census)
  - Density: 1,129/km^{2} (2,920/sq mi)
- Time zone: UTC+10:00 (AEST)
- Postcode: 4740
Suburbs around East Mackay
Mackay	Cremorne	Cremorne
Mackay	East Mackay	Coral Sea
South Mackay	South Mackay	Coral Sea

East Mackay is a coastal suburb of Mackay in the Mackay Region, Queensland, Australia. In the 2021 census, East Mackay had a population of 3,725 people.

== Geography ==
As the name suggests, East Mackay is the suburb to the east of the city centre. It is flat low-lying coastal land (less than 10 metres above sea level). It is bounded by the Pioneer River to the north and the Coral Sea to the east. There is a sandy beach along the foreshore to the sea known as Town Beach.

East Mackay has the following sandy beaches:

- Iluka Beach (Town Beach) (21.1515°S 149.2056°E)
- Illawong Beach (Far Beach) (21.1697°S 149.1963°E) which extends into South Mackay and Paget

It is possible to swim at the beaches at high tide, but, as the tide goes out, extensive mudflats are revealed.

The suburb is mostly used for residential purposes except for the northern part of the suburb at the mouth of the Pioneer River, which is a wetland known as the Sandfly Creek Environmental Reserve and managed by the Mackay Regional Council. The wetland serves a number of purposes, acting as a levee against coastal erosion, providing a habitat for shorebirds and other fauna, and providing a walking track for visitors.

== History ==
Victoria Park State School opened on 1 July 1926. On 27 January 1970, the school was divided to create a separate Victoria Park State Infants School for the early years of schooling, but on 16 December 1994 the infants school was merged back into the main school. The infants school was at 43-47 Skakespeare Street (the triangular block enclosed by Shakespeare Street, Hague Street and Macrossan Street, 21.1493°S 149.1974°E).

== Demographics ==
In the 2016 census, East Mackay had a population of 3,564 people.

In the 2021 census, East Mackay had a population of 3,725 people.

== Education ==
Victoria Park State School is a government primary (Early Childhood to Year 6) school for boys and girls at 15 Goldsmith Street (21.1477°S 149.1939°E). In 2016, the school had an enrolment of 612 students with 48 teachers (45 full-time equivalent) and 36 non-teaching staff (23 full-time equivalent). In 2018, the school had an enrolment of 643 students with 51 teachers (47 full-time equivalent) and 43 non-teaching staff (27 full-time equivalent). It includes a special education program.

Mackay Positive Learning Centre is a specific-purpose primary and secondary (6–12) school at Shakespeare Street (21.1486°S 149.1947°E). The role of Positive Learning Centres is to re-engage with school-age children who need intervention to enable them to return to conventional schooling or to transition into vocational training.

There are no government secondary schools in East Mackay. The nearest government secondary school is Mackay State High School in neighbouring South Mackay to the south-east.

== Amenities ==
The Bluewater Trail which connects a number of popular recreation areas passes through East Mackay roughly following the riverside and coastline.

Queens Park at Goldsmith Street has a number of amenities including an orchid house, a band rotunda, a cricket pitch, picnic tables and playgrounds. A number of areas in the park can be hired for weddings.
