= Foulden =

Several places share the name Foulden:

== Australia ==
- Foulden, Queensland, a locality in the Mackay Region

== New Zealand ==
- Foulden Maar, a geological formation in Otago, New Zealand

== United Kingdom ==
- Foulden, Norfolk, England
- Foulden, Scottish Borders, Scotland
