= Bakers Creek, Queensland =

Bakers Creek
- Town
- Interactive map of Bakers Creek
- Coordinates: 21.2203°S 149.1466°E
- Country: Australia
- State: Queensland
- LGA: Mackay Region
- Location: 9.3 km (5.8 mi) SSW of Mackay CBD; 971 km (603 mi) NNW of Brisbane

Government
  - State electorate: Mirani
  - Federal division: Capricornia

Area
  - Total: 20.6 km^{2} (8.0 sq mi)

Population
  - Total: 1,590 (2021 census)
  - Density: 77.2/km^{2} (199.9/sq mi)
- Time zone: UTC+10:00 (AEST)
- Postcode: 4740
Localities around Bakers Creek
Racecourse	Ooralea	Paget
Te Kowai	Bakers Creek	Coral Sea
Sandiford	Rosella	McEwens Beach

Bakers Creek is a rural town and coastal locality in the Mackay Region, Queensland, Australia. In the 2021 census, the locality of Bakers Creek had a population of 1,590 people.

== Geography ==
Bakers Creek is located 8 kilometres (5.0 mi) south of Mackay. The Bruce Highway and the North Coast railway line traverse the locality from south to north, passing the town which is served by the Bakers Creek railway station with a second railway station Dundula in the north of the locality. The Dundula railway station was named on 30 October 1913 by J. Strachan, the Mackay railway traffic manager of the Queensland Railways Department as an Aboriginal word meaning eucalypt tree. In turn, the surrounding neighbourhood and also the school are named Dundula.

The land in Bakers Creek is flat and low-lying (under 10 metres above sea level) and is well-watered by the watercourse Bakers Creek which flows into the Coral Sea. To the north of mouth of the creek is the Bakers Creek Conservation Park.

The land is predominantly used for growing sugarcane and there is a network of cane tramways to deliver the harvested sugarcane to the local sugar mills.

== History ==
The locality was named after the creek, which in turn was named after John I. Baker, a customs officer in Mackay in 1863.

Dundula State School opened on 28 August 1922 with 37 children enrolled on the first day, with 45 enrolled by the end of 1922. The first headmaster was Courtney Hoffman.

Bakers Creek Post Office opened on 1 July 1927 (a receiving office had been open since 1909) and closed in 1979.

In 1943, a USAAF aircraft crashed in the locality, killing 40 of the 41 people on board. The Bakers Creek air crash is Australia's worst aviation disaster by death toll. A memorial to the disaster was built in 1981 and is located in the grounds of the Bakers Creek Community Hall.

In 1964, the Queensland Government built a meatworks. In 1978, it was sold to Thomas Borthwick & Sons who enlarged the facility. It was purchased by NH Foods in 1994 but continues to trade as Thomas Borthwick & Sons.

== Demographics ==
In the 2006 census, the town of Bakers Creek had a population of 770 people.

In the 2016 census, the locality of Bakers Creek had a population of 1,161 people.

In the 2021 census, the locality of Bakers Creek had a population of 1,590 people.

== Economy ==
The main industry is a large meat processing plant operated by Thomas Borthwick & Sons (Aust) Pty Ltd, a subsidiary of NH Foods. Cattle are obtained from the Central Highlands and Coalfields through to the Atherton Tablelands, North Western Districts onto the Gulf of Carpentaria. The plants supplies the domestic market as well as export markets including Chin Europe Union, Japan, the Middle East, and the United States of America. The plant is certified to produce halal meat.

== Education ==
Dundula State School is a government primary (Prep-6) school for boys and girls at 1 Main Street (21.2016°S 149.1487°E). In 2016, the school had an enrolment of 48 students with 4 teachers (3 full-time equivalent) and 8 non-teaching staff (3 full-time equivalent). In 2018, the school had an enrolment of 68 students with 5 teachers (4 full-time equivalent) and 10 non-teaching staff (5 full-time equivalent).

There are no secondary schools in Bakers Creek. The nearest government secondary school is Mackay State High School in South Mackay to the north.
