= Ooralea, Queensland =

Ooralea
- Suburb
- Interactive map of Ooralea
- Coordinates: 21.1783°S 149.1433°E
- Country: Australia
- State: Queensland
- City: Mackay
- LGA: Mackay Region
- Location: 6.4 km (4.0 mi) SW of Mackay CBD; 331 km (206 mi) NNW of Rockhampton; 388 km (241 mi) SE of Townsville; 945 km (587 mi) NNW of Brisbane

Government
  - State electorate: Mirani
  - Federal division: Capricornia

Area
  - Total: 5.5 km^{2} (2.1 sq mi)

Population
  - Total: 3,691 (2021 census)
  - Density: 671/km^{2} (1,738/sq mi)
- Time zone: UTC+10:00 (AEST)
- Postcode: 4740
Suburbs around Ooralea
Racecourse	Racecourse	West Mackay
Racecourse	Ooralea	Paget
Te Kowai	Bakers Creek	Bakers Creek

Ooralea is a southern suburb of Mackay in the Mackay Region, Queensland, Australia. In the 2021 census, Ooralea had a population of 3,691 people.

== Geography ==
Ooralea is an outer suburb of Mackay. The Peak Downs Highway bounds the suburb to the north and the Bruce Highway bounds the suburb to the east.

Although a suburb, Ooralea is only partially used for residential housing with the rest still used for farming sugarcane. The Mackay Regional Council anticipates further suburban development in this suburb.

The Mackay Harness Racing Club operates the Ooralea Racecourse in the north-east corner of the suburb (21.1679°S 149.1502°E). A number of streets near the racecourse are named for champion thoroughbreds such as Makybe Diva Drive, Phar Lap Parade, Gunsynd Street and Bernborough Avenue.

Central Queensland University operates its Mackay campus at Ooralea bounded by Boundary Road and University Drive (21.1765°S 149.1421°E).

== History ==
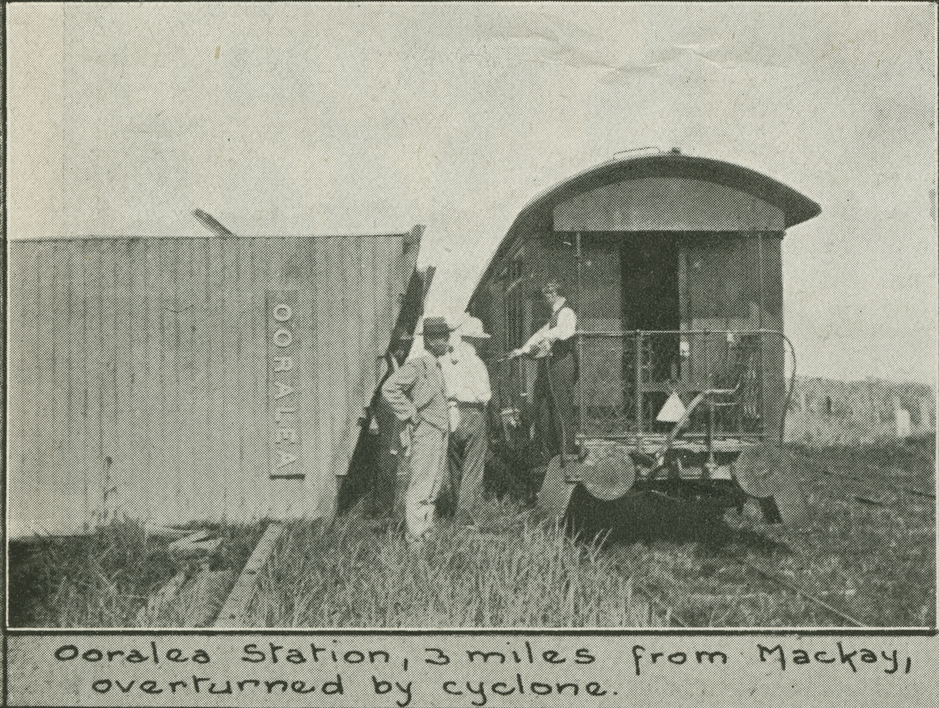
Ooralea railway station overturned by the 1918 Mackay cyclone

Ooralea was originally known as Planlands after the Planlands railway station on the now defunct Mackay railway line which ran parallel to the Peak Downs Highway. The railway station was opposite the race track (21.1661°S 149.1483°E); it no longer exists.

The Ooralea railway station was named by J. Strachan, the Mackay railway traffic manager in the Queensland Railways Department.

== Demographics ==
In the 2016 census, Ooralea had a population of 3,366 people.

In the 2021 census, Ooralea had a population of 3,691 people.

== Education ==
There are no schools in Ooralea. The nearest government primary schools are Mackay West State School in neighbouring West Mackay to the north-east and Dundula State School in neighbouring Bakers Creek to the south. The nearest government secondary school is Mackay State High School in South Mackay to the north-east.

== Amenities ==
There are a number of parks in the area:

- Bernborough Avenue Park (21.1693°S 149.1437°E)
- Bradco Ave Park (21.1796°S 149.1439°E)
- Dickens Ave Park (21.1775°S 149.1473°E)
- Downing Street Park (21.1756°S 149.1459°E)
- George Moore Park (21.1685°S 149.1466°E)
