= Mackay General Cemetery =

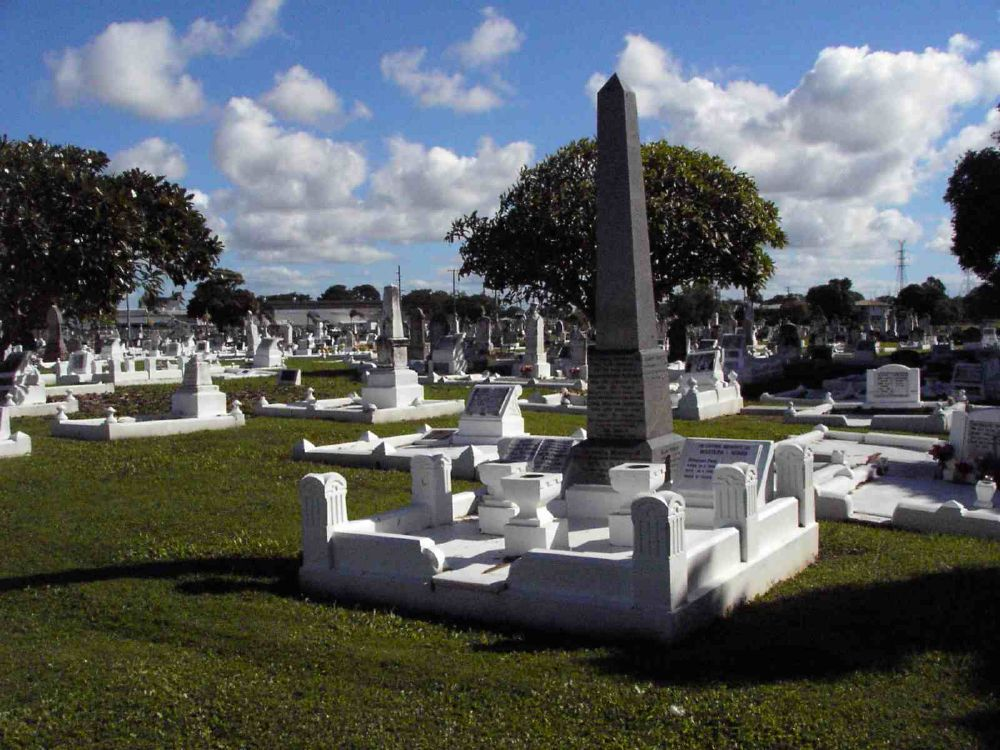
- Mackay General Cemetery

- Location within Queensland Location within Australia
- 21.145°S 149.164°E
- Location: Cemetery Road, West Mackay, Mackay Region, Queensland, Australia

History
- Design period: 1840s–1860s (mid-19th century)
- Built: 1865 onwards

Site notes
- Architect: Thomas Henry Fitzgerald

Queensland Heritage Register
- Official name: Mackay General Cemetery
- Type: state heritage (built, landscape)
- Designated: 19 November 2010
- Reference no.: 602766
- Significant period: 1865–1990s

Mackay General Cemetery is a heritage-listed cemetery at Cemetery Road, West Mackay, Mackay Region, Queensland, Australia. It was designed by Thomas Henry Fitzgerald and built in 1865 onwards. It was added to the Queensland Heritage Register on 19 November 2010.

== History ==
The Mackay General Cemetery was the Mackay region's principal cemetery and is one of the earliest regional cemeteries in Queensland. Its site was surveyed by licensed surveyor and Mackay identity Thomas Henry Fitzgerald (owner of the Alexandra sugar plantation) in late 1865. Closed to new burials in the 1990s, it is the burial place of about 15,500 people.

The cemetery was surveyed soon after the township of Mackay was established on the banks of the Pioneer River. The first town allotments were sold in 1863 about two years after the Pioneer Valley began to be settled by pastoralists. Fitzgerald considered that the cemetery site was suitable because, as he stated, it was:

"nearly a mile from the town boundary. The greater portion of it is quite dry and comprised of rich black soil in which it will be very easy to dig graves."

The earliest documented burial in the cemetery occurred in July 1866. The Mackay deaths register, in which that burial is recorded, notes two earlier burials (October 1864 and June 1865) there. It is possible that these occurred at the Mackay General Cemetery before it was officially surveyed; however, it is more likely that they took place at one of the cemeteries that ceased to be used after the General Cemetery was opened. Mackay General Cemetery is one of the earliest major cemeteries in the region, being contemporary to South Rockhampton Cemetery (1860) and West End Cemetery at Townsville (1865).

From the 1870s, the cemetery was divided into sections according to religious denomination and included an "alien section" (for those with other beliefs). This typical feature of cemeteries established in late Victorian times was a vestige of the control formerly by the Church of England (now known as the Anglican Church) over burials which originally took place in churchyards. Initially in Australia, the Anglican Church had control of public cemeteries. This situation was disputed by other denominations and began to change from the 1820s with the establishment of denominational areas within cemeteries. Then, from the 1840s, culminating in the Queensland Cemeteries Act 1865, government legislated for the transfer of responsibility for administration of cemeteries from the church to an appointed board of trustees. Typically, cemeteries established from the late 20th century have not retained denominational divisions.

The Mackay Cemetery Trust was appointed in 1870 and on 4 April 1873 the rules and regulations for the Mackay Cemetery were gazetted. The first trustees were local luminaries Thomas Henry Fitzgerald, John Spiller (Pioneer Plantation), David Hay Dalrymple (Mayor of Mackay), George Smith and William McBryde (Secretary). The cemetery continued to operate under a board of trustees until 1934 when legislation was introduced that handed the control of cemeteries to the local authorities.

The general layout of the cemetery began to take shape from 1877 when tenders were called for cemetery roads; the present main road into the shelter shed dates to 1882. The camphor laurels (Cinnamomum camphora) that line the main central road date to 1899. Fences, lych-gate, mortuary chapel and iron gates were also erected in the late 19th century, but none of these are extant. Buildings in the cemetery including the tool shed and shelter shed date from the late 20th century.

The layout of the Mackay General Cemetery is typical of that employed in late Victorian cemeteries both in Australia and Britain, which were strongly influenced by the principles of the cemetery design movement encapsulated in the book by horticultural journalist, author and landscape architect, John Claudius Loudon, On the laying out, planting and managing of cemeteries (1843). Above all Loudon recommended a practical approach to cemetery design that was responsive to the nature of the selected site; so on level sites formal layouts of orthogonal grave rows, walks and drives were employed, while on hilly sites broad sweeps were used to ease gradients. Other standard features included a central carriageway lined by evergreen trees, as were other paths in preference to groupings of trees, leading to a focal structure in the centre of the cemetery, use of plant species with some symbolism related to death or mourning, and a grid pattern of graves accessible by paths or roadways. The aesthetic qualities of these layouts represented a shift in the preferred balance of formal and informal elements within the cemetery landscape towards an increased degree of formality and often symmetry, which had a practical advantage in being easier and less expensive to lay out.

The wide variety of elaborate monuments was also a feature of late Victorian cemeteries and reflected popular taste at the time. From the interwar period the trend was towards simpler more economical monuments and away from curbing and fenced plots. This trend culminated in the development of low maintenance lawn cemeteries after World War II with plaques set close to, or flush with the ground. An exception to this trend was the reappearance, towards the end of the 20th century, of more elaborate monuments associated with some ethnic populations.

The variety of monuments and inscriptions reflects the changing demography of the Mackay region from its earliest days until the closure of the cemetery in the 1990s. A range of ethnic and cultural groups came to Mackay to work in the region's main industry: sugar cane growing and processing.

Sugar cane was introduced to the Mackay area in 1863 and soon developed into a major industry. By 1872 Mackay mills produced 40 per cent of the total Queensland sugar production and 37 per cent of its rum. Heavy regulation of the sugar industry from 1915 ensured the prosperity of the region. It has become one of Queensland's main sugar cane growing areas and produces about a third of the sugar in Queensland. The state produces most of the nation's sugar.

South Sea Islanders were the earliest and most numerous of the ethnic groups who came to the region to work in the sugar industry. First brought to the Mackay area to provide cheap manual labour in the 1860s, they remained a major presence until the trade in Islander labour ceased in 1904. Mackay hosted the largest population of South Sea Islanders in Australia.

Other ethnic groups employed in the sugar industry included Javanese (from the 1880s), Singhalese (Sri Lankans) (from the 1880s), Japanese, and Southern Europeans, notably Maltese (from 1912) and Italians. Over 1000 Japanese migrated to Australia between 1888 and 1901 to work in the sugar cane industry; for a short time in the 1890s a Japanese consular official was established in Townsville. Chinese and Indians were also a presence, as in most other places in north Queensland.

The cemetery contains South Sea Islander, Japanese, Javanese (Muslim) and Singhalese graves. The Japanese graves date to the early 20th century. South Sea Islander graves in the cemetery include that of Kwailiu Fatana'ona (John Fatnahoona), who was recruited from Malaita in the Solomon Islands to work in the cane fields of the Mackay district and was buried in 1904 aged 40 years. The Muslim graves include a slab design finished with decorative tiles in a manner that is typically Indonesian. There are also Italian and Maltese graves. For some of these ethnic groups, particularly the Japanese and Javanese, graves are the only extant physical evidence of their presence in the Mackay region between the late 19th and early 20th century.

The cemetery also contains a number of graves of early identities in the region. The graves of people associated with the establishment of the sugar industry include plantation and mill owners, Gustav Muller of Hilldale, Charles Walker of the Dumbleton Plantation, Charles King of Meadowlands Plantation and Mill, William Williams of the Lorne Plantation, and James Carey of the Racecourse Mill.

Other notable burials include monuments for: Andrew Diehm who accompanied the explorer William Landsborough on his explorations of the Burdekin and Bowen area; Houston Stewart Dalrymple Hay, the Harbour Master and Pilot for Mackay in the 1870s for whom Dalrymple Bay and Hay Point are named; and former mayors of Mackay including Henry Black (after whom Blacks Beach is named) who held the office three times. Many of the district's early clergy are buried in the cemetery including Mackay's first Catholic priest, Father Pierre-Marie Bucas (after whom Bucasia was named).

In the early 1950s the Pioneer Shire Council decided to close the Mackay General Cemetery and to open a new cemetery in Brickworks Court, Glenella, on the north side of the Pioneer River. The first burial at the new cemetery took place on 11 September 1951. Following subsequent burials it was discovered that the soil at the Glenella was not suitable for burials and the council decided to re-open the Mackay General Cemetery for a further two years. The last burial took place at Glenella on 17 June 1952. In 1953 the Council exhumed more than 60 bodies from it and re-interred them in the Mackay General Cemetery.

In the 1990s it was decided that no further plots would be sold in the Mackay General Cemetery. Walkerston to the south-west of Mackay remains open for those who wish to bury their deceased loved ones and to erect burial vaults; otherwise the Mount Bassett Lawn Cemetery, opened in 1953, has replaced the Mackay General Cemetery.

== Description ==
The Mackay General Cemetery is an 8.9 hectares (22 acres) reserve, located west of the inner city area of Mackay at the far western end of Shakespeare Street. It is bounded by Hume Street to the west, Cemetery Road to the south, Holland Street to the east, and to the north by cane fields that extend to the Pioneer River. The part of the reserve determined to be of cultural heritage significance is that used for burials, excluding the north-west corner where crops are being grown and there are no burials. The site is largely flat apart from a gully near the western end that contains a drain way. The main entrance is from Holland Street, at the intersection with Shakespeare Street. From here a curving central drive runs west through the centre of the cemetery, lined with trees on one side. The edges of the cemetery are unfenced; however rows of trees line the footpaths on the southern and eastern sides. The only buildings on the site are a shelter shed, located adjacent to the central drive in the centre of the cemetery, and some recent sheds.

The cemetery is laid out in a grid and subdivided into denominational sections, with specific areas designated for Church of England/Anglican, Presbyterian, Methodist, Lutheran and Catholic burials. A section for minority and ethnic based religions is located in the far western corner. Newer burial sections are located north of the central drive, while a series of grass roadways run north–south between the denominational sections, linking the central drive with Cemetery Road.

A variety of monuments are found throughout the cemetery, including upright slabs, obelisks, crosses, angels, urns and bibles. They are constructed in a variety of styles and materials and feature a wide range of inscriptions in a number of languages. Headstones are made of marble, sandstone, iron, granite, and concrete. Grave surrounds include iron fencing or lacework but are predominantly concrete. Monuments and grave surrounds in the Protestant sections are generally painted white.

An unusual locally made monument is a memorial to several members of the Cameron family. This elaborate cast iron, classical style aedicule is surmounted by a cross. Other monuments of note include several smaller cast-iron grave markers with iron lacework borders. These rectangular panels have inscriptions in relief, frequently laid out in wavy lines. More recent headstones and graves are less ornate, such as slab and desk variations.

There are a number of Muslim graves in the cemetery. One of these consists of a raised slab clad with ornate ceramic tiles; it has a diamond shaped headstone. Two others each consist of a concrete slab with small, simple upright headstone at each end.

The graveyard population comprises a wide variety of people including returned soldiers, Aboriginal people, South Sea Islanders, Japanese, Javanese, German, Maltese, Italian, French, English, Scottish, Welsh, and Irish immigrants.

The work of a number of monumental masons is represented in the Mackay General Cemetery. The majority of mason-marked graves indicate that most people contracted the firm of Melrose and Fenwick. Other masons represented include J. Hanson of Sydney, J. Petrie & Son of Brisbane and of Townsville, A.L. Petrie of Toowong, F.M. Downes, Bowser Co Ltd., Brett & Nott, A.M. Rappell of Mackay, Jaceurs & Son of Royal Park Melbourne, B. & H. Jennings of Rockhampton, Lowther & Sons, W. Robertson & Co. of Mackay, J. Simmonds of Brisbane, C.M. & C. Mackay Iron Works and F.M. Allan of Rockhampton.

A number of war graves plaques have been placed on the graves of Australian servicemen by the Australian War Graves Commission. The Commonwealth War Graves Commission record two servicemen of World War I and ten of World War II as being buried here.

Plantings throughout the cemetery are largely confined to the perimeter and central drive. An avenue of mature camphor laurels (Cinnamomum camphora) lines the northern side of the central drive. A cluster of other mature trees are found along the Holland Street boundary, north of the main entrance. A few lone trees are also randomly located in some burial sections (such as Methodist section no.1).

The shelter shed has a rectangular hipped roof, clad in corrugated iron and supported by square posts. Decorative arches span between the posts and a solid balustrade runs along the north and south edges with timber bench seating along the inner face.

A wide, grassy gully, with concrete drain at the bottom, separates Methodist section No.3 and Catholic section No.2 near the western end of the cemetery.

Views of farmland are obtained to the north, forming a picturesque backdrop to viewing the cemetery. Other picturesque effects are created by the curving central drive with its avenue of trees.

== Heritage listing ==
Mackay General Cemetery was listed on the Queensland Heritage Register on 19 November 2010 having satisfied the following criteria.

The place is important in demonstrating the evolution or pattern of Queensland's history.

The Mackay General Cemetery is one of the earliest cemeteries established in the Mackay Whitsunday region (1865), and having been in continuous use for more than 140 years until the 1990s when it closed, remains its largest. The cemetery therefore provides important evidence of the history and demography of this key sugar-producing region (one of Queensland's oldest and largest) in particular its cultural and ethnic diversity.

The cemetery contains the graves of people from a range of the ethnic groups employed by the sugar industry through time, including South Sea Islanders, Javanese, Singhalese (Sri Lankans), Japanese, Maltese and Italians. For some of these groups, the graves in this cemetery are the only extant physical evidence of their presence in the Mackay region between the late 19th and early 20th centuries.

The cemetery is also important in demonstrating the evolution of burial practices over this period. The progressive layering, development and diversity of styles of memorialisation within the cemetery document changing attitudes to death and fashions in funerary ornamentation since the 1860s.

The place is important in demonstrating the principal characteristics of a particular class of cultural places.

The chief cemetery of Queensland's oldest and largest sugar-producing region, Mackay General Cemetery is important in demonstrating the principal characteristics of a late 19th century public cemetery in continuous use for more than 140 years. These comprise: its denominational divisions including an alien section intended for non-Christian burials, the layout of graves in a grid divided by paths and roadways, the central carriageway lined by evergreen trees, and the variety of monuments illustrating a range of religious and cultural preferences through time. These key characteristics combine to create an atmosphere of repose and reflection, a quality recognised as important to properly honouring and remembering the dead by many Queenslanders.

The cemetery contains examples of a range of key monumental styles dating from the late 19th century until the 1990s. These include the ornate Cameron monument, made locally from cast iron, and the work of numerous monumental masons from throughout Queensland represented there.
