= Sugar Research Institute =

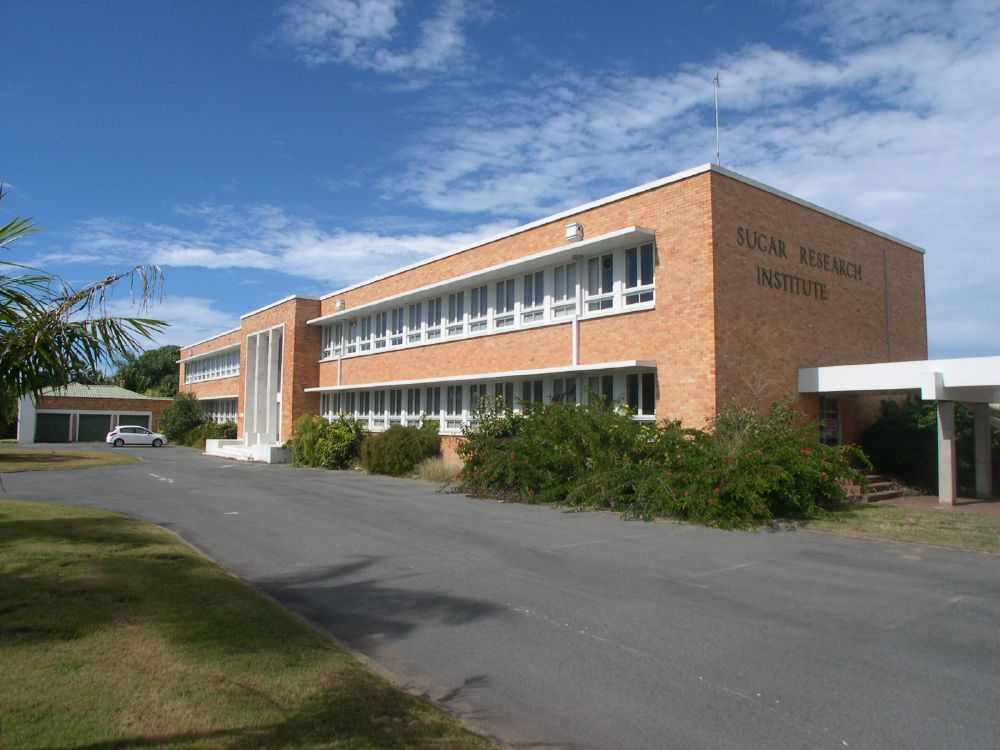
- Sugar Research Institute, 2007

- Location within Queensland Location within Australia
- 21.1618°S 149.1594°E
- Location: 239 Nebo Road, West Mackay, Mackay, Mackay Region, Queensland, Australia

History
- Design period: 1940s–1960s (post-World War II)
- Built: 1953, 1966 & 1973

Site notes
- Architect(s): Karl Langer, Harold Vivian Marsh Brown
- Architectural style: Modernism

Queensland Heritage Register
- Official name: Sugar Research Institute & Residence
- Type: state heritage (built, archaeological)
- Designated: 14 March 2008
- Reference no.: 602642
- Significant period: 1953–2005
- Builders: Don Johnstone

Sugar Research Institute is a heritage-listed former research station at 239 Nebo Road, West Mackay, Mackay, Mackay Region, Queensland, Australia. It was designed by Karl Langer and built in 1953 by Don Johnstone. Harold Vivian Marsh Brown designed a second stage in 1963 that was built in 1966. It was added to the Queensland Heritage Register on 14 March 2008.

== History ==
The Mackay Sugar Research Institute was constructed in 1953 by builder Don Johnstone to a design by prominent architect Karl Langer. Initially, only one section, the eastern wing, was constructed, with the second or western wing opened in August 1966. Mackay architect Harold Brown prepared plans for the second stage of the building in 1963 based on Langer's original design.

=== Background ===
Following the exploration and mapping of pastoral runs in the Mackay district in the early 1860s, the fertile land was soon reduced to smaller selections. It was found that the region was particularly suited to the growing of sugar cane and by 1870 the production of sugar was the region's principal industry. The development of the industry was assisted by the opening of a State Nursery in 1889. Originally built to explore the suitability of diverse forms of agriculture, the "Lagoons" site became the centre for research into cane varieties and more efficient methods of production. Renamed the Mackay Sugar Experiment Station and including laboratories and residences, it was transferred to the Te Kowai mill site in 1935.

The Bureau of Sugar Experiment Stations had been formed in 1900 as part of the Queensland Department of Agriculture and Stock with its work financed by levies on sugar growers and millers, matched by government funding. It co-ordinated the research carried out in the three sugar-growing regions of Mackay, Cairns and Bundaberg comparing cane varieties, sampling soils and fostering better farming and irrigation methods. Millers, represented by the Australian Sugar Producers' Association, became increasingly dissatisfied with their lack of control over the direction and activities of the Bureau. This was somewhat deferred by the formation of the technology branch of the Bureau.

Established in 1929, the Queensland Society of Sugar Cane Technologists held its first conference at Cairns in 1930, convened by Norman Bennett of the Bureau of Sugar Experiment Stations. This was after preliminary meetings of the representatives of 16 sugar mills, six engineering firms and the Central Cane Prices Board. Other absentee mill owners were reputedly uncertain about disclosing trade secrets that such an alliance might bring but the formation of the group was in the face of "stark ruin, with overseas prices on which cheap labour countries could not exist. To some it appeared that the expansion of the previous period had been a mistake..." a situation which was to repeat in years to come. By 1948 both the Queensland Cane Growers' Council and the Australian Sugar Producers' Association were again concerned and angry because the Bureau had lost a string of highly skilled personnel [including two directors], to more highly paid jobs.

In 1949, the Australian sugar industry comprised mainly small cane farms located along the continent's tropical and sub-tropical Queensland and New South Wales coastline. The 5.5 million tonne cane crop, almost entirely grown in Queensland, was crushed by 34 raw sugar mills, most of which were owned co-operatively by growers. The highly regulated sugar industry was still recovering from material and labour shortages caused by World War II and was endeavouring to reassert its position in the world marketplace as a steady, consistent supplier of raw sugar. To achieve this goal, the industry's leaders determined they would have to expand cane production and the factories would have to improve sugar recovery and increase processing rates. The key was a speedy improvement in technological standards. As the government refused to entertain a proposal to place the Bureau of Experiment Stations outside the public service the Sugar Producers' Association formed a committee to draft the constitution for a new sugar industry funded and controlled research institute.

=== Proposal and design ===
Sugar Research Limited was incorporated on 22 February 1949 with 22 companies representing 24 mills as original subscribers, although some smaller mills joined soon thereafter and the Colonial Sugar Refinery provided an annual payment. The inaugural board of Sugar Research Ltd first met in March 1949 with its most pressing tasks being the appointment of a director and establishing a centre for research. George Shaw, a future federal MP, was deputy chairman and a frequent spokesperson.

Dr Henry William (Bill) Kerr, who had joined the Bureau of Sugar Experiment Stations in 1928, progressing to be the director from 1933 to 1943, was appointed the first director of the Sugar Research Institute (1949–61). Kerr was the driving force behind the establishment of the institute and well known in the Australian sugar industry for his important achievements. He developed and implemented soil analytical procedures for the assessment of available phosphorus, potassium and total replaceable bases. He introduced to sugar agriculture a system of replicated experiments, with statistical analysis and interpretation of results. Kerr was a member of the Queensland Society of Sugar Cane Technologists (from 1979 the Australian Society of Sugar Cane Technologists) from its establishment in 1929 until his death in 1992.

The board decided to establish the Sugar Research Institute's central laboratories in Mackay, as an acknowledgement that Mackay in 1949 was both the largest sugar growing district (out of the three main sugar growing areas – Bundaberg, Cairns and Mackay) as well as being the geographical centre of the Australian sugar industry. The board invited Dr Karl Langer to discuss building plans.

Karl Langer was born in Vienna in 1903 where he lived until migrating to Australia in 1939 with his wife Gertrude. Langer studied architecture in Vienna graduating in 1926. During this time he had worked in the office of Josef Frank, who was to become well known in Swedish modernism. In 1933 Langer was awarded a Doctor of Philosophy for his thesis entitled "Origins and Development of Concrete Construction".

At the outbreak of World War II, Langer and Gertrude arrived in Sydney in May 1939 proceeding to Brisbane in July. Langer left employment with Queensland Railways in 1946 to establish his own architectural practice. He worked throughout Australia and was the initiator of many influential urban design ideas such as the site for the Sydney Opera House and the pedestrianisation of Queen Street. He was the designer of buildings such as Main Roads Building, Spring Hill; St Peters Chapel, Indooroopilly; Lennon's Broadbeach Hotel on the Gold Coast, and worked in the regional centres of Queensland as an architect, town planner and landscape architect.

The name Karl Langer is now synonymous with modernist architecture in Queensland and his connection with Mackay predates the building. Langer had been offered the position of assistant town planner in the Brisbane City Council in 1944 but the controversy and publicity surrounding this appointment brought him to the attention of the Mackay City Council which commissioned him to revise that city's town plan.

Langer was also an acquaintance of the secretary of the Sugar Research Institute and was engaged to design the building with offices, boardroom, drawing office and a library and lecture room on the ground floor. The first floor was to house research laboratories. The design provided a single storey utility building, an annexe to the main structure, containing workshops, stores and a machinery room. Later, a second wing could be added to the main building providing additional workshops and laboratory space to cater for expansion of the research institute.

A residence for the director was planned next to the laboratories. According to the original plans for the main building and utilities building the tender for the director's house was described as being "under a separate tender." However this may refer to the construction of the building being under a separate tender rather than its design which is also attributed to Langer. Mrs Betty Kerr, HW Kerr's wife, discussed with Langer the need for some alterations to the design of the residence. One particular change related to the need to block the view to the kitchen from the front door. Prior to Mrs Kerr requesting this change a person at the front door was able to see through to the kitchen.

Langer's plans also provided for the landscaping of the site as well as the provision of a caretaker's cottage. The caretaker's cottage is currently let to tenants. Whilst Langer's plans provided for a caretaker's cottage it is unclear if the existing building which was used as a caretaker's cottage was purpose-built or if the building was already existing when the land was purchased by the institute. The stylistic indicators of the building including its hipped roof, lack of sunhoods due to wide eaves and its corner casement windows suggest a date of mid to late 1930.

Langer's pioneering use of climatic design in Queensland can be seen in the main institute building in the decorative restraint evident in the facade detailing and composition, the efficient but spacious planning of the building and the consideration given to a northern orientation. The northern orientation allowed for improved shading in summer and better light in winter. With the laboratories located on the southern side of the building this orientation allowed for a more even distribution of light to these areas.

Post-war shortages of both skilled labour and materials caused costs to escalate. The new director insisted that the director's residence both accommodate his wife and family of five children plus their maid and "be of a type appropriate to the status of director" and suitable for entertaining guests from overseas. Escalating costs meant that Kerr was asked to modify his expectations and the institute building was completed in stages.

The sugar industry, in 1949, was on the threshold of the buoyant sugar markets of the 1950s and in 1950 Justice Alan Mansfield was appointed to head a Royal Commission for the orderly expansion of the industry. Most mills prepared ambitious plans.

=== The Institute in operation ===
The Sugar Research Institute – "a monument to the Australian sugar industry" – was opened on Saturday, 22 August 1953 by then Federal Treasurer, Sir Arthur Fadden. More than 100 official guests attended the opening during which Fadden stated that "there was no industry in Australia better organised than sugar production" and that "sugar is not only a Queensland industry, not only a national industry, but an international industry of great importance".

The building provided an environment for chemists and engineers to scientifically study the milling process in co-operation with its practical application. The institute's focus from its establishment was to find solutions to industry problems via a program of short-term research and strategic design and construction projects. As a non-government funded research institute, the Sugar Research Institute is comparably rare. CSR was involved in experimental research, so whilst the Sugar Research Institute is not the only example of a private research institution, it is still unusual.

The landscaping of the institute was part of Langer's design, which included the planting of royal palms (Roystonea regia) along the roadside perimeter. The palms were planted in 1954 (a total of 58 at the time) to represent each of the institute's member mills. The second half of the building, the mirror image of the first side, was completed to Langer's original design and opened in August 1966. Mackay architect Harold Vivian Marsh Brown prepared plans for the second stage of the building in 1963.

Twenty-five years after being established, Institute-researched improvements in mill technology had tripled sugar production. By 1972 the institute had developed improvements in cane transportation by improving scheduling, and reducing operating costs and capital expenditure; milling research that improved extraction through improved performance and reductions in capital expenditure; clarification studies that reduced losses and lime consumption; sugar quality; effluent treatment; elongated grain and filterability penalties and air pollution by developing suitable equipment to meet the standards set.

The institute's annual general meetings and technical conferences were always well attended providing opportunities for mill personnel to discuss any issues with factories and to liaise with colleagues. The meetings and conferences were held in the main building in the library/lecture hall on the ground floor, the ETS Pearce Library, until the Charles Young Conference Hall was opened. Eddie Pearce was the general secretary of the Australian Sugar Producers' Association and was a major contributor in the establishment of the Sugar Research Institute.

On 31 August 1973 the Charles Young Conference Hall and laboratories were opened by Rex Patterson then Minister for Northern Development. The hall and laboratories is located to west of the main building and is connected via a covered walkway. The building was named in honour of Charles Young in recognition of his services as founding chairman from January 1949 to August 1973.

The 1990s were a time of economic stringency and an uncertain future. Destabilisation in world markets and changes in US sugar import quotas led to industry restructuring and streamlining in areas such as sugar industry research funding. The Sugar Research Institute, whilst reduced in staff numbers and outsourcing some contracts continued its research and development.

As reported by the Environmental Protection Agency's Sustainable Industries Unit in October 2004, the institute developed more efficient condensers for sugar mills. Researchers at the institute had observed that some vapour condensers operated more efficiently than others, requiring less cooling water flow and subsequently less electrical power for the cooling water circuit. The institute obtained funding through the Sustainable Energy Innovation Fund to analyse the operation of several existing vapour condensers at sugar factories, to develop an improved condenser design to increase efficiency and to monitor the performance of two new condensers built with the new design.

Two prototype condensers were constructed and installed. Compared with conventional designs, the units achieved reductions in cooling water flow rates. By adopting design modifications, the institute estimated the cooling water flow would be reduced by up to 12%, yielding a proportional reduction in energy consumption for water pumping and cooling tower fans leading to annual energy savings. Besides the two prototype condensers three other condensers at Millaquin and Tully Sugar Mills were subsequently constructed and installed for the 2004 crushing season.

Individual researchers from the Sugar Research Institute have also received peer recognition, including the prestigious Sugar Industry Technologists Crystal Award presented to Dr Peter Wright in 2003. The Crystal Award is presented to individuals who have contributed notably to the technological advancement of the sugar refining industry.

Dr Wright began his career as a sugar technologist with the Sugar Research Institute in 1957. He is the first Queensland, and the fourth Australian to receive the Crystal Award. Sugar Industry Technologists Inc was founded in the United States in 1941 by several North American sugar refineries. It has since grown to become an international association with a combined membership of approximately 100 corporate sugar refining companies and corporate allied companies with over 500 individual members worldwide.

=== Closure and redevelopment ===
On 1 July 2005, Sugar Research Limited, trading as Sugar Research Institute, entered into an exclusive affiliation with Queensland University of Technology, providing stakeholders with access to research and consulting facilities. By June 2006 the sale of the property was finalised with the research work of the institute being transferred to Brisbane. The building was then advertised for lease.

It was subsequently refurbished and adapted for use as the Parklands Mackay Business Hub serviced offices.

=== Second Redevelopment ===
In 2021, the institute began redevelopment to become a Catholic secondary school, Catherine McAuley College Mackay, which opened operations on 22 February 2022. As of 2024, the school has added four more buildings to the institute, which will be joined by two more buildings and a full cohort of students by 2027.

== Description ==
The Sugar Research Institute is located along Nebo Road, the main southern highway in and out of Mackay.

The Sugar Research Institute complex is made up of the Main Building, attached Garages, Directors Residence, and Workshop. A covered walkway to the west links the Main Building to a Conference Hall and office/laboratory building. A free-standing laboratory/office building is located behind this group. A corrugated, galvanised iron shed/garage is located at the south east extremity of the site, adjacent to the rear vehicle entrance. A small caretaker's cottage is located at the south west corner.

The Main Building, attached Garages, Directors Residence, and Workshop were constructed in 1953, with the west wing added in 1966. This addition is not readily perceived from the exterior as it has followed the original design intent. The difference in construction period is more apparent from internal finishes and fittings.

=== Landscape Features ===
The dominant landscape feature is the double row of royal palms (Roystonea regia) that line the roadside perimeter of the site. A low face-brick fence runs along the roadside boundary with pillars marking the entrances. A circular bitumen drive is centred on the front entrance of the building.

There are several large established trees adjacent to the Director's Residence and scattered about the site. Planting beds are located immediately in front of the two wings of the main building and within the circular driveway. There is an established, fenced-off domestic garden behind the house.

There is a rear entrance to the site off the west boundary with a bitumen drive linking the various buildings through to the basement access.

The balance of the site is a fenced off paddock to the south.

=== Main (Institute) Building ===
Exterior The institute is a two-storey face-brick building with a sub-floor basement. The building is best described stylistically as being "stripped classical", given its symmetrical massing and emphasised classical portico. The classical idiom is maintained through the use of white marble for the entrance steps and cladding to the walls, columns and ceiling of the portico. Two pedestals intended to support sculptures flank the entrance which would have further emphasised the classical theme.

Low pedestals either side of the marble stairs have a rough textured finish. This finish appears to be a recent application.

The portico has a central glazed double door with sheet bronze finish. Surrounding the door, the portico is fully glazed in bronze framing. There is a marble spandrel panel above door height with obscure glazing above this.

The windows to the east and west wings of the northern facade are made up of 15 pairs of vertically proportioned, painted timber windows set between painted plastered columns at ground and first floor. At each level, a painted concrete canopy projects over the windows. There is a painted concrete sill which projects slightly.

The face-brick wall is capped with what appears to be a painted sheet metal coping (probably covering the original coping).

The east elevation has been plastered and painted. Three painted timber framed windows at ground level serve the Directors Office. The frames of two smaller windows to the toilet have replaced with aluminium.

A vertical construction joint divides the south (rear) elevation marking the junction of the 1953 and 1966 construction phases. The slight difference in the colour and texture of the bricks is apparent.

The south elevation is occupied almost entirely by two continuous bands of windows following an identical pattern to the north elevation but without the projecting centre bay. At ground floor level two doors interrupt the pattern at the eastern end and toward the centre two window bays have been removed and in filled with fibre cement boarding and an aluminium window. At the western end a vehicle ramp leads down to a roller shutter door to the basement.

The only penetration in the west elevation is a doorway inserted to link to the covered walkway to the Conference Hall. The words "Sugar Research Institute" are fixed to the wall at first floor level.

The roof of the Main Building is a low-pitched Dutch gable covered with corrugated, asbestos cement roofing sheets. It is set behind a substantial parapet wall on all four sides. Four prominent, sheet metal rain water heads are set symmetrically on the surface of the brickwork on both of the north and south elevations and drain into sheet metal, rectangular section, surface mounted downpipes.

==== Interior Basement ====
The basement is a utilitarian space extending under the west wing of the institute. It is accessed from a staircase below the main staircase in the entrance hall and from a vehicle ramp at the south west corner at the rear of the building. There is also an open well at the northwest corner of the building which gives access to ground and first floor from the basement. A goods hoist and beam are suspended below the first floor ceiling. A steep, steel industrial staircase and balustrade connects the three levels.

The walls and ceiling are unfinished concrete and the floor has a smooth cement render finish.

The plant located in the basement is presumably part of the air- conditioning installation and electrical distribution. Other plant and installations presumably relate to the laboratory functions on the first floor.

==== Ground floor ====
The ground floor of the institute building is primarily made up of offices, lecture rooms, and other administrative spaces. All open off a central corridor running the length of the building from the central entrance hall.

The entrance hall is an impressive double volume with the marble finish of the portico carried through to the stair treads, skirtings and the internal masonry faces of the window wall. The floor has a glass mosaic finish in a simple two-tone grid pattern with a ceramic tile skirting. The walls generally have a rough plaster and paint finish. The ceiling, as for most of the building, is made up of gypsum plaster panels with acoustic perforations.

There is a timber lined opening into the adjoining office which served as an enquiries counter. This office also contains a strong room, the door manufactured by Ajax safe manufacturing company of Sydney.

Glazed double doors open off the south wall of the entrance hall into a library/lecture hall [Named the ETS Pearce Library]. There is an etched border to each glass panel and what appears to be stylised sugar crystal etched in the centre.

Offices opening off the corridor are cross ventilated with vertical, adjustable, obscure glass louvers in timber frames above door head height. The louvers as well as some fixed glazing panels also provide borrowed natural light for the corridor.

The different construction periods of the east and west wings is evident in the finishes and fittings. In the earlier east wing more is made of timber finishes, in particular the use of panelling (in the director's office) where Queensland Silky Oak veneer panels are framed with Queensland maple. Queensland maple is used throughout the building for skirtings, architraves, jamb linings, hand rails and fittings.

The office partition walls are of painted framed hardboard to both wings. The west wing however appears to have undergone more change and ad hoc rearrangement of the walls. The east wing retains much of the original layout and fabric.

Door handles to the east wing are a distinctive lever type while those to the west wing are plain, stainless steel knob-sets.

The toilets in the east wing are largely in original condition. Floors are glass mosaic with ceramic tile skirtings. Cubicle panels are terrazzo. Splash-backs to the hand basins and to the urinal are ceramic tiled. Walls are painted. Cubicle doors are painted timber with an unusual scalloped top and bottom. Towel rails and toilet roll holders appear to be original and match the door furniture. A number of the sanitary fittings appear to be original.

Vinyl (possibly asbestos) floor tiles were used throughout the building. A number of offices have been carpeted, usually directly over the vinyl. In some areas the vinyl tiles have been replaced with new tiles.

Ceilings are generally gypsum plaster with acoustic perforations and may be fixed directly to the concrete slab. In the west wing there is some variation in the size and pattern of the panels.

Air conditioning has been introduced into the offices in an ad hoc manner but without serious damage to the fabric. A duct runs above the window head on the south elevation of the east wing. In the west wing ducting has been located above a lowered ceiling to the corridor. Elsewhere ducting and plant have been hidden behind walls and in sections of lowered ceiling.

==== First floor ====
The first floor of the institute building is primarily made up of laboratory and ancillary spaces. A central corridor opens off the upper level of the entrance hall. The corridor merges into large laboratory spaces at the end of each wing.

The upper level of the entrance hall is in the form of a gallery overlooking the entrance. The words "ER Behne Laboratory" are located on the south wall at the head of the stairs. The words "ER Behne Laboratory" are located on the south wall at the head of the stairs. The laboratory is named for Edmund Rowlands Behne who was on the board of directors of the institute from 1949 to 1975, serving as deputy chairman between 1964 and 1973 and as chairman from 1973 to 1975.

The colours of the glass mosaic floor below are repeated, without the grid pattern. The steel balustrade and timber hand rail continue round the gallery. Male and female toilets open off the east side of the gallery.

As with the ground floor, the east wing is the more unified in its detail design and use of fittings and fixed furniture. While laboratory fittings in both wings are in similar configurations, their detailing, fittings and tap ware are distinctive. The fittings in the east wing are generally more robust and carefully detailed. Those in the west wing are a mix of open benches and units similar to those in the east wing. There has been a considerable amount of alteration to all the laboratories with the installation of equipment such as fume cupboards and electrical installations.

The laboratory at the eastern end of the east wing has a quarry tile floor which may be a later addition. Elsewhere floors are vinyl tile, some of which show signs of heavy use.

As with the ground floor air conditioning has been introduced to various parts of the upper floor in an ad hoc manner. Some areas have lowered ceilings concealing the ducting while in other areas (mainly the east wing) the ducting has been located in the roof space.

=== Garage Building ===
Three single garages are linked at ground level via a short passage to the east wing of the Main building. The north wall is plastered and painted with the words "Sugar Research Institute" fixed to the top of the wall. The plaster has horizontal coursing marks. The remaining walls are face-brick. The roof is low pitched, hipped, covered with corrugated asbestos cement tiles and set behind parapet walls. There is a marble coping to all the parapets.

The garage doors are roller shutters, but the timber frames indicate that there were originally side-hung double doors.

The interior of the garages was not viewed.

=== Director's Residence ===
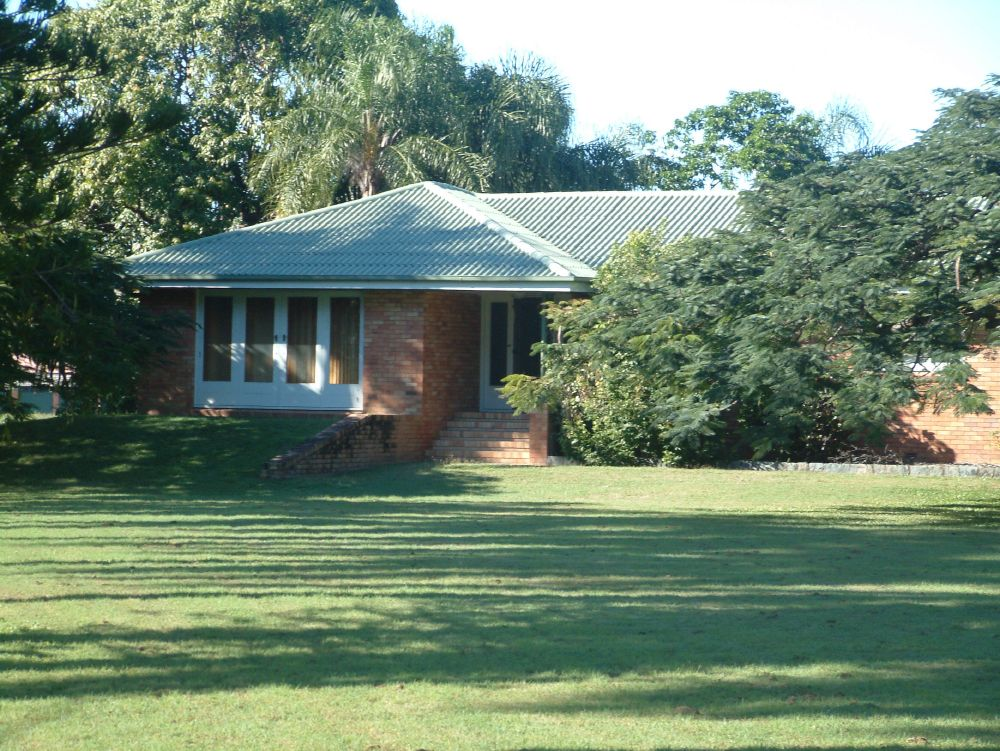
Residence, 2006

The Director's residence is attached to the garage building. It has a hipped, corrugated asbestos cement tiled roof which is contiguous with the garage roof; however over the house the parapet wall gives way to overhanging eaves. Walls are face-brick and doors and windows are timber casements and painted white.

Brick stairs lead up to the recessed entrance. The lawn is ramped up to the bi-fold doors of the living room. At the rear of the house a raised semi-enclosed, covered patio area opens onto an informal garden area. The garden is enclosed with pool fencing.

Internally the Directors residence has generous living and dining areas located to the east of the entrance and the bedroom wing to the west. The bedrooms open to the north off a long passage while bath room, toilet and kitchen open to the south. A servery area is located between the kitchen and dining room.

The living/dining areas have fixed timber shelving and cupboards and in each bedroom an entire wall is fitted out with cupboards, shelving and drawers. The kitchen fittings are similarly ample. The joinery is generally of a high standard. Several units have a painted finish but it is likely that all were originally varnished.

Floors are timber and appear to have been sanded and sealed with a polyurethane finish. Bedroom floors have been carpeted. The kitchen and bathrooms have recent vinyl sheet coverings. Walls are generally plastered and painted. Ceilings to the bedrooms appear to be original plaster board with rounded cover strips and moulded cornices. The living/dining area appears to have a recent plasterboard ceiling. The passage and entrance area has a recent lowered ceiling to accommodate air conditioning ducting.

=== Workshop ===
The workshop building has a short covered link to the rear of the Main building and forms part of the original construction. It has subsequently become totally enclosed by later structures forming covered parking areas and workshop extensions. The hipped roof of corrugated asbestos cement tiles and the face-brick external walls however remain largely intact although there have been door and window insertions.

Internally the building consists of several rooms with bench space and stainless steel sinks. One room is fitted out as a darkroom.

=== Charles Young Conference Hall ===
The Charles Young Conference Hall and laboratories is a single storey brick building located to the west of the main building and connected via a covered walkway. The covered walkway is the strongest feature of the building forming a veranda and covered entrance to the Conference Hall. It consists of a heavy painted concrete canopy and projecting beams supported on dressed concrete columns.

The conference hall has a large span roof with a pre-coated profiled steel roofing sheet covering. It follows a roughly mansard form rising above low parapets.

The Conference hall building is a simple rectangle with a covered walkway on the east side. Walls are rectangular face-brick panels with narrow, full-height slot windows in between. These windows are all covered with a decorative, pre-formed aluminium sheet sun- screening. Areas opening on to the veranda have full-height aluminium framed glazing and doors.

A wing of offices and laboratories extends to the east of the hall behind the Main (Institute) building. This wing has a low pitched gabled roof finished as for the hall roof with boxed-in eaves. Walls are of face-brick. Windows and doors are aluminium framed.

Internally the conference hall is a large clear space with vinyl floor tiles, face-brick walls and large coffered ceiling panels. The hall is well provided with conference facilities.

The office/laboratory area has vinyl tile floors; exterior walls are plastered and painted while all internal subdivision of spaces is made up of light aluminium framed partitioning system with timber ply panels and clear glazing above door head height. Fittings are generally made up of Formica finished panels on steel framing.

== Heritage listing ==
Sugar Research Institute & Residence was listed on the Queensland Heritage Register on 14 March 2008 having satisfied the following criteria.

The place is important in demonstrating the evolution or pattern of Queensland's history.

The sugar industry, its processes and way of life has made an influential contribution to the pattern of Queensland society and environment.

Mackay Sugar Research Institute is significant for its part in the development of Queensland's sugar history as a non-Government sugar industry funded and controlled research centre with the construction in 1953 of the western section of the main Institute Building, the Director's Residence and a Utilities Building and in 1966 the eastern section of the main Institute Building and later in 1973 the construction of the Charles Young Conference Hall.

The research undertaken at the Sugar Research Institute continued, complemented and surpassed the earlier Sugar Experiment Station. The construction of the Sugar Research Institute provides tangible evidence of the commitment that was given by the sugar industry to sugar research and particularly, the development of the Mackay district as the geographical centre for sugar research and production in Queensland.

The place is important in demonstrating the principal characteristics of a particular class of cultural places.

The Mackay Sugar Research Institute in particular the Main Building, the central part of the workshops, Director's Residence and the circular driveway is significant as a good example of the work of the important and influential architect Karl Langer. It is an inventive and pioneering solution to the problem of architectural design in Queensland under post-World War II building restrictions. Through the decorative restraint evident in the facade detailing and composition, the efficient but spacious planning of the building including its northern orientation, the main institute building is an excellent example of Langer's pioneering the use of climatic design in Queensland.

The place is important because of its aesthetic significance.

The Mackay Sugar Research Institute is significant for its landmark quality including the royal palms (Roystonea regia) that line the roadside perimeter of the site and for the landscape design of the Nebo Road frontage, including the lawns, drive, and low brick fence. The palms were planted in 1954 and represent the Sugar Research Institute's member mills.

The institute building is significant as an example of Karl Langer's work where the decorative restraint evident in the simplicity of the facade detailing and compositional qualities creates particular visual merit. Despite the surrounding area being largely built up, the Sugar Research Institute maintains its distinctive aesthetic qualities (namely its setting, form, composition and condition) and consequently retains its landmark quality in its position along Nebo Road.
