= Paget, Queensland =

Paget Mackay, Queensland
- Coordinates: 21.1847°S 149.1644°E
- Population: 339 (2021 census)
  - Density: 24.04/km^{2} (62.27/sq mi)
- Postcode(s): 4740
- Area: 14.1 km^{2} (5.4 sq mi)
- Time zone: AEST (UTC+10:00)
- Location: 5.6 km (3 mi) SSE of Mackay CBD; 332 km (206 mi) NNW of Rockhampton; 392 km (244 mi) SE of Townsville; 971 km (603 mi) NNW of Brisbane
- LGA(s): Mackay Region
- State electorate(s): Mirani; Mackay
- Federal division(s): Dawson
Suburbs around Paget:
West Mackay	South Mackay	Coral Sea
Ooralea	Paget	Coral Sea
Bakers Creek	Bakers Creek	McEwens Beach

Paget is a coastal suburb of Mackay in the Mackay Region, Queensland, Australia. In the 2021 census, Paget had a population of 339 people.

== Geography ==
Paget is bounded to the east by the Coral Sea, to the west by the Bruce Highway, and to the south by Bakers Creek. The suburb is principally used for industrial purposes. The North Coast railway line passes from south to north through the suburb with the Mackay railway station located in Paget (21.1722°S 149.1597°E).

The land is flat and low-lying (below 10 metres above sea level). The western part of the suburb is principally used for industrial purposes where there is good road and rail access while the eastern oceanside part of the suburb is much less developed. Paget Junction railway station to the north of Mackay railway station (21.1658°S 149.1587°E) was the junction of the North Coast railway line with the now-closed Mackay railway line.

The Bakers Creek Conservation Park occupies the south-east headland created by Bakers Creek entering into the Coral Sea. It is a protected area due to the need to preserve the shorebird habitat consisting of intertidal zones and mangroves; it has been declared a nationally important area for shorebirds. It has a population of the vulnerable species Eracus neglectus (beach stone-curlew). It is considered of internationally significant for migrating shorebirds such as the Charadrius mongolus (lesser sand plover), Numenius madagascariensis (eastern curlew), Calidris tenuirostris (great knot) and Haematopus fuliginosus (sooty oystercatcher).

== History ==
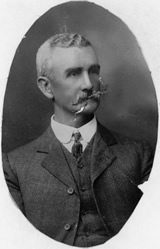
Walter Trueman Paget after whom the suburb was named

The suburb takes its name from the Paget Junction railway station, which, in turn, was named by Queensland Railways Department on 30 October 1913, in honour of politician Walter Trueman Paget who was the Secretary for Railways 1908 to 1915. In 1943, Paget Junction was shortened to Paget.

Mackay Ambulance Station was at on the corner of Alfred Street and Sydney Street in the Mackay CBD until 2006, when it was relocated to Paget.

== Demographics ==
In the 2016 census, Paget had a population of 273 people.

In the 2021 census, Paget had a population of 339 people.

== Education ==
There are no schools in Paget. The nearest government primary schools are Mackay West State School in neighbouring West Mackay to the north and Dundula State School in neighbouring Bakers Creek to the south. The nearest government secondary school is Mackay State High School in South Mackay to the north.

== Facilities ==
Mackay Ambulance Station is at 3 Transport Avenue (21.1692°S 149.1693°E).

Paget Waste Transfer Station & Recycling Centre is at 42 Crichtons Rd (21.1935°S 149.1642°E).

Paget Telephone Exchange is at 89 Broadsound Road (21.1753°S 149.1526°E).

== Amenities ==
Leprechaun Park is a sports centre at 435 Milton Street (21.1847°S 149.1722°E). It is the home ground for Mackay's Brothers Rugby League Club.
