= Mater Misericordiae Hospital, Mackay =

Hospital in Queensland, Australia

Coordinates: 21.1309°S 149.1662°E

The Mater Misericordiae Hospital is a 105-bed hospital in North Mackay, Mackay, Mackay Region, Queensland, Australia. It is operated in the Mercy tradition.

== History ==
The Ormond Private Hospital was established by Dr Charles Emmanuel Williams on the corner of Brisbane and Gordon Street. It opened in May 1911. It was purchased in May 1927 by the Sisters of Mercy who renamed it the Mackay Mater Misericordiae Hospital (Mater Misericordiae translates to Mother of Mercy and was the name used by many hospitals established by this religious order). On Sunday 29 May 1927 the hospital was blessed by the Roman Catholic Bishop of Rockhampton, Joseph Shiel. On 9 August 1936, the Sisters opened a new hospital on Gordon Street with a ceremony conducted by the Roman Catholic Archbishop of Brisbane, James Duhig assisted by the Bishop of Rockhampton, Romuald Denis Hayes.

== Current hospital ==
In 2003, the current Mater Hospital was opened in Willetts Road, North Mackay, with 105 beds.
