= Glenella, Queensland =

Glenella
- Town
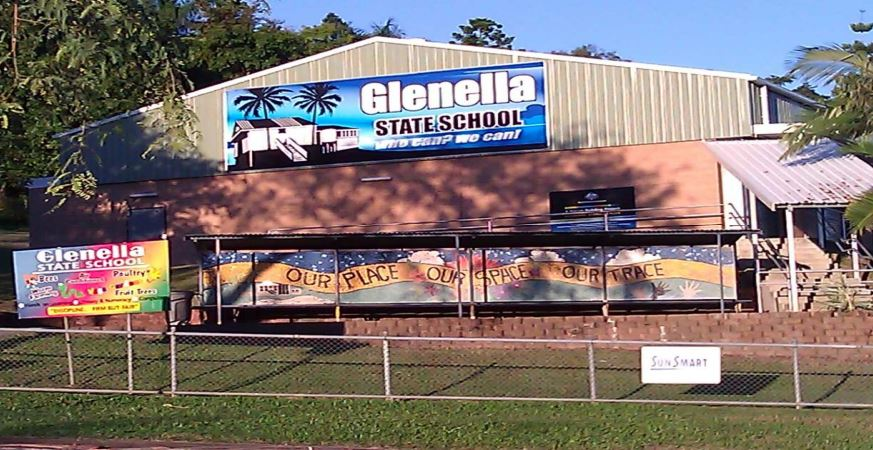
- Glenella State School, 2010

- Interactive map of Glenella
- Coordinates: 21.1198°S 149.1544°E
- Country: Australia
- State: Queensland
- City: Mackay
- LGA: Mackay Region
- Location: 5.7 km (3.5 mi) W of North Mackay; 8.6 km (5.3 mi) SW of Andergrove; 7.4 km (4.6 mi) NW of Mackay CBD; 958 km (595 mi) NNW of Brisbane

Government
  - State electorates: Mackay; Whitsunday
  - Federal division: Dawson

Area
  - Total: 10.8 km^{2} (4.2 sq mi)
- Elevation: 10–60 m (33–197 ft)

Population
  - Total: 4,545 (2021 census)
  - Density: 420.8/km^{2} (1,090/sq mi)
- Time zone: UTC+10:00 (AEST)
- Postcode: 4740
Localities around Glenella
Farleigh	Richmond	Richmond
Farleigh	Glenella	Mount Pleasant
Erakala	Erakala	Foulden

Glenella is a mixed-use town and suburb of Mackay in the Mackay Region, Queensland, Australia. In the 2021 census, the suburb of Glenella had a population of 4,545 people.

== Geography ==
The land is mostly low-lying 10 metres (33 ft) or less above sea level but with some hills rising to 60 metres (200 ft).

The land in the east and south-east of the suburb is residential. There is a small industrial estate in the south-east. The remainder of the suburb remains rural, mostly growing sugarcane and some grazing on native vegetation.

The Bruce Highway passes through the suburb from the east (Mount Pleasant) to the west (Farleigh). The North Coast railway line enters the suburb from the north-east (Richmond) and exits to the west (Farleigh). There is a network of cane tramways through the suburb operated by Mackay Sugar to deliver the harvested sugarcane to the sugar mills, the nearest being Farleigh mill in Farleigh.

== History ==
Mackay North State School opened on 3 February 1879 with an initial enrolment of 35 children. The first teacher was Daniel Shea. It was renamed Glenella State School on 1 April 1912. The school was so badly damaged in the 1918 Mackay cyclone that it was completely rebuilt. (It should not be confused with the current Mackay North State School in North Mackay which opened in 1915). The school was also known informally as Hill End State School as that was an earlier name for Glenella.

Glenella Hall opened on Saturday 8 October 1938 with a dance to raise funds for the Mackay Ambulance. Over 300 people attended. The owner of the hall was Ted Jackson and it was located next door to his Glenalla Hotel on the corner of Hill End Road and Davey Street. The hotel was demolished circa 1980.

== Demographics ==
In the 2011 census, the suburb of Glenella had a population of 4,633 people.

In the 2016 census, the suburb of Glenella had a population of 4,519 people.

In the 2021 census, the suburb of Glenella had a population of 4,545 people.

== Education ==
Glenella State School is a government primary (Prep-6) school for boys and girls at 35-55 Hill End Road (21.1214°S 149.1493°E). In 2018, the school had an enrolment of 189 students with 15 teachers (12 full-time equivalent) and 11 non-teaching staff (7 full-time equivalent). It includes a special education program.

There are no secondary schools in Glenella. The nearest government secondary schools are Mackay North State High School in North Mackay to the south-east and Pioneer State High School in Andergrove to the north-east.

== Amenities ==
Glenella Community Hall is at 15 Hill End Road (21.1187°S 149.1459°E). It is operated by the Mackay Regional Council.
