= Mackay Base Hospital =

Hospital in Mackay, Australia

Coordinates: 21°08′45″S 149°09′19″E

- Queensland Health

Geography
- Location: Mackay, Queensland, North Queensland, QLD, Australia

Organisation
- Care system: Public Medicare (AU)
- Type: Tertiary Referral

Services
- Emergency department: Yes
- Beds: 318

History
- Opened: unknown

Links
- Website: Official Website
- Lists: Hospitals in Australia

The Mackay Base Hospital is the major hospital for the Central Queensland Region situated in Mackay, Queensland, Australia. It is located around 4 kilometres (2.5 mi) from Mackay city centre. The Hospital offers general services to a population of approximately 135,000 throughout Mackay and the surrounding areas including referrals from Moranbah and parts of the Bowen region. The Hospital has a wide range of medical and allied health services. The main referral hospitals are the Townsville Hospital (381 kilometres (237 mi) away) and the Royal Brisbane and Women's Hospital (978 kilometres (608 mi) away).

== Redevelopment ==
In 2010–2014 the Mackay Base Hospital underwent a A$405 million redevelopment. The hospital redevelopment included increasing bed numbers from 163 to 318, adding more operating theatres, a dedicated Coronary Care Unit, a larger Intensive Care Unit, new emergency and outpatients' departments, renal support services, day oncology and a dental services unit, support services building and major services infrastructure, as well as an upgraded helipad and Carpark. Woods Bagot, in association with Sanders Turner Ellick Architects of Mackay, was the architect, and Baulderstone is the managing contractor. The first major area, Mental Health Inpatient Unit, was completed in August 2012. Following the completion of the new buildings the old hospital was demolished.

== Maternity review ==
In 2022, a 10-month review into the hospital's obstetrics and gynaecology service found that inadequate care at the hospital contributed to the deaths of three babies and many women suffered lifelong physical and mental harm. Substandard care, poor clinical incident monitoring and poor management of safety and quality, patient complications and clinical deterioration were among the breaches of care found. 81 women were questioned in the investigation. Many women felt ignored, were left in pain and were discharged back to their general practitioners with incomplete resolution of their problems. A review was undertaken after complaints from women who had suffered complications from caesareans and suggestions of patient harm. The director of the obstetrics and gynaecology unit, Dr Du Toit, was suspended. The Mackay Hospital and Health board was sacked and the hospital lost its accreditation to train doctors in general surgery.

== See also ==
- List of hospitals in Queensland
- List of hospitals in Australia
