= North Mackay =

- Suburb
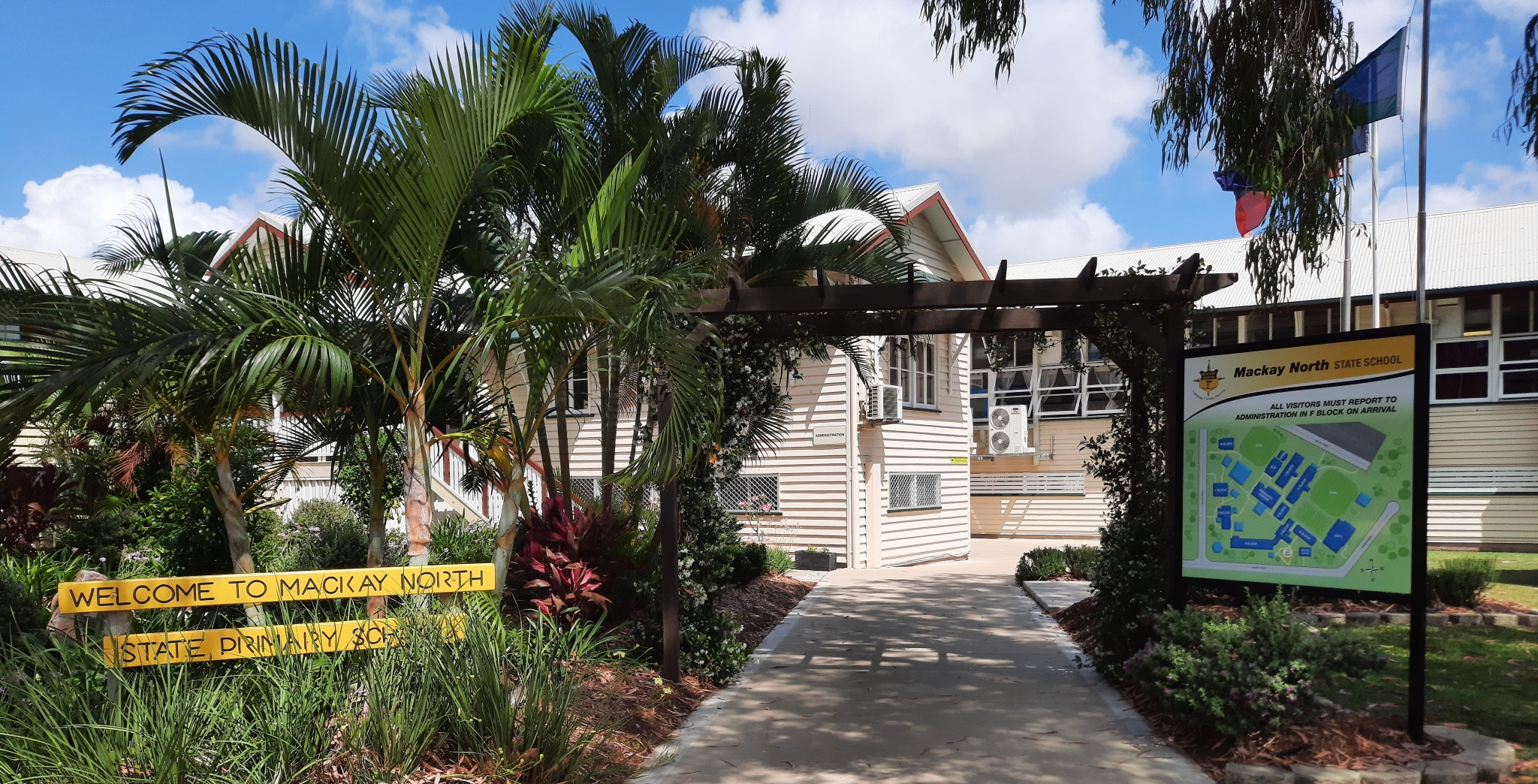
- Mackay North State School, circa 2021

- Interactive map of North Mackay
- Coordinates: 21.1216°S 149.1783°E
- Country: Australia
- State: Queensland
- City: Mackay
- LGA: Mackay Region
- Location: 2.8 km (1.7 mi) N of Mackay CBD; 339 km (211 mi) NNW of Rockhampton; 386 km (240 mi) SE of Townsville; 962 km (598 mi) NNW of Brisbane

Government
  - State electorate: Mackay
  - Federal division: Dawson

Area
  - Total: 7.3 km^{2} (2.8 sq mi)

Population
  - Total: 6,194 (2021 census)
  - Density: 848/km^{2} (2,198/sq mi)
- Time zone: UTC+10:00 (AEST)
- Postcode: 4740
Suburbs around North Mackay
Beaconsfield	Andergrove	Mackay Harbour
Mount Pleasant	North Mackay	Mackay Harbour
West Mackay	Mackay	Cremorne

North Mackay is a suburb of Mackay in the Mackay Region, Queensland, Australia. In the 2021 census, North Mackay had a population of 6,194 people.

Although in present times North Mackay is an officially and precisely bounded area, historically and in informal use the term "North Mackay" or "Mackay North" may refer to any part of Mackay north of the Pioneer River. For a part of its life, it and surrounding suburbs were also actually part of the historic Shire of Pioneer.

== Geography ==
As the name suggests, North Mackay is the suburb to the north of the central suburb of Mackay, separated by the Pioneer River.

The suburb is bounded by Norris Road to the west, the Mackay Harbour branch of the North Coast railway to the north, Vines Creek to the east and Barnes Creek and the Pioneer River to the south. Harbour Road passes through the east of the suburb and is the arterial access to the harbour. The suburb is predominantly residential although there are some small industrial areas in the suburb. The suburb also has a number of community facilities, including numerous schools and the Mater Misericordiae Hospital.

== History ==
The Ormond Private Hospital was established by Dr Charles Emmanuel Williams on the corner of Brisbane and Gordon Street. It opened in May 1911. It was purchased in May 1927 by the Sisters of Mercy who renamed it the Mackay Mater Misericordiae Hospital (Mater Misericordiae translates to Mother of Mercy and was the name used by many hospitals established by this religious order). On Sunday 29 May 1927 the hospital was blessed by the Roman Catholic Bishop of Rockhampton, Joseph Shiel. On 9 August 1936, the Sisters opened a new hospital on Gordon Street with a ceremony conducted by the Roman Catholic Archbishop of Brisbane, James Duhig assisted by the Bishop of Rockhampton, Romuald Denis Hayes. In 2003, a modern Mater Hospital was opened in Willett Street, North Mackay, with 105 beds.

Mackay North State School opened on 23 March 1915. It should not be confused with Glenalla State School which was originally opened in 1879 under the name Mackay North State School but was renamed Glenalla State School in 1912. Mackay North State School opened on 23 March 1915.

North Mackay Presbyterian Church opened in 1933. In 1975, the Scots Presbyterian Church was opened, with the former church being retained as a church hall.

St Joseph's Catholic Primary School was established on 1 August 1936 by the Sisters of Mercy. On 2 February 1937, Bishop Romuald Denis Hayes officially opened the school, dedicating it to Saint Joseph.

North Mackay Methodist Church opened in 1958, becoming the North Mackay Uniting Church when the Methodist churches entered the Uniting Church in Australia in 1977. It has subsequently closed. It was at 38 Grendon Street (21.1219°S 149.1895°E). The church building is still extant but in private ownership.

North Mackay State High School opened on 28 January 1964.

Fitzgerald State School opened on 30 January 1979.

Mackay Christian College opened on 1 February 1984.

St Matthew's Lutheran Church opened in 1962. It was at 10 Hicks Street (21.1200°S 149.1745°E). It has since closed but the church building is still extant in private ownership.

== Demographics ==
In the 2016 census, North Mackay had a population of 5,933 people.

In the 2021 census, North Mackay had a population of 6,194 people.

== Education ==
Mackay North State School is a government primary (Prep–6) school for boys and girls on the corner of Evans Avenue and Harvey Street (21.1220°S 149.1840°E). In 2016, the school had an enrolment of 395 students with 33 teachers (17 full-time equivalent) and 17 non-teaching staff (12 equivalent full-time). In 2018, the school had an enrolment of 419 students with 33 teachers (29 full-time equivalent) and 16 non-teaching staff (13 full-time equivalent). It includes a special education program.

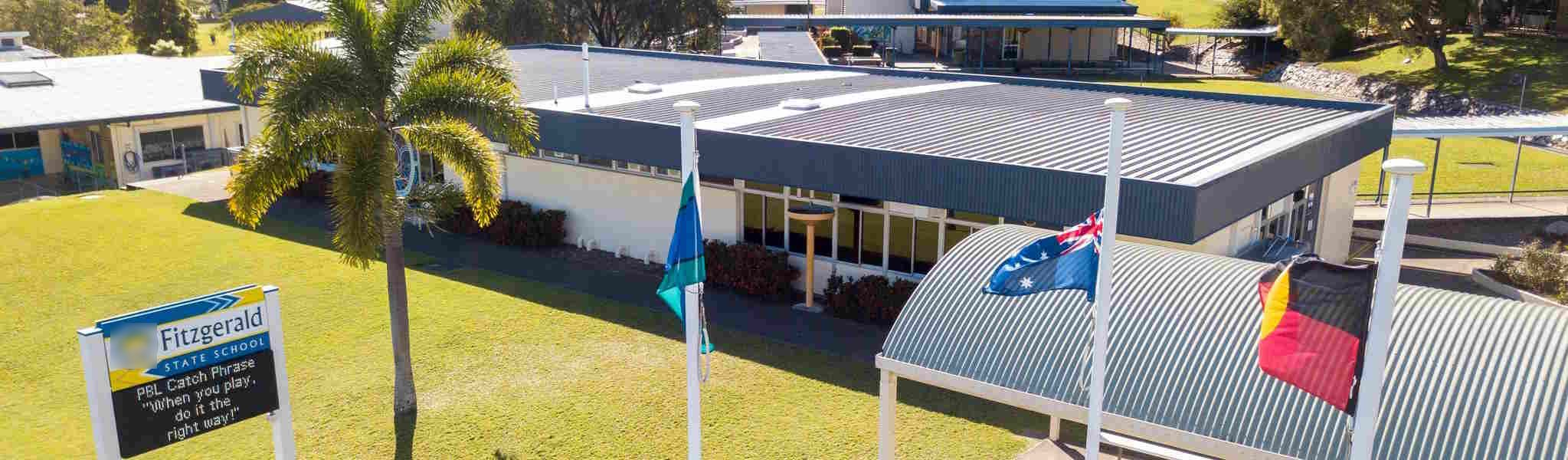
Fitzgerald State School, 2025

Fitzgerald State School is a government primary (Prep–6) school for boys and girls on Norris Road (21.1151°S 149.1681°E). In 2018, the school had an enrolment of 659 students with 52 teachers (43 full-time equivalent) and 24 non-teaching staff (18 full-time equivalent). It includes a special education program.

St Joseph's Catholic Primary School is a Catholic primary (Prep–6) school for boys and girls at 4 Canberra Street (21.1226°S 149.1868°E). In 2018, the school had an enrolment of 297 students with 22 teachers (19 full-time equivalent) and 17 non-teaching staff (11 full-time equivalent).Mackay Christian College is a private primary and secondary (6–12) school for boys and girls at 9 Quarry Street (21.1150°S 149.1824°E). In 2018, the school had an enrolment of 791 students with 64 teachers (56 full-time equivalent) and 87 non-teaching staff (46 full-time equivalent).

Mackay Christian College is a private primary and secondary (Prep–12) school for boys and girls. It has its Prep-5 campus at 17 Ambrose Way (21.1139°S 149.1772°E) and its 6-12 campus at 9 Quarry Street (21.1150°S 149.1824°E). In 2018, the school had an enrolment of 791 students with 64 teachers (56 full-time equivalent) and 87 non-teaching staff (46 full-time equivalent).

Mackay North State High School is a government secondary (7–12) school for boys and girls on Valley Street (21.1156°S 149.1738°E). In 2016, the school had an enrolment of 1,345 students with 111 teachers (106 full-time equivalent) and 48 non-teaching staff (37 full-time equivalent). In 2018, the school had an enrolment of 1,289 students with 105 teachers (99 full-time equivalent) and 49 non-teaching staff (39 full-time equivalent). It includes a special education program.

== Amenities ==
There are a number of churches in the suburb including:

- St Joseph's Catholic Church, 21 Grendon Street
- St Ambrose Anglican Church, 28 Glenpark Street
- Mackay Presbyterian Church, 89 Evans Avenue (21.1220°S 149.1843°E)
- North Mackay Seventh-Day Adventist Church, 19 Holack Street
- Mackay Apostolic Church of Queensland, 79 Sams Road
- New Apostolic Church Mackay, 15 Knobel Street
- Mackay Christian Family Church, 17 Ambrose Way
- New Life Church, 75 Evans Avenue North
