= South Mackay, Queensland =

South Mackay
- Suburb
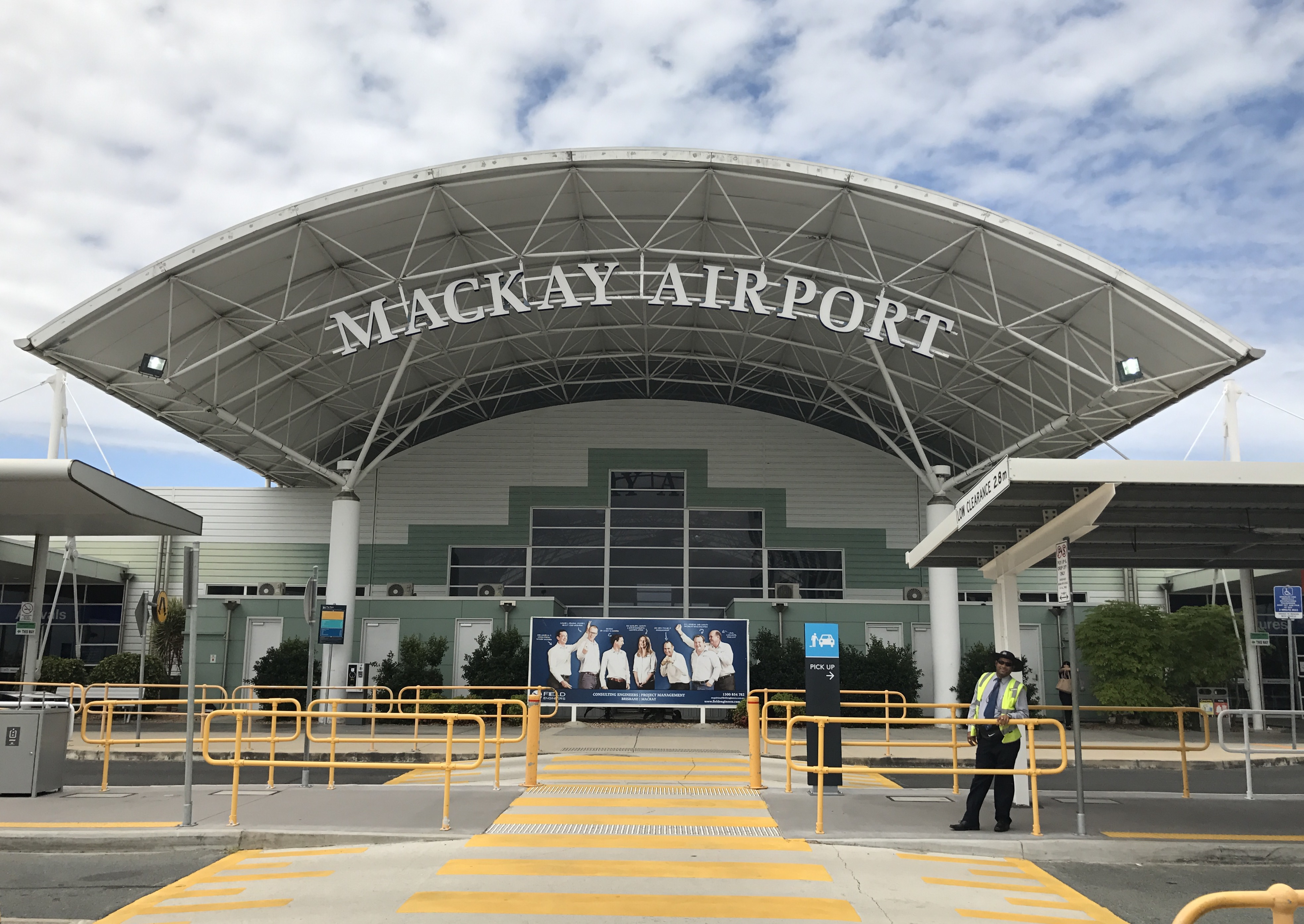
- Mackay Airport Terminal Building, 2016

- Interactive map of South Mackay
- Coordinates: 21.1652°S 149.1811°E
- Country: Australia
- State: Queensland
- City: Mackay
- LGA: Mackay Region
- Location: 1.6 km (0.99 mi) S of Mackay CBD; 336 km (209 mi) NNW of Rockhampton; 388 km (241 mi) SE of Townsville; 974 km (605 mi) NNW of Brisbane

Government
  - State electorate: Mackay
  - Federal division: Dawson

Area
  - Total: 7.2 km^{2} (2.8 sq mi)

Population
  - Total: 6,918 (2021 census)
  - Density: 961/km^{2} (2,489/sq mi)
- Time zone: UTC+10:00 (AEST)
- Postcode: 4740
Suburbs around South Mackay
West Mackay	Mackay	East Mackay
West Mackay	South Mackay	East Mackay
Paget	Paget	Coral Sea

South Mackay is a coastal suburb of Mackay in the Mackay Region, Queensland, Australia. In the 2021 census, South Mackay had a population of 6,918 people.

== Geography ==
As its name suggests, the suburb of South Mackay is immediately to the south of the central suburb of Mackay. Adjoining the Coral Sea, South Mackay has flat land just above sea level apart from a small hill (approx 10 metres above sea level) in the south-east of the locality.

The flat nature of the land made it suitable for use as an airport. The Mackay Airport occupies the south-eastern half of the suburb with suburban development in the north and west of the suburb. There are a number of sports fields between the airport and the residential areas, including the Souths Rugby League Club, the Souths Hockey Club, the City Brothers Football Club and Harrup Park Country Club (hosting a number of sports include the Mackay Cricket Association and AFL Mackay).

== History ==
Mackay State High School opened on 5 February 1912 as part of the Mackay Technical College in Alfred Street, Mackay. 76 students presented for entry examinations on the first day. Between 1959 and 1962, the high school was relocated to its current campus in Milton Street, South Mackay.

Our Lady of Mt Carmel School was opened on 23 November 1923 by the Sisters of Mercy under the leadership of Sister M Dympna O'Reilly. It was officially opened by Joseph Shiel, the Roman Catholic Bishop of Rockhampton. The Bishop's decision to establish the school in South Mackay was questioned at the time as the school was so distant (2 kilometres (1.2 mi)) from the Mackay township. It is unclear when the school adopted the name St Mary's Catholic School but it was in use by 1936. From 1981, the school has been operating under lay leadership.

In July 1927, the Mackay Chamber of Commerce became aware that the Australian Government was thinking of establishing airmail services within Australia "wherever they could be justified". In January 1928, the Mackay Chamber of Commerce first considered creating an aerodrome to prepare for the growth in air traffic, suggesting in March 1928 that the Town Common might be a suitable location. In April 1928 the Mackay City Council voted to provide the land if an aerodrome was required. In September 1928, Captain John Henry Arthur Treacy, chief pilot of the Queensland Air Navigation Co. Ltd., flew over Mackay looking for suitable locations and confirmed that the Town Common appeared very suitable and could be converted to an aerodrome at very little cost. In July 1929, Captain Treacy tells Mackay to create an aerodrome as the coastal air service will soon commence at other towns' aerodromes while Mackay will miss out; he again confirmed the suitability of the town commons as a site. In October 1929, the Chamber of Commerce was advised that, if Mackay had an aerodrome, it would be included in the plans for an airmail service to be commenced by the Australian Postmaster General's department that would visit Mackay three or four times a week. In February 1930, the Mackay City Council was advised by the Controller of Civil Aviation that the town commons site would be suitable after the trees and shrubs removed and the surface made firm and even. Based on an estimated cost of these works to be £250, the council voted to proceed with setting aside the land on the town commons for an aerodrome. On Monday 21 April 1930, approximately 2,000 people cheered as the monoplane Star of Townsville under the command of Captain Treacy landed on the new Mackay Aerodrome (the former Town Common). The mayor of Mackay, Alderman Wood, then officially opened the aerodrome. In January 1931, the aerodrome was approved and licensed by the Civil Aviation branch of the Defence Department as being suitable for all types of land aeroplanes, enabling the council to begin charging landing fees.

On 18 August 1935, the foundation stone was laid for St Mary's Catholic Church. On Sunday 7 June 1936, the church in Juliet street was officially opened by Bishop Romuald Hayes.

In 1968, Our Lady of Mercy Convent High School was opened in Penn Street as a Catholic secondary school for girls in Penn Street. It was renamed Our Lady of Mercy College. In 1987, it amalgamated with St Patrick's College, a Catholic secondary school for boys established by the Christian Brothers in 1929, to create the co-educational Mercy College.

== Demographics ==
In the 2016 census, South Mackay had a population of 6,706 people.

In the 2021 census, South Mackay had a population of 6,918 people.

== Education ==
St Mary's Catholic Primary School is a Catholic primary (Prep–6) school for boys and girls at 42 Juliet Street (21.1538°S 149.1845°E). In 2018, the school had an enrolment of 373 students with 22 teachers (19 full-time equivalent) and 19 non-teaching staff (11 full-time equivalent).

Mackay State High School is a government secondary (7–12) school for boys and girls at 123 Milton Street (21.1525°S 149.1767°E). In 2016, the school had an enrolment of 1,062 students with 483 girls and 579 boys with 89 teachers (85 full-time equivalent) and 53 non-teaching staff (37 full-time equivalent). In 2018, the school had an enrolment of 1,071 students with 85 teachers (82 full-time equivalent) and 48 non-teaching staff (35 full-time equivalent). It includes a special education program.

Mercy College is a Catholic secondary (7–10) school for boys and girls at Penn Street (21.1548°S 149.1831°E). In 2018, the school had an enrolment of 957 students with 68 teachers (67 full-time equivalent) and 51 non-teaching staff (39 full-time equivalent).

There are no government primary schools in South Mackay. The nearest government primary schools are Mackay Central State School in neighbouring Mackay CBD to the north, Victoria Park State School in neighbouring East Mackay to the north-east, and Mackay West State School in neighbouring West Mackay to the west.

== Amenities ==
St Mary's Catholic Church is at 46 Juliet Street (21.1533°S 149.1844°E). It is within the Roman Catholic Diocese of Rockhampton.

Armitage Uniting Church is on the corner of Evans Street and Kennedy Street (21.1522°S 149.1908°E).
