= Mackay State High School =

High School in Australia

Coordinates: 21.1523°S 149.1774°E

- Mackay, Queensland; Australia

Information
- Type: Public
- Established: 1912
- Principal: Felicity Roberts
- Enrolment: Around 1030
- Website: Official website

Mackay State High School is a government secondary school at 123 Milton Street, South Mackay, Mackay, Mackay Region, Queensland, Australia. The school offers education to students from grades 7 to 12 and provides a range of academic programs to suit different interests and abilities. The school's facilities include modern classrooms, science labs, computer rooms, a library, sports facilities, and a cafeteria.

In 2021, the school employed 92 teaching staff and educated around 1030 students and has an average class size of 22 in grades 7 to 10 and an average class size of 16 in grades 11 to 12.

The school has a 100% completion rate on the QCE for the years 2019 and 2021 with 2020 being 99%. In the year 2021, Mackay State High School had 110 of its Year 12 cohort receive one or more VET qualifications (including SAT). The school achieved an 87.17% attendance rate across all student year levels which has been decreasing by 1% annually since 2019.

== History ==
The school opened on 29 January 1912 and, as of 2017, educates around 1040 students. It is one of the oldest state secondary schools in Queensland.

In the past, students from Mackay State High School have obtained high academic results.

== Notable alumni ==
- Todd Blanchfield – basketballer
- George Christensen – former politician
- Jason Costigan – former politician and radio commentator
- Kalyn Ponga – rugby league player

== Notable staff ==
- Don Saunders
