= Broken River, Queensland =

Broken River
- Suburb
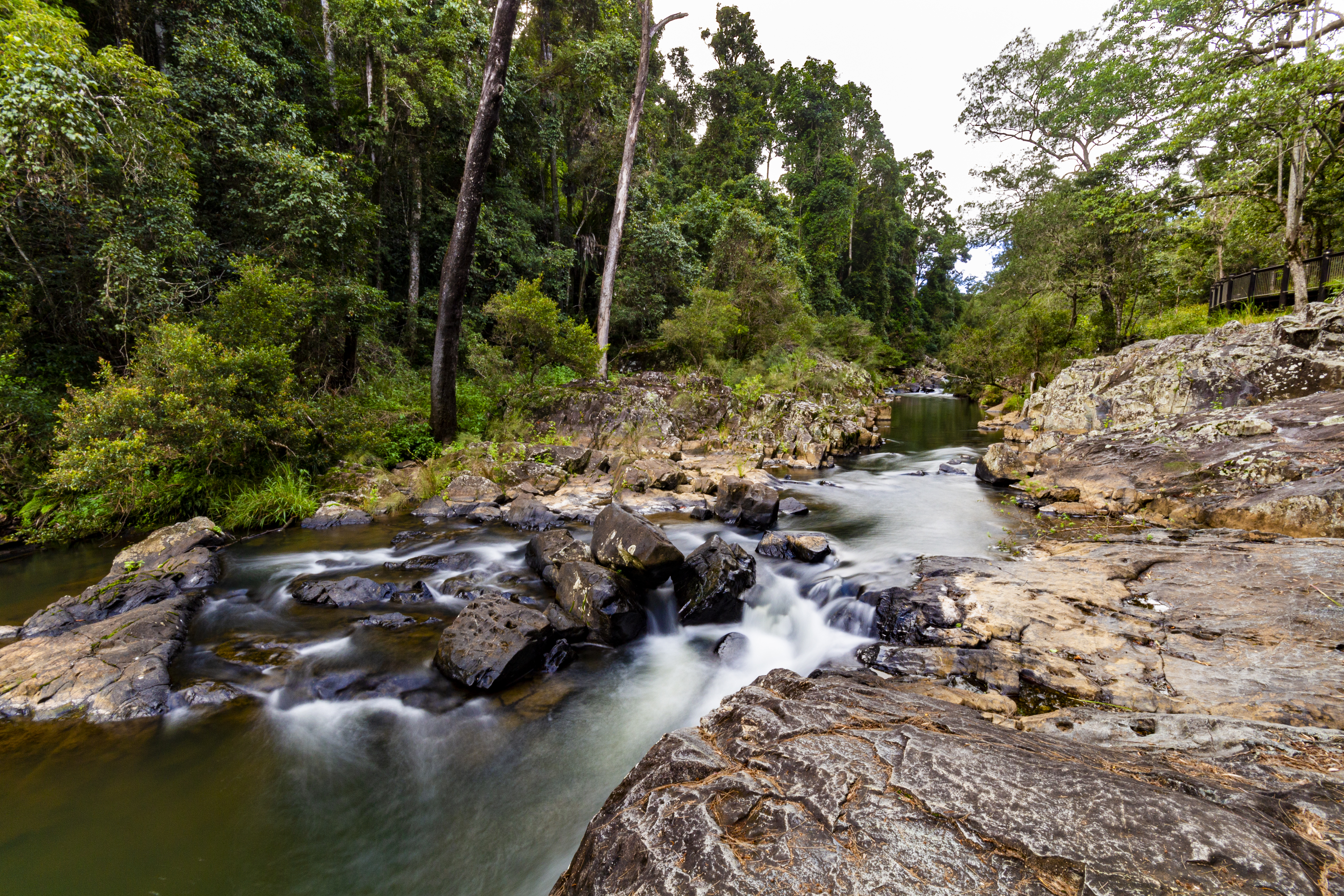
- Broken River flowing through the locality of Broken River, 2021

- Interactive map of Broken River
- Coordinates: 21.1669°S 148.51°E
- Country: Australia
- State: Queensland
- LGA: Mackay Region
- Location: 5.4 km (3.4 mi) S of Eungella; 49.4 km (30.7 mi) W of Mirani; 86.5 km (53.7 mi) W of Mackay; 2,051 km (1,274 mi) NNW of Brisbane

Government
  - State electorate: Mirani
  - Federal division: Capricornia

Area
  - Total: 5.8 km^{2} (2.2 sq mi)

Population
  - Total: 18 (2021 census)
  - Density: 3.10/km^{2} (8.04/sq mi)
- Time zone: UTC+10:00 (AEST)
- Postcode: 4757
Suburbs around Broken River
Eungella	Eungella	Netherdale
Eungella	Broken River	Crediton
Crediton	Crediton	Crediton

Broken River is a rural locality in the Mackay Region, Queensland, Australia. In the 2021 census, Broken River had a population of 18 people.

== Geography ==
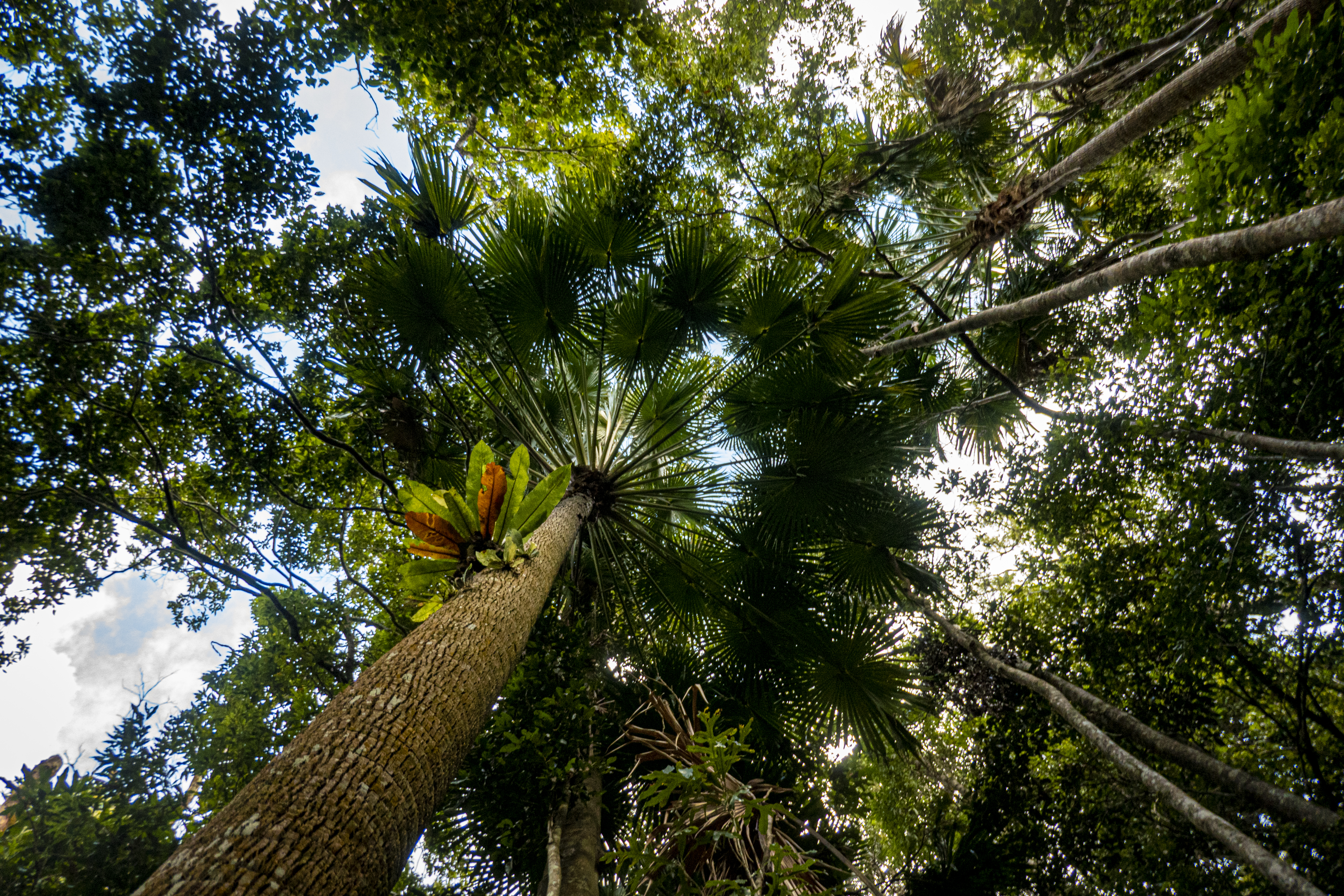
Rain forest, 2021

The watercourse Broken River rises in the Clarke Range in Crediton to the south-east, entering the locality from the locality from the south-east, then flowing west through the locality, exiting to the west (Eungella). It subsequently flows through the Eungella Dam and ultimately is a tributary of the Bowen River.

The Eungella Dam Road enters the locality from the north-west (Eungella), forms part of the western boundary of the locality, before crossing through the locality, exiting to the south (Crediton).

The north, east, and south of the locality is within the Eungella National Park, which extends in neighbouring Eungella, Netherdale, and Crediton. Apart from this protected area, the land use is predominantly grazing on native vegetation.

== Demographics ==
In the 2016 census, Broken River had a population of 22 people.

In the 2021 census, Broken River had a population of 18 people.

== Education ==
There are no schools in Broken River. The nearest government primary school is Eungella State School in neighbouring Eungella to the north. The nearest government secondary school is Mirani State High School in Mirani to the east.

== Attractions ==
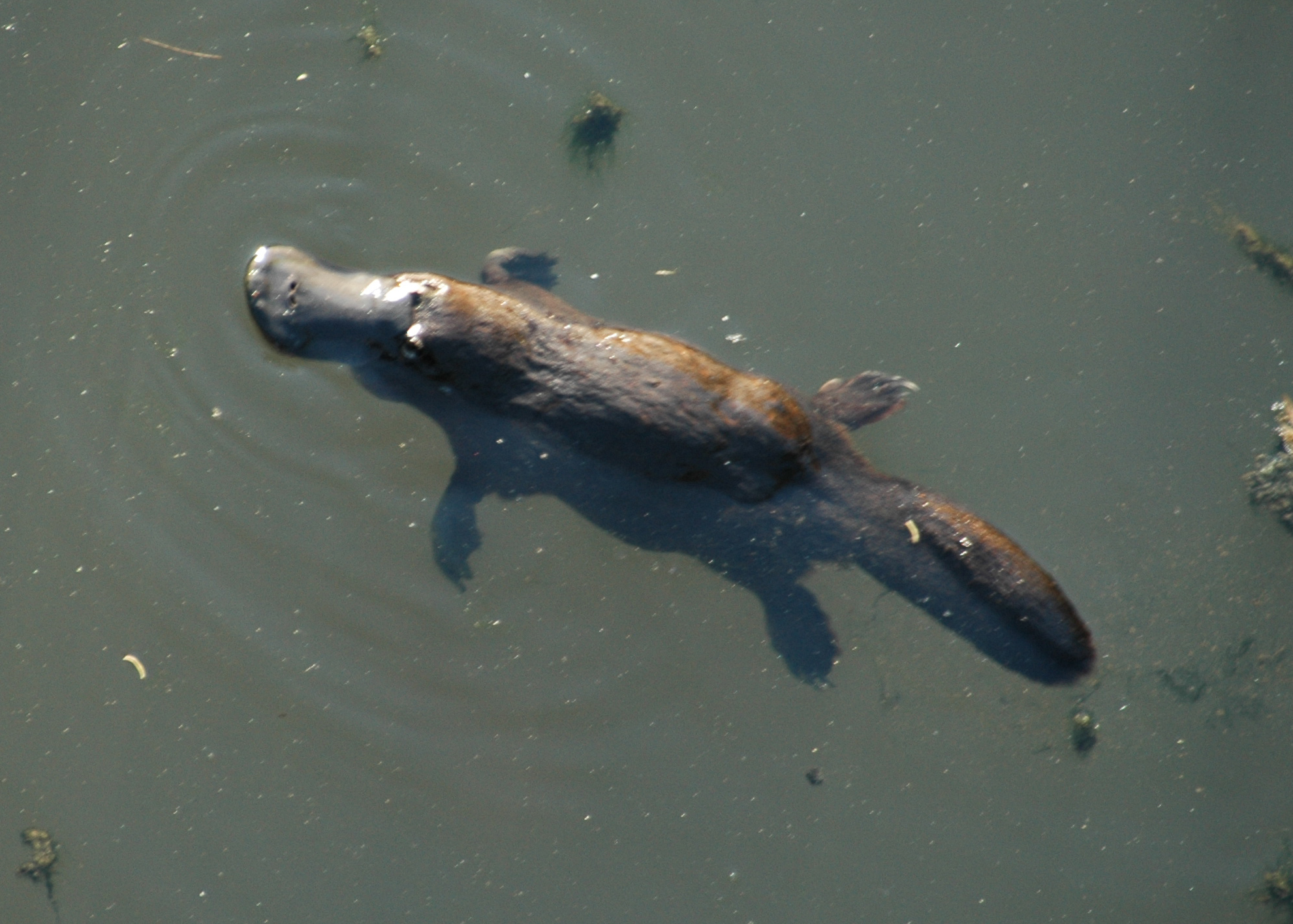
Platypus in the Broken River, 2004

The Broken River visitor area of the Eungella National Park is on the Eungella Dam Road immediately to the south of its crossing of the Broken River (21.1683°S 148.5048°E). It offers platypus viewing and walking tracks, with picnic, BBQ, and camping areas.

Broken River Mountain Resort is a commercial accommodation provider at 524 Eungella Dam Road, immediately north of the Broken River adjacent to the Eungella National Park (21.1675°S 148.5043°E).
