= Cyclone Aivu =

1989 tropical cyclone

Severe Tropical Cyclone Aivu
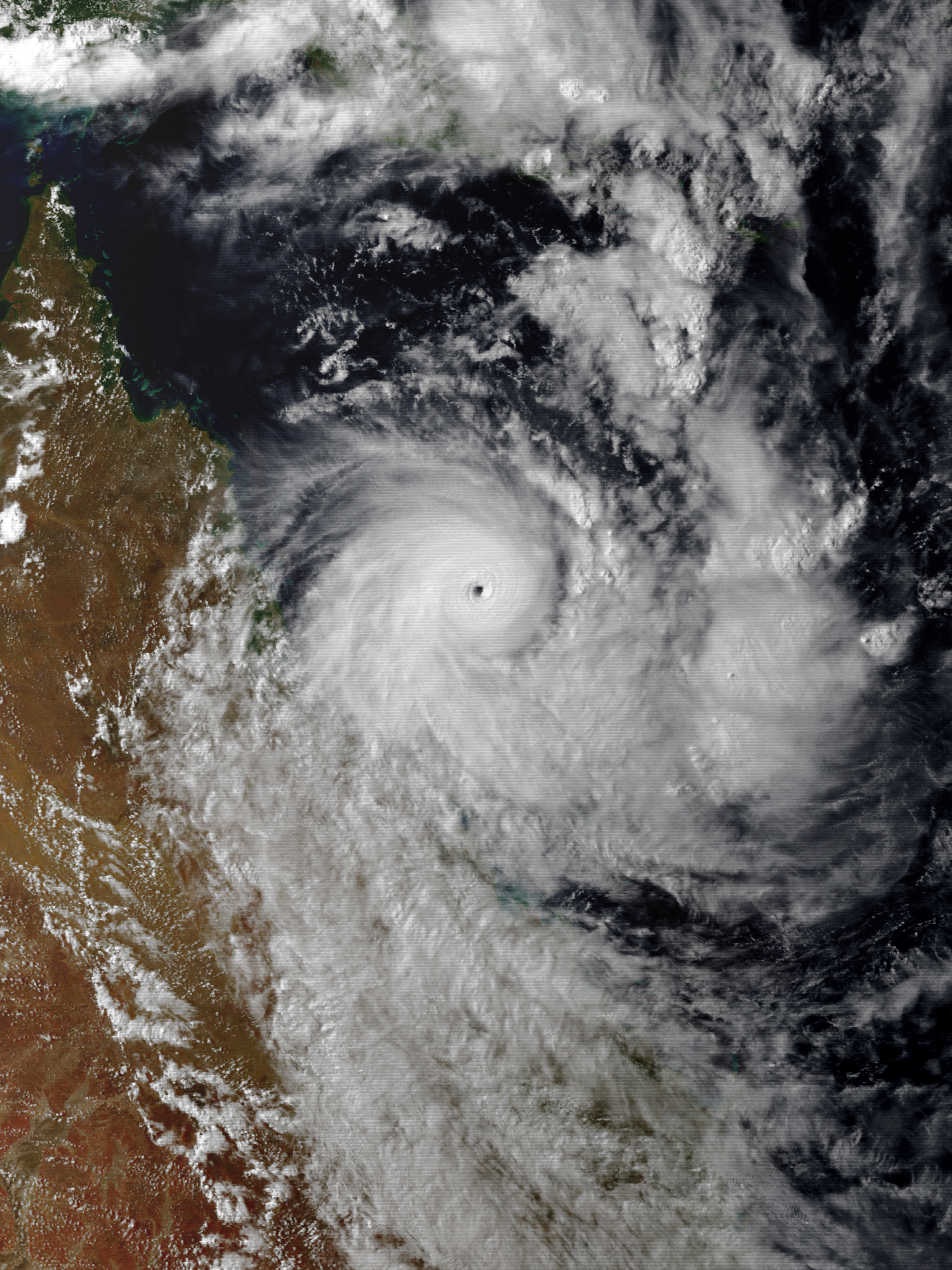
- Cyclone Aivu at peak intensity on 3 April

Meteorological history
- Formed: 31 March 1989
- Dissipated: 5 April 1989

Category 5 severe tropical cyclone
- 10-minute sustained (BOM)
- Highest winds: 205 km/h (125 mph)
- Lowest pressure: 935 hPa (mbar); 27.61 inHg

Category 4-equivalent tropical cyclone
- 1-minute sustained (SSHWS/JTWC)
- Highest winds: 220 km/h (140 mph)
- Lowest pressure: 922 hPa (mbar); 27.23 inHg

Overall effects
- Fatalities: 3 total
- Damage: $156 million (1989 USD)
- Areas affected: Papua New Guinea, Queensland, New South Wales
- Part of the 1988–89 Australian region cyclone season

Severe Tropical Cyclone Aivu was a powerful late-season tropical cyclone that caused extensive damage across parts of Queensland, Australia in April 1989. The tenth named storm of the 1988–89 Australian region cyclone season, Aivu originated from a disturbed area of weather that developed near the Solomon Islands on 29 March. The disturbance tracked westward before turning south-southeast, and it was classified as a tropical cyclone and named Aivu on 1 April. Continuing to move to the south-southeast, the cyclone began to rapidly intensify on 2–3 April, signified by the development of an eye. Aivu peaked as a Category 5 severe tropical cyclone on 3 April as it neared Queensland. The storm then weakened some before making landfall between Home Hill and Inkerman at 03:00 UTC. Aivu weakened rapidly as it tracked inland, dissipating by 5 April.

As Aivu tracked through the eastern islands of Papua New Guinea, it brought heavy rains and caused major flooding. It then brought destructive winds, storm surge, and torrential upon landfall in Queensland. Orographic lift-enhanced rainfall along the Clarke Range led to an exceptional 1,082 millimetres (42.6 in) of rain recorded in Dalrymple Heights. Heavy rains triggered landslides near Eungella, isolating the town for weeks. Floodwaters swelled several rivers in Queensland, with the most severe taking place along the Pioneer River. Six sugar mills were severely damaged or destroyed, and crops in Queensland and New South Wales suffered severe losses. Aivu killed a total of three people—one in Queensland and two in New South Wales—and caused A$200 million in damages.

== Meteorological history ==
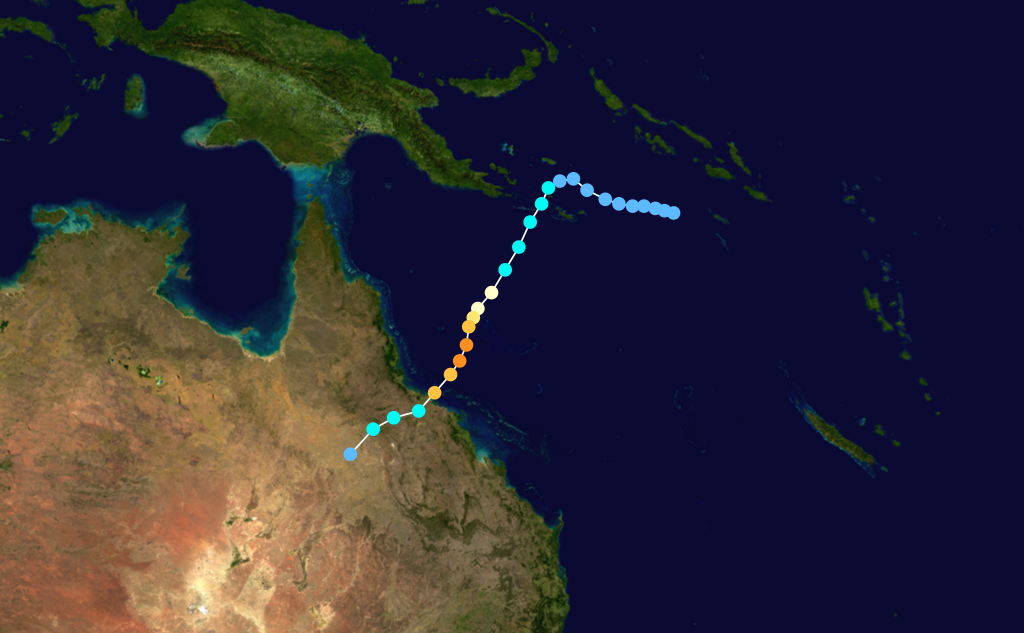
Map plotting the storm's track and intensity, according to the Saffir–Simpson scale Map key Saffir–Simpson scale Tropical depression (≤38 mph, ≤62 km/h) Tropical storm (39–73 mph, 63–118 km/h) Category 1 (74–95 mph, 119–153 km/h) Category 2 (96–110 mph, 154–177 km/h) Category 3 (111–129 mph, 178–208 km/h) Category 4 (130–156 mph, 209–251 km/h) Category 5 (≥157 mph, ≥252 km/h) Unknown Storm type Tropical cyclone Subtropical cyclone Extratropical cyclone, remnant low, tropical disturbance, or monsoon depression

On 29 March 1989, a tropical disturbance developed near the Solomon Islands. Tracking slowly west-northwest, it eventually moved over the Louisiade Archipelago off the southeast tip of Papua New Guinea by 31 March. By this time, it was classified as a tropical low by the Tropical Cyclone Warning Center in Port Moresby. The low subsequently turned south-southeast and intensified into a tropical cyclone on 1 April. Upon reaching cyclone strength, the storm was assigned the name Aivu. Concurrently, the Joint Typhoon Warning Center (JTWC) classified Aivu as Tropical Cyclone 23P, also estimating winds to have reached gale-force. Tropical cyclone formation within Port Moresby's area of responsibility (AOR) is relatively uncommon, though usually linked with cool La Niña events. However, Aivu's late-season formation within the region proved to be an unusual case with no fully understood reason. Moving across the Coral Sea at 15 to 20 km/h (9.3 to 12.4 mph) the storm soon crossed 12°S and entered the Bureau of Meteorology's (BOM) AOR.

Rapid intensification ensued on 2–3 April, with Aivu becoming a severe tropical cyclone — the Australian-equivalent of a hurricane on the Saffir–Simpson hurricane scale. Though obscured by high-level clouds, an eye likely developed during the overnight of 2 April before becoming well-defined the following day. Early on 3 April, the cyclone attained its peak strength with winds of 205 km/h (125 mph) and a barometric pressure of 935 mbar (hPa; 27.61 inHg). This ranked it as a Category 5 severe tropical cyclone—the highest classification on the Australian intensity scale. The estimate stemmed from the Dvorak technique — a method of analysing a tropical cyclone's intensity using satellite imagery — as values reached T#6.5. Around this time, the JTWC estimated Aivu to have become a Category 4-equivalent cyclone, with one-minute sustained winds of 220 km/h (140 mph). A temporary slowing of forward motion occurred during the intensification phase but was followed by even faster motion than before, with the storm approaching Queensland, Australia at 30 km/h (19 mph).

Some weakening took place as it neared the coast. The cyclone's small eye expanded from 22 km (14 mi) to 34 km (21 mi) as it neared the coast. Aivu ultimately made landfall between Home Hill and Inkerman at 0300 UTC (1:00 p.m. AEST) with a pressure of 957 mbar (hPa; 28.26 inHg). Shortly thereafter, the storm passed over Ayr where a sea level-corrected pressure of 962 mbar (hPa; 28.41 inHg) was measured. The JTWC estimated one-minute sustained winds to have been 185 km/h (115 mph) at this time. In Fredricksfield, a pressure of 959 mb (hPa; 28.32 inHg) was measured in the cyclone's eye about 10 km (6.2 mi) from the center of circulation. Rapid weakening ensued as Aivu moved inland; the JTWC estimated winds to have dropped to 100 km/h (65 mph) within six hours of landfall. The storm passed directly over Charters Towers as it turned to the southwest. Degrading to a rain depression, Aivu continued inland and was last noted by the BOM on 5 April well to the northwest of Longreach.

== Preparations ==
The first cyclone watch for residents to prepare for Aivu was issued at 0115 UTC (11:15 a.m. AEST) on 2 April for areas between Townsville and Bowen; this gave residents two days to prepare for the cyclone. Regular advisories in the subsequent 48 hours highlighted the likely impacts of the storm and in the hours leading up to Aivu's landfall, residents were advised to seek shelter. Less than three hours after the watch, a cyclone warning was raised for areas between Cooktown and the Whitsunday Islands. At 1800 UTC on 3 April (4:00 a.m. AEST 4 April), the BOM warned that Aivu, "[posed] a major threat." Forecasters expected a destructive storm surge to affect areas between Ayr and Shute Harbour and notified residents that these areas would likely be inundated during the storm. This was followed by a statement advising residents between Townsville and Mackay to, "complete preparations quickly and be prepared to seek shelter in a safe place." The Bureau was later praised for the quality of warnings issued to the public.

On 3 April, a leading supermarket in Ayr reported a major increase in daily sales from A$16,000 to A$60,000, indicating that residents were taking appropriate actions to prepare for Aivu.

The Royal Australian Air Force (RAAF) relocated a squadron of fighter jets inland away from the storm.

== Impact ==
Early in the storm's existence, it brought heavy rains to the eastern islands of Papua New Guinea, causing major flooding. Jacob Lemeki, a member of the National Parliament, and several others went missing after two vessels disappeared in the storm near the Louisiade Archipelago.

=== Queensland ===
A powerful storm, hurricane-force winds with gusts up to 200 km/h (120 mph) are believed to have impacted areas that experienced the eyewall along the immediate coast. No reliable measurements were available for the area and the highest recorded wind, 118 km/h (73 mph), was well-offshore at Holmes Reef the day before landfall. In addition to destructive winds, the storm produced a large storm surge along Upstart Bay, estimated between 2.5 and 3 m (8.2 and 9.8 ft), that caused severe coastal damage. The highest observed surge was 1.2 m (3.9 ft) in Bowen roughly 100 km (62 mi) southeast of the landfall location.

The cyclone dropped torrential rains across portions of Queensland, namely south of the storm's center. These areas experienced moist, convergent flow with gale-force winds in advance of the cyclone's landfall prolonging the rain-event. While many areas received more than 200 mm (7.9 in), orographic lift along the Clarke Range about 30 km (19 mi) inland greatly enhanced rainfall totals. Exceptionally heavy rains fell west of Mackay with a maximum of 1,082 mm (42.6 in) recorded in Dalrymple Heights (located 200 km (120 mi) south of Aivu's track). The rains in Dalrymple Heights had an average return interval (ARI) of roughly 100 years, though 24-hour accumulations were well in excess of this. Ayr, where Aivu's eye made landfall, experienced a peak hourly rainfall of 71 mm (2.8 in), though this was considered normal for fast moving, intense cyclones. A 24-hour rainfall, with an ARI of 100 years, of 215 mm (8.5 in) was measured in Longreach. Across west-central Queensland, the remnants of Aivu dropped torrential rains along a narrow strip spanning only a few kilometres across. More than 500 mm (20 in) in Whitehill while areas nearby only received 50 mm (2.0 in). In 24 hours, the station recorded more than two years' worth of rain and multiple gauges had to be used due to overflow. Many areas experienced record-high rainfall totals for the month of April due to Aivu.

The heavy rains caused moderate to severe flooding along several rivers in the state. The most significant flooding took place along the Pioneer River, which crested at 12.2 m (40 ft) at Mirani. This was the third-highest value in 30 years. In Mackay, the swollen river rose to 7.8 m (26 ft). The Proserpine River also reached major flood levels while moderate flooding occurred on the Don and Burdekin rivers. Water levels reached 10 m (33 ft) at Inkerman Bridge along the Burdekin River. Heavy rains across the Fitzroy River basin flowed into the Connors and Issac Rivers and the Funnel Creek catchments. Funnel Creek crested at 6 m (20 ft) in Rockhampton on 15 April. The remnants of Aivu triggered additional flooding along the Barcoo, Bulloo, Paroo, and Thomson rivers.

Severe damage to power lines left many areas without electricity, most notably Burdekin where repairs were expected to take up to two weeks.

Six sugar mills in the path of the storm were severely damaged or destroyed by Aivu. Roughly 20 percent of the national sugar crop was lost in the storm. Alongside flooding in the days preceding the cyclone, nearly 80 percent of cotton and virtually all vegetable crops in Queensland and New South Wales were damaged or destroyed. Roughly 30 percent of the 300,000 mango trees affected by the storm were damaged, with many stripped bare of their fruit-bearing branches. The worst effects were felt in Burdekin where trees were uprooted and/or defoliated. For the second time in just over a year, the Endeavour Foundation in Home Hill lost nearly its entire crop to a cyclone. Only 130,000 of the 750,000 planted capsicum and eggplant seeds were recovered, with losses reaching A$300,000.

Throughout Queensland, damage from Aivu amounted to A$200 million (1997 AUD; US$156 million). Of this total, at least A$25–26 million of the damage was insured (normalised value of A$138 million) while A$12–15 million was uninsured or underinsured. One person was killed and thirteen others were injured.

=== New South Wales ===
Prior to Cyclone Aivu, widespread flooding affected much of New South Wales with some rivers reaching their highest levels since 1974. Though southern areas of the state began to dry out as Aivu moved inland, the cyclone exacerbated conditions in northern areas, with rainfall reaching 400 mm (16 in) in some areas. Caravan parks along the Queanbeyan and Murrumbidgee rivers had to be evacuated. The Murrumbidgee River in particular was expected to crest at near-record heights, prompting additional evacuations at farms.

More than 700 mm (28 in) of rain fell in Eungella along the Queensland border, triggering massive landslides that cut off all roads to the town. The main road to Eungella was severely impacted and expected to be blocked for several weeks. Several vehicles, including a train and bus, were also stranded in the area. Multiple bridge wash outs further isolated areas. Floodwaters also cut off the small town of Coraki from surrounding areas. Throughout the state, flooding was responsible for two fatalities.

== Aftermath ==
Immediately following Aivu's landfall, a state of emergency was declared for parts of Queensland. The severity of damage in the Shire of Burdekin prompted a local and federal emergency declaration for the area. In response, 140 personnel from Delta Company of the Australian Army were dispatched as Defense Aid to the Civil Community by the afternoon of 4 April. They set up an emergency headquarters at the Ayr racecouse and assisted with cleanup operations in Ayr itself and Home Hill. Delta Company's operation was complete by 7 April, with 98 percent of damaged homes having tarpaulins placed on their roof. A handful of engineers and liaison officers from the company stayed behind for additional inspections.

On 7 April, a Cessna aircraft carrying five people crashed in the remote Cravens Peak cattle station near the Queensland–Northern Territory border. Though not caused by the cyclone, a woman on the plane was flying due to a lack of hospital access resulting from floods caused by Aivu. Meanwhile, in Eungella, New South Wales, food, water, and medical supplies had to be airlifted by a RAAF Bell UH-1 Iroquois helicopter because it was inaccessible by ground.

On 11 April, an appeal for aid was made for farmers in the Burdekin and Gympie regions; only authorities and associated organisations were allowed to contribute. The Department of Primary Industries monitored all crops affected by the storm for signs of a Sclerotinia outbreak and preemptively sprayed them to prevent the disease. Across the state, 3,500 insurance claims were made by 12 April, with this total expected to reach 9,000. Clean up and restoration efforts cost approximately A$10 million (US$8.4 million) throughout Queensland.

Following an assessment of the BOM's warning performance during Cyclone Aivu, in which they received praise from most, a new scale for tropical cyclone intensities was to be implemented starting with the 1989–90 cyclone season. This five-level scale was designed to better inform the public of the degree of danger storms posed.

== See also ==
- 1988–89 Australian region cyclone season
- List of retired Australian cyclone names
- Cyclone Winifred (1986)
- Cyclone Charlie (1988)
