= Pterostylis anatona =

Eungella greenhood

Scientific classification
- Kingdom: Plantae
- Clade: Tracheophytes
- Clade: Angiosperms
- Clade: Monocots
- Order: Asparagales
- Family: Orchidaceae
- Subfamily: Orchidoideae
- Tribe: Cranichideae
- Genus: Pterostylis
- Species: P. anatona

Binomial name
- Pterostylis anatona D.L.Jones

Species of orchid

Pterostylis anatona, commonly known as the Eungella greenhood, is a species of orchid endemic to Queensland. It has a rosette of wrinkled leaves at the base of the plant and a single light green and white flower, reddish towards its tip. It grows in higher areas between Eungella and the Blackdown Tableland National Park.

== Description ==
Pterostylis anatona is a terrestrial, perennial, deciduous, herb with an underground tuber and a rosette of dark green, wrinkled leaves 15–45 mm (0.6–2 in) long and 9–18 mm (0.4–0.7 in) wide. A single light green and white flower 37–44 mm (1–2 in) long and 15–20 mm (0.6–0.8 in) wide with a reddish-brown tip is borne on a spike 60–180 mm (2–7 in) high. The dorsal sepal and petals are fused, forming a hood or "galea" over the column. The dorsal sepal is slightly shorter than the petals. There is a wide gap between the galea and the lateral sepals. The lateral sepals are erect and have narrow tips 20–25 mm (0.8–1 in) long and a bulging V-shaped sinus between them. The labellum is 18–22 mm (0.7–0.9 in) long, about 4 mm (0.2 in) wide, reddish-brown and curved and protrudes above the sinus. Flowering occurs from June to August.

== Taxonomy and naming ==
Pterostylis anatona was first formally described in 1997 by David Jones and the description was published in The Orchadian from a specimen collected near Eungella. The specific epithet (anatona) is a Latin word meaning "stretching or extending upward".

== Distribution and habitat ==
The Eungella greenhood grows in forest with a grassy understorey above 800 m (3,000 ft) between Eungella and the Blackdown Tableland.
