= Crediton, Queensland =

Crediton
- Suburb
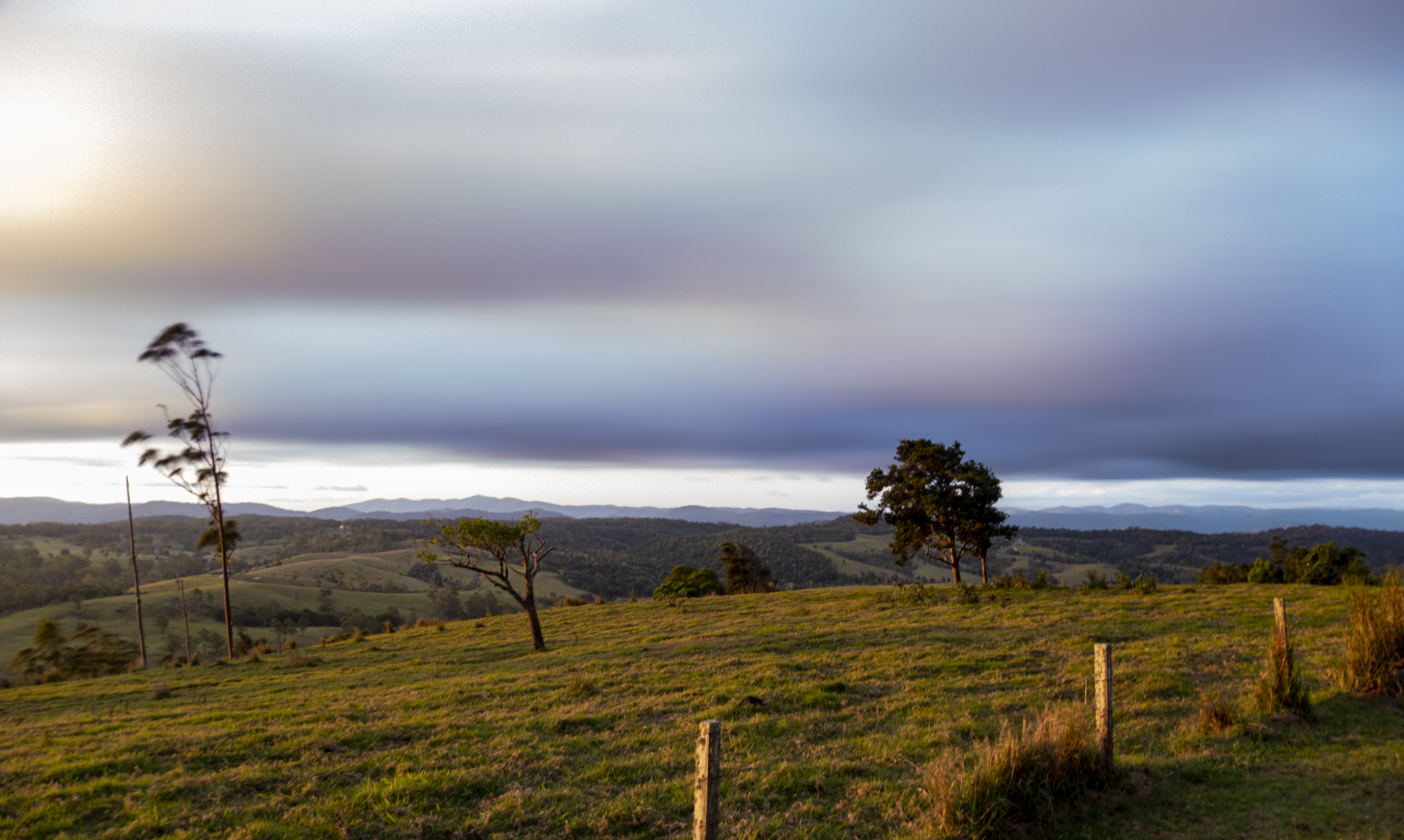
- Crediton in November 2020

- Interactive map of Crediton
- Coordinates: 21.2688°S 148.5469°E
- Country: Australia
- State: Queensland
- LGA: Mackay Region
- Location: 15.2 km (9.4 mi) SE of Eungella; 58.5 km (36.4 mi) W of Mirani; 96.4 km (59.9 mi) W of Mackay; 1,039 km (646 mi) NNW of Brisbane

Government
  - State electorate: Mirani
  - Federal division: Capricornia

Area
  - Total: 308.2 km^{2} (119.0 sq mi)

Population
  - Total: 109 (2021 census)
  - Density: 0.3537/km^{2} (0.916/sq mi)
- Time zone: UTC+10:00 (AEST)
- Postcode: 4757
Suburbs around Crediton
Eungella; Broken River	Netherdale	Finch Hatton
Eungella Dam	Crediton	Pinnacle
Mount Britton	Mount Britton	Septimus

Crediton is a rural locality in the Mackay Region, Queensland, Australia. In the 2021 census, Crediton had a population of 109 people.

== Geography ==
The ridge of the Denham Range forms the south-west boundary of the locality, while the Clarke Range (part of the Great Dividing Range) forms the north-west boundary and then extends from north to south through the locality. The terrain is mountainous and has number of named peaks:

- Mount Bruce (21.2222°S 148.5119°E) at 950 metres (3,120 ft) above sea level
- Mount St John (21.2597°S 148.4947°E) at 885 metres (2,904 ft) above sea level
- Dingo Mountain (21.2736°S 148.4711°E) at 740 metres (2,430 ft) above sea level
- Diamond Cliffs (21.3666°S 148.5666°E) at 880 metres (2,890 ft) above sea level

Most of the locality is within protected areas with Eungella National Park in the north, Crediton Forest Reserve in the north-west and north-east and Crediton State Forest in the south. This leaves only a small area of freehold land in the north of the locality which is predominantly used for grazing on native vegetation.

Lonely Valley is a neighbourhood (21.1833°S 148.6°E).

The Bogle Bathing Pool is a waterhole (21.1714°S 148.5278°E).

The Wishing Pool is a waterhole (21.1833°S 148.55°E).

== History ==
In November 1936 a group of local residents decided that Crediton should have a school and a hall and decided to levy all the residents £1 each towards the cost of erecting a building to initially serve both purposes. However, the building was not built and on 18 October 1943 the Crediton Provisional School opened in a building provided by Edmund Dean Ross. The Crediton Hall was built in 1947 in the area now known as East Crediton and the school transferred into the hall. In 1956 it became Crediton State School and moved into a new building on land adjacent to the hall. The school closed in 1968.

In 1950, the residents of West Crediton began to lobby for a school in their area. Although 3 miles (4.8 km) from the school in East Crediton, the road between the two areas was dangerous with steep drops on either side and impassable in wet weather. Local residents obtained a 17-acre (6.9 ha) for the school. Crediton West State School opened on 30 July 1951 in a privately owned building, while negotiations with the Queensland Government continued to build a permanent school. It closed in 1961.

The Crediton branch of the Queensland Country Women's Association was formed on 15 July 1964 with an initial membership of 13. It closed in 1976 when its membership fell below 5.

== Demographics ==
In the 2016 census, Crediton had a population of 82 people.

In the 2021 census, Crediton had a population of 109 people.

== Education ==
There are no schools in Crediton. The nearest government primary school is Eungella State School in neighbouring Eungella to the north-west. The nearest government secondary school is Mirani State High School in Mirani to the north-east.

== Amenities ==
Crediton Hall is a community centre at 671 Crediton Loop Road (21.2060°S 148.5463°E).

== Attractions ==
Palms Lookout (21.1644°S 148.5317°E) and Catherines Lookout (21.1619°S 148.5233°E) are tourist attractions.
