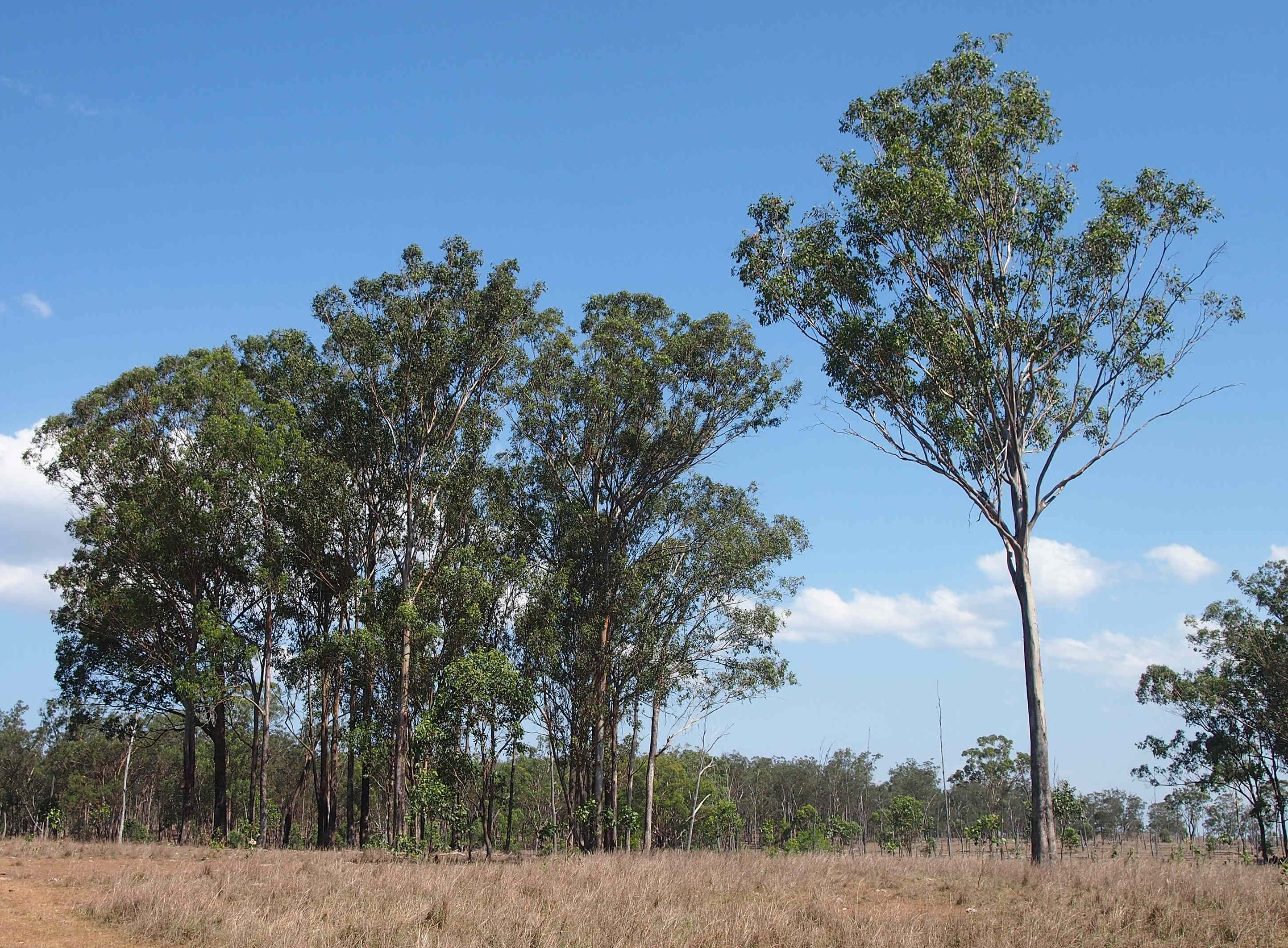

Conservation status
- Vulnerable (IUCN 3.1)

Scientific classification
- Kingdom: Plantae
- Clade: Tracheophytes
- Clade: Angiosperms
- Clade: Eudicots
- Clade: Rosids
- Order: Myrtales
- Family: Myrtaceae
- Genus: Eucalyptus
- Species: E. moluccana

Binomial name
- Eucalyptus moluccana Roxb.
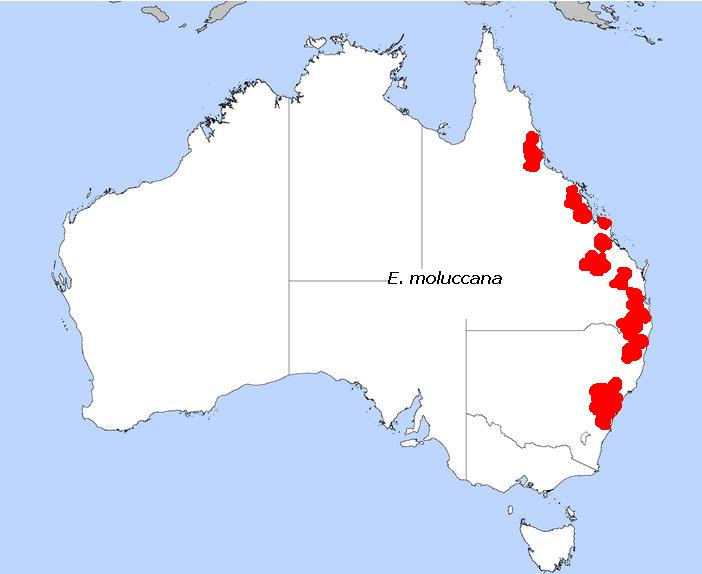
- E. moluccana, field distribution

Synonyms
- Eucalyptus hemiphloia F.Muell. ex Benth.; Eucalyptus hemiphloia F.Muell. ex Benth. var. hemiphloia; Eucalyptus moluccana subsp. crassifolia Gillison nom. inval., nom. nud.; Eucalyptus moluccana subsp. pedicellata Gillison nom. inval., nom. nud.; Eucalyptus moluccana subsp. queenslandica Gillison

= Eucalyptus moluccana =

Grey box

Species of eucalyptus

Eucalyptus moluccana, commonly known as the grey box, gum-topped box or terriyergro, is a medium-sized to tall tree with rough bark on part or all of the trunk, smooth bark above, lance-shaped adult leaves, flower buds usually in groups of seven, white flowers and cup-shaped to barrel-shaped fruit. It is found in near-coastal areas of Queensland and New South Wales.

== Description ==
Eucalyptus moluccana is a tree that typically grows to a height of 30 m (98 ft) and forms a lignotuber. It has persistent rough, fibrous or flaky bark on part or all of the trunk, smooth whitish or light grey bark above, sometimes with a shiny surface. Young plants and coppice regrowth have egg-shaped leaves that are paler on the lower surface, 40–80 mm (1.6–3.1 in) long, 25–55 mm (0.98–2.17 in) wide and petiolate. Adult leaves are lance-shaped to broadly lance-shaped, the same glossy green on both sides, 70–170 mm (2.8–6.7 in) long and 15–65 mm (0.59–2.56 in) wide on a petiole 10–25 mm (0.39–0.98 in) long and with many oil glands. The flower buds are arranged on the ends of branchlets in groups of usually seven, on a branched peduncle 6–13 mm (0.24–0.51 in) wide, the individual buds on pedicels 2–5 mm (0.079–0.197 in) long. The buds are spindle-shaped to diamond-shaped, 4–8 mm (0.16–0.31 in) long and 2–4 mm (0.079–0.157 in) wide with a conical operculum. Flowering has been recorded in most months and the flowers are white. The fruit is a woody cup-shaped to barrel-shaped capsule 4–7 mm (0.16–0.28 in) long and 3–6 mm (0.12–0.24 in) wide with the valves enclosed.

== Taxonomy and naming ==
Eucalyptus moluccana was first formally described in 1832 by William Roxburgh in his Flora Indica; or descriptions of Indian Plants. The specific epithet refers to the Moluccas, islands of Southeast Asia but is a misnomer. The Dharawal people know this species as terriyergro.

== Distribution and habitat ==
Grey box is widespread on the coastal plains and ranges northwards from Jervis Bay in New South Wales to the area between Rockhampton and Mackay in Queensland. Further north there is a substantial gap, with occurrences in the ranges from west of Paluma to the southern part of the Atherton Tableland and two small disjunct patches east of Clermont near Eungella Dam.

Features of the gum-topped box (Eucalyptus moluccana)

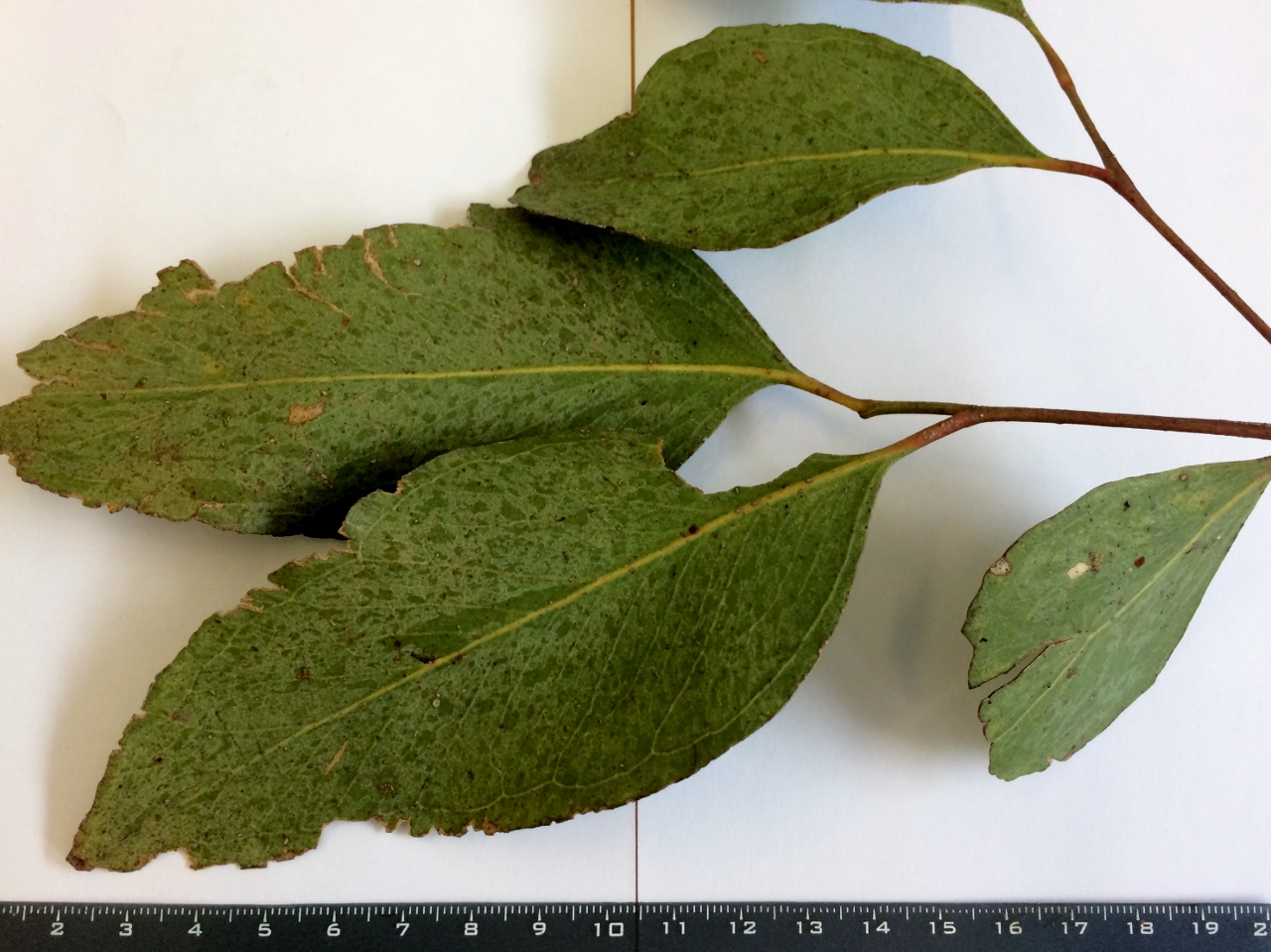
Leaves

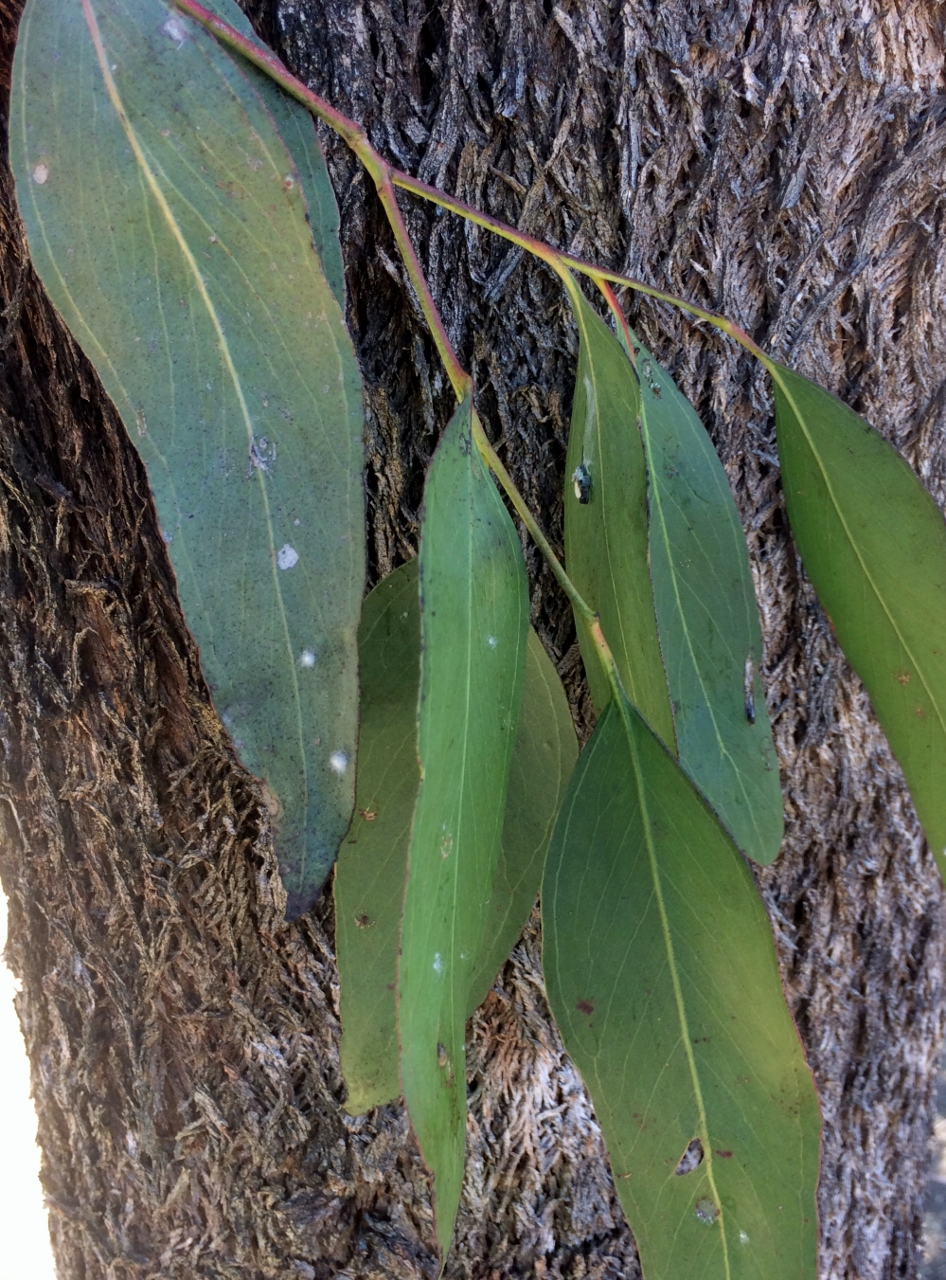
Bark and leaves

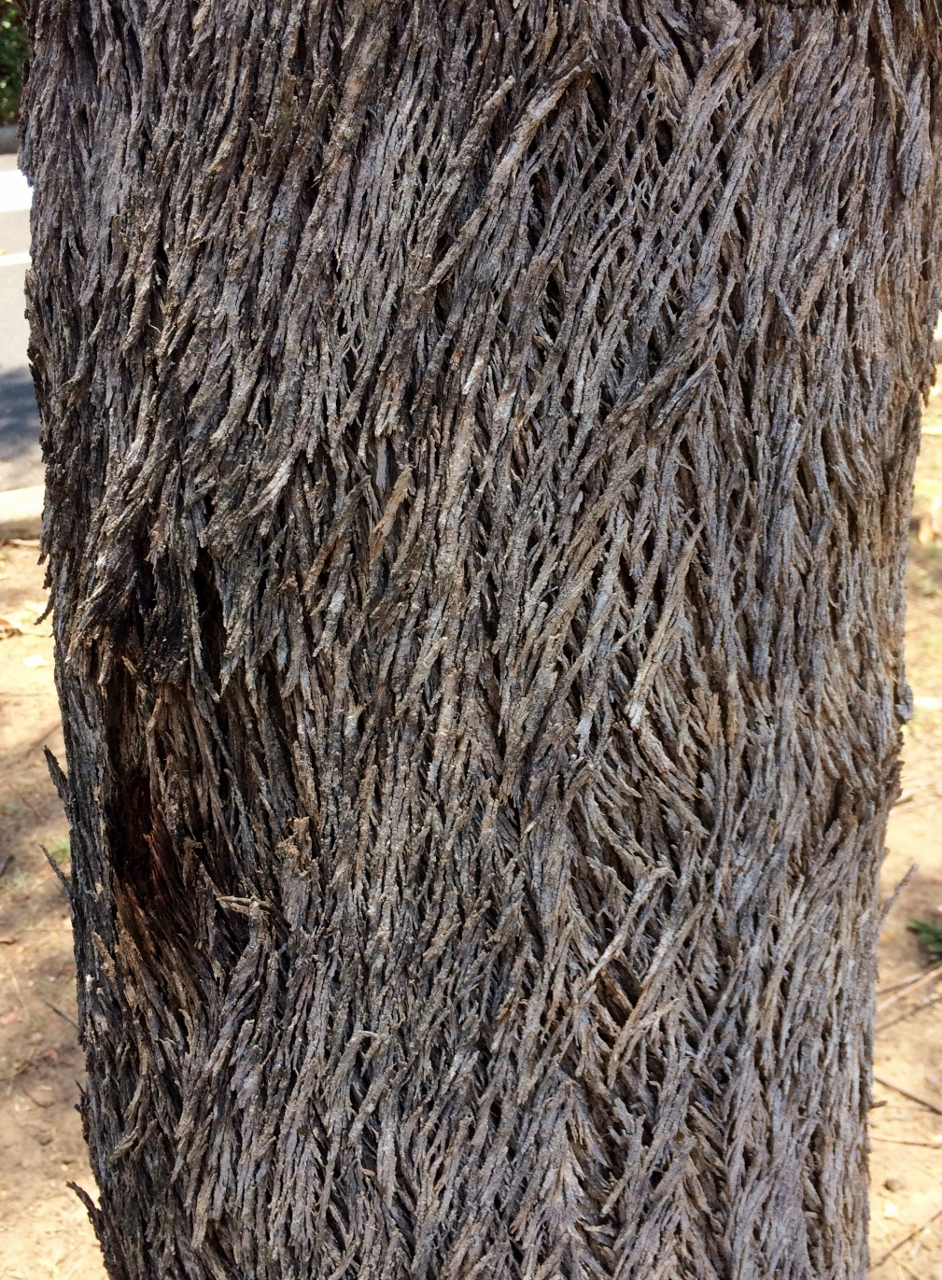
Trunk bark

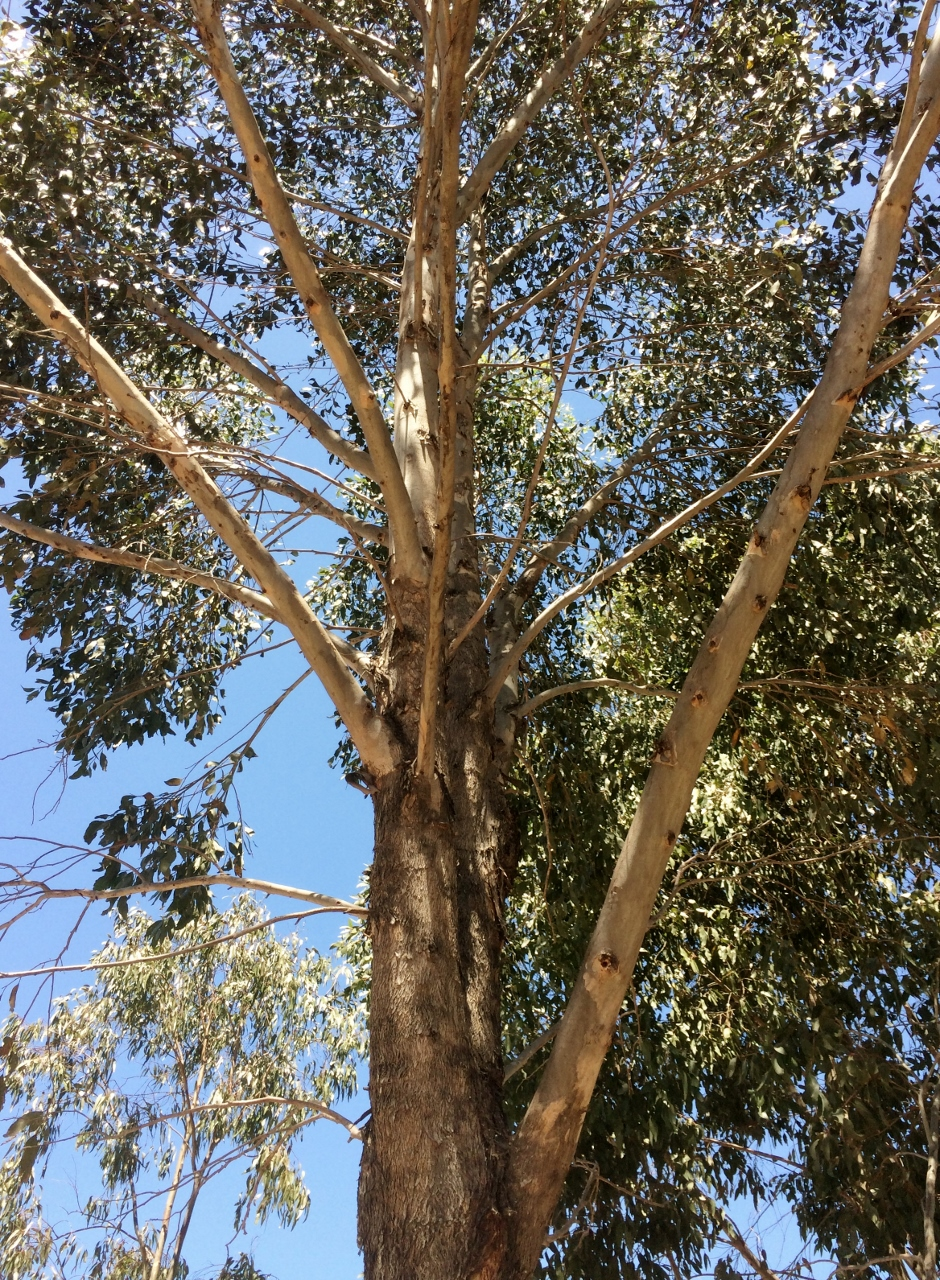
Upper branch bark

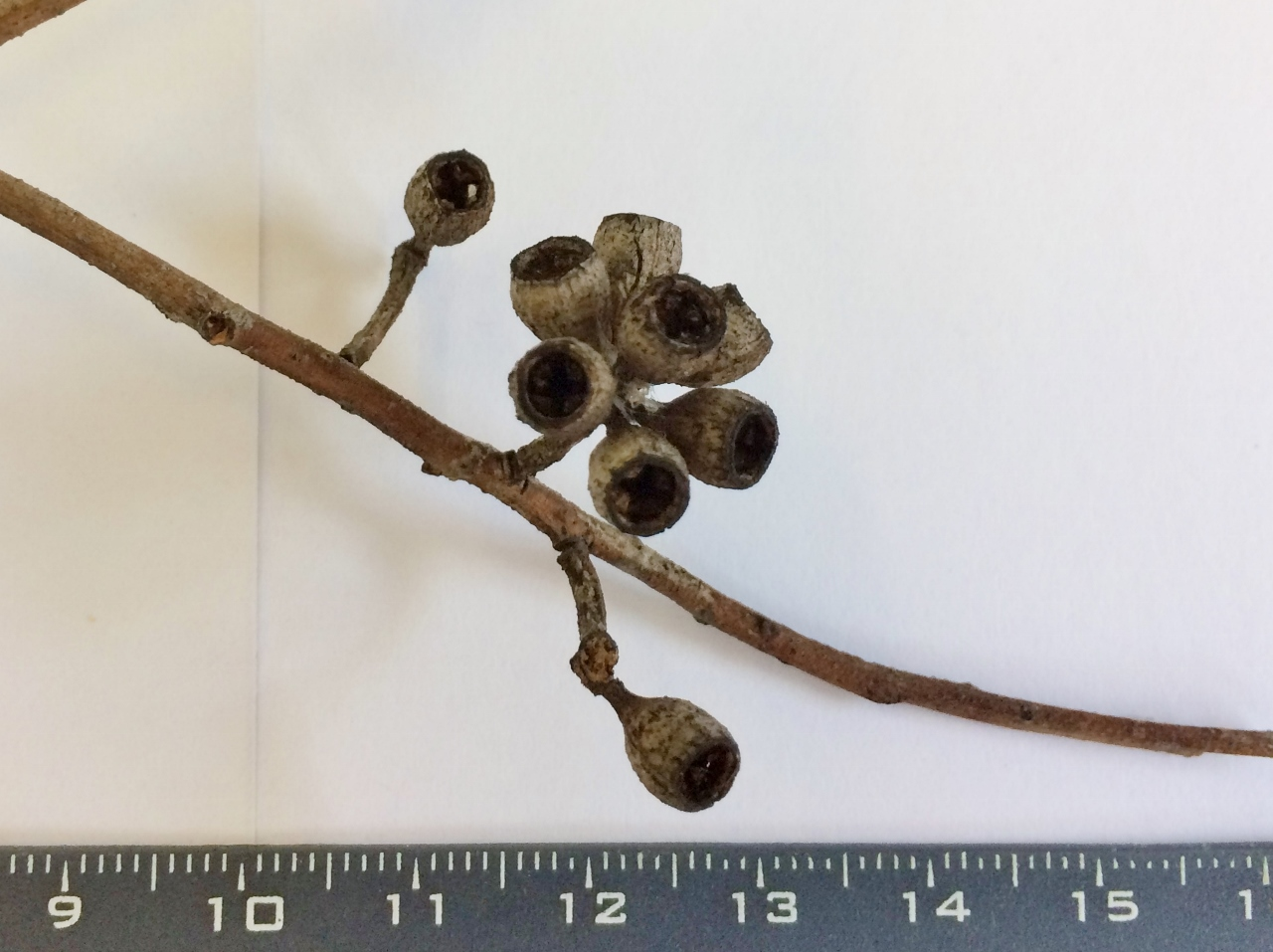
Fruit
