= Pterostylis anaclasta =

Scientific classification
- Kingdom: Plantae
- Clade: Tracheophytes
- Clade: Angiosperms
- Clade: Monocots
- Order: Asparagales
- Family: Orchidaceae
- Subfamily: Orchidoideae
- Tribe: Cranichideae
- Genus: Pterostylis
- Species: P. anaclasta

Binomial name
- Pterostylis anaclasta (D.L.Jones) Janes & Duretto

Synonyms
- Oligochaetochilus anaclastus D.L.Jones

Species of orchid

Pterostylis anaclasta is a species of flowering plant in the orchid family Orchidaceae and is endemic to a restricted part of Queensland. It has a rosette of about 6 sessile leaves and about 4 transparent white flowers with bright reddish lines and markings, a reddish brown labellum with white hairs, and lateral sepals strongly turned backwards.

== Description ==
Pterostylis anaclasta is a terrestrial, perennial, deciduous, herb with an underground tuber. It has a rosette of between about 6, sessile oblong to elliptic leaves at the base of the flowering spike, each leaf 10–15 mm (0.39–0.59 in) long and 5–15 mm (0.20–0.59 in) wide. About 4 transparent white flowers with bright reddish lines and markings are more on a flowering spike about 140 mm (5.5 in) high, each flower on a thin pedicel 3–8 mm (0.12–0.31 in) long. The dorsal sepal and petals form a hood or "galea" over the column with the dorsal sepal. The dorsal sepal is about 20 mm (0.79 in) long, including a thread-like tip about 7 mm (0.28 in) long. The lateral sepals turn downwards and strongly backwards about 8 mm (0.31 in) long and 11 mm (0.43 in) wide with thread-like tips about 12 mm (0.47 in) long. The petals are egg-shaped, about 15 mm (0.59 in) long and 5 mm (0.20 in) wide. The labellum is reddish-brown, insect-like, about 6.5 mm (0.26 in) long, 3.8 mm (0.15 in) wide and has white bristles around its edges. Flowering has been observed in September.

== Taxonomy ==
This orchid was first formally described in 2010 by David Jones who gave it the name Oligochaetochilus anaclastus in the journal The Orchadian from plants grown at the Australian National Botanic Gardens from a cutting collected near Eungella Dam. In the same year, Jasmine Janes and Marco Duretto changed the name to Pterostylis anaclasta in Australian Systematic Botany. The specific epithet (anaclastus) means bent backwards, referring to the lateral sepals.

== Distribution and habitat ==
Pterostylis anaclasta is only known from the type location near Eungella Dam where it grows on rocky outcrops in open forest.
