= Netherdale (disambiguation) =

Netherdale is a sports ground in Galashiels, Scotland.

Netherdale may also refer to

- Netherdale, an obsolete name of Nidderdale, a valley in Yorkshire, England
- Netherdale, an area of Galashiels, Scotland
- Netherdale, Queensland, a locality in Queensland, Australia
