= Eungella Hinterland, Queensland =

Eungella Hinterland
- Suburb
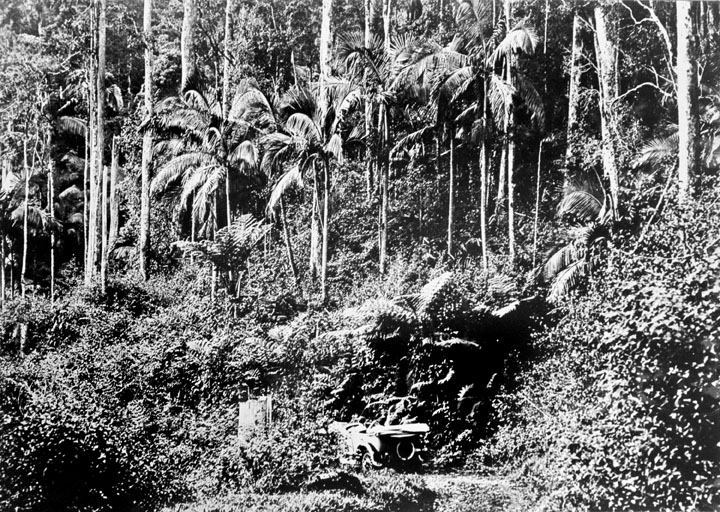
- Eungella Range, circa 1931

- Interactive map of Eungella Hinterland
- Coordinates: 20.9225°S 148.4225°E
- Country: Australia
- State: Queensland
- LGA: Mackay Region
- Location: 48.2 km (30.0 mi) NW of Eungella; 129 km (80 mi) WNW of Mackay; 1,100 km (680 mi) NNW of Brisbane

Government
  - State electorates: Burdekin; Whitsunday; Mirani
  - Federal divisions: Capricornia; Dawson

Area
  - Total: 1,306.2 km^{2} (504.3 sq mi)

Population
  - Total: 0 (2021 census)
  - Density: 0.0000/km^{2} (0.0000/sq mi)
- Time zone: UTC+10:00 (AEST)
- Postcode: 4741
Suburbs around Eungella Hinterland
Bogie	Bogie	Bloomsbury; Calen
Newlands	Eungella Hinterland	Yalboroo; Mount Charlton
Turrawulla; Eungella Dam	Dalrymple Heights	Finch Hatton; Owens Creek; Dows Creek

Eungella Hinterland is a rural locality in the Mackay Region, Queensland, Australia. In the 2021 census, Eungella Hinterland had "no people or a very low population".

== Geography ==
Eungella Hinterland is mountainous undeveloped terrain with individual peaks including (from north to south):

- Mount Macartney (20.8310°S 148.5550°E) 972 metres (3,189 ft)
- Mount Cauley (20.9099°S 148.3336°E) 625 metres (2,051 ft)
- Mount Margaret (20.9134°S 148.6399°E) 664 metres (2,178 ft)
- Mount Lilian (20.9137°S 148.6805°E) 569 metres (1,867 ft)
- Mount Consuelo (20.9177°S 148.6681°E) 377 metres (1,237 ft)
- Mount Omega (21.0157°S 148.6732°E) 815 metres (2,674 ft)
- Mount William (21.0166°S 148.5985°E) 1,259 metres (4,131 ft)
- Mount David (21.0172°S 148.6262°E) 1,249 metres (4,098 ft)
- Mount Dalrymple (21.0280°S 148.6406°E) 1,260 metres (4,130 ft)

The eastern half of the locality is a protected area, including the Macartney State Forest, Eungella National Park, Pelion Forest Reserve and Pelion State Forest.

== History ==
The locality takes its name from the town and pastoral run name, which in turn was named in July 1876 by explorer Ernest Favenc in July 1876. It is believed to be an Aboriginal word, meaning land of cloud.

== Demographics ==
In the 2016 census, Eungella Hinterland had "no people or a very low population".

In the 2021 census, Eungella Hinterland had "no people or a very low population".

== Education ==
There are no schools in Eungella Hinterland. The nearest government primary schools are Eungella State School in Eungella to the south and Pindi Pindi State School in Pindi Pindi to the north-east. The nearest government secondary school is Calen District State College in neighbouring Calen to the north-east. However, due to the size of the locality, some areas may be too distant to attend these schools with distance education and boarding schools being the alternatives.
