= Finch Hatton, Queensland =

Finch Hatton
- Town
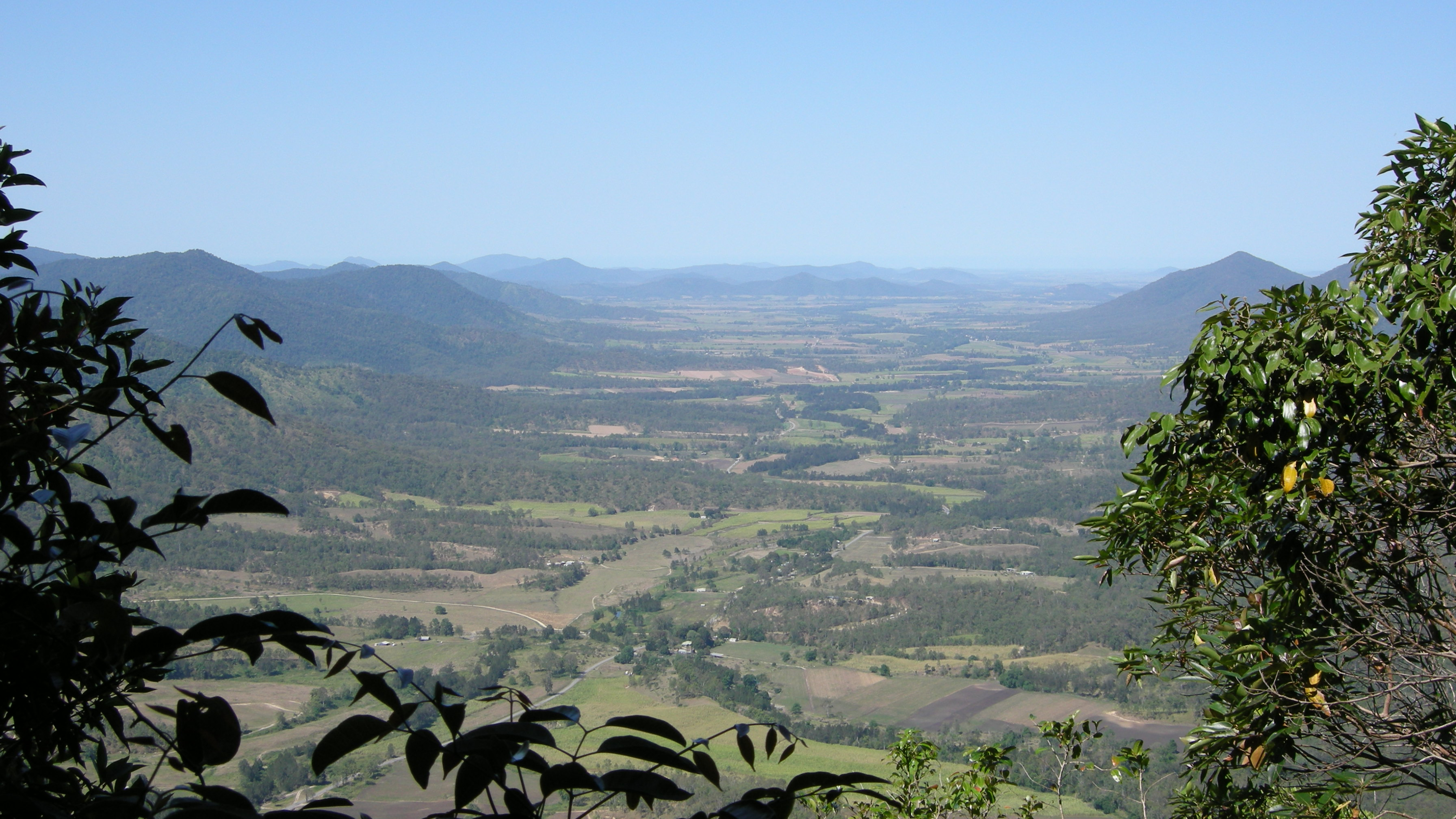
- The locality occupies part of the Cattle Creek valley (background)

- Interactive map of Finch Hatton
- Coordinates: 21.1402°S 148.6330°E
- Country: Australia
- State: Queensland
- LGA: Mackay Region
- Location: 26.4 km (16.4 mi) W of Mirani; 63.5 km (39.5 mi) W of Mackay; 390 km (240 mi) NNW of Rockhampton; 1,004 km (624 mi) NNW of Brisbane

Government
  - State electorate: Mirani
  - Federal division: Capricornia

Area
  - Total: 147.9 km^{2} (57.1 sq mi)

Population
  - Total: 531 (2021 census)
  - Density: 3.590/km^{2} (9.299/sq mi)
- Time zone: UTC+10:00 (AEST)
- Postcode: 4756
Localities around Finch Hatton
Dalrymple Heights	Eungella Hinterland	Eungella Hinterland
Netherdale	Finch Hatton	Owens Creek
Crediton	Pinnacle	Pinnacle

Finch Hatton is a rural town and locality in the Mackay Region, Queensland, Australia. In the 2021 census, the locality of Finch Hatton had a population of 531 people.

== Geography ==
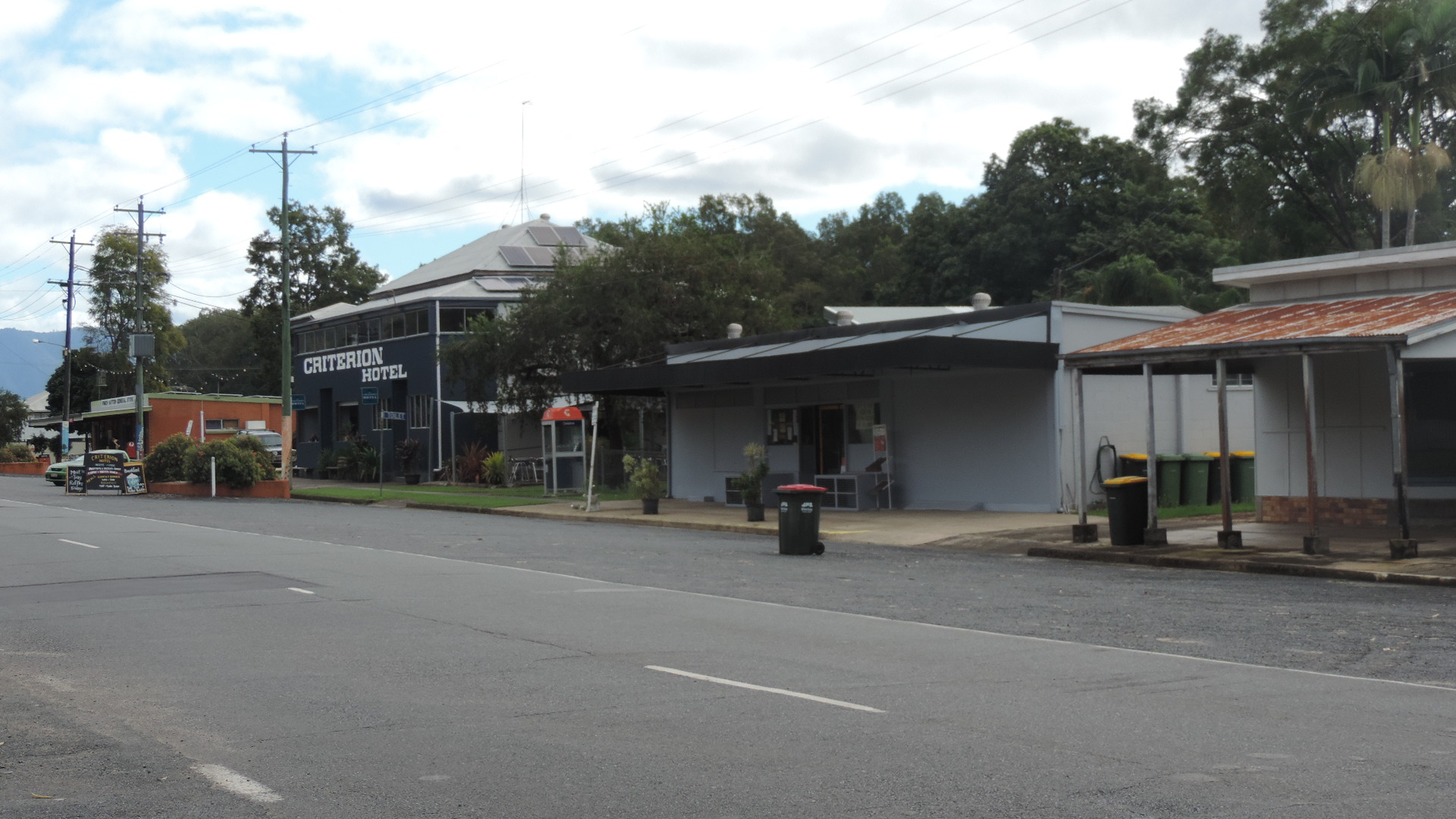
Main street, 2016

Finch Hatton lies in the valley of Cattle Creek (a tributary of the Pioneer River) which flows from west to east through the locality. Although the centre of the locality beside the creek is at 100 metres above sea level, the northern and southern parts of the locality are mountainous rising to 970 metres in the north and 870 metres in the south.

The valley contains the town, roughly centre of the locality. The Mackay–Eungella Road passes through the valley and the town from west to east, although it is called Anzac Parade within the town.

== History ==
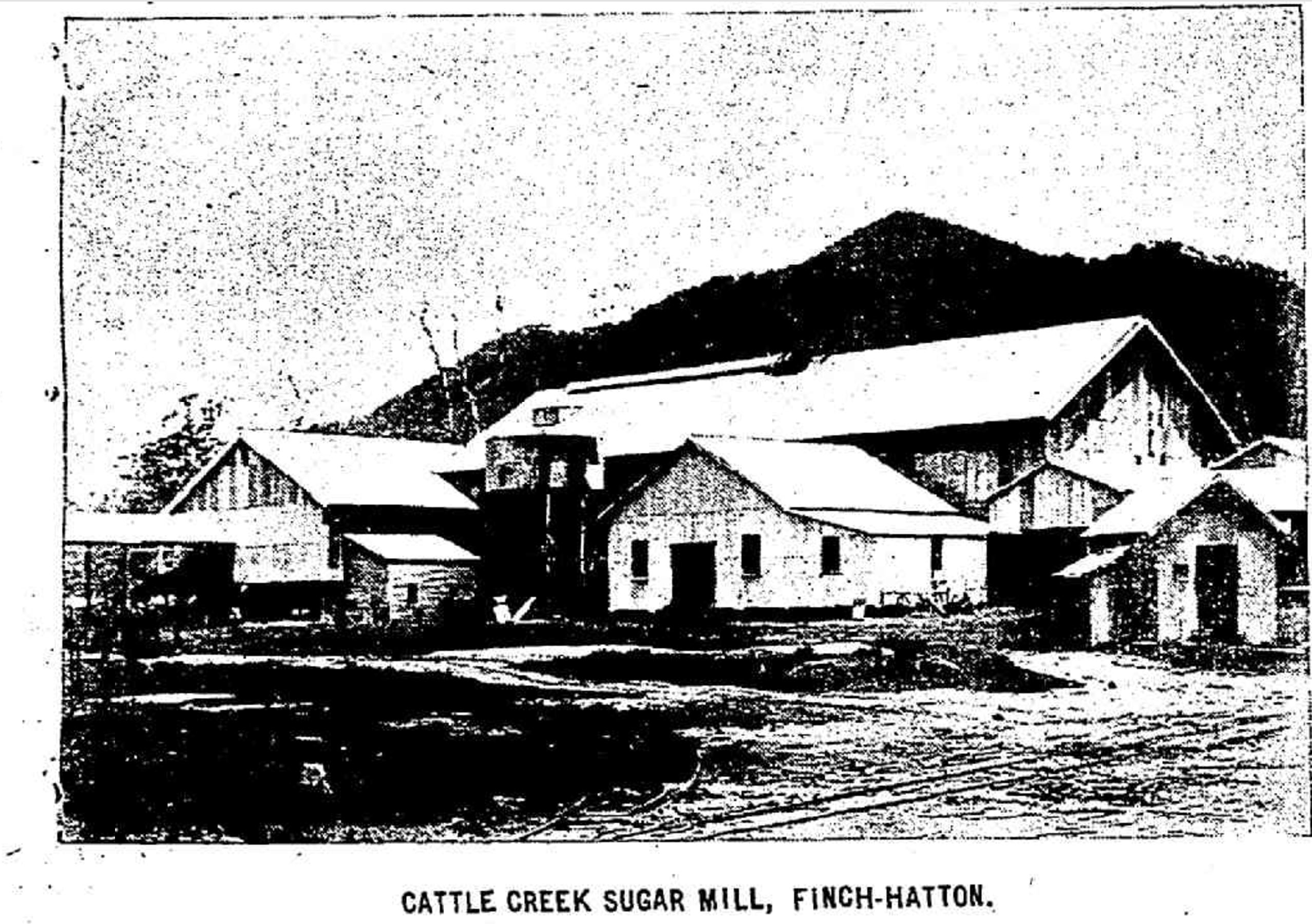
Cattle Creek Sugar Mill, 1913

The town is believed to be named after Hon. Harold Heneage Finch-Hatton (1856–1904), a British aristocrat turn grazier of Mount Spencer run (1881–83), and imperial federationist in United Kingdom (1884–1904). He gave an account of his experiences in the area through his book entitled Advance Australia! This book covers various topics including the sugar industry, cattle grazing, Native Police, Aboriginals, Kanakas and gold mining techniques.

The first settlers were Hermann Wilhelm Zahmel and his wife Adeline Wilhelmina (née Grawunder), who had immigrated from Germany to Queensland in 1872 and 1876 respectively. They married in Mackay in 1877. In 1889 the Zahmels acquired a parcel of land (Portion 1044 in the Parish of Mia Mia) to the west of the present-day town, where they raised a family of nine children.

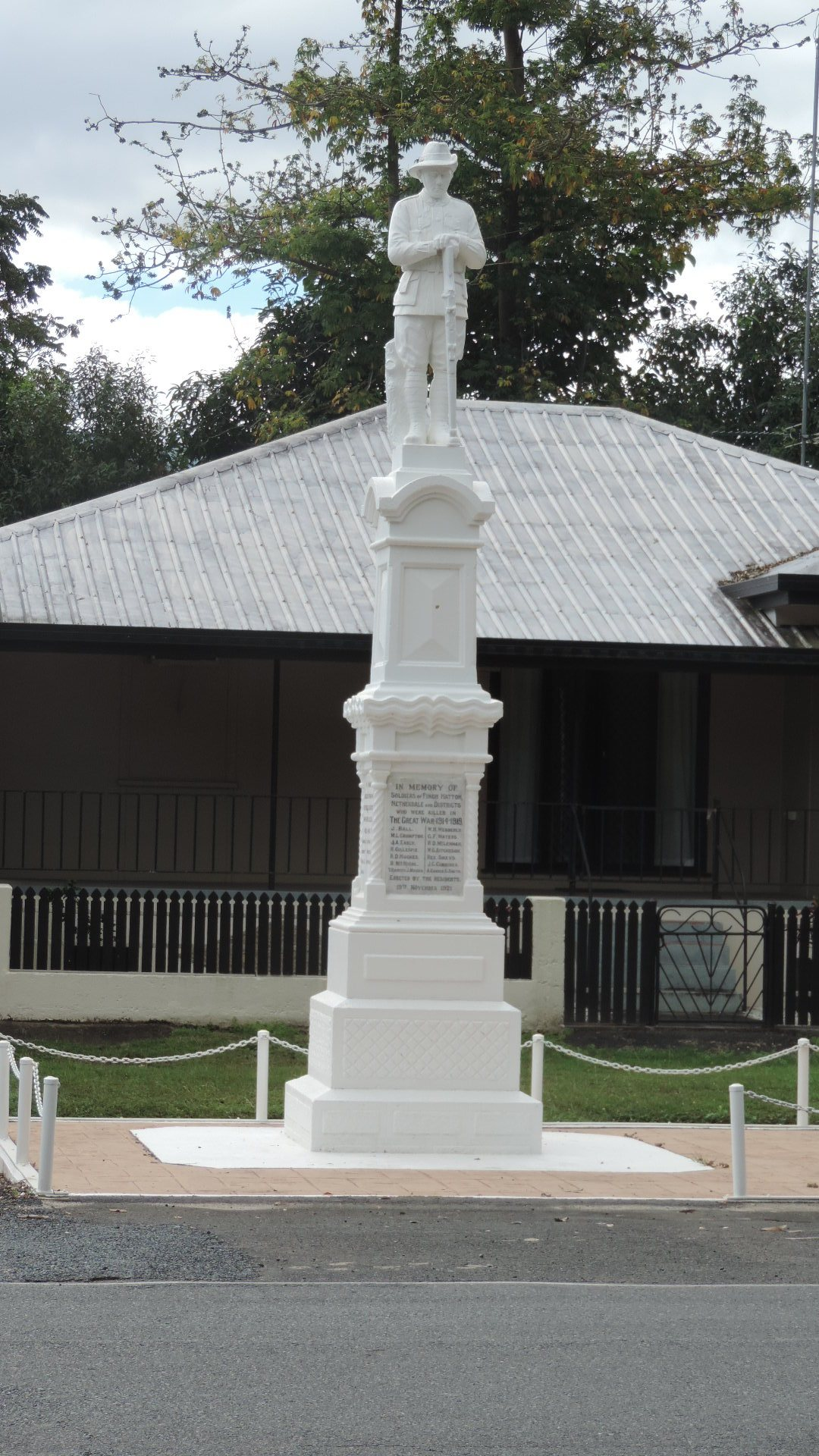
War memorial, 2016

The Cattle Creek Sugar Mill commenced in 1906, closing in 1990. It was located on the south side of Anzac Parade between the railway station and the school (21.1407°S 148.6344°E).

Finch Hatton Post Office opened by December 1906 (replacing a receiving office named Pelion open from December 1895).

Finch Hatton State School opened on 5 July 1909.

The Finch Hatton War Memorial was erected in 1921. It commemorated those servicemen from Finch Hatton and Netherdale who died in World War I. Later an additional plaque was added with the details of those who died in World War II. The memorial is located in Anzac Parade (21.140431°S 148.632073°E).

On 18 February 1958, Mackay was hit with massive flooding caused by heavy rainfall upstream with 878 millimetres (34.6 in) of rain falling at Finch Hatton in 24 hours. The flood peaked at 9.14 metres (29.99 ft). The water flowed down the valley and flooded Mackay within hours. Residents were rescued off rooftops by boats and taken to emergency accommodation. The flood broke Australian records.

== Demographics ==
In the 2016 census, the locality of Finch Hatton had a population of 499 people.

In the 2021 census, the locality of Finch Hatton had a population of 531 people.

== Heritage listings ==
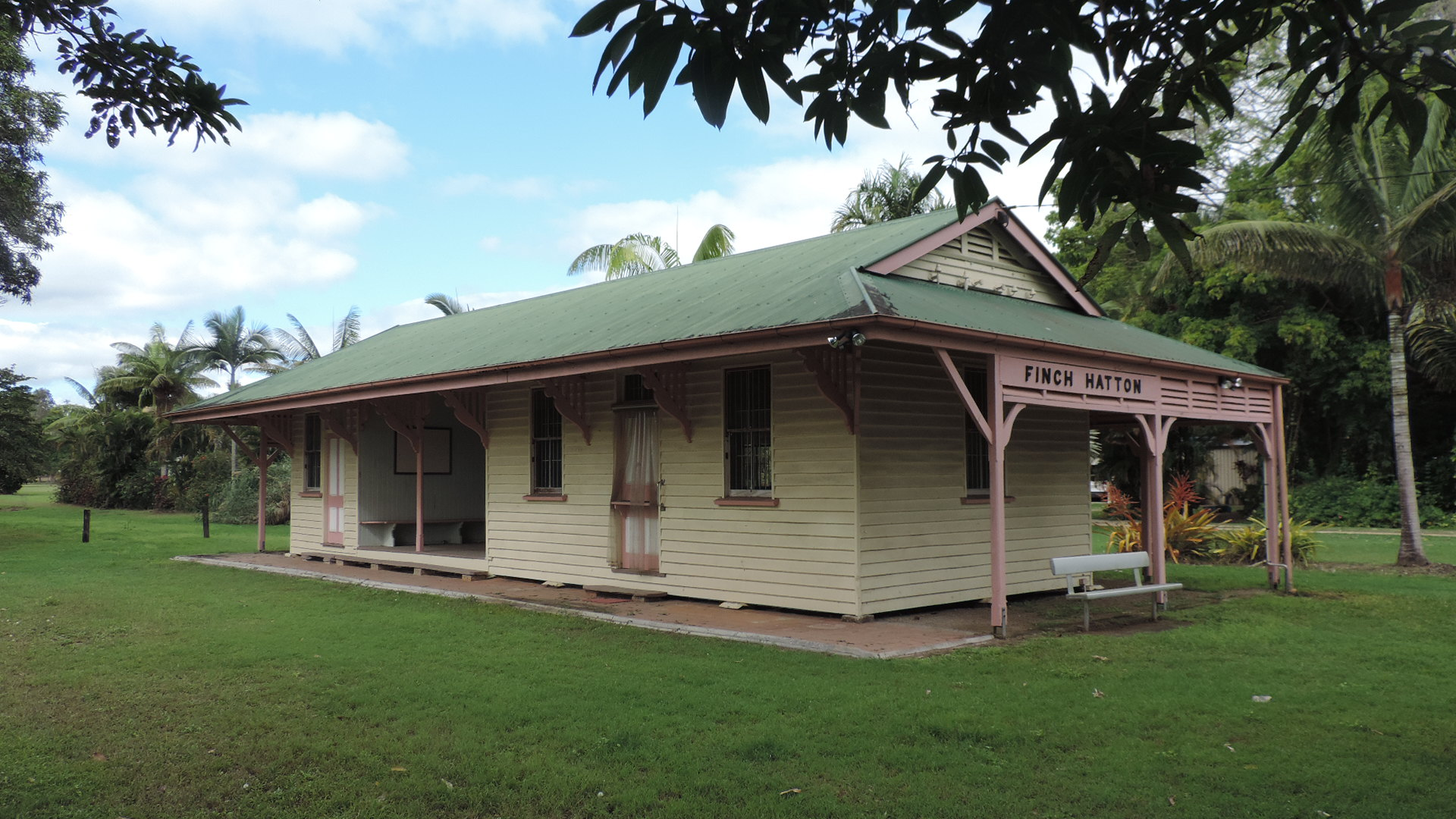
Finch Hatton railway station, 2016

Finch Hatton has a number of heritage-listed sites, including:

- Anzac Parade: Finch Hatton War Memorial
- Mackay–Eungella Road: Finch Hatton railway station

== Education ==
Finch Hatton State School is a co-educational government primary (P–6) school on the Mackay–Eungella Road (21.1396°S 148.6394°E). In 2016, it had an enrolment of 49 students with 8 teachers (5 equivalent full-time) and 7 non-teaching staff (3 equivalent full-time).

There are no secondary schools in Finch Hatton. The nearest government secondary school is Mirani State High School in Mirani to the east.

== Amenities ==
The Mackay Regional Council operates a mobile library service on a fortnightly schedule at the corner of Zahmel Street and Mackay–Eungella Road.

== See also ==
- List of sugar mills in Queensland
- List of tramways in Queensland
