= Dalrymple Heights =

- Suburb
- Interactive map of Dalrymple Heights
- Coordinates: 21.0588°S 148.5077°E
- Country: Australia
- State: Queensland
- LGA: Mackay Region
- Location: 15.3 km (9.5 mi) NE of Eungella; 59.4 km (36.9 mi) WNW of Mirani; 96.5 km (60.0 mi) WNW of Mackay CBD; 1,062 km (660 mi) NNW of Brisbane

Government
  - State electorate: Mirani
  - Federal division: Capricornia

Area
  - Total: 96.1 km^{2} (37.1 sq mi)

Population
  - Total: 46 (2021 census)
  - Density: 0.479/km^{2} (1.240/sq mi)
- Time zone: UTC+10:00 (AEST)
- Postcode: 4757
Suburbs around Dalrymple Heights
Eungella Hinterland	Eungella Hinterland	Eungella Hinterland
Eungella Dam	Dalrymple Heights	Finch Hatton
Eungella	Eungella	Netherdale

Dalrymple Heights is a rural locality in the Mackay Region, Queensland, Australia. In the 2021 census, Dalrymple Heights had a population of 46 people.

== Geography ==
The ridgeline of the Clarke Range forms the eastern boundary of the locality. Immediately west of this is a relatively flat area which is predominantly used for grazing on native vegetation. Most of the locality further west is mountainous and undeveloped and is within the Eungella National Park.

== History ==
The first blocks were offered as dairying selections in 1912.

Dalrymple Heights Provisional School was built by local settlers and opened on 14 June 1937. In 1950 it became Dalrymple Heights State School. It closed on 9 September 1959. It was at 686 Dalrymple Road (21.0983°S 148.5216°E).

On 19 and 20 July 1965, snow fell in the locality, marking the only tropical snowfall location on record in Australia.

== Demographics ==
In the 2016 census, Dalrymple Heights had a population of 44 people.

In the 2021 census, Dalrymple Heights had a population of 46 people.

== Economy ==
Historically, this was a dairying area. However, de-regulation and supermarket purchasing power has increasingly made dairying uneconomic for smaller producers. In the 1980s there were 28 dairy farms in the area, but by 2012 there were only three.

The Dalrymple Heights Australia Post office is the name allocated to the post office in nearby Eungella, and has never been a post office in Dalrymple Heights.

== Education ==
There are no schools in Dalrymple Heights. The nearest government primary school is Eungella State School in neighbouring Eungella to the south. The nearest government secondary school is Mirani State High School in Mirani to the south-east; however, it may be too distant from some parts of Dalrymple Heights for a daily commute. The alternatives are distance education and boarding school.

== Attractions ==
Peases Lookout is a tourist attraction on Dalyrmple Road (21.1146°S 148.5193°E).
