= Eungella Dam, Queensland =

Eungella Dam
- Suburb
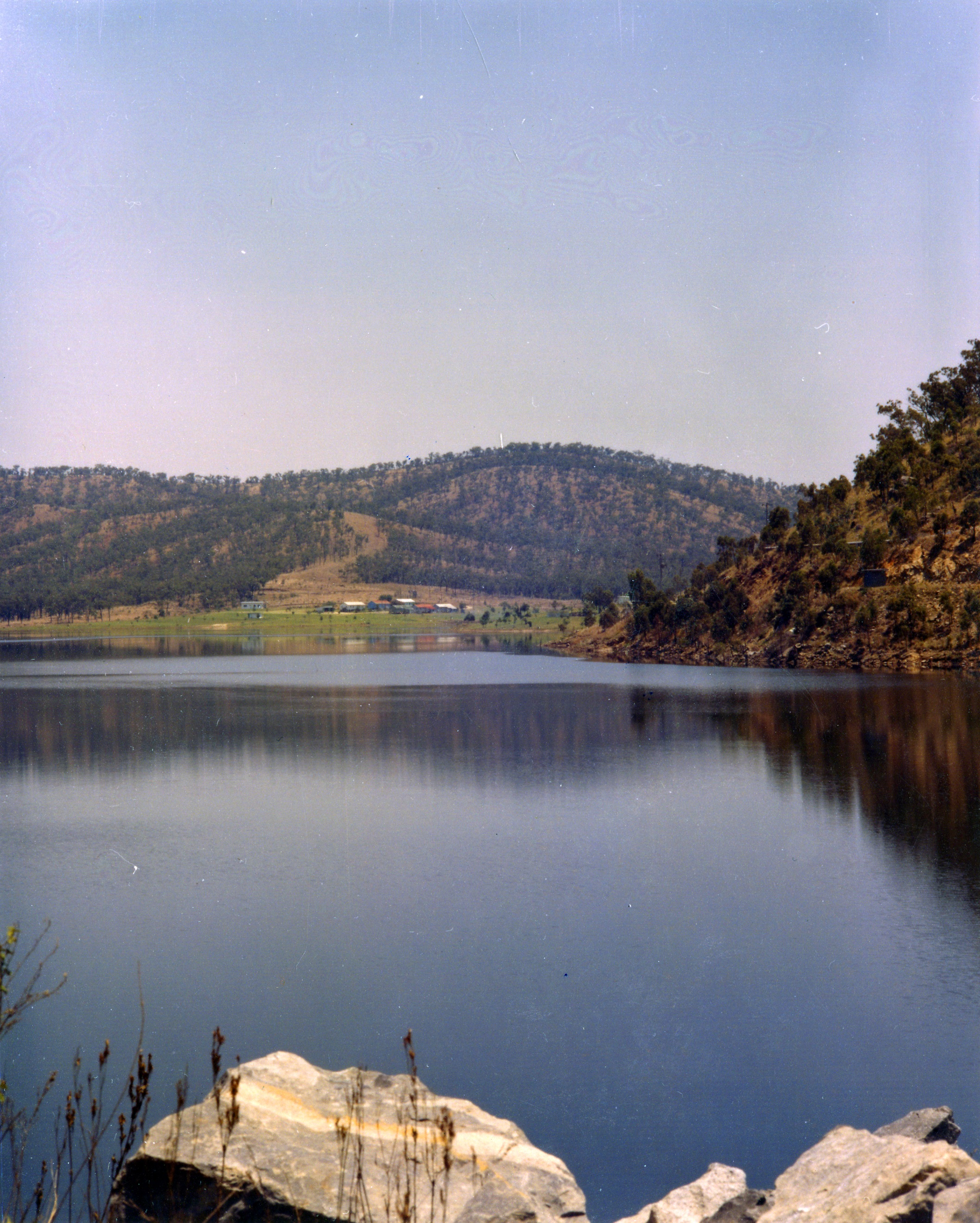
- Lake Eungella, 1974

- Interactive map of Eungella Dam
- Coordinates: 21.1769°S 148.3908°E
- Country: Australia
- State: Queensland
- LGA: Mackay Region
- Location: 26.3 km (16.3 mi) WSW of Eungella; 70.3 km (43.7 mi) W of Mirani; 107 km (66 mi) W of Mackay; 1,063 km (661 mi) NNW of Brisbane

Government
  - State electorates: Mirani; Burdekin
  - Federal division: Capricornia

Area
  - Total: 380.7 km^{2} (147.0 sq mi)

Population
  - Total: 0 (2021 census)
  - Density: 0.0000/km^{2} (0.000/sq mi)
- Time zone: UTC+10:00 (AEST)
- Postcode: 4757
Suburbs around Eungella Dam
Eungella Hinterland	Eungella Hinterland	Dalrymple Heights
Turrawulla	Eungella Dam	Eungella
Hail Creek	Mount Britton	Crediton

Eungella Dam is a locality in the Mackay Region, Queensland, Australia. In the 2021 census, Eungella Dam had "no people or a very low population".

== Geography ==
The terrain is undeveloped mountains with elevations ranging from 300 to 950 metres (980 to 3,120 ft) with one named peak Mount Tooth 700 metres (2,300 ft).

The Eungella Dam (21.13667°S 148.38889°E) is in the centre of the locality at elevation 550 metres (1,800 ft). It creates Lake Eungella (21.1666°S 148.4°E). It receives inflows from Broken River and other creeks.

The land to the west of the dam is protected as Crediton Forest Reserve and Crediton State Forest.

The land use in the rest of the locality is grazing on native vegetation.

== History ==
The locality takes its name from the dam, which in turn takes its name from the town and pastoral run name, which in turn was named in July 1876 by explorer Ernest Favenc in July 1876. It is believed to be an Aboriginal word, meaning land of cloud.

Eungella Dam took four years to build, with an official opening on 14 February 1969. It inundated a cattle station owned by the McEvoy family, but their homestead was relocated.

== Demographics ==
In the 2016 census, Eungella Dam had a population of 12 people.

In the 2021 census, Eungella Dam had "no people or a very low population".

== Education ==
There are no schools in Eungella Dam. The nearest government primary school is Eungella State School in neighbouring Eungella to the east. The nearest government secondary school is Mirani State High School in Mirani to the east; however, some parts of Eungella Dam would be too distant for a daily commute to Mirani so the alternatives are distance education and boarding school.

== Amenities ==
There is a boat ramp on Eungella Dam Road (21.1466°S 148.3869°E). It is managed by the SunWater.
