= Mount Dalrymple (Queensland) =

Mountain in Queensland, Australia

- Location within Queensland

Highest point
- Elevation: 1,227 m (4,026 ft); AHD
- Parent peak: Mount William
- Coordinates: 21°01′31″S 148°38′17″E

Naming
- Etymology: George Elphinstone Dalrymple

Geography
- Location: Central Queensland, Australia
- Parent range: Clarke Range

Mount Dalrymple is a mountain in the Clarke Range, part of the Great Dividing Range, located in Central Queensland, Australia. The mountain has an elevation of 1,227 metres (4,026 ft) AHD. It is amongst the higher peaks in Queensland and is located 858 kilometres (533 mi) northwest of Brisbane, and 50 kilometres (31 mi) west of Mackay. The peak and surrounding ranges are covered in dense tropical rainforest and forms part of the Eungella National Park.

It was named after George Elphinstone Dalrymple, an early European explorer of north Queensland.

== See also ==
- List of mountains in Queensland
