= Eungella, Queensland =

Eungella
- Town
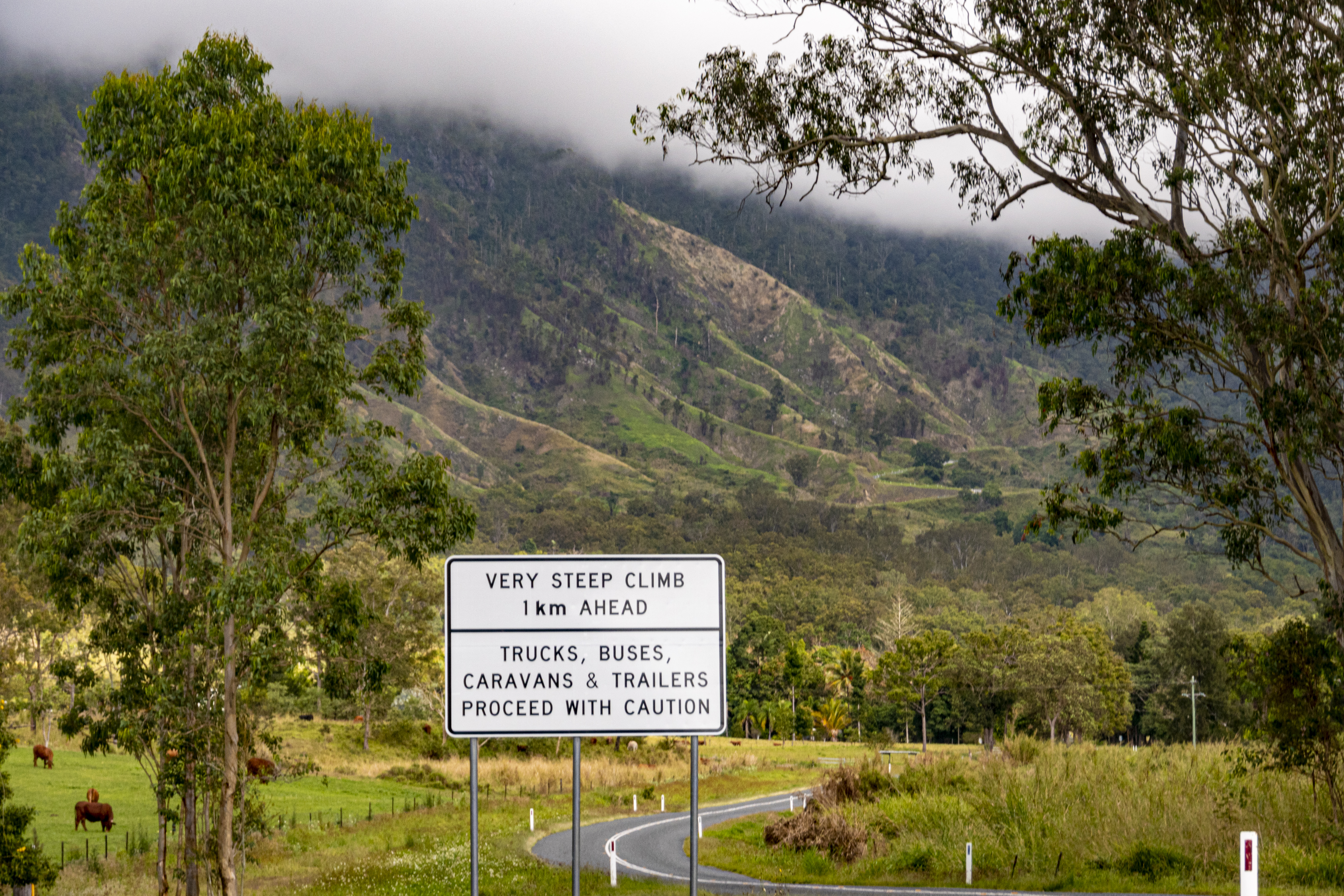
- Eungella, Queensland, Australia, in the clouds at the top of the range, 2021

- Interactive map of Eungella
- Coordinates: 21.1305°S 148.4922°E
- Country: Australia
- State: Queensland
- LGA: Mackay Region
- Location: 46.4 km (28.8 mi) W of Mirani; 82.4 km (51.2 mi) W of Mackay; 1,037 km (644 mi) NNW of Brisbane

Government
  - State electorate: Mirani
  - Federal division: Capricornia

Area
  - Total: 42.4 km^{2} (16.4 sq mi)
- Elevation: 690 m (2,260 ft)

Population
  - Total: 190 (2021 census)
  - Density: 4.48/km^{2} (11.6/sq mi)
- Time zone: UTC+10:00 (AEST)
- Postcode: 4757
Localities around Eungella
Eungella Dam	Dalrymple Heights	Dalrymple Heights
Eungella Dam	Eungella	Netherdale
Eungella Dam	Crediton	Broken River

Eungella is a rural town and locality in the Mackay Region, Queensland, Australia. In the 2021 census, the locality of Eungella had a population of 190 people.

== Geography ==
The town of Eungella sits at the top of the escarpment of the Clarke Range at 690 metres (2,260 ft) above sea level, falling to an elevation of 200 metres (660 ft) in Netherdale to the immediate east. The southern branch of Cattle Creek forms on this escarpment and creates the fertile valley to the east, where it becomes a tributary of the Pioneer River in Mirani, which eventually flows into the Coral Sea at Mackay.

The escarpment and several other parts of the locality are within the Eungella National Park, which extends into the neighbouring localities of Netherdale and Broken River and beyond. In the west and south of the locality are parts of the Crediton Forest Reserve which extends into the neighbouring localities of Crediton and Eungella Dam. There is also a section of the Crediton State Forest within the locality with another section in Crediton.

Due to the mountainous terrain and the protected areas, there is limited development of the land in the locality. Apart from residential use, the remaining land use is for grazing on native vegetation.

== History ==
The town takes its name from a pastoral run named by explorer and pioneer Ernest Favenc in July 1876. The name is believed to be an Aboriginal word meaning land of cloud.

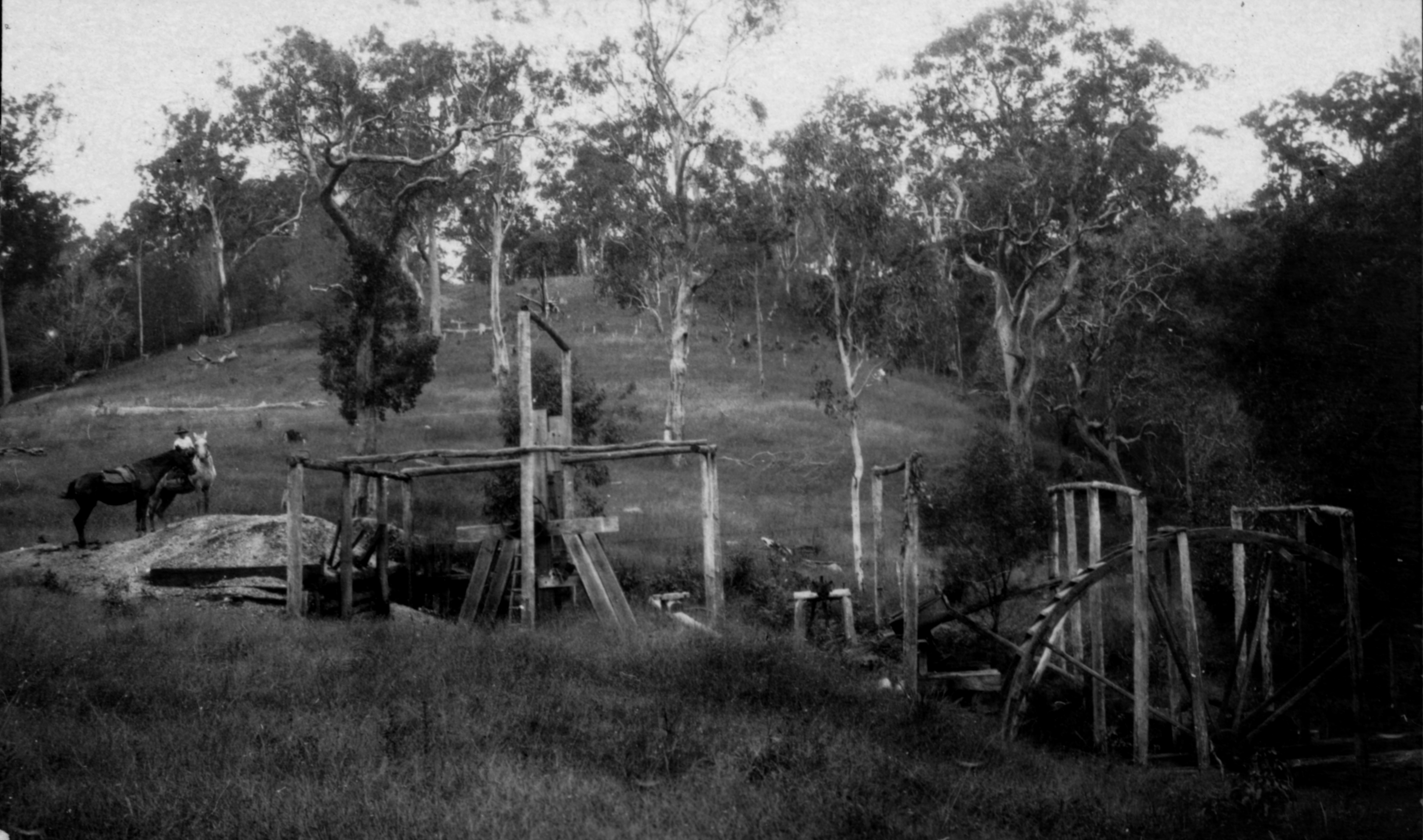
Old Eungella water wheel driven battery at Broken River gold mines, Queensland, Australia, 1927

The locality was within the proclaimed boundaries of the Eungella Goldfield at the end of the 1800s and early 1900s. Access to the area was by a pack horse track or by a road via Nebo and Mount Britton. The Eungella Range Road opened in 1909. However damage had been incurred within twelve months, and repairs and a deviation instigated. In 1923 the first car traveled on the Eungella Range in wet slippery conditions, and resorted to tying a heavy sapling behind the car to steady the car. Landslips continue to be an issue following heavy rain.

Eungella Provisional School opened circa 1891, but closed circa 1899.

On 31 January 1928, another Eungella Provisional School was opened and later became Eungella State School.

The Eungella Post Office was opened in 1930, but had to change its name due to another post office with the same name in New South Wales. After twelve months of community consultation the name Dalrymple Heights Post Office, after the nearby Mount Dalrymple, was found acceptable by the Postmaster General's Department.

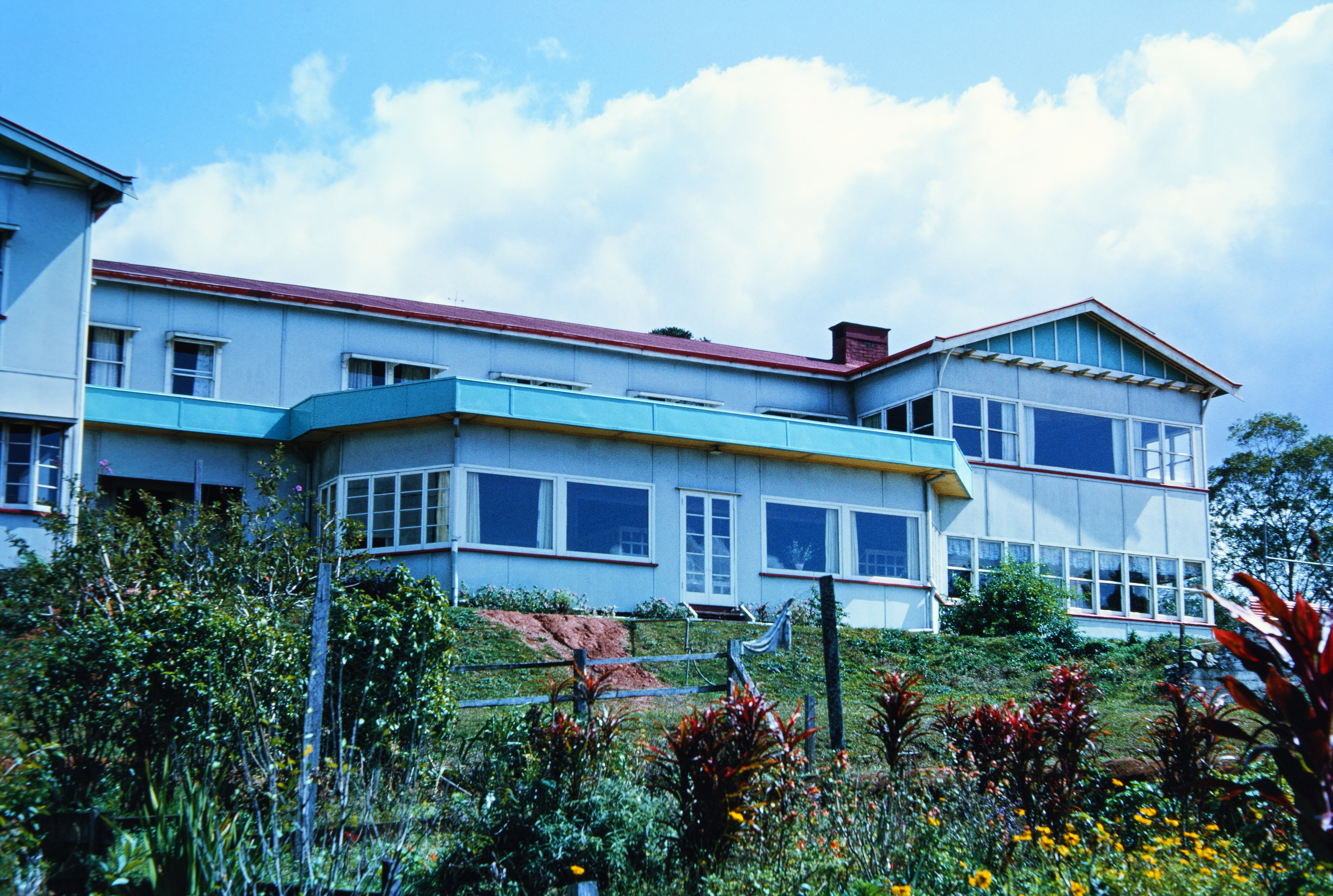
Eungella Chalet, 1963

Eungella was a cool retreat from the heat and humidity of the coast for picnic parties and tourists, and a venue for dances. Nineteen families from the region invested in a syndicate to build and operate the Eungella Chalet which was opened in 1933.

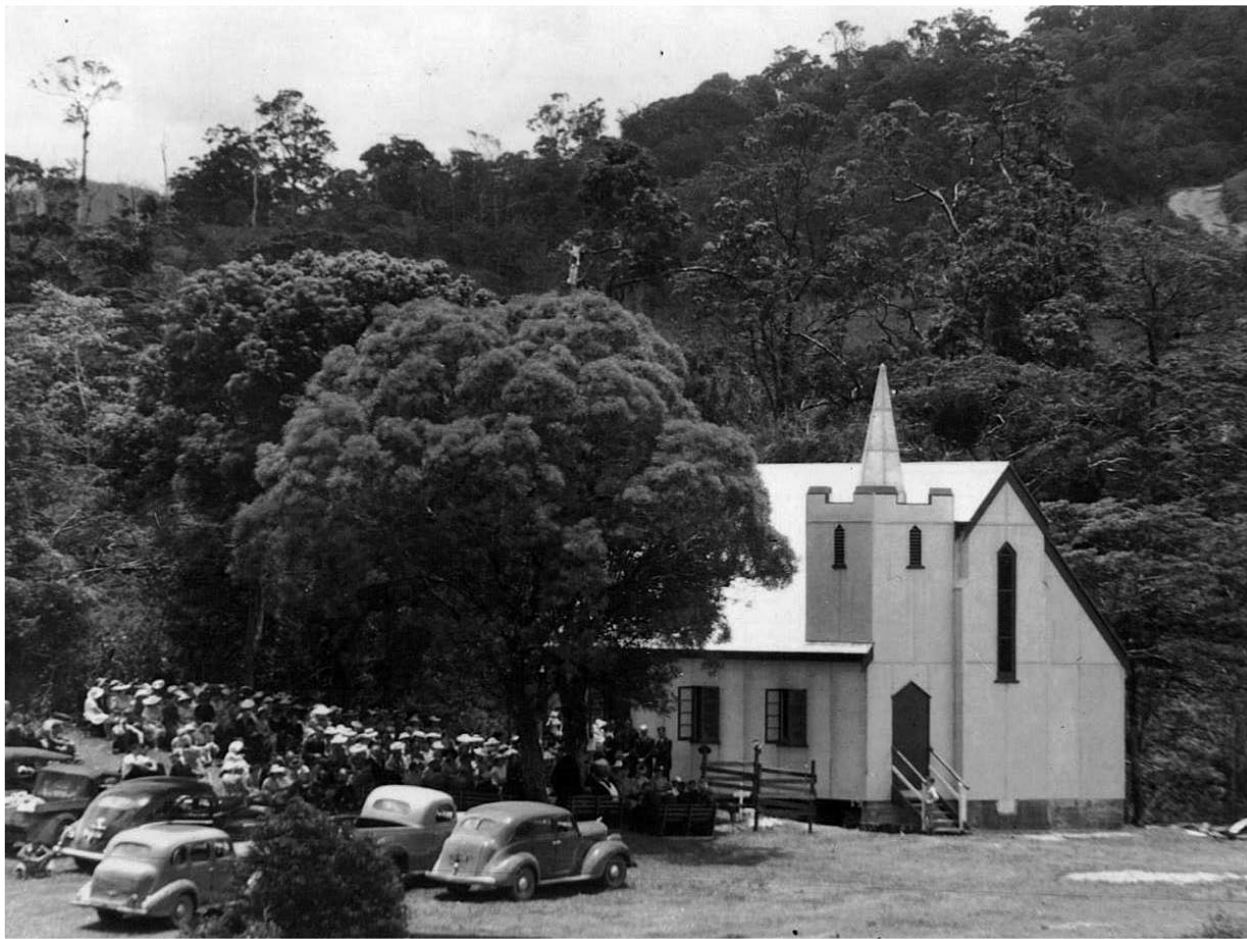
Eungella's New Presbyterian Church, 1947

The foundation stone of the Eungella Presbyterian Church was laid in July 1947 and it was officially opened on 23 November 1947. The church was designed to be a replica of Reverend Maitland's father's church in Victoria. The church was damaged in March 2010 in Cyclone Ului and again in February 2011 in Cyclone Yasi. The church was demolished in April 2011.

== Demographics ==
In the 2016 census, the locality of Eungella had a population of 194 people.

In the 2021 census, the locality of Eungella had a population of 190 people.

== Education ==
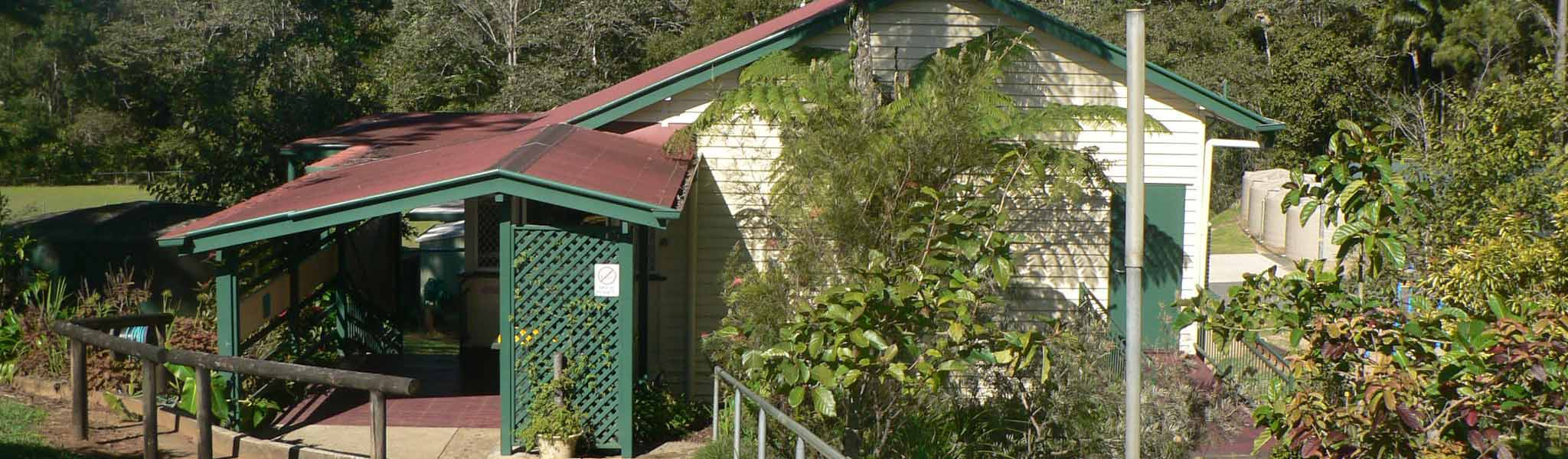
Eungella State School, 2020

Eungella State School is a government primary (Prep–6) school for boys and girls at 36 Eungella Dam Road (21.1344°S 148.4912°E). In 2018, the school had an enrolment of 38 students with 3 teachers (2 full-time equivalent) and 9 non-teaching staff (4 full-time equivalent).

There are no secondary schools in Eungella. The nearest government secondary school is Mirani State High School in Mirani to the east.

== Amenities ==
Eungella Memorial Hall is at 13 North Street (21.1303°S 148.4931°E). It is also known as the Eungella Hub and is managed by the Eungella District Community Association.

The Eungella Uniting Church is part of the Pioneer Valley Uniting Church. The Eungella congregation meet at the Eungella Memorial Hall.

== Events ==
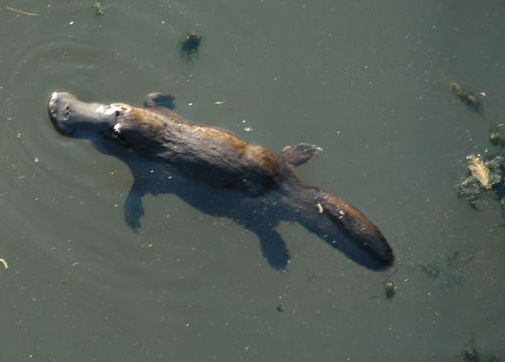
Platypus (Ornithorhynchus anatinus) Broken River, QLD, Australia. 2010

The Eungella Markets are held on the first Sunday morning of every month at the Eungella Memorial Hall.

== Attractions ==
Eungella National Park is a popular attraction and is noted for rain forest walking trails and sightings of platypus. There are also a number of lookouts from the escarpment down the valley, including Goodes Lookout (21.1316°S 148.4936°E) in the town and Sky Window lookout (21.1456°S 148.4990°E) in the national park.
