= Eungella Dam =

Dam near Mackay, North Queensland, Australia

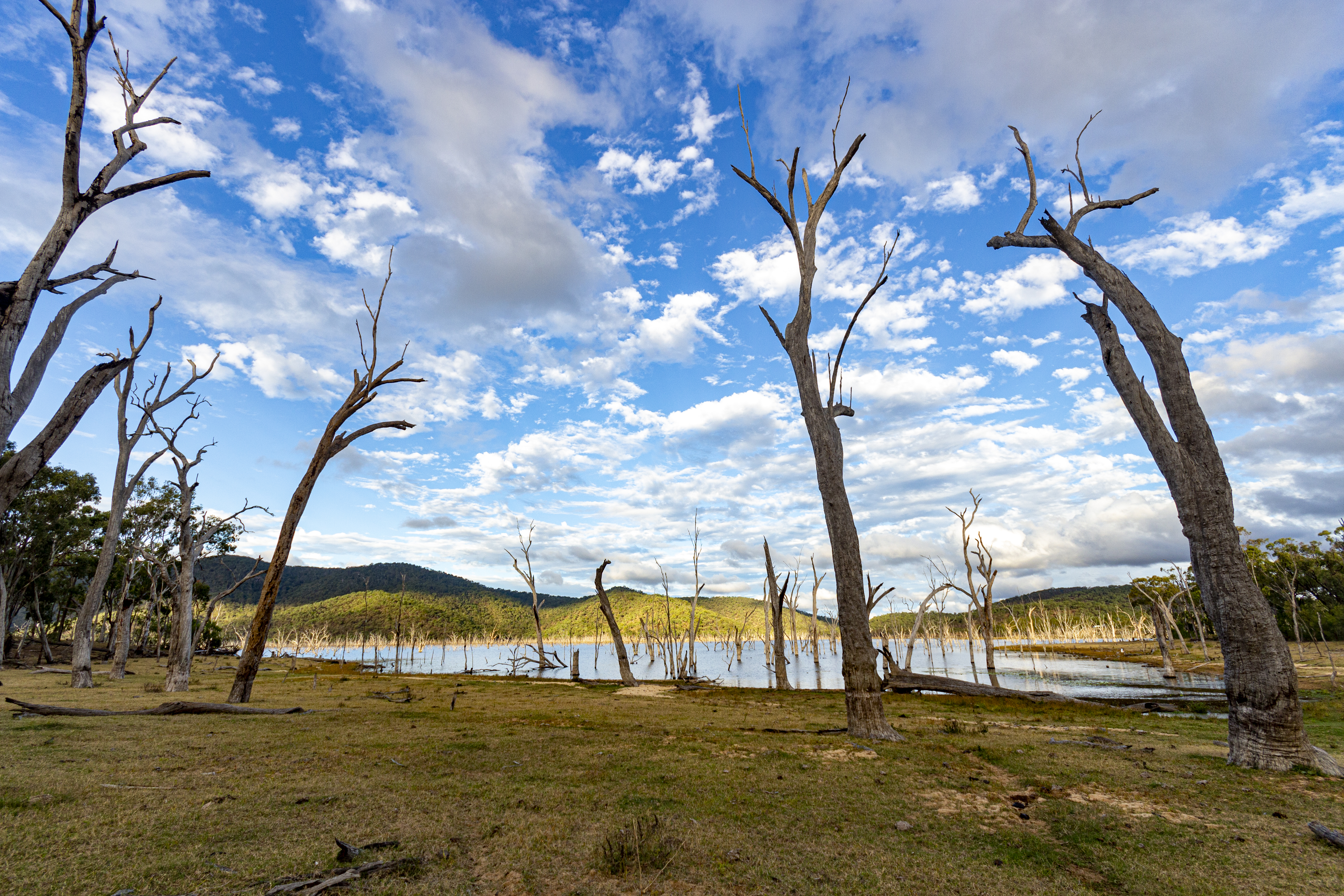
- The dam in drought, in 2021

- Location of the dam in Queensland
- Interactive map of Eungella Dam
- Country: Australia
- Location: 83 km (52 mi) west of Mackay, North Queensland
- Coordinates: 21°08′10″S 148°23′23″E
- Purpose: Irrigation; Potable water supply; Thermal power generation
- Status: Operational
- Construction began: 1964
- Opening date: 1969
- Construction cost: A$12.6 million
- Built by: Sanders Constructions
- Operator: SunWater

Dam and spillways
- Type of dam: Embankment dam
- Impounds: Broken River
- Height (foundation): 49 m (161 ft)
- Length: 276 m (906 ft)
- Dam volume: 524×10^{3} m^{3} (18.5×10^{6} cu ft)
- Spillway type: Uncontrolled
- Spillway capacity: 1,020 m^{3}/s (36,000 cu ft/s)

Reservoir
- Creates: Eungella Reservoir
- Total capacity: 112,400 ML (91,100 acre⋅ft)
- Catchment area: 142 km^{2} (55 sq mi)
- Surface area: 848 ha (2,100 acres)
- Maximum water depth: 37.2 m (122 ft)
- Normal elevation: 560 m (1,840 ft) AHD
- Website sunwater.com.au/dams/eungella-dam

The Eungella Dam is an earth and rock-fill embankment dam across the Broken River, located near the town of Eungella Dam, in the Mackay Region of North Queensland, Australia. Completed in 1969, the dam was built for the purposes of the supply of water for irrigation, town water, and industrial use. The dam operator is SunWater.

== Overview ==
The Eungella Dam was constructed in 1969 at a cost of A$12.6 million to meet the requirements of a thermal power station at Collinsville and the town water requirement of Collinsville and Scottsville. Pipelines were constructed between 1970 and 1999:

- for the supply newly developing mines in the Bowen Basin and the new town of Moranbah;
- from the Bowen River weir to Newlands Mine then on to Glenden; and
- as part the original Utah line to Moranbah, with an extension later to Coppabella and one south to Lake Vermont mine.

The dam is 49 metres (161 ft) high and 276 metres (906 ft) long and holds back 112,400 megalitres (91,100 acre⋅ft) of water when at full capacity. The resultant reservoir, Eungella Reservoir, has an average depth of 14.7 metres (48 ft) and a surface area of 848 hectares (2,100 acres), that draws from a catchment area of 142 square kilometres (55 sq mi).

The dam reached its lowest level of 10.96% in January 2005, and maximum recorded level of 127.08% in April 1989 as a result of heavy rain from Tropical Cyclone Aivu.

In 2005, SunWater commenced a dam spillway capacity upgrade program for sixteen dams, of which the Eungella Dam was listed as the final spillway to be upgraded. The purpose of the upgrades were to ensure the highest level of safety is maintained for the dams and the adjacent communities.

In 2025, it was announced that a pumped hydro project was planned downstream of the dam.

== Recreation ==
Eungella Dam is a scenic lake fringed by rainforest. Camping is the main recreation purpose of the dam, as well as fishing. There are small campsites to set up around the area and small facilities such as drop-down toilets and rubbish bins. Campfires are allowed on the sites. There is plenty of firewood around the area to use, and leaves as well.

As one of Queensland's freshwater fisheries, Eungella Dam has made a name for producing extra oversized sooty grunter and barramundi. A Stocked Impoundment Permit is required to fish in the dam.

== See also ==
- List of dams and reservoirs in Australia
- Eungella National Park
