= Clarke Range =

Mountain range in North Queensland, Australia

Clarke
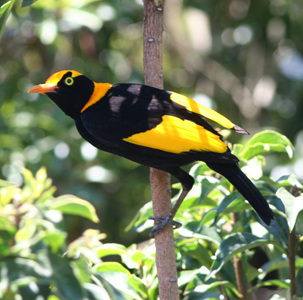
- The Clarke Range is home to an isolated population of the regent bowerbird

Highest point
- Peak: Mount William
- Elevation: 1,270 m (4,170 ft); AHD
- Coordinates: 21°00′54″S 146°38′03″E

Geography
- Location within Queensland
- Country: Australia
- State: Queensland
- Region: North Queensland
- Rivers: Pioneer River and Broken River
- Range coordinates: 21°03′19″S 148°33′52″E
- Parent range: Great Dividing Range

Geology
- Rock type: Granite

The Clarke Range, part of the Great Dividing Range, is a rainforest-covered mountain range located in North Queensland, Australia. The range is located approximately 30 kilometres (19 mi) from the Coral Sea and 65 kilometres (40 mi) west of the coastal city of Mackay. The highest points are the summits of Mount William at about 1,270 metres (4,170 ft) AHD and Mount Dalrymple at 1,227 metres (4,026 ft) AHD.

The range is composed of granite rocks. The slopes of Clarke Range form the upper reaches of the Pioneer River valley. Broken River also rises in the range, flowing west to join the Burdekin River.

An exploration party led by John Mackay were the first Europeans to cross the range on 18 May 1860.

The main road over the range winds sharply and steeply and is not suitable for caravans.

== Birds ==
Some 950 square kilometres (370 sq mi) of the Clarke Range, encompassing the Eungella National Park, has been classified as an Important Bird Area by BirdLife International because it supports most of the population of the Eungella honeyeater, an isolated northern population of the regent bowerbird, and large numbers of bush stone-curlews.

== See also ==
- List of mountains in Queensland
