= Charles Lloyd =

Charles Lloyd may refer to:

== Military ==
- Charles Lloyd (Australian general) (1899–1956), Australian Army general
- Charles Lloyd (South Africa) (died 2014), South African army general

== Music ==
- Charles Lloyd (jazz musician) (born 1938), American jazz saxophonist
- Charles Harford Lloyd (1849–1919), English composer and organist
- Charles Lloyd (organ builder) (1835–1908), pipe organ builder based in Nottingham
- C. F. Lloyd (Charles Francis Lloyd, fl. 1909–1928), his son, organ builder

== Politics ==
- Sir Charles Lloyd, 1st Baronet, of Garth (died c. 1678), member of parliament (MP) for Montgomeryshire
- Sir Charles Lloyd, 1st Baronet, of Milfield (1662–1723), MP for Cardigan boroughs, 1698–1701
- Charles Lloyd (Labour politician) (1879–1939), MP for Llandaff and Barry, 1929–1931

== Religion ==
- Charles Lloyd (minister) (1766–1829), Welsh dissenter and schoolmaster
- Charles Lloyd (bishop) (1784–1829), bishop of Oxford
- Charles Lloyd (priest) (1879–?), Dean of Argyll and The Isles

== Sportspeople ==
- Charles Lloyd (cricketer) (1789–1876), English cricketer
- Brian Lloyd (rower) (Charles Brian Murray Lloyd, 1927–1995), British Olympic rower
- Charlie Lloyd (footballer), English footballer
- Charlie Lloyd (rugby league), Australian rugby league player
- Chuck Lloyd (born 1947), American basketball player

== Other ==
- Charles Lloyd (philanthropist) (1748–1828), English banker
- Charles Lloyd (poet) (1775–1839), son of the banker
- Charles W. Lloyd (1915–1999), educationalist
- Charles Cornwallis Lloyd (c. 1700–1729), British aristocrat
- Charles Mostyn Lloyd (1878–1946), British academic, magazine editor, and socialist activist
- Charles Lloyd, pen name of Charles Birkin (1907–1985), English author
- Charles Howard Lloyd (1873–1937), American architect
