= Mackay–Eungella Road =

Road in Queensland, Australia

Mackay–Eungella Road Queensland

General information
- Type: Rural road
- Length: 69.7 km (43 mi)
- Route number(s): State Route 64

Major junctions
- East end: Peak Downs Highway Alexandra
- Marian–Hampden Road; Marian–Eton Road
- West end: Eungella Dam Road Eungella

Location(s)
- Major settlements: Pleystowe, Marian, Mirani, Finch Hatton

Mackay–Eungella Road is a continuous 69.7 kilometres (43.3 mi) road route in the Mackay region of Queensland, Australia. The entire route is signed as State Route 64. It is a state-controlled regional road (number 532). At the western end it becomes Eungella Dam Road. (see below)

== Route description ==
The road commences at an intersection with the Peak Downs Highway (State Route 70) in Alexandra. It runs north-west and then west, following the Pioneer River through Walkerston to Pleystowe, passing the Pleystowe Sugar Mill. The land beside the road is primarily used to grow sugar cane. It continues west and south-west through more canefields, following the river to Marian, where it passes exits to Marian–Hampden Road and Marian–Eton Road, both part of State Route 5, and another sugar mill.

It then runs south-west through more cane fields, following the river to Mirani. From there it proceeds generally west, following Cattle Creek and passing through the locality of Benholme and the villages of Gargett, Pinnacle and Finch Hatton before reaching the locality of Netherdale at the foot of the Clarke Range. From there the road climbs the escarpment of the range to Eungella, becoming narrower, steeper and with tighter bends as it rises. It is deemed unsuitable for caravans, although it is frequently used by large trucks. The road (and State Route 64) ends at an intersection with Bee Creek Road in Eungella, but the physical road continues a further 40 kilometres (25 mi) km to the Eungella Dam picnic area.

== Eungella Dam Road ==
Eungella Dam Road
- Location: Mackay–Eungella Road, Eungella to Eungella Dam picnic area, Eungella Dam
- Length: 33.3 km (20.7 mi)

Eungella Dam Road is a state-controlled district road (number 5324), rated as a local road of regional significance (LRRS). It runs from Mackay–Eungella Road in Eungella to the Eungella Dam picnic area in Eungella Dam, a distance of 33.3 kilometres (20.7 mi). It intersects with the Crediton Loop Road at two locations within Crediton. This road, part of which was constructed in 1969 in conjunction with the dam, provides access to many of the tourist attractions that are of interest to visitors. These include Eungella National Park and Eungella Dam. The section of road from Eungella to Crediton is an upgraded version of a much earlier road.

== Road condition ==
The road is fully sealed. The mountain section has a distance of about 370 metres (400 yd) with an incline greater than 15%, a further 330 metres (360 yd) between 10 and 15%, and another 500 metres (550 yd) between 5 and 10%. The change in elevation from Netherdale to Eungella is 490 metres (1,610 ft) in about 4 kilometres (2.5 mi).

== History ==
Mackay was established as a pastoral area in 1862, and most of the available land was quickly taken up as pastoral runs, including one named Eungella on what is now known as the Eungella Plateau. Some early settlers in the Pioneer Valley experimented with sugar cane and other cash crops, with sugar cane being so successful that it soon became the predominant crop in the district.

To cater for a growing industry the first commercial sugar mill was built at Alexandra in 1868. The Pleystowe mill followed in 1869, and the Marian mill in 1883. As the industry expanded new mills were built along the river valley and Cattle Creek, culminating in the Cattle Creek mill at Finch Hatton in 1906.

Sugar cane became so important to the Queensland economy that a railway was built to transport cane to the mills. It arrived at Mirani, then known as Hamilton, in 1895. The route was via Alexandra, Nebo and Newbury Junction (near Marian) bypassing Pleystowe. Later it became the main line to Mackay, with a station at Pleystowe, and the Nebo line became a branch line. The main line was extended to Pinnacle by 1902, Finch Hatton by 1904, and Netherdale by 1911.

The first roads in the valley were tracks connecting the pastoral runs to Mackay. The growth of the sugar cane industry drove the need for more substantial roads to transport the crops to the mills, and to provide access to the port in Mackay for other commerce. Later, roads were needed to transport cane from an expanded source to railway stations.

Gold was discovered in several locations on the Eungella Plateau in 1888. The largest field was at Crediton, on the southern end of the plateau, where a town for about 200 miners and their families was established. Access to the goldfields was by tracks some distance south of the present road. Logging also took place on the plateau from 1904 until 1941, when the Eungella National Park was declared. By then about 50% of the original forest had been cleared.

By the 1930s a very basic road up the mountain on the present alignment had been constructed, and road building was occurring on the plateau. In 1935 a new settler on his first trip up the mountain described the road as a "perilous climb".

== Major intersections ==
All distances are from Google Maps. The entire road is in the Mackay local government area.

Location	km	mi	Destinations	Notes
Alexandra	0	0.0	Peak Downs Highway – east – Mackay west – Walkerston	Eastern end of Mackay–Eungella Road (State Route 64)
Marian	15.8– 16.7	9.8– 10.4	Marian–Hampden Road – north – Hampden and Bruce Highway; Marian–Eton Road – south – Eton	Concurrent with State Route 5 for 900 metres (980 yd).
Eungella	69.7	43.3	Bee Creek Road – north–west – Eungella village Eungella Dam Road – south – Eungella Dam (locality)	Western end of Mackay–Eungella Road (State Route 64). Roadway continues south as Eungella Dam Road.
1.000 mi = 1.609 km; 1.000 km = 0.621 mi: Concurrency terminus

== See also ==
- List of road routes in Queensland
- List of numbered roads in Queensland
- Lt Thomas Armstrong Memorial, in Mirani
- Mirani railway station
- Mount Martin Cane Lift, near Mirani
- Kinchant Dam, near Mirani
- Teemburra Dam, near Pinnacle
- Finch Hatton War Memorial
- Finch Hatton railway station
