= Finch Hatton railway station =

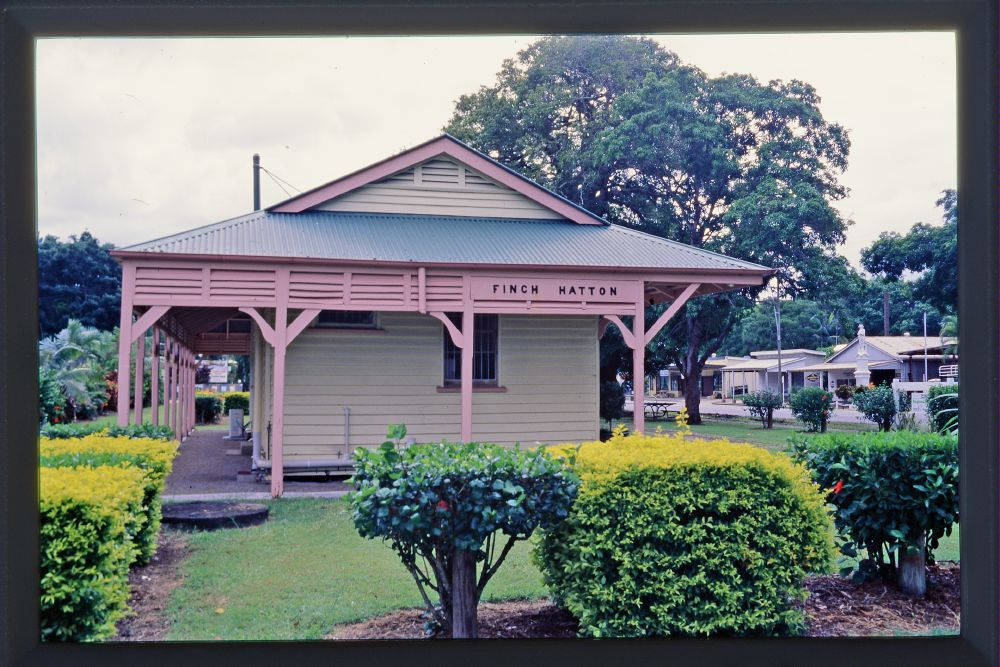
- Finch Hatton railway station

- Location within Queensland Location within Australia
- 21.1407°S 148.6323°E
- Location: Mackay–Eungella Road, Finch Hatton, Mackay Region, Queensland, Australia

History
- Design period: 1900–1914 (early 20th century)
- Built: 1904

Site notes
- Architectural style: Classicism

Queensland Heritage Register
- Official name: Finch Hatton Railway Station, Hattton Railway Station, Pelion Railway Station
- Type: state heritage (built)
- Designated: 6 December 2004
- Reference no.: 600985
- Significant period: 1904–1990 (historical)
- Significant components: railway station, views to

Finch Hatton railway station is a heritage-listed former railway station at Mackay–Eungella Road, Finch Hatton, Mackay Region, Queensland, Australia. It was built in 1904. It is also known as Hatton railway station and Pelion railway station. It was added to the Queensland Heritage Register on 6 December 2004.

== History ==
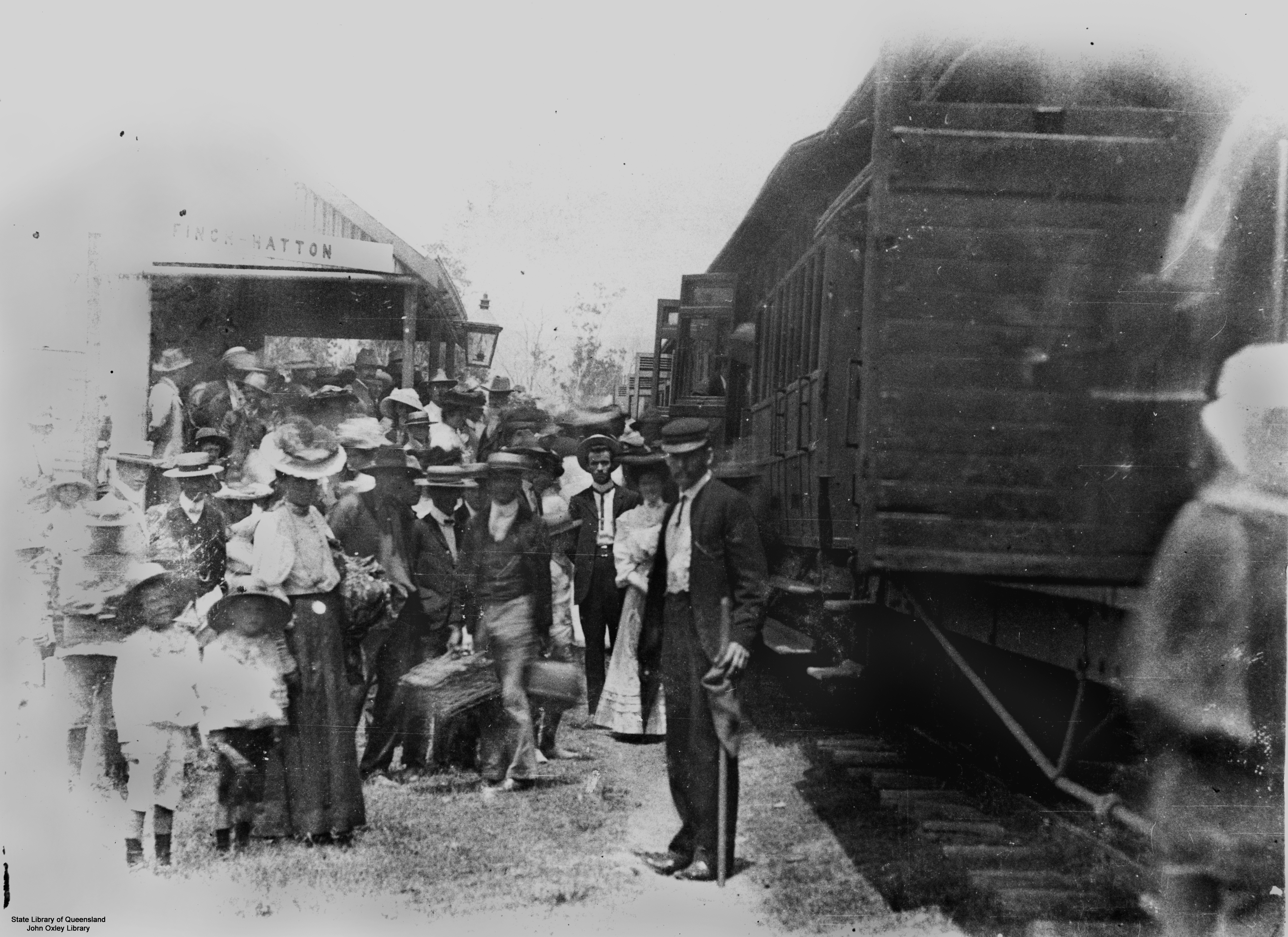
Group of people on the platform of the Finch Hatton railway station, circa 1906

The Finch Hatton railway station opened on 21 September 1904. The station formed part of the Pioneer Valley Line of the Mackay Railway, the first stage of which opened on 10 August 1885 terminating at Mirani. In search of new pastoral land, John Mackay and his party entered and named the valley of the Mackay River in 1860 (renamed Pioneer River in 1862), and the following year he returned to establish a cattle station. Other settlers quickly followed. In 1862, the ketch "Presto" entered the Mackay River landing stores and building materials, then surveyed the river mouth, which consequently was gazetted as a Port of Entry.

In the earliest years of non-Indigenous settlement of the Pioneer Valley, the area was leased as two cattle runs, Hamilton and Hopetoun. They were worked as one property with the head station at Hamilton, across the Pioneer River from the township now known as Mirani. Prior to the opening of the railway station in 1885, the town of Mirani was known as Hamilton, after one of the cattle properties, but was changed so that no confusion could arise between it and the suburb of Hamilton in Brisbane.

Sugar cane is a bulky crop that transports well, but it needs to be processed quickly once harvested. In the 19th century, the only transport method that answered these requirements was the railway. Every sugar district developed a network of tramways and railways, provided by a combination of the sugar mills, local government and the Queensland Government.

The first sugar mill in the district, John Ewen Davidson's, Alexandra was established in 1868. Agitation for a local rail network began in the late 1870s. The principal advocates were the independent cane growers who were forced to send their cane to the nearest plantation mill to be crushed. A government-operated rail network was a means of overcoming that dependence and allowing growers to choose which mill crushed their cane. The Colonial Sugar Refining Company had introduced the two feet gauge steam tramway to the Queensland canefields when it built three large sugar mills simultaneously, at Homebush south-west of Mackay, at Victoria on the Herbert River and at Goondi on the Johnstone River. Homebush Mill opened in 1883.

Approval for the Pioneer Valley line was granted by the Parliament in October 1882. Mackay was growing in name as the centre of a prosperous sugar district, and, due to the input on the Colonial Sugar Refining Company, already had private steam tramways. In 1880 John Spiller built a five kilometre line on his River Estate plantation and worked it with a locally built vertical boiler engine. The following year he built a similar line on his Pioneer plantation, both on the north side of the river.

A railway route was surveyed west from Mackay parallel to the south bank of the river to a point opposite Hamilton (later Mirani) railway station and construction began in late 1883. The contract was awarded to George Bashford & Co in late 1883. Nearly 2000 people assembled to watch the Queensland Governor, Anthony Musgrave, ceremonially turn the first sod on his first visit to Mackay even though work had been underway for a month. The first stage from Mackay to Mirani was opened on 10 August 1885. A branch line commencing at Newbury Junction, west of Mackay, ran south towards Eton, the only other settlement of note in the district apart from Mackay and Walkerston.

In 1885, with the Mackay Railway terminating at Mirani, the town was the limit of closer settlement. Throughout the 1890s the government received requests for the Pioneer Valley line to be extended to open up more land for cane, particularly the extensive area of land that lay between Mirani and the Eungella Ranges. Selectors began to farm the fertile areas further west of Mirani within the vicinity of McGregor's Creek; however the unbridged Pioneer River was an impediment to further expansion.

A short extension of the line was finally made over the Pioneer River at Mirani in 1897 to give growers access to rail transport. Expenditure for the bridge of five, 34-metre (112 ft) long steel spans on high concrete piers was approved and contract let to A Overend & Co, in August 1896. The two kilometres of track to Mirani West officially opened on 11 December 1897.

Plans for major extension of the Pioneer Railway line were tabled before Parliament on 30 November 1900. The extension further west to Pinnacle, opened on 7 July 1902. This was the first line completed under the new day labour system.

The Pioneer Valley line was instrumental in the expansion of the sugar industry, significantly increasing the amount of land that could be cultivated for sugar on an economically viable basis, as well as being a critical factor in the development of a central mill system, providing an alternate transport system to shipping, thus enabling cane plantations to be located away from major waterways.

Whilst the Pioneer Valley line was extended to Pinnacle by 1902, good quality agricultural land lay for many kilometres beyond the railway terminus. Around the same time as the extension of the Pioneer Valley line, the Racecourse Central Sugar Company had embarked upon an extension program of developing cane growing in the Upper Pioneer Valley. The Sugar Company, together with the Pioneer Shire Council and the selectors in the area combined to turn what was previously a sparsely settled area into a productive sugar district. Playing a key role in furthering the area cultivated for sugar was the extension of the railway line through to Finch Hatton.

Almost immediately after the railway line was extended to Pinnacle, the government was lobbied to extend the line further. The government, however, had other priorities, resulting in the Pioneer Shire Council deciding to construct the next stage to Finch Hatton, as well as a branch line from Pinnacle along McGregor's Creek. The railway from Pinnacle to Finch Hatton opened on 21 September 1904. Finch Hatton now became the terminus for the Pioneer Valley line and this was the trigger for closer settlement within the area and gave rise to the establishment of the township.

In September 1904, the Mackay Chronicle reported that Hatton (as Finch Hatton was then known) was beginning to assume a business air with the residences of Messrs Peoples and Zahmel within sight of the terminus. A hotel, run by a Mr Waters, had also been constructed. The extension of the railway line to Finch Hatton was a catalyst for the opening up of further land for sugar cane with the opening of the Cattle Creek mill, south-east of Finch Hatton in 1906. In 1906, Hatton was renamed Pelion, however a few months later the name was changed to Finch Hatton.

The government took over responsibility of the Pinnacle-Finch Hatton section of the railway line from 1 July 1910 and quickly constructed the extension west to Netherdale (this station was also known as the Eungella Range). By 1914, tourists began to access the Eungella Range area by travelling to Netherdale by rail and walking up the newly improved road to Eungella.

Finch Hatton station had a station master in charge, attending to the substantial traffic to and from the adjacent Cattle Creek mill which had its own private siding. The Station Master, Edward Crow, was promoted in mid-1915, and the local newspaper correspondent mentioned the long hours at the station. There was also a Night Officer so that the station was staffed two shifts.

In 1913, Queensland Railways published a brochure titled "Tours in the Mackay District "which highlighted the natural beauty of the region especially that of the Eungella Ranges. By the 1920s, Finch Hatton had become the largest township in the area outside of Mackay and Sarina.

In 1932, a special committee was set up, comprising the representatives of the departments of Land, Forestry and Agriculture and the Director of the Mackay Butter Factory to investigate the settlement, forestry and scenic potential of the Eungella area. The outcome of that investigation was that the area of "primeval" jungle should be preserved. In 1941, acknowledgement of the importance of the Eungella area led to the gazettal of Eungella National Park.

The Mackay Railway, from Kowari to Netherdale (west of Finch Hatton) officially closed on 19 December 1977 after being damaged by flooding. The section of the Mackay Railway between Marian and Finch Hatton (which included the Finch Hatton railway station) closed on 2 October 1990. The position of station master was abolished in 1988 and the goods shed had been sold for removal. The Cattle Creek Mill also closed in 1990. This was a common pattern in sugar districts as industry deregulation resulted in cane lands going out of production and mills closing. Many tram and rail lines disappeared and road transport was increasingly used to take the harvest to the mills.

By 1994, the railway complex comprised only the station building as the station master's house was relocated to Zahmel Street, Finch Hatton.

The former station building was then taken over by the Mirani Shire Council, operating the building as the Finch Hatton Historic Railway Station and Internet Access Centre. The Station and Centre focuses on the local and social history and the development of the Pioneer Valley and opens on a daily basis. In 2015, following the amalgamation of local government areas including Shire of Mirani, the building is owned and operated by the Mackay Regional Council.

== Description ==
The former Finch Hatton Railway Station is a single storey, timber-framed building, set on low timber stumps, clad with timber weatherboards. The building has a gable roof on the eastern side and a gambrel roof on the western side, clad with corrugated iron. Timber louvered ventilators are located high in the western and eastern elevations. The roof extends on the northern, southern and sides of the building creating shade to these sections.

The fretted shelter shed spandrels running the length of the structure on the northern and southern sides compare with the Mirani railway station building, further to the east along the line. The station building has timber louvred valance along the western elevation with station name boards.

Accommodation from east to west consists of the former ladies' room and closet, shelter area and office.

The building is surrounded by well manicured grounds and mature trees. A number of commemorative cairns are located within the property.

== Heritage listing ==
The former Finch Hatton Railway Station was listed on the Queensland Heritage Register on 6 December 2004 having satisfied the following criteria.

The place is important in demonstrating the evolution or pattern of Queensland's history.

The Finch Hatton railway station building is important as a substantially intact example of a country branch line station building, demonstrating the importance of the Queensland sugar industry's railway networks and the gradual loss of this network following industry deregulation and a shift to road transport of harvested cane. Located on the Pioneer Valley Line of the Mackay Railway, the Finch Hatton railway station building is an extant reminder of the growth of the district as pre-eminent cane growing area in the late 19th and early 20th century. The opening of the area through the establishment of the railway also prompted the development of the timber and tourism industries.

The place is important in demonstrating the principal characteristics of a particular class of cultural places.

With spaces formerly consisting of office area, shelter area with shade to both sides of the building and with ticket windows facing the shelter areas, the Finch Hatton Railway Station building is a good example of a country branch line timber railway building. Its decorative fretted shelter shed spandrels compare with the Mirani railway station building.

The place is important because of its aesthetic significance.

The Finch Hatton railway station building is important for its aesthetic significance, particularly with regard to the station building's unusual architectural features, its intact state and by its picturesque setting in the main street of the township, close to the Finch Hatton War Memorial.
