= Sarina–Eton–Hampden Road =

Road in Queensland, Australia

Sarina–Eton–Hampden Road Sarina–Homebush Road Eton–Homebush Road Marian–Eton Road Marian–Hampden Road Queensland

General information
- Type: Rural road
- Length: 62.7 km (39 mi)
- Route number(s): State Route 5

Major junctions
- Southeast end: Bruce Highway, Sarina
- Homebush Road; Peak Downs Highway; Mirani–Eton Road; North Eton Road; Mackay–Eungella Road
- Northwest end: Bruce Highway, Hampden

Location(s)
- Major settlements: Homebush, Eton, Marian

Sarina–Eton–Hampden Road is a non-continuous 62.7-kilometre (39.0 mi) road route in the Mackay local government area of Queensland, Australia. It has four official names, Sarina–Homebush Road, Eton–Homebush Road, Marian–Eton Road, and Marian–Hampden Road. The entire route is signed as State Route 5. The four roads are state-controlled, with the following characteristics:

- Sarina–Homebush, district, number 517, local road of regional significance (LRRS).
- Eton–Homebush, regional, number 518.
- Marian–Eton, regional, number 533, LRRS.
- Marian–Hampden, regional, number 535.

== Route description ==
The road starts as Sarina–Homebush Road at an intersection with the Bruce Highway in Sarina. It runs west and southwest across Sarina as State Route 5, before turning northwest and passing between Sarina and Munbura. Next it runs between Munbura and Sunnyside before crossing Sunnyside and entering Oakenden. Crossing Oakenden it turns north into Homebush, where it then turns northwest before reaching Eton–Homebush Road and Homebush Road at a T-junction. Homebush Road exits to the northeast and the road continues southwest as Eton–Homebush Road.

Leaving Homebush the road turns west and enters the northern part of Oakenden. Crossing Oakenden it runs northwest, southwest, west and northwest again before it enters Eton, where it meets the Peak Downs Highway at a T-junction. The road turns northeast and runs concurrent with the highway until it reaches the exit to Marian–Eton Road. It continues northwest and then west as Marian–Eton Road before reaching the exit to Mirani–Eton Road to the west. Here it turns north before entering North Eton. Continuing north it passes the exit to North Eton Road to the east.

Next the road enters Marian where it turns northwest and then north again. In Marian it meets Mackay–Eungella Road at a T-junction. Here it turns east and runs concurrent with Mackay–Eungella Road until it reaches the exit to Marian–Hampden Road, where it turns north and crosses the Pioneer River. It then enters Hampden and continues north to the Bruce Highway, where it ends.

The road is fully sealed to at least a two lane standard.

== History ==
Sarina was originally known as Plane Creek, but took its present name from the Sarina Inlet which was in turn named after Sarina, the Greek mythological enchantress, by William Charles Borlase Wilson, a surveyor, some time before 1882.

The name Homebush is taken from a pastoral run name used by John Walker in 1866. Homebush Sugar Mill opened in 1883 and closed in 1922.

Originally known as the Defiance, the North Eton Central Mill commenced crushing sugarcane in 1888. It was the first sugar mill sponsored by the Queensland Government. In 1989, a number of sugar mills in the district merged to Mackay Sugar Limited, resulting in the closure of the North Eton mill.

The town name Marian comes from the name of the (now closed) Marian railway station, which in turn reportedly derived its name from a local property called Mary Ann. Marian sugar mill was built in 1885, later closed, and replaced by a new mill in 1894. Mackay Sugar operates the mill where over 2 million tonnes of sugar is crushed every year, making it one of the largest sugar mills in Australia.

== Intersecting state-controlled roads ==
This road intersects with the following state-controlled roads:

- Homebush Road
- Peak Downs Highway
- Mirani–Eton Road
- North Eton Road
- Mackay–Eungella Road

=== Homebush Road ===
Homebush Road
- Location: Sarina–Homebush Road and Eton-Homebush Road, Homebush to Bruce Highway, Rosella
- Length: 12.6 km (7.8 mi)

Homebush Road is a state-controlled regional road (number 516). It runs from the intersection of Sarina–Homebush Road and Eton–Homebush Road in Homebush to the Bruce Highway in Rosella, a distance of 12.6 kilometres (7.8 mi). This road has no major intersections.

=== Mirani–Eton Road ===
Mirani–Eton Road
- Location: Mackay–Eungella Road, Mirani to Marian–Eton Road, Eton
- Length: 22.8 km (14.2 mi)

Mirani–Eton Road is a state-controlled district road (number 534), rated as a local road of regional significance (LRRS). It runs from Mackay–Eungella Road in Mirani to Marian–Eton Road in Eton, a distance of 22.8 kilometres (14.2 mi). This road has no major intersections.

=== North Eton Road ===
North Eton Road
- Location: Peak Downs Highway, Eton to Marian–Eton Road, North Eton
- Length: 3.8 km (2.4 mi)

North Eton Road is a state-controlled district road (number 5332), rated as a local road of regional significance (LRRS). It runs from the Peak Downs Highway in Eton to Marian–Eton Road in North Eton, a distance of 3.8 kilometres (2.4 mi). This road has no major intersections.

== Major intersections ==
All distances are from Google Maps. The entire road is within the Mackay local government area.

| Location | km | mi | Destinations | Notes |
|---|---|---|---|---|
| Sarina | 0 | 0.0 | Bruce Highway – north – Alligator Creek, Mackay – south – Koumala, Marlborough | Road starts as Sarina–Homebush Road. It runs west as State Route 5. |
| Homebush | 26.3 | 16.3 | Eton–Homebush Road – southwest – Oakenden; Homebush Road – northeast – Rosella, Bruce Highway | Road turns southwest as Eton–Homebush Road |
| Eton | 36.7 | 22.8 | Peak Downs Highway – southwest – Hazeldean, Nebo – northeast – Victoria Plains, Walkerston | Road turns northeast concurrent with Peak Downs Highway |
| Eton | 37.4 | 23.2 | Marian–Eton Road – northwest – Mirani–Eton Road | Road turns northwest as Marian–Eton Road |
| Eton | 38.8 | 24.1 | Marian–Eton Road – north – North Eton, Marian; Mirani–Eton Road – west – Brightly, Mirani | Road turns north as Marian–Eton Road |
| North Eton | 42.5 | 26.4 | North Eton Road – east – Eton | Road continues north as Marian–Eton Road |
| Marian | 53.1 | 33.0 | Mackay–Eungella Road – west – Mirani, Eungella east – Pleystowe, Mackay | Road turns east concurrent with Mackay–Eungella Road |
| Marian | 54.0 | 33.6 | Marian–Hampden Road – north – Hampden, Bruce Highway | Road turns north as Marian–Hampden Road |
| Hampden | 62.7 | 39.0 | Bruce Highway – northwest – Mount Ossa, Proserpine – east – Farleigh, Mackay | Northern end of Marian–Hampden Road |
1.000 mi = 1.609 km; 1.000 km = 0.621 mi: Concurrency terminus; Route transition

== See also ==
- List of numbered roads in Queensland
