= Mirani railway station, Queensland =

Mirani railway station
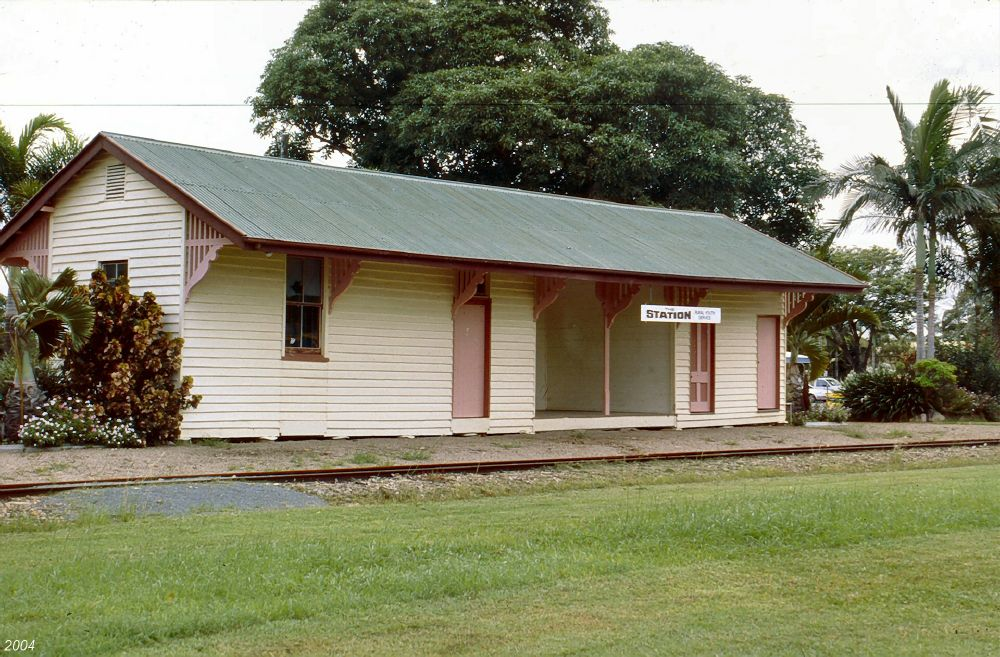
- Mirani railway station, 2004

- Location within Queensland Location within Australia
- 21.1591°S 148.8644°E
- Location: Victoria Street, Mirani, Mackay Region, Queensland, Australia

History
- Design period: 1870s–1890s (late 19th century)
- Built: 1885–1913

Site notes
- Architectural style: Classicism

Queensland Heritage Register
- Official name: Mirani Railway Station Building, Hamilton Railway Station
- Type: state heritage (built)
- Designated: 7 July 2005
- Reference no.: 600984
- Significant period: 1880s–1970s (historical)
- Significant components: railway station, views to

Mirani railway station is a heritage-listed former railway station on the former Pioneer Valley railway line at Victoria Street, Mirani, Mackay Region, Queensland, Australia. It was built from 1885 to 1913. It is also known as Hamilton railway station. It was added to the Queensland Heritage Register on 7 July 2005.

== History ==
The Mirani railway station opened on 10 August 1885. The station formed part of the Pioneer Valley Line of the Mackay Railway which opened on the same day. In search of new pastoral land, John Mackay and his party entered and named the valley of the Mackay River in 1860 (renamed Pioneer River in 1862), and the following year he returned to establish a cattle station. Other settlers quickly followed. In 1862, the ketch "Presto" entered the Mackay River landing stores and building materials, then surveyed the river mouth, which consequently was gazetted as a Port of Entry.

In the earliest years of non-Indigenous settlement of the Pioneer Valley, the area was leased as two cattle runs, Hamilton and Hopetoun. They were worked as one property with the head station at Hamilton, across the Pioneer River from the township now known as Mirani. Prior to the opening of the railway station in 1885, Mirani was known as Hamilton, after one of the cattle properties, but was changed so that no confusion could arise between it and Hamilton in Brisbane.

Sugar cane is a bulky crop that transports well, but it needs to be processed quickly once harvested. In the 19th century, the only transport method that answered these requirements was the railway. Every sugar district developed a network of tramways and railways, provided by a combination of the sugar mills, local government and the Queensland Government.

Agitation for a local rail network began in the late 1870s. The principal advocates were the independent cane growers who were forced to send their cane to the nearest plantation mill to be crushed. The first sugar mill in the district, John Ewen Davidson's, Alexandra was established in 1868. A government-run rail network was a means of overcoming that dependence and allowing growers to choose which mill crushed their cane. The Colonial Sugar Refining Company had introduced the two feet gauge steam tramway to the Queensland canefields when it built three large sugar mills simultaneously, at Homebush south-west of Mackay, at Victoria on the Herbert River and at Goondi on the Johnstone River. Homebush Mill opened in 1883.

Approval for the Pioneer Valley line was granted by the Queensland Parliament in October 1882. Mackay was growing in name as the centre of a prosperous sugar district, and, due to the input on the Colonial Sugar Refining Company, already had private steam tramways. In 1880 John Spiller built a five kilometre line on his River Estate plantation and worked it with a locally built vertical boiler engine. The following year he built a similar line on his Pioneer plantation, both on the north side of the river.

A railway route was surveyed west from Mackay parallel to the south bank of the river to a point opposite Hamilton (later Mirani) station and construction began in late 1883. The contract was awarded to George Bashford & Co in late 1883. Nearly 2000 people assembled to watch the Governor ceremonially turn the first sod on his first visit to Mackay even though work had been underway for a month. The first stage from Mackay to Mirani was opened on 10 August 1885. A branch line commencing at Newbury Junction, west of Mackay, ran south towards Eton, the only other settlement of note in the district apart from Mackay and Walkerston. Construction work on the railway line was virtually halted for three months in 1884 due to flooding which, at the time, was the highest on record.

The railway station became a focal point of the township of Mirani. A post mistress was appointed and all postal business was conducted from the station from 1888 to 1924 when separate postal facilities were established in Alexandra Street. Harry Wesche planted mango trees in the station's yard when he worked there c.1915. Some of those trees survive today.

In 1885, with the Mackay Railway terminating at Mirani, the town was the limit of closer settlement. Throughout the 1890s the government received requests for the Pioneer Valley line to be extended to open up more land for cane, particularly the extensive area of land that lay between Mirani and the Eungella Ranges. The Pioneer River however, was a significant barrier.

A short extension of the line was finally made over the Pioneer River at Mirani in 1897 to give growers access to rail transport. Expenditure for the bridge of five, 34-metre (112 ft) long steel spans on high concrete piers was approved and contract let to A Overend & Co, in August 1896. The two kilometres of track to Mirani West, officially opened on 11 December 1897, were laid without authority until the plans were resubmitted by the Philp Government and approved in December 1900. The extension further west to Pinnacle, opened on 7 July 1902. This was the first line completed under the new day labour system.

The Pioneer Valley Line of the Mackay Railway was the catalyst for the establishment of the township, Mirani, that became an important secondary centre within the Mackay region. Further, the Pioneer Valley line was instrumental in the expansion of the sugar industry, significantly increasing the amount of land that could be cultivated for sugar on an economically viable basis, as well as being a critical factor in the development of a central mill system, providing an alternate transport system to shipping, thus enabling cane plantations to be located away from major waterways.

There was little goods traffic. The line carefully avoided any contact with the Homebush mill tramway, whilst the sugar mills at Meadowlands, Te Kowai, Alexandra, Palms, Pleystowe and Marian continued to haul sugar to town and cane to the mill by road. Only the Victoria Sugar Mill near Eton was right beside the railway. Matters were rectified after a visit to Mackay by Commissioner Curnow in April 1887, and the department agreed to build short spurs to Te Kowai, Palms, Alexandra and Pleystowe mills, with the owners repaying the cost over five years. A similar siding had already been built to Marian mill; it was repaid by a surcharge. The Government financed the construction of two Central Mills in 1888, Racecourse Sugar Mill beside the railway line at the Lagoons and at North Eton. The latter had a siding to Drapers (south-west of Mackay) which was shifted in 1902 to connect at Victoria.

By 1899, the Mirani Railway comprised the station building, with an addition to the roadside, as well as a detached kitchen. In 1899, Henrik Hansen prepared drawings for a ladies' room and closet to be added to the Finch Hatton end of the building.

In 1913, the building was remodelled resulting in the removal of the curved timber brackets to the shade (which was characteristic of nineteenth century railway architecture) and the substitution of ladder frame brackets carried on fretted struts and similar spandrels to the shelter shed with shades to both sides of the building located on an island platform.

By 1960 the Mirani railway station consisted of the station building, lamp room, quarters, loading bank, goods shed, whim derrick and forkline with trucking yards.

The Mackay Railway, from Kowari to Netherdale, officially closed on 19 December 1977 after being damaged by flooding. In 1981 a lease of the quarters was offered to the Pioneer Valley Historical Society.

In 1988, the station building and residence were to be sold for removal. The Mirani Shire Council was successful in obtaining a grant through the Bicentennial funding to adapt the former station building for reuse as a museum. The grant allowed for the former station building to remain on site. The section of the Mackay Railway between Marian and Finch Hatton (which included the Mirani Railway Station) closed on 2 October 1990. This is becoming a common pattern in sugar districts as industry deregulation results in cane lands going out of production and mills closing. Many tram and rail lines are disappearing and road transport is taking an increasing share of the harvest to the mills.

The former station building continues to be cared for by the Mackay Regional Council (the successor to the Mirani Shire Council) which owns the property.

== Description ==
The Mirani Railway Station is a single storey, timber-framed building, set on low timber stumps, clad with timber weatherboards. The building has a gable roof clad with corrugated iron. Timber louvered ventilators are located high in the western and eastern elevations. The roof extends on both the northern and southern sides of the building creating shade to these sides.

The fretted shelter shed spandrels running the length of the structure on the northern and southern sides compare with the Finch Hatton railway station, further west along the line.

Spaces that have previously been used as office area, ladies' room and closet (altered) are located to either side of the shelter shed area. Booking windows face the shelter area.

Station name boards are extant along the railway line.

A single storey timber trolley shed is located approximately 60 metres (200 ft) to the east of the railway station building.

The children's playground area structures and equipment are not considered to be of cultural heritage significance.

== Heritage listing ==
The former Mirani railway station was listed on the Queensland Heritage Register on 7 July 2005 having satisfied the following criteria.

The place is important in demonstrating the evolution or pattern of Queensland's history.

The Mirani railway station building is important as a substantially intact example of a country branch line station building, demonstrating the importance of the Queensland sugar industry's railway networks and the gradual loss of this network following industry deregulation and a shift to road transport of harvested cane. Located on the Pioneer Valley Line of the Mackay Railway, the Mirani railway station building is an extant reminder of the growth of the district as pre-eminent cane growing area in the late 19th and early 20th century. The opening of the area through the establishment of the railway also prompted the development of the timber industry.

The Mirani railway station building is further significant as the earliest surviving building on the Mackay Railway and is closely comparable with Finch Hatton Railway Station building, further to the west.

The place is important in demonstrating the principal characteristics of a particular class of cultural places.

With spaces formerly comprising an office area, shelter area with shade to both sides of the building and ticket windows facing the shelter areas, the Mirani Railway Station building is a good example of a country branch line timber railway building. Its decorative fretted shelter shed spandrels compare with the Finch Hatton Railway Station building.
