= Kinchant Dam, Queensland =

Kinchant Dam
- Suburb
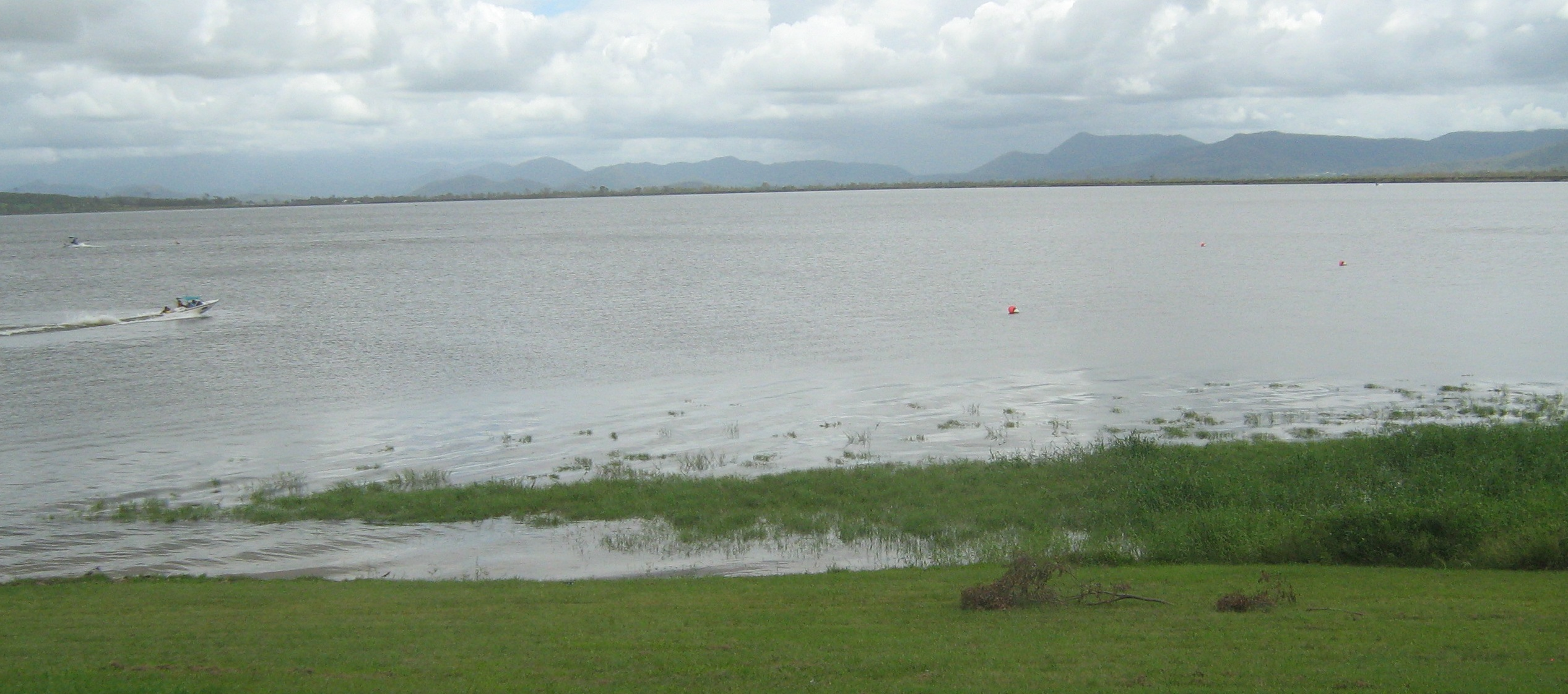
- Lake Kinchant

- Interactive map of Kinchant Dam
- Coordinates: 21.2308°S 148.9077°E
- Country: Australia
- State: Queensland
- LGA: Mackay Region
- Location: 7.1 km (4.4 mi) SE of Mirani; 40.1 km (24.9 mi) W of Mackay; 968 km (601 mi) NNW of Brisbane

Government
  - State electorate: Mirani
  - Federal division: Capricornia

Area
  - Total: 37.5 km^{2} (14.5 sq mi)

Population
  - Total: 183 (2021 census)
  - Density: 4.880/km^{2} (12.64/sq mi)
- Time zone: UTC+10:00 (AEST)
- Postcode: 4741
Suburbs around Kinchant Dam
Mirani	Mirani	Marian
Mia Mia	Kinchant Dam	North Eton
Pinevale	Brightly	Eton

Kinchant Dam is a rural locality in the Mackay Region, Queensland, Australia. In the 2021 census, Kinchant Dam had a population of 183 people.

== Geography ==
The water storage facility named Lake Kinchant created by the Kinchant Dam is wholly within the locality. The dam is built on Sandy Creek to provide irrigation and town water. However most of the water in the lake does not come from Sandy Creek but is pumped from the Pioneer River at Mirani Weir into an 8-kilometre (5.0 mi) channel into the lake.

Mount Kinchant is in the south-west of the locality (21.2375°S 148.9141°E) and rises to 415 metres (1,362 ft) above sea level. Much of the mountain is within the Mount Kinchant Conservation Park.

The locality is 36 kilometres (22 miles) south-west of Mackay via the Bruce Highway, Peak Downs Highway, North Eton Road, Marian – Eton Road (State Route 5) and Kinchant Dam Road.

== History ==
Francis Charlton Kinchant (1790–1815) was killed in the Battle of Waterloo. His middle name (Charlton) was his grandmothers maiden surname. While it may not have been a well-used given name, his heroic death may have inspired another Kinchant (not necessarily a relative) to name his son “Francis Charlton”. In 1856 a man named Francis Charlton Kinchant arrived in Australia. On 18 March 1867 he married Jane Martin in Mackay, supposedly the first wedding in that town. His connection to the Mackay district is unknown but it is likely that Mount Kinchant was named for him. He died in Mackay in 1913.

The dam was built in 1977.

== Demographics ==
In the 2016 census, Kinchant Dam had a population of 123 people.

In the 2021 census, Kinchant Dam had a population of 183 people.

== Education ==
Kinchant Dam Outdoor Education Centre is an Outdoor and Environmental Education Centre at 685 Kinchant Dam Road (21.2155°S 148.9043°E). It offers camping programs to develop teamwork, leadership, and resilience.

There are no mainstream schools in the locality. The nearest government primary schools are North Eton State School in neighbouring North Eton to the east, Eton State School in neighbouring Eton to the south-east and Mirani State School in neighbouring Mirani to the north. The nearest government secondary school is Mirani State High School, also in Mirani.

== Attractions ==
Kinchant Dam offers opportunities for fishing and boating. There is a boat ramp into Kinchant Dam on Kinchant Dam Road (21.2167°S 148.8943°E), which is managed by the SunWater. There is also a downhill mountain bike circuit.

There is a lookout and picnic and barbecue facilities. Camping is available.

== See also ==
- List of Queensland Conservation Parks
