= Epsom, Queensland =

Epsom
- Suburb
- Interactive map of Epsom
- Coordinates: 21.4816°S 148.8222°E
- Country: Australia
- State: Queensland
- LGA: Isaac Region
- Location: 59.3 km (36.8 mi) S of Mirani; 66.8 km (41.5 mi) SW of Mackay; 76.6 km (47.6 mi) W of Sarina; 128 km (80 mi) NE of Moranbah; 987 km (613 mi) NNW of Brisbane

Government
  - State electorate: Burdekin
  - Federal division: Capricornia

Area
  - Total: 439.4 km^{2} (169.7 sq mi)

Population
  - Total: 21 (2021 census)
  - Density: 0.0478/km^{2} (0.1238/sq mi)
- Time zone: UTC+10:00 (AEST)
- Postcode: 4741
Suburbs around Epsom
Pinevale	Hazledean	Blue Mountain
Mount Britton	Epsom	Blue Mountain
Nebo	Nebo	Blue Mountain

Epsom is a rural locality in the Isaac Region, Queensland, Australia. In the 2021 census, Epsom had a population of 21 people.

== Geography ==
The locality is loosely bounded to the east by Whitehorse Mountains and Blue Mountains.

The Peak Downs Highway enters the locality from the north-east (Blue Mountain) and exits to the south-west (Nebo).

Epsom has the following mountains:

- Mount Spencer (21.4587°S 148.8230°E), rising to 538 metres (1,765 ft) above sea level
- Mount Shields (21.4609°S 148.8753°E) 518 metres (1,699 ft)
- Mount Sugarloaf (21.5549°S 148.8063°E) 427 metres (1,401 ft)
- Mount Maryvale (21.5567°S 148.7808°E) 420 metres (1,380 ft)

Epsom State Forest 2 is in the north-west of the locality, while Epsom State Forest 3 is in the south-east of the locality. Apart from these protected areas, the land use is predominantly grazing on native vegetation with a small amount of crop growing.

== History ==
In early 1865, Charles Heineman was granted a license for a public house near Denison's Creek, which he called the Retreat Hotel, possibly after the Spencers Retreat pastoral run nearby.

== Demographics ==
In the 2016 census, Epsom had a population of 9 people.

In the 2021 census, Epsom had a population of 21 people.

== Education ==
There are no schools in Epsom. The nearest government primary schools are Eton State School in Eton to the north-east and Nebo State School in neighbouring Nebo to the south. The nearest government secondary schools are Mirani State High School in Mirani to the north and Sarina State High School in Sarina to the east; however, students in the south-west of Epsom may be too distant to attend either of these schools; the alternatives are distance education and boarding school.

== Amenities ==
The Retreat Hotel provides accommodation and meals at 20601 Peak Downs Highway (21.4785°S 148.8116°E).
