= Hazledean, Queensland =

Hazledean
- Suburb
- Interactive map of Hazledean
- Coordinates: 21.37°S 148.9519°E
- Country: Australia
- State: Queensland
- LGA: Mackay Region
- Location: 15.7 km (9.8 mi) SSW of Eton; 39.5 km (24.5 mi) SSE of Mirani; 47.1 km (29.3 mi) SW of Mackay CBD; 983 km (611 mi) NNW of Brisbane

Government
  - State electorate: Mirani
  - Federal division: Capricornia

Area
  - Total: 52.5 km^{2} (20.3 sq mi)

Population
  - Total: 27 (2021 census)
  - Density: 0.514/km^{2} (1.332/sq mi)
- Time zone: UTC+10:00 (AEST)
- Postcode: 4741
Suburbs around Hazledean
Pinevale	Eton	Eton
Pinevale	Hazledean	Eton
Epsom	Epsom	Blue Mountain

Hazledean is a rural locality in the Mackay Region, Queensland, Australia. In the 2021 census, Hazledean had a population of 27 people.

== Geography ==
Black Waterhole Creek enters the locality from the east (Eton) and flows north-west through the locality, briefly forming part of the northern boundary of the locality, before flowing through the locality to become the north-western boundary and exit to the north-west (Pinevale), where it becomes a tributary of the Pioneer River.

The Peak Downs Highway enters the locality from the north (Eton) and then forms part of the eastern boundary of the locality before passing through the locality and exiting to the south-east (Blue Mountain).

The Ben Mohr State Forest extends from the south-east to the locality through to the north-west and beyond into neighbouring Pinevale, Brightly, and Eton. Apart from this large protected area, the main land use in the locality is grazing on native vegetation, but much of the land is undeveloped.

== History ==
In October 1864, James Ready applied for a publican's licence for the Traveller's Rest Hotel along Black Waterhole Creek. A hotel (later known as the Range Hotel) operated on that site until 2 March 1990 when it was burned down.

On 18 August 1868, 32 town lots and 2 suburban losts were sold in the Town of Hazeldean (21.3792°S 148.9478°E).

== Demographics ==
In the 2016 census, Hazledean had a population of 19 people.

In the 2021 census, Hazledean had a population of 27 people.

== Education ==
There are no schools in Hazledean. The nearest government primary schools are Eton State School in neighbouring Eton to the north and Mirani State School in Mirani to the north-west. The nearest government secondary school is Mirani State High School, also in Mirani.

== Facilities ==
Hazeldon-Eton Range Cemetery is on the eastern side of the junction of Holmes and Ready Streets and to the west of Black Waterhole Creek (21.3789°S 148.9502°E).
