= Lloyd baronets of Milfield (1708) =

Escutcheon of the Lloyd baronets of Milfield

The Lloyd baronetcy, of Milfield in the County of Cardigan, was created in the Baronetage of Great Britain on 1 May 1708 for Charles Lloyd, Member of Parliament for Cardigan. The title became extinct on the death of the 3rd Baronet in 1750.

== Lloyd baronets, of Milfield (1708) ==
- Sir Charles Lloyd, 1st Baronet (c. 1662–1723)
- Sir Charles Cornwallis Lloyd, 2nd Baronet (c. 1706–1729)
- Sir Lucius Christianus Lloyd, 3rd Baronet (c. 1710–1750)

== Notes ==
Baronetage of Great Britain
Preceded by Goodere baronets	Lloyd baronets of Milfield; 1 May 1708	Succeeded by Cairnes baronets
