= Blue Mountain, Queensland =

Blue Mountain
- Suburb
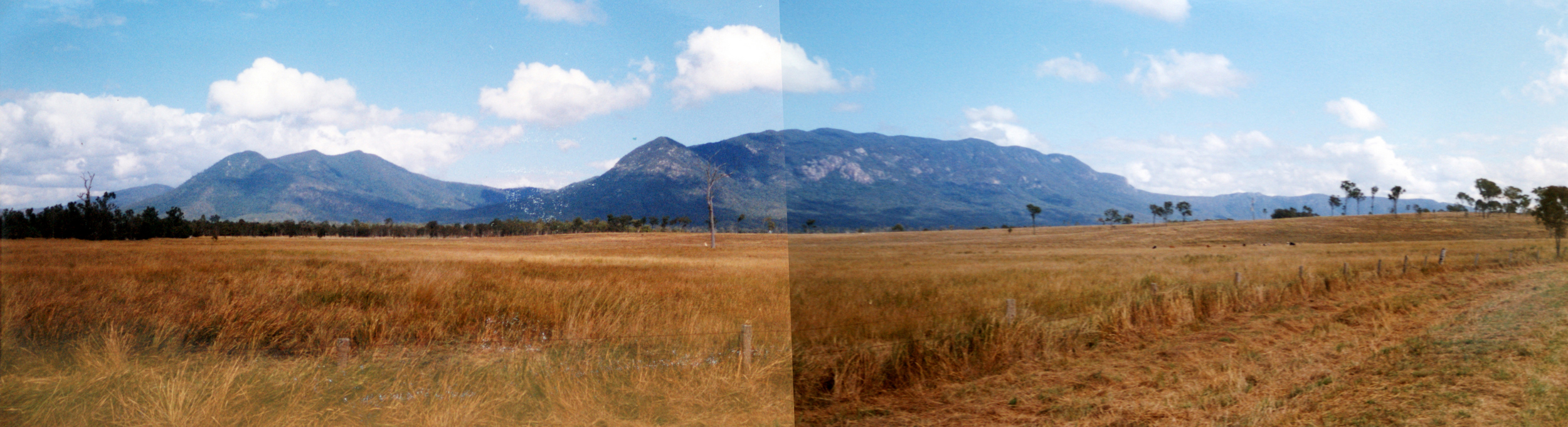
- Blue Mountain, 2009

- Interactive map of Blue Mountain
- Coordinates: 21.4577°S 148.9980°E
- Country: Australia
- State: Queensland
- LGA: Isaac Region
- Location: 43.6 km (27.1 mi) S of Mirani; 49.1 km (30.5 mi) SW of Mackay; 58.2 km (36.2 mi) W of Sarina; 348 km (216 mi) NNW of Rockhampton; 983 km (611 mi) NNW of Brisbane

Government
  - State electorate: Burdekin
  - Federal division: Capricornia

Area
  - Total: 422.7 km^{2} (163.2 sq mi)

Population
  - Total: 83 (2021 census)
  - Density: 0.1964/km^{2} (0.5086/sq mi)
- Time zone: UTC+10:00 (AEST)
- Postcode: 4737
Suburbs around Blue Mountain
| Hazledean | Eton; Oakenden | Sunnyside |
| Epsom | Blue Mountain | Sarina |
| Nebo | Koumala | Sarina Range |

Blue Mountain is a rural locality in the Isaac Region, Queensland, Australia. In the 2021 census, Blue Mountain had a population of 83 people.

== Geography ==
The Peak Downs Highway runs through the north-western extremity.

Blue Mountain has the following mountains:

- Blue Mountain (21.5631°S 148.9566°E) 620 metres (2,030 ft)
- Pine Mountain (21.6356°S 148.9928°E) 730 metres (2,400 ft)

The Marlborough–Sarina Road runs across the southeast corner.

== History ==
Blue Mountain Provisional School opened in July 1943. In 1958 it became Blue Mountain State School. The school closed in 1963. It was on Blue Mountain Road (approx 21.5736°S 149.0254°E).

== Demographics ==
In the 2016 census, Blue Mountain had a population of 92 people.

In the 2021 census, Blue Mountain had a population of 83 people.

== Education ==
There are no schools in Blue Mountain. The nearest government primary schools are Eton State School in neighbouring Eton to the north and Swayneville State School in neighbouring Sarina to the east. The nearest government secondary schools are Mirani State High School in Mirani to the north and Sarina State High School in Sarina.
