= Lucius Lloyd =

British aristocrat

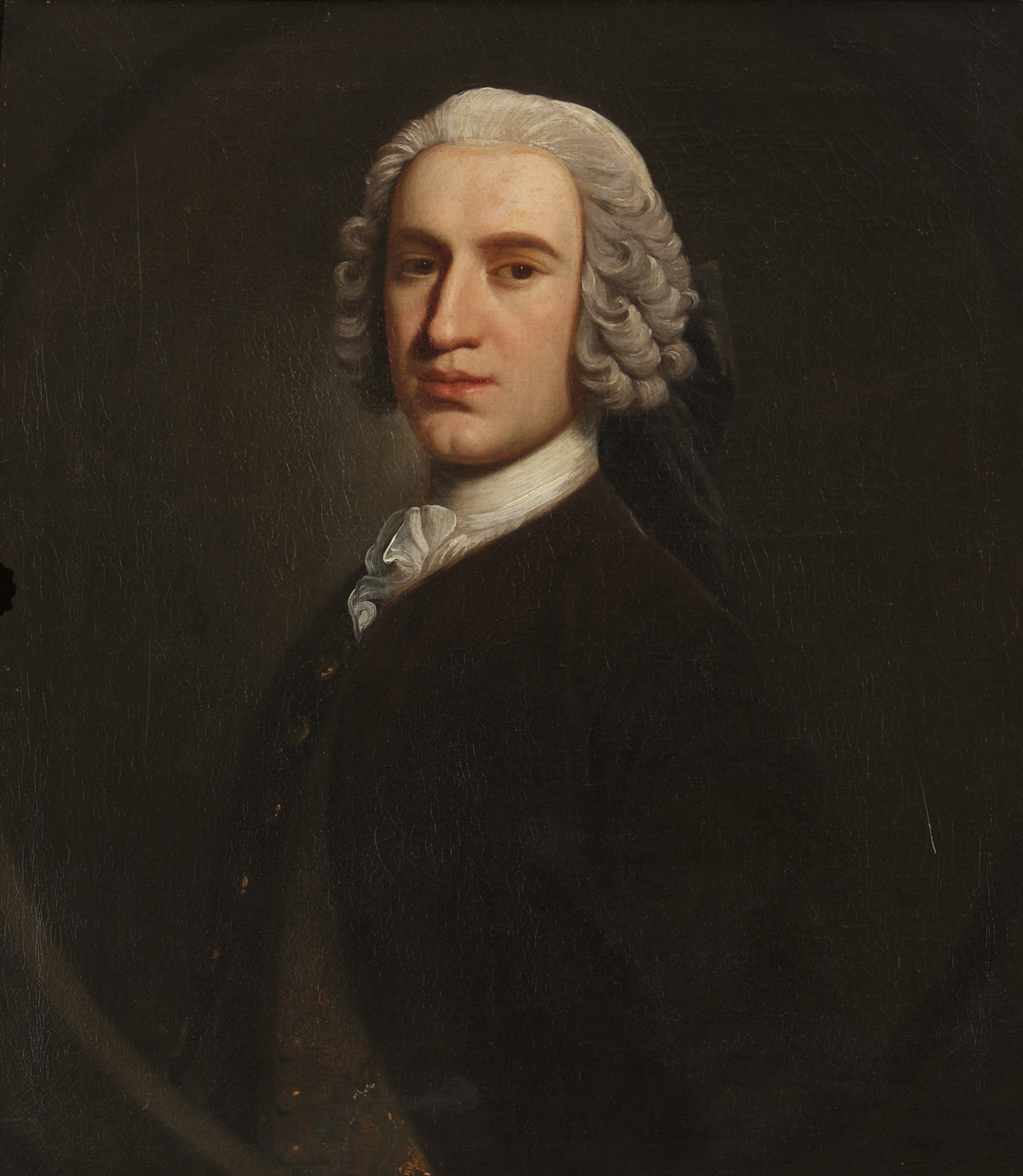
Portrait by Allan Ramsay, 1745

Sir Lucius Christianus Lloyd, 3rd Baronet (c. 1710 – 17 January 1750) was a British aristocrat.

He was the son of Sir Charles Lloyd, 1st Baronet, of Milfield and his second wife Frances Cornwallis.

He became a baronet on the death of his childless elder brother, Charles, on 25 February 1729. He was High Sheriff of Cardiganshire 1746–47. Before 1741, he married Anne Lloyd, the daughter of Walter Lloyd of Peterwell, and died without issue in 1750. His estates were inherited by his widow's family, and the title became extinct.

Baronetage of Great Britain
Preceded by Charles Cornwallis Lloyd	Baronet (of Milfield); 1729–1750	Extinct
