= Mia Mia =

Mia Mia may refer to:

- Mia-mia, a temporary shelter used by Indigenous Australians
- Mia Mia, Queensland, Australia
- Mia Mia, Victoria, a town in Australia

== See also ==
- Mieh Mieh, Lebanon
