= Lloyd baronets =

Set index for Lloyd baronets

There have been nine baronetcies created for persons with the surname Lloyd, three in the Baronetage of England, three in the Baronetage of Great Britain and three in the Baronetage of the United Kingdom. Two of the creations are extant as of 2026.

- Lloyd baronets of Yale (1647)
- Lloyd baronets of Garth (1661)
- Lloyd baronets of Woking (1662)
- Lloyd baronets of Milfield (1708)
- Lloyd baronets of Peterwell (1763): see Sir Herbert Lloyd, 1st Baronet (1719–1769)
- Lloyd baronets of Pengwerra (1778): see Baron Mostyn
- Lloyd baronets of Lancing (1831): see Sir James Lloyd, 1st Baronet (1762–1844)
- Lloyd baronets of Bronwydd (1863)
- Lloyd baronets of Rhu (1960)
