= Lloyd baronets of Garth (1661) =

Escutcheon of the Lloyd baronets of Garth

The Lloyd baronetcy, of Garth in the County of Montgomery, was created in the Baronetage of England on 10 May 1661 for the merchant and politician Charles Lloyd. He was Member of Parliament for Montgomery in 1659.

The 3rd Baronet was High Sheriff of Montgomeryshire between 1706 and 1707. The title became extinct on his death in 1743.

== Lloyd baronets, of Garth (1661) ==
- Sir Charles Lloyd, 1st Baronet (died c. 1678).
- Sir Charles Lloyd, 2nd Baronet (died c. 1691)
- Sir Charles Lloyd, 3rd Baronet (died 1743). He died without leaving a male heir, and the title became extinct.
