= Lt Thomas Armstrong Memorial =

- Location within Queensland Location within Australia
- 21.1601°S 148.8641°E
- Location: Victoria Street, Mirani, Mackay Region, Queensland, Australia

History
- Design period: 1914–1919 (World War I)
- Built: 1918

Queensland Heritage Register
- Official name: Lt Thomas Armstrong Memorial, The Valley Uniting Church
- Type: state heritage (built)
- Designated: 21 October 1992
- Reference no.: 600724
- Significant period: 1917 (historical, fabric)
- Significant components: memorial – plaque

Lt Thomas Armstrong Memorial is a heritage-listed memorial at Victoria Street, Mirani, Mackay Region, Queensland, Australia. It was built in 1918. It was added to the Queensland Heritage Register on 21 October 1992.

== History ==
This memorial is unusual in that it is dedicated to the memory of an individual soldier. It marks the death on 12 October 1917 of Lieutenant Thomas Acheson (Tom) Armstrong of the 33rd Battalion who was killed in action at the age of 26 at the First Battle of Passchendaele at Zonnebeke near Passchendaele, Flanders during the First World War. Prior to enlisting at the start of 1916, Armstrong was a medical student at the University of Sydney.

Armstrong's family lived on a farm between Marian and Mirani. The memorial was erected behind the altar at St James Presbyterian Church (later Uniting Church) at Marian, a timber church located on Anzac Avenue near the Marian sugar mill. The mason who created the memorial is unknown. It was mounted behind the pulpit on the northern side of the church.

The memorial was unveiled in a ceremony on Saturday 14 September 1918 by Major Stuart Key. After the unveiling, a bugler played the Last Post, followed by a brief silence and then the congregation sang God Save the King.

By 1991 the church was no longer in use and it was proposed that the Marian State School purchase the site for its use. Local church services were relocated to St Stephens Uniting Church at the nearby township of Mirani and the memorial was transferred from St James church to St Stephens, Mirani.

Thomas Armstrong was also memorialised at the Menin Gate Memorial at Ypres, Belgium, where memorialisation is reserved for Commonwealth soldiers of World War I whose graves cannot be identified.

== Description ==
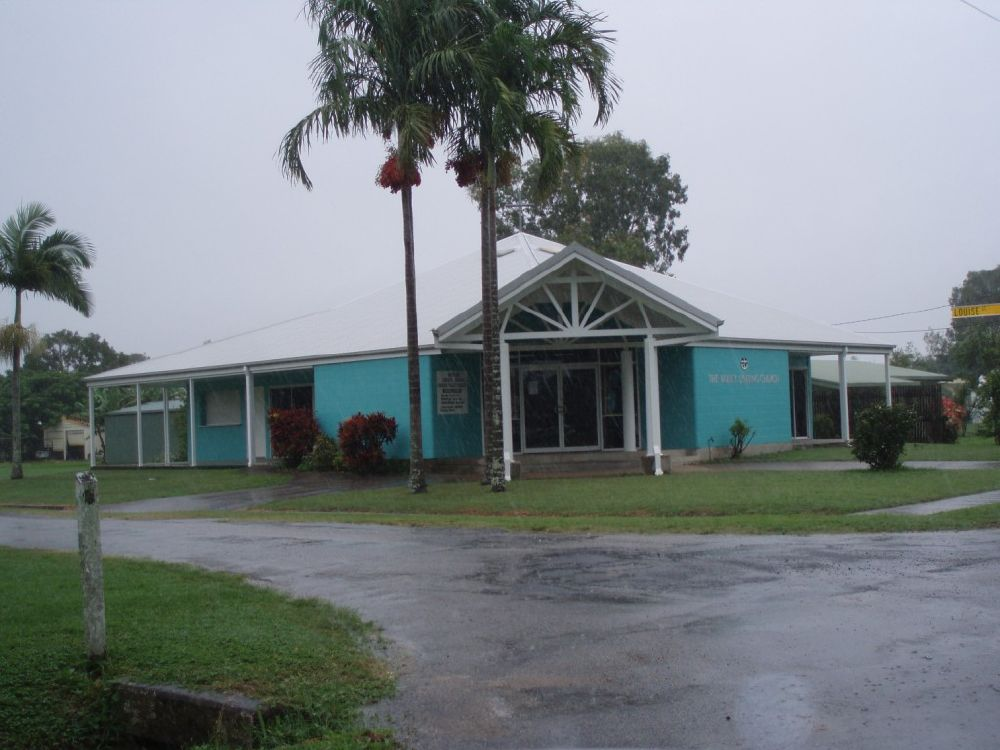
Memorial is within St Stephen's Uniting Church, Mirani, 2009

The memorial is a tablet of black polished stone, measuring 104 by 64 centimetres (41 in × 25 in) and forms the base for two white marble reliefs. The lower one is in the form of a scroll and sword and has the inscription:

In Loving Memory of Lieut Thomas A Armstrong 33rd Battalion AIF who was killed in action near Passchendaele, Flanders on 12th October 1917 aged 26 years. Greater love hath no man than this.

The upper white marble relief bears the crest of the 33rd Battalion in polychrome and its Latin motto, Strenue Percute (translated strike vigorously).

== Heritage listing ==
Lt Thomas Armstrong Memorial was listed on the Queensland Heritage Register on 21 October 1992 having satisfied the following criteria.

The place is important in demonstrating the evolution or pattern of Queensland's history.

The Armstrong Memorial is important is demonstrating the pattern and evolution of Queensland's history, as a memorial to the participation and death in battle of a member of the Marian community in the First World War. In its depiction of martial symbols such as the sword and battalion crest, it reflects a pride in Australia's participation in the war as a nation within the Empire as well as personal loss.

The place demonstrates rare, uncommon or endangered aspects of Queensland's cultural heritage.

The Armstrong Memorial is rare in Queensland as a privately erected war memorial to an individual soldier.

The place is important because of its aesthetic significance.

The Armstrong memorial has aesthetic value as a well designed and good quality war memorial publicly displayed in the church.
