= Pinevale, Queensland =

Pinevale
- Suburb
- Interactive map of Pinevale
- Coordinates: 21.3108°S 148.8327°E
- Country: Australia
- State: Queensland
- LGA: Mackay Region
- Location: 24.7 km (15.3 mi) S of Mirani; 61.8 km (38.4 mi) WSW of Mackay CBD; 397 km (247 mi) SE of Townsville; 1,001 km (622 mi) NNW of Brisbane

Government
  - State electorate: Mirani
  - Federal division: Capricornia

Area
  - Total: 165.9 km^{2} (64.1 sq mi)

Population
  - Total: 51 (2021 census)
  - Density: 0.3074/km^{2} (0.796/sq mi)
- Time zone: UTC+10:00 (AEST)
- Postcode: 4754
Suburbs around Pinevale
Septimus	Mia Mia	Brightly
Septimus	Pinevale	Eton
Mount Britton	Epsom	Hazledean

Pinevale is a rural locality in the Mackay Region, Queensland, Australia. In the 2021 census, Pinevale had a population of 51 people.

== Geography ==
Pinevale has the following mountains:

- Ben Mohr (21.2748°S 148.8572°E) 746 metres (2,448 ft)
- Blue Mountain (21.2645°S 148.8752°E) 441 metres (1,447 ft)
- Mount McBryde (21.2888°S 148.8668°E) 549 metres (1,801 ft)

The Ben Mohr State Forest is in the north-east of the locality and extends into neighbouring Brightly, Eton, and Hazledean. The Mia Mia State Forest is in the south of the locality. Apart from these protected areas, the land use in the south of the locality is grazing on native vegetation, while the north of the locality is a mixture of grazing and growing crops (mostly sugarcane). There is a cane tramway to transport the harvested sugarcane to the local sugar mill.

== Demographics ==
In the 2016 census, Pinevale had a population of 53 people.

In the 2021 census, Pinevale had a population of 51 people.

== Education ==
There are no schools in Pinevale. The nearest government primary and secondary schools are Mirani State School and Mirani State High School, both in Mirani to the north.
