= Charlie Lloyd (rugby league) =

Australian rugby league footballer

Personal information
- Full name: Charles Thomas Lloyd
- Born: 11 June 1906 Sydney, New South Wales, Australia
- Died: 14 October 1934 (aged 28) Sydney, New South Wales, Australia

Playing information
- Position: Front row
Club
Years	Team	Pld	T	G	FG	P
1930–33	South Sydney	13	3	0	0	9

Charles Thomas Lloyd (11 June 1906 – 14 October 1934) was an Australian rugby league footballer.

== Biography ==
Raised in Sydney, Lloyd was a fullback for his schoolboys years at St Benedict's, where he received coaching from former international forward Bert Gray, but developed into a forward despite his relatively light build.

Lloyd's first grade career with South Sydney was largely confined to the 1930 NSWRFL season, when he displaced Carl Eggen in the front row, and played well enough to earn representative honours for Sydney ("Metropolis"). His younger brother Billy also played briefly for the Rabbitohs during this time.

In 1932, Lloyd and his sister shared the top prize of £5000 in the NSW state lottery.

Lloyd was killed in 1934 after colliding with another vehicle while driving on Homebush Road.
