= Sir Charles Lloyd, 1st Baronet, of Garth =

Welsh merchant and politician

Sir Charles Lloyd, 1st Baronet (died c. 1678), was a Welsh merchant and politician who sat in the House of Commons between 1654 and 1659.

Lloyd was the grandson of Humphrey Lloyd of Leighton, the first High Sheriff of Montgomeryshire and great-great-grandson of Sir Gruffudd Vychan. He was a member of the Worshipful Company of Drapers and engaged in trade in the City of London. He was commissioner of customs for Montgomeryshire from 1645 to 1649. In 1651 he was elected alderman for Bishopsgate ward and was elected Sheriff of London but does not appear to have served.

In 1654, Lloyd was elected Member of Parliament for Montgomeryshire in the First Protectorate Parliament. He was Master of the Drapers Company and a City Auditor from 1655 to 1656. In 1656 he was re-elected MP for Montgomeryshire in the Second Protectorate Parliament. He may have entered the Inner Temple in November 1657. In 1659 he was elected MP for Montgomery in the Third Protectorate Parliament.

Lloyd promoted the English Restoration and was created a baronet of Garth in the County of Montgomery, on 10 May 1661. He was Deputy-Governor of the Irish Society in 1663. In 1669 he was High Sheriff of Montgomeryshire.

Baronetage of England
New creation	Baronet (of Garth); 1661–c. 1678	Succeeded by Charles Lloyd
