= Charles Cornwallis Lloyd =

Former British Aristocrat and Second Baronet of Milifield

Sir Charles Cornwallis Lloyd, 2nd Baronet (c. 1706 – 25 February 1729) was a British aristocrat.

He was the eldest son of Sir Charles Lloyd, 1st Baronet, of Milfield and his second wife Frances Cornwallis. He was born in about 1706 at Ludlow, was admitted to Lincoln's Inn on 10 March 1720, and matriculated at Christ Church, Oxford on 10 June 1721, aged 15.

He succeeded to the baronetcy of his father on 28 December 1723. He married Mrs Jennings, a widow of Somerset, in 1727 and died without issue on 25 February 1729 at the age of 24. His widow married George Speke and died in July 1754.

He was succeeded in the baronetcy by his younger brother, Lucius Lloyd.

Baronetage of Great Britain
Preceded by Charles Lloyd	Baronet (of Milfield); 1723–1729	Succeeded by Lucius Lloyd
