= Lloyd baronets of Yale (1647) =

Escutcheon of the Lloyd baronets of Yale

The Lloyd Baronetcy, of Yale in the County of Denbigh, was created in the Baronetage of England on 21 June 1647 for Evan Lloyd, a Royalist of the English Civil War. The title became extinct on the death of the 2nd Baronet in 1700.

== Lloyd baronets, of Yale (1647) ==
- Sir Evan Lloyd, 1st Baronet (c. 1622–1663)
- Sir Evan Lloyd, 2nd Baronet (c. 1654–1700). He died leaving no male heir, and the title became extinct.
