= Lloyd baronets of Woking (1662) =

Escutcheon of the Lloyd baronets of Woking

The Lloyd baronetcy, of Woking in the County of Surrey, was created in the Baronetage of England on 28 February 1662 for John Lloyd, Member of Parliament for Carmarthenshire. He was the son of Griffith Lloyd of Fforest Brechfa and his wife Joan Wogan, daughter of John Wogan of Stonehall, Pembrokeshire. The title became extinct on the death of the 2nd Baronet in 1674.

== Lloyd baronets, of Woking (1662) ==
- Sir John Lloyd, 1st Baronet (c. 1617–1664)
- Sir John Lloyd, 2nd Baronet (c. 1651–1674)
