= Lloyd baronets of Bronwydd (1863) =

Escutcheon of the Lloyd baronets of Bronwydd

The Lloyd baronetcy, of Bronwydd in the County of Cardigan, was created in the Baronetage of the United Kingdom on 21 January 1863 for the Welsh Liberal politician Thomas Lloyd. The title became extinct on the death of the 2nd Baronet in 1933.

== Lloyd baronets, of Bronwydd (1863) ==
- Sir Thomas Davies Lloyd (1820–1877)
- Sir Marteine Owen Mowbray Lloyd, 2nd Baronet (1851–1933)
