= Charles Lloyd (cricketer) =

English cricketer (1789–1876)

Charles Spencer Lloyd (11 August 1789 – 20 June 1876) was an English first-class cricketer active 1819 to 1850 who played for Marylebone Cricket Club (MCC). He was born in Leaton Knolls, Shropshire and died in Leatherhead. Henry J. Lloyd was his brother.
