= Brightly, Queensland =

Brightly
- Suburb
- Interactive map of Brightly
- Coordinates: 21.2741°S 148.8911°E
- Country: Australia
- State: Queensland
- LGA: Mackay Region
- Location: 16.8 km (10.4 mi) SSE of Mirani; 37.6 km (23.4 mi) SW of Mackay; 985 km (612 mi) NNW of Brisbane

Government
  - State electorate: Mirani
  - Federal division: Capricornia

Area
  - Total: 40.4 km^{2} (15.6 sq mi)

Population
  - Total: 52 (2021 census)
  - Density: 1.287/km^{2} (3.33/sq mi)
- Time zone: UTC+10:00 (AEST)
- Postcode: 4741
Suburbs around Brightly
Mia Mia	Kinchant Dam	North Eton
Pinevale	Brightly	Eton
Pinevale	Eton	Eton

Brightly is a rural locality in the Mackay Region, Queensland, Australia. In the 2021 census, Brightly had a population of 52 people.

== History ==
Brightley State School opened on 23 February 1925 and closed on 9 December 1988. The spelling of the school name differs from the locality name. The school was at 1843 Mirani Eton Road (21.2588°S 148.9196°E) and the school building is now used as a private residence.

== Demographics ==
In the 2016 census, Brightly had a population of 70 people.

In the 2021 census, Brightly had a population of 52 people.

== Education ==
There are no schools in Brightly. The nearest government schools are Eton State School in neighbouring Eton to the east and Mirani State School in Mirani to the north. The nearest government secondary school is Mirani State High School in Mirani.
