= Mia Mia, Queensland =

Mia Mia
- Suburb
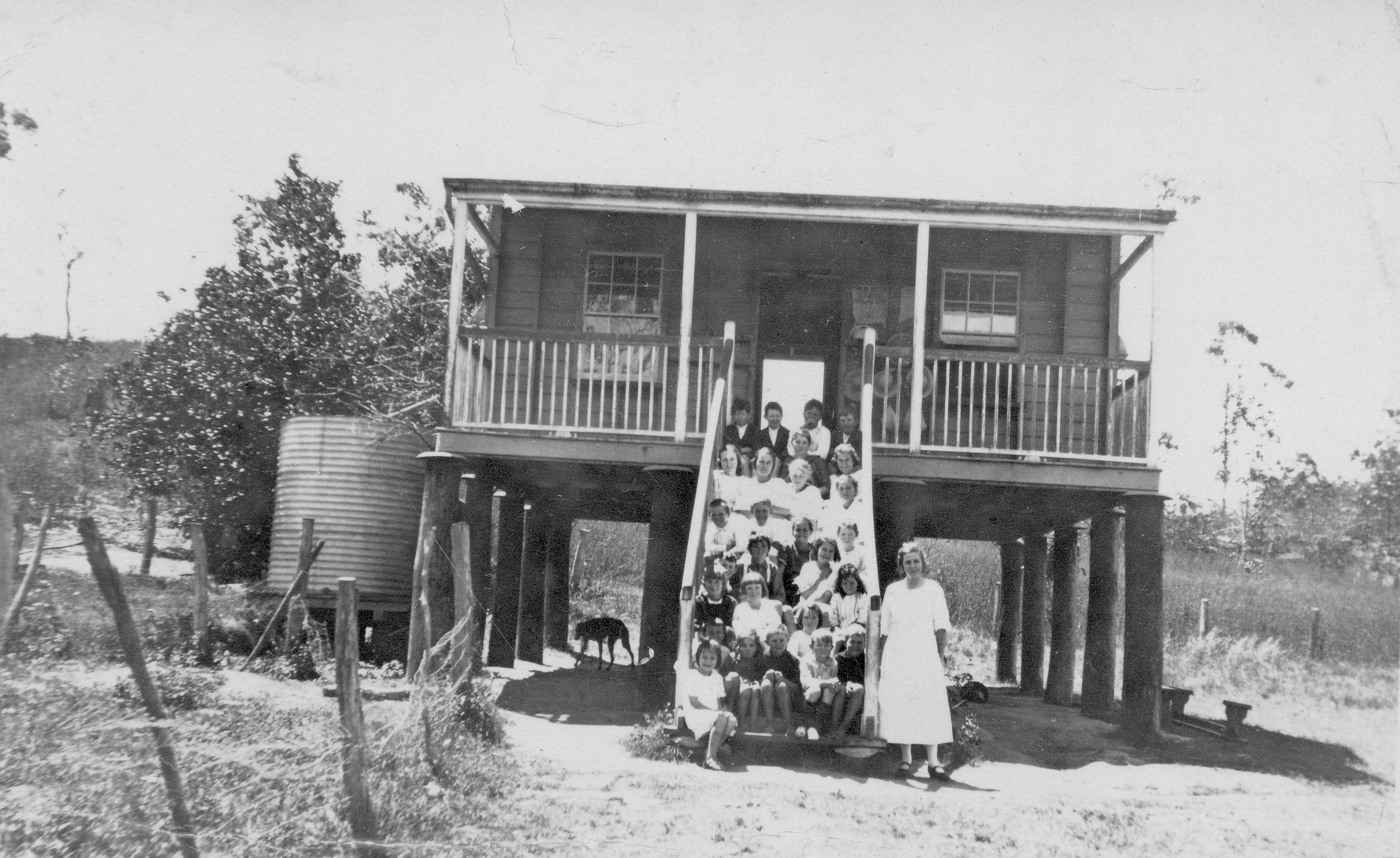
- Mia Mia State School, circa 1929

- Interactive map of Mia Mia
- Coordinates: 21.2288°S 148.8169°E
- Country: Australia
- State: Queensland
- LGA: Mackay Region
- Location: 8.6 km (5.3 mi) SSE of Mirani; 45.6 km (28.3 mi) WSW of Mackay CBD; 989 km (615 mi) NNW of Brisbane

Government
  - State electorate: Mirani
  - Federal division: Capricornia

Area
  - Total: 25.8 km^{2} (10.0 sq mi)

Population
  - Total: 118 (2021 census)
  - Density: 4.574/km^{2} (11.85/sq mi)
- Time zone: UTC+10:00 (AEST)
- Postcode: 4754
Suburbs around Mia Mia
Septimus	Mirani	Mirani
Septimus	Mia Mia	Kinchant Dam
Pinevale	Pinevale	Brightly

Mia Mia is a rural locality in the Mackay Region, Queensland, Australia. In the 2021 census, Mia Mia had a population of 118 people.

== History ==
A provisional school for Mia Mia was approved on 17 April 1899. Tenders were called to erect the school building in May 1899. Mia Mia Provisional School opened on 22 January 1900 under head teacher Emma Milligan. On 1 January 1909, it became Mia Mia State School. The school building was relocated to a new site circa 1913. It closed on 7 July 1967, being replaced by a school transport service to take the children to Mirani State School. At that time, the school was on the north of the bend in the Mia Mia Connection Road (21.22383°S 148.81199°E). The school building was sold in 1969 and the land was sold in 1970.

== Demographics ==
In the 2016 census, Mia Mia had a population of 122 people.

In the 2021 census, Mia Mia had a population of 118 people.

== Education ==
There are no schools in Mia Mia. The nearest government primary schools are Mirani State School in neighbouring Mirani to the north and Gargett State School in Gargett to the north-west. The nearest government secondary school is Mirani State High School, also in Mirani.
