= Kinchant Dam =

Dam near Mackay, North Queensland, Australia

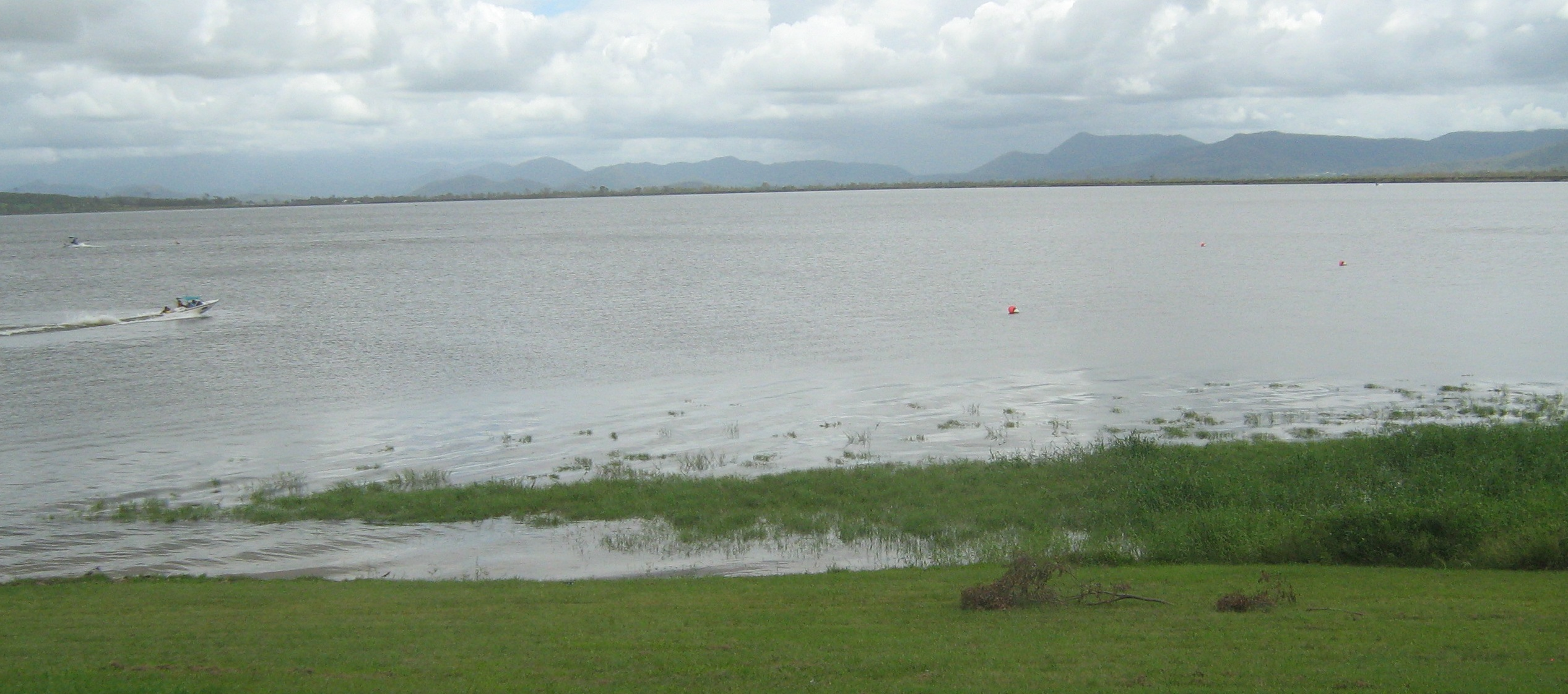
- The reservoir in 1980

- Location of the dam in Queensland
- Interactive map of Kinchant Dam
- Country: Australia
- Location: Mackay Region, North Queensland
- Coordinates: 21°12′40″S 148°53′49″E
- Purpose: Irrigation
- Status: Operational
- Construction began: 1974
- Opening date: 1986
- Operator: SunWater

Dam and spillways
- Type of dam: Embankment dam
- Impounds: Sandy Creek; Pioneer River
- Height (foundation): 22 m (72 ft)
- Length: 5,100 m (16,700 ft)
- Dam volume: 3,375×10^{3} m^{3} (119.2×10^{6} cu ft)
- Spillway type: Uncontrolled
- Spillway capacity: 350 m^{3}/s (12,000 cu ft/s)

Reservoir
- Creates: Lake Kinchant
- Total capacity: 72,235 ML (58,562 acre⋅ft)
- Catchment area: 30.84 km^{2} (11.91 sq mi)
- Surface area: 920 ha (2,300 acres)
- Maximum length: 5,325 m (17,470 ft)
- Maximum water depth: 18.1 m (59 ft)
- Normal elevation: 57.21 m (187.7 ft) AHD

The Kinchant Dam is an earth and rock-filled embankment dam across the north branch of Sandy Creek, in the locality of Kinchant Dam in the Mackay Region of North Queensland, Australia. Completed primarily in 1977, the dam created a 72,235-megalitre (2,551.0×10^{6} cu ft) reservoir, called Lake Kinchant for the purpose of irrigation.

== Overview ==
The dam was built on Sandy Creek to provide irrigation and town water. However most of the water in the lake does not come from Sandy Creek but is pumped from the Pioneer River at Mirani Weir into an 8-kilometre (5.0 mi) channel into the lake.

The dam was built in stages that started in 1974 and were substantially completed in 1977. Further modifications were completed by SunWater in 1986. The dam is named after local pioneer Frank Kinchant.

== Fishing ==
A Stocked Impoundment Permit is required to fish in the dam.

== See also ==
- List of dams and reservoirs in Australia
