= Sir Charles Lloyd, 1st Baronet, of Milfield =

British politician

Sir Charles Lloyd, 1st Baronet (1662 – 28 December 1723) was a British politician.

He was born at Forest Hill, Oxfordshire, the second illegitimate son of Sir Francis Lloyd and Bridget Leigh. He was educated at Jesus College, Oxford.

He served as member of parliament for Cardigan boroughs from 1698 to 1700 in the House of Commons of England. He was knighted on 24 November 1693 and created a baronet in 1708, for which he paid a fee of £1095. He served as High Sheriff of Cardiganshire in 1688–89 and High Sheriff of Carmarthenshire in 1715–16.

He married firstly, Jane, daughter and co-heir of Morgan Lloyd of Green Grove, Cardiganshire. They had two daughters. After her death, he married secondly, in or before 1706, Frances, daughter of Sir Francis Cornwallis of Abermarlais, Carmarthenshire. They had three sons and five daughters. One son and two daughters predeceased him. His second wife outlived him and died in or before 1753.

He died on 28 December 1723 at Milfield (Welsh: Maesyfelin), and was buried at Lampeter. He was succeeded in the baronetcy by his elder son, Sir Charles Cornwallis Lloyd, 2nd Baronet.

Parliament of England
| Preceded by John Lewis | Member of Parliament for Cardigan; 1698–1700 | Succeeded by Henry Lloyd |
Baronetage of Great Britain
| New creation | Baronet (of Milfield); 1708–1723 | Succeeded by Charles Lloyd |
