= North Eton, Queensland =

North Eton
- Suburb
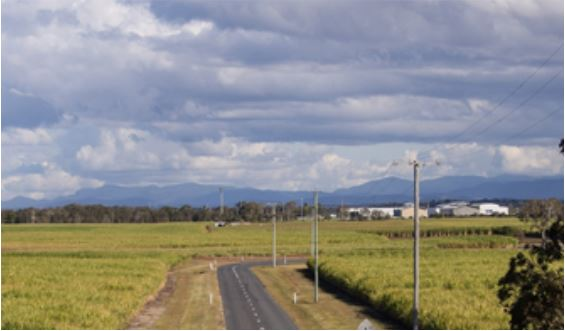
- North Eton landscape, 2025

- Interactive map of North Eton
- Coordinates: 21.2319°S 148.9491°E
- Country: Australia
- State: Queensland
- LGA: Mackay Region
- Location: 18.4 km (11.4 mi) SE of Mirani; 31.2 km (19.4 mi) NSW of Mackay CBD; 963 km (598 mi) NNW of Brisbane

Government
  - State electorate: Mirani
  - Federal division: Capricornia

Area
  - Total: 20.4 km^{2} (7.9 sq mi)

Population
  - Total: 189 (2021 census)
  - Density: 9.26/km^{2} (24.00/sq mi)
- Time zone: UTC+10:00 (AEST)
- Postcode: 4741
Suburbs around North Eton
Marian	Marian	Marian
Kinchant Dam	North Eton	Victoria Plains
Brightly	Eton	Eton

North Eton (also known as Eton North) is a rural locality in the Mackay Region, Queensland, Australia. In the 2021 census, North Eton had a population of 189 people.

== Geography ==
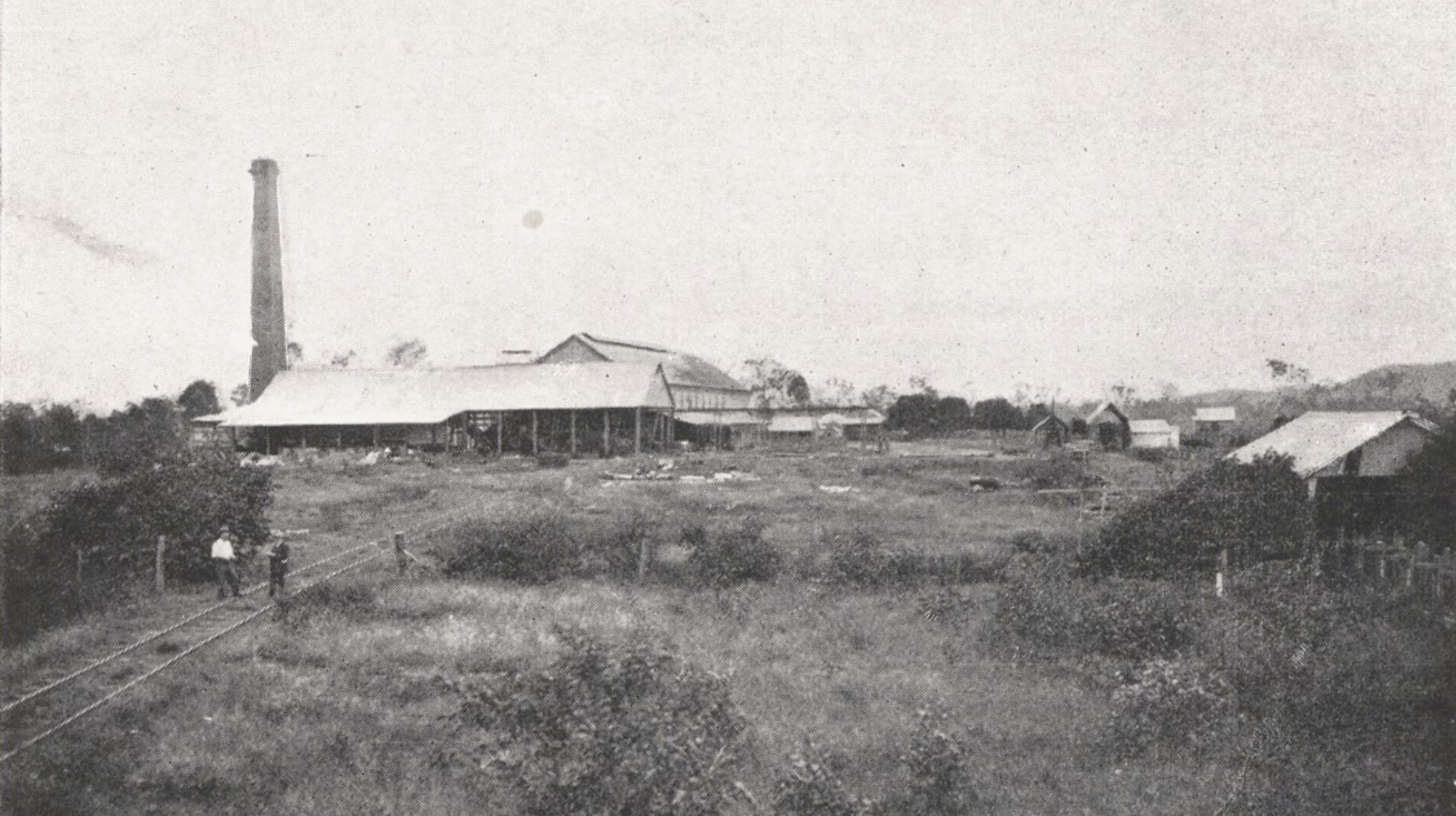
North Eton Sugar Mill, circa 1912

The neighbourhood of Victoria is located within North Eton (21.2333°S 148.9666°E).

The land is very flat, 30 metres above sea level, with a small rise on the western edge of the locality at the foothills of Mount Kinchant (in the neighbouring locality of Kinchant Dam). The north branch of Sandy Creek flows from the north-west to the south-east of the locality and is part of the Plane Creek drainage basin. The land is entirely used for farming, predominantly sugarcane.

== History ==
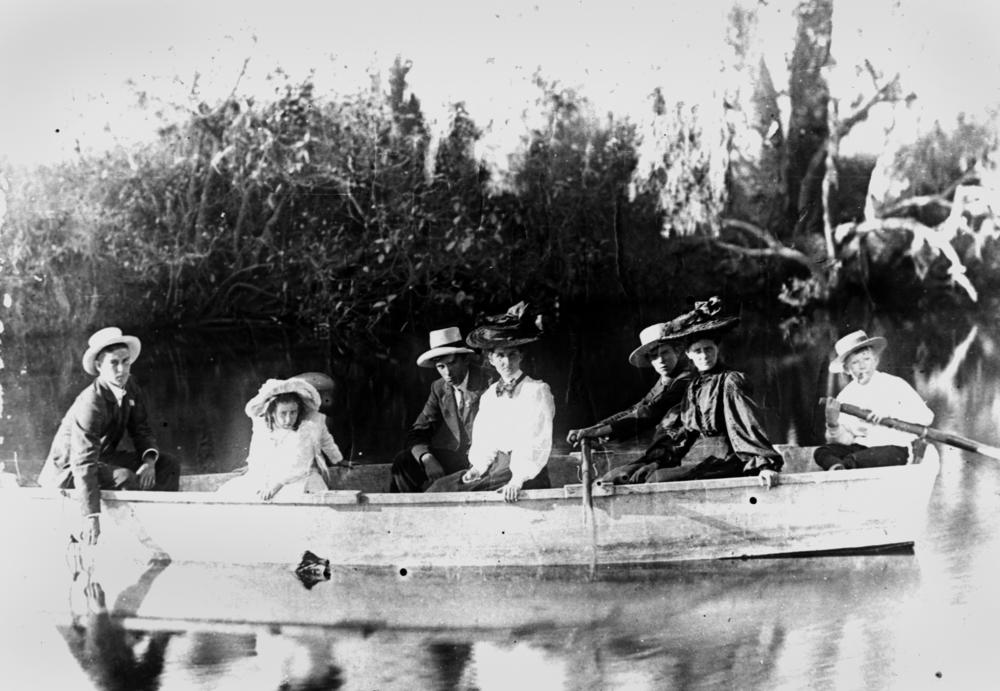
People rowing across Lagoon Creek at Beldan's, North Eton, circa 1900-1910

The area has been known as both North Eton and Eton North.

Originally known as the Defiance, the North Eton Central Mill commenced crushing sugarcane in 1888. It was the first sugar mill sponsored by the Queensland Government. In 1989, a number of sugar mills in the district merged to Mackay Sugar Limited, resulting in the closure of the North Eton mill.

The North Eton State School opened on 5 August 1895, but has also been known as the Eton North State School.

== Demographics ==
In the 2011 census, North Eton had a population of 536 people.

In the 2016 census, North Eton had a population of 186 people.

In the 2021 census, North Eton had a population of 189 people.

== Education ==
North Eton State School is a government primary (Prep-6) school for boys and girls at Kinchant Dam Road (21.2301°S 148.9562°E). In 2015, it had an enrolment of 14 students with 2 teachers (1 equivalent full-time) and 5 non-teaching staff (2 equivalent full-time). In 2018, the school had an enrolment of 13 students with 1 teacher and 5 non-teaching staff (2 full-time equivalent).

There are no secondary schools in North Eton. The nearest government secondary school is Mirani State High School in Mirani to the north-west.

== Community groups ==
The Eton / Eton North branch of the Queensland Country Women's Association meets at the QCWA Hall at 7 Mill Street, North Eton.

== See also ==
- List of tramways in Queensland
