= Peak Downs Highway =

Highway in Queensland, Australia

Peak Downs Highway Queensland
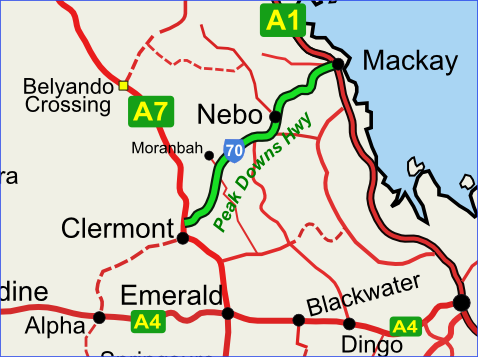
- Peak Downs Highway depicted in green on black.

General information
- Type: Highway
- Length: 283 km (176 mi)
- Route number(s): State Route 70

Major junctions
- East end: Bruce Highway, Mackay, Queensland
- Mackay Ring Road; Mackay–Eungella Road (State Route 64); Marian–Eton Road / Eton–Homebush Road (State Route 5); Suttor Developmental Road (State Route 11); Fitzroy Developmental Road (State Route 67); Gregory Highway (State Route A7)
- West end: Clermont–Alpha Road (State Route 41), Clermont, Queensland

Location(s)
- Major settlements: Moranbah, Nebo, Eton

Highway system
- Highways in Australia; National Highway • Freeways in Australia; Highways in Queensland

The Peak Downs Highway links the towns of Mackay and Clermont in the Australian state of Queensland. It represents the main link between Queensland's Whitsunday Coast and the Central West region of the state. The highway runs for a total length of 266 kilometres (165 mi), before joining the Gregory Highway (Highway A7, formerly Highway 55) south to Clermont, a total of 283 kilometres (176 mi). Major settlements served by this route include Walkerston, Nebo, Moranbah (10 kilometres (6.2 mi) north of the highway, but the largest town along the route) and Clermont.

The ABC has described the road as "crucial to the national economy" but, reporting 550 crashes in 10 years, said that it had been likened to roads in the Third World. "Someone is killed or seriously injured on the Peak Downs Highway on average about once every two-and-a-half weeks," it said. In December 2019 Mackay's Daily Mercury reported that 49 people had been killed and more than 1000 injured on the highway.

== Highway conditions ==
The highway is notorious for the extremely dangerous conditions caused by its service as a primary access route for workers, fuel, machinery and other supplies to the coal mines of the Bowen Basin. The narrow two-lane highway is often congested with oversize loads (e.g. mining haul-trucks, dozers and excavators, tyres and buckets) and road trains, which presents a significant hazard and frustration to fatigued long-haul commuters (Drive-in, Drive-out mine workers) on the road.

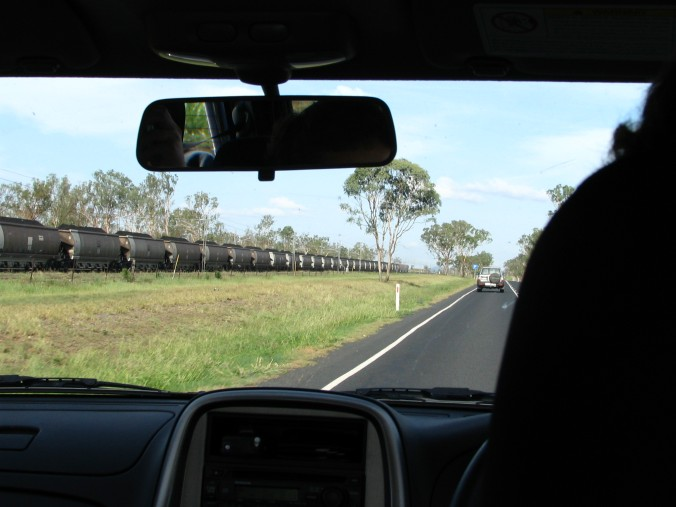
A coal train runs alongside the Peak Downs Highway.

== Northern Australia Roads Program upgrade ==
The Northern Australia Roads Program announced in 2016 included the following project for the Peak Downs Highway.

=== Pavement widening and strengthening ===
Completion of a project for pavement widening and strengthening between Clermont and Nebo had in June 2021 been expected in late 2022 at a total cost of $35 million. As of March 2023, roadworks of various kinds, some resurfacing, some more in depth, are ongoing in places, while others are relatively untouched, and the risk of death or serious injury to the highway’s users remains.

== Other upgrades ==
=== Eton Range realignment ===
A project to realign and upgrade the road on the Eton Range, at a cost of $189.26 million, was completed in October 2020.

=== Rehabilitate and widen ===
A project to rehabilitate and widen 3 kilometres (1.9 mi) of highway near Wolfgang Road, at a cost of $11.5 million, was completed in March 2022.

=== Road safety improvements ===
A project to improve road safety between Eton and Mackay, at a cost of $18 million, was due to finish in late 2021.

=== Walkerston bypass ===
A project to construct a bypass of Walkerston, at a cost of $186.6 million, was expected to be complete by mid to late 2024.

== Major intersections ==
| LGA | Location | km | mi | Destinations | Notes |
|---|---|---|---|---|---|
| Mackay | West Mackay, Paget, Ooralea tripoint | 0 | 0.0 | Bruce Highway (Queensland Highway A1) – south – Sarina / north–east – Mackay | North–eastern end of Peak Downs Highway (State Route 70) |
| Mackay | Racecourse, Te Kowai midpoint | 2.7 | 1.7 | Mackay Ring Road – north – Glenella south – Bakers Creek | No entry from Mackay Ring Road northbound. |
| Mackay | Alexandra | 6.4 | 4.0 | Mackay–Eungella Road (State Route 64) – north–west – Marian | |
| Mackay | Eton | 25.1 | 15.6 | Marian–Eton Road (State Route 5) – north–west – Marian | Eastern concurrency terminus with State Route 5 |
| Mackay | Eton | 25.8 | 16.0 | Eton–Homebush Road (State Route 5) – south–east – Homebush | Western concurrency terminus with State Route 5 |
| Isaac | Nebo | 82 | 51 | Suttor Developmental Road (State Route 11) – west – Mount Coolon | |
| Isaac | Strathfield, Oxford midpoint | 117 | 73 | Fitzroy Developmental Road (State Route 67) – south – Dingo | |
| Isaac | Clermont | 266 | 165 | Gregory Highway (State Route A7) – south – Clermont town centre / north – Charters Towers | Northern concurrency terminus with Gregory Highway |
| Isaac | Clermont | 280 | 170 | Gregory Highway (State Route A7) – south–east – Emerald | Southern concurrency terminus with Gregory Highway. Northern concurrency terminus with Clermont Connection Road. |
| Isaac | Clermont | 283 | 176 | Clermont–Alpha Road (State Route 41) – west – Alpha | Southern end of Clermont Connection Road and southwestern end of Peak Downs Highway. |
1.000 mi = 1.609 km; 1.000 km = 0.621 mi: Concurrency terminus; Incomplete access

== See also ==
- Highways in Australia
- List of highways in Queensland
