= Eton, Queensland =

Eton
- Town
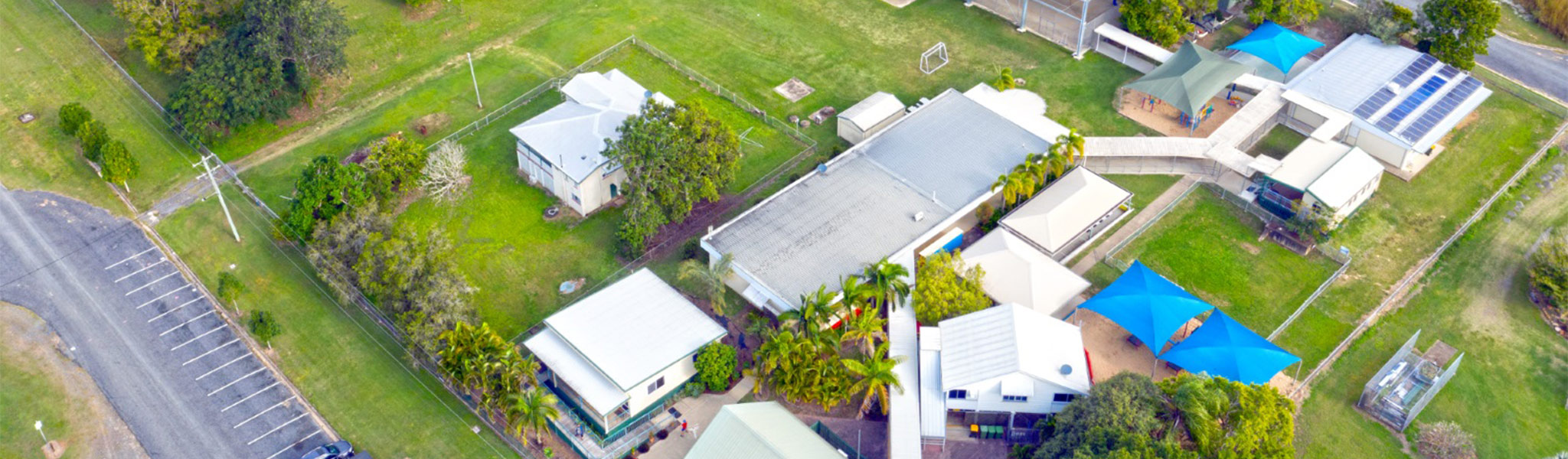
- Eton State School, 2025

- Interactive map of Eton
- Coordinates: 21.2638°S 148.9752°E
- Country: Australia
- State: Queensland
- LGA: Mackay Region
- Location: 29.8 km (18.5 mi) SW of Mackay; 339 km (211 mi) NNW of Rockhampton; 953 km (592 mi) NNW of Brisbane

Government
  - State electorate: Mirani
  - Federal division: Capricornia

Area
  - Total: 97.6 km^{2} (37.7 sq mi)

Population
  - Total: 728 (2021 census)
  - Density: 7.459/km^{2} (19.319/sq mi)
- Time zone: UTC+10:00 (AEST)
- Postcode: 4741
Localities around Eton
Brightly	North Eton	Victoria Plains
Pinevale	Eton	Homebush
Hazledean	Blue Mountain	Oakenden

Eton is a rural town and locality in the Mackay Region, Queensland, Australia. In the 2021 census, the locality of Eton had a population of 728 people.

== Geography ==
The northern part of the locality is flat land (about 30 metres above sea level), predominantly used as sugarcane plantations. The town is in this area. In the central part of the locality the land becomes hilly and is mostly used for grazing cattle. The southern part of the locality is mountainous (rising to 650 metres at Mount Bridgman) and is mostly undeveloped; some of this land is within the Ben Mohr State Forest and the Spencer Gap State Forest. In the very south of the locality (21.3545°S 148.9722°E) is the Hogan's Pocket Landfill, a waste disposal site developed in 2006 by Mackay Regional Council. The landfill gas generated from the site are captured and, although currently burned off, may be used for electricity generation in the future.

The Peak Downs Highway traverses the locality from south to north-east, passing through the town. State Route 5 (Marian–Eton Road and Eton–Homebush Road) passes through from north-west to south-east. A cane tramway passes through the northern part of the locality to deliver the harvested sugarcane to local sugar mills.

== History ==
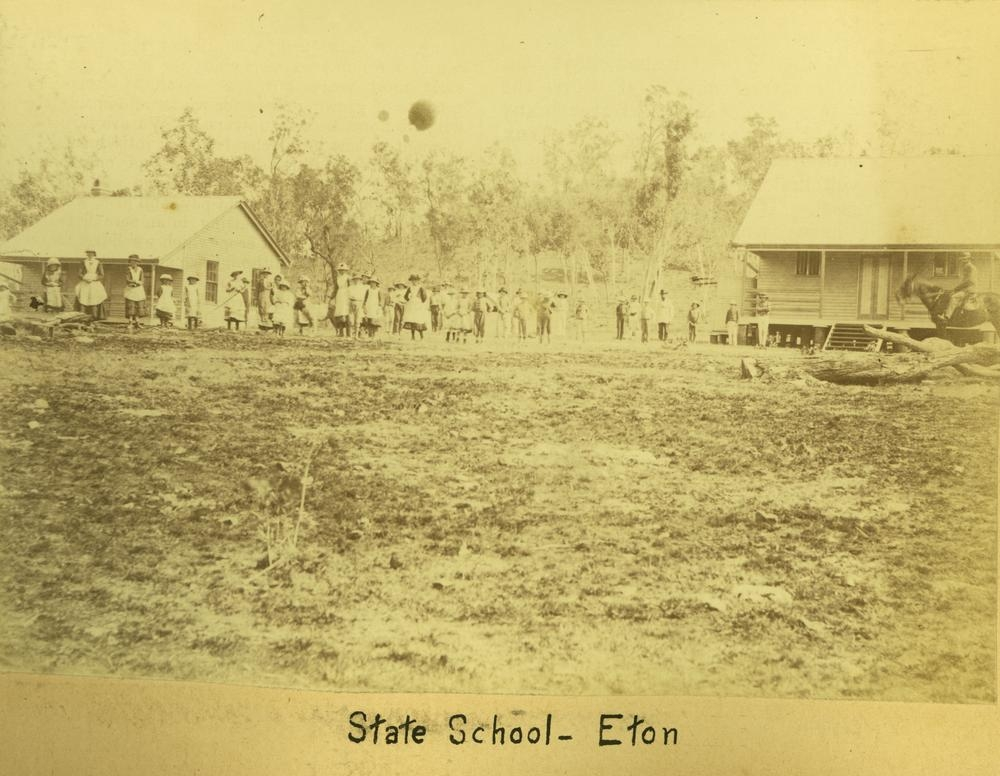
State School Eton near Mackay, circa 1884

Tenders were called for the construction of Eton State School in August 1882. The school opened on 20 August 1883. The school celebrated its centenary in 1983.

In September 1924, the Eton War Memorial was unveiled by Mrs T. Bagley and Mrs E. Beldan.

Brightley State School opened on 23 February 1925 and closed on 9 December 1988.

== Demographics ==
In the 2016 census, the locality of Eton had a population of 679 people.

In the 2021 census, the locality of Eton had a population of 728 people.

== Education ==
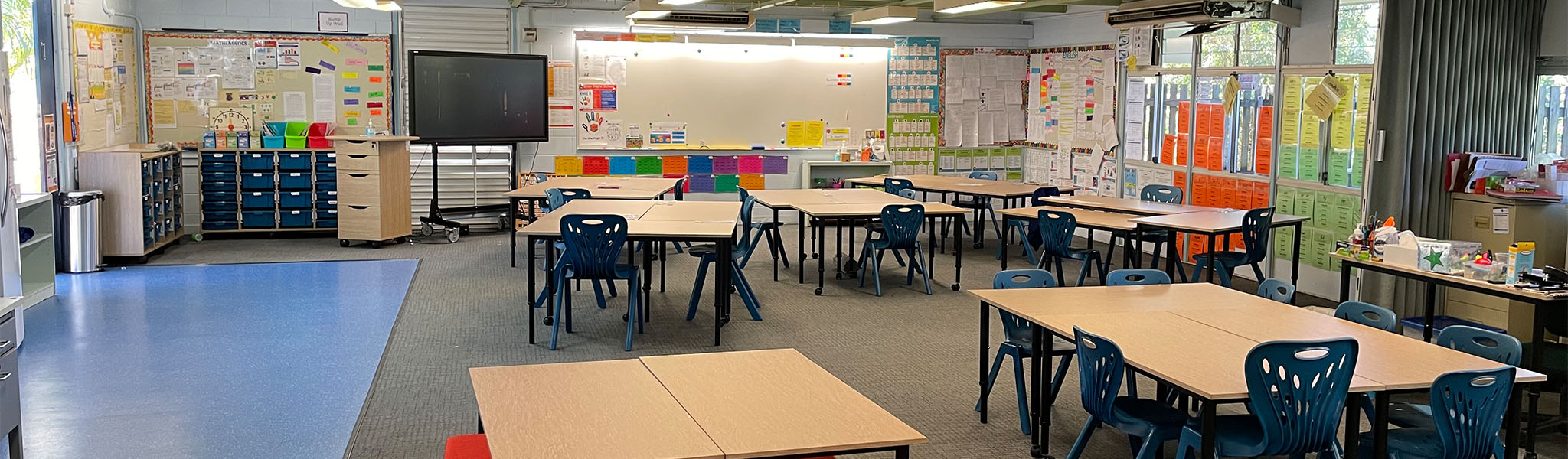
Classroom, Eton State School, 2025

Eton State School is a government primary (Prep-6) school for boys and girls at 10 Prospect Street (21.2642°S 148.9765°E). In 2016, the school had an enrolment of 50 with 3 teachers and 7 non-teaching staff (3 full-time equivalent). In 2018, the school had an enrolment of 30 students with 4 teachers (3 full-time equivalent) and 6 non-teaching staff (3 full-time equivalent).

There are no secondary schools in Eton. The nearest government secondary school is Mirani State High School in Mirani to the north-west.

== Community groups ==
The Eton / Eton North branch of the Queensland Country Women's Association meets at the QCWA Hall at 7 Mill Street, North Eton.
