= Marian, Queensland =

Marian
- Town
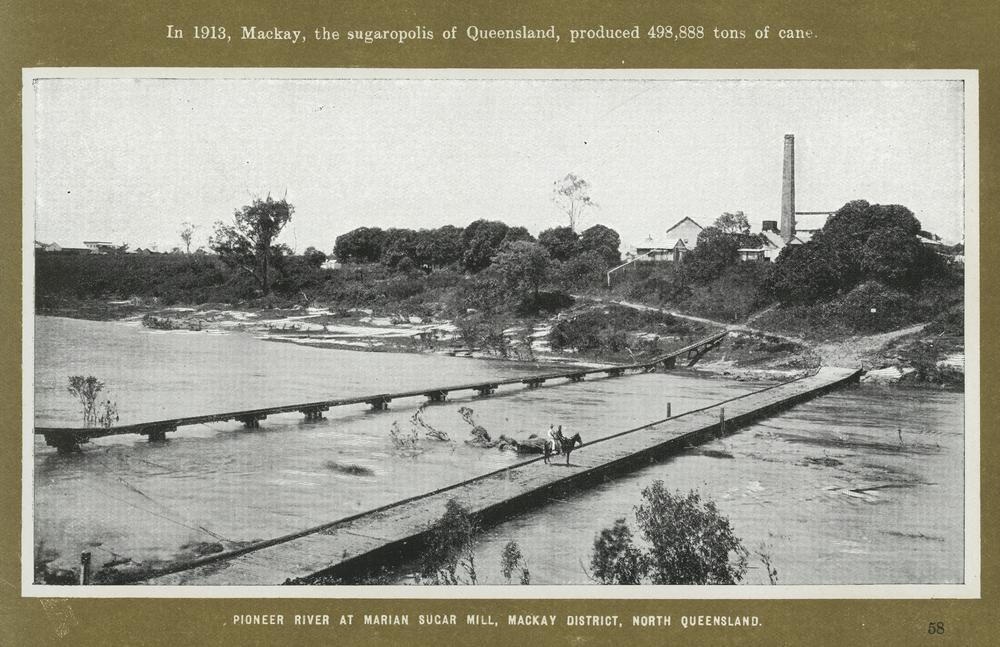
- Pioneer River at the Marian Sugar Mill in the Mackay district, circa 1915

- Interactive map of Marian
- Coordinates: 21.1452°S 148.9433°E
- Country: Australia
- State: Queensland
- LGA: Mackay Region
- Location: 9.1 km (5.7 mi) E of Mirani; 28.2 km (17.5 mi) W of Mackay CBD; 988 km (614 mi) NNW of Brisbane

Government
  - State electorate: Mirani
  - Federal division: Capricornia

Area
  - Total: 82.9 km^{2} (32.0 sq mi)

Population
  - Total: 4,224 (2021 census)
  - Density: 50.95/km^{2} (131.97/sq mi)
- Time zone: UTC+10:00 (AEST)
- Postcode: 4753
Localities around Marian
Devereux Creek	Hampden	Balnagowan
Mirani	Marian	Pleystowe; Greenmount
Kinchant Dam	North Eton	Victoria Plains

Marian is a rural town and locality in the Mackay Region, Queensland, Australia. In the 2021 census, the locality of Marian had a population of 4,224 people.

== Geography ==
The town is located on the south bank of the Pioneer River approximately 24 kilometres (15 mi) west of Mackay. The river forms part of the northern boundary. In the east is Mount Vince which remains vegetated. Surrounding the town is farmland, mostly growing sugar cane, which is serviced by a network of rail lines. These lines lead to the Marian Mill which was constructed in 1885.

== History ==
The town name Marian comes from the name of the (now closed) Marian railway station, which in turn reportedly derived its name from a local property called Mary Ann.

The first Catholic church was officially opened in 1901 by Bishop Joseph Higgins. It was a "small plain wooden structure". Father Pierre-Marie Bucas was the priest of the Mackay district at that time.

Marian Presbyterian Church opened in 1902.

Marian Mill Post Office opened by 1 January 1909 (a receiving office had been open from 1886) and was renamed Marian in 1910.

In December 1882, Helen Porter Mitchell (later Dame Nellie Melba) married Charles Armstrong, the manager of the Marian Sugar Mill. A house was built for them beside the mill. It was not a happy marriage as they separated in December 1883. Their home was later relocated to a riverbank location on Eungella Road in Edward Lloyd Park two kilometres from the centre of Marian and named Melba House. It serves as a museum to Nellie Melba and as the Pioneer Valley Visitor Information Centre.

The Marian Mill Provisional School opened on 15 November 1886. In 1899 it became the Marian State School.

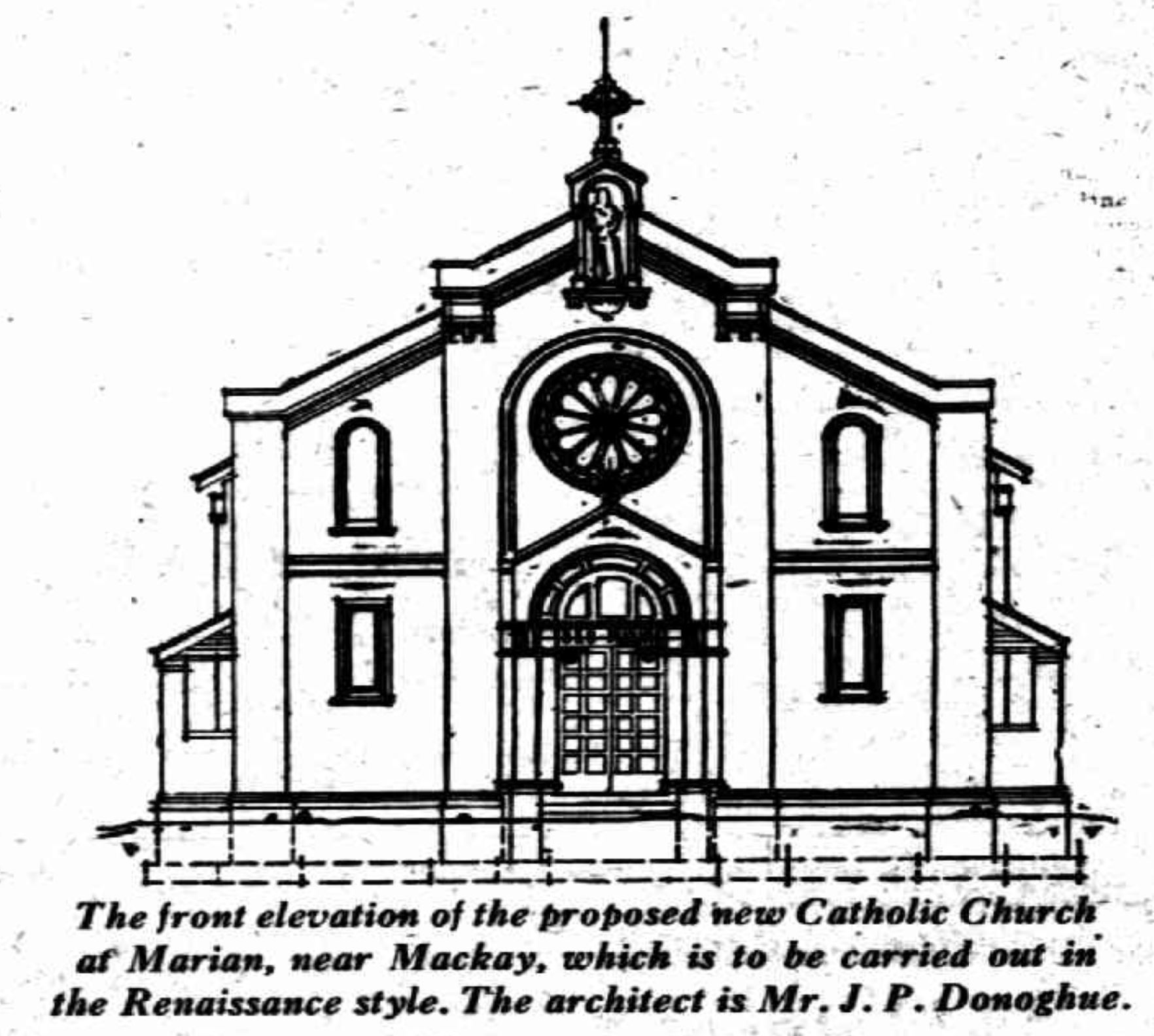
Front elevation of the Holy Rosary Catholic Church, 1926

The Sisters of Mercy established a convent in 1921 with a view to establishing a school. The Immaculate Heart of Mary Catholic School was officially opened on Sunday 6 April 1924 by Bishop Joseph Shiel. It closed on 31 December 1987.

On Whitsunday 5 June 1927, Bishop Shiel officially opened and blessed the new Holy Rosary Catholic Church. It was an imposing Romanesque structure. The old church was relocated to lower level on the site, between the new church and the convent.

== Demographics ==
In the 2011 census, the locality of Marian had a population of 3,019 people.

In the 2016 census, the locality of Marian had a population of 3,903 people.

In the 2021 census, the locality of Marian had a population of 4,224 people.

== Economy ==
Mackay Sugar operates the Marian sugar mill where over 2 million tonnes of sugar is crushed every year, making it one of the largest sugar mills in Australia.

Marian was one of the many towns across Central Queensland that were affected by the mining boom in Central Queensland. During this time the Nabilla Riverlink Estate was developed in Marian, and now holds a large portion of Marian’s population.

== Education ==
Marian State School is a government primary (Prep–6) school for boys and girls at 137 Anzac Avenue (21.1454°S 148.9585°E). In 2018, the school had an enrolment of 564 students with 42 teachers (38 full-time equivalent) and 34 non-teaching staff (18 full-time equivalent).

Pioneer Valley Cluster Special Education Program is a primary and secondary (Prep–12) special education program operated from the Marian State School.

There is no secondary school in Marian. The nearest government secondary school is Mirani State High School in neighbouring Mirani to the west.

== Amenities ==
The Mackay Regional Council operates a mobile library service on a fortnightly schedule at the Mackay–Eungella Road near the school.

Marian Town Centre is a shopping centre located in Marian. Opened in 2013, the centre has a full line Woolworths, The Reject Shop, Subway and a Porters Mitre 10.

Holy Rosary Catholic Church is at 284 Anzac Avenue (21.1457°S 148.9498°E).

There are a number of parks in the area:

- Anzac Park (21.1450°S 148.9440°E)
- Lloyd Park (21.1400°S 148.9618°E)

Mackay Regional Council manages parks, multiple walking and bike paths and a cemetery in the Marian area.

== See also ==
- List of tramways in Queensland
