= Mirani, Queensland =

Mirani
- Town
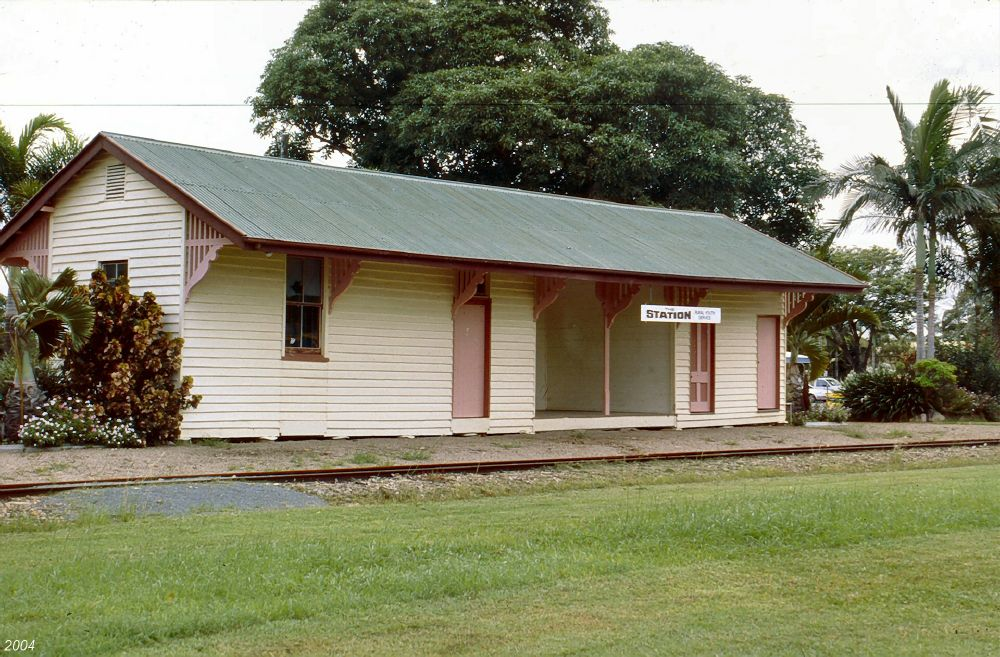
- Mirani railway station, 2004

- Interactive map of Mirani
- Coordinates: 21.16°S 148.8686°E
- Country: Australia
- State: Queensland
- LGA: Mackay Region
- Location: 37.1 km (23.1 mi) W of Mackay CBD; 369 km (229 mi) NW of Townsville; 978 km (608 mi) NNW of Brisbane

Government
  - State electorate: Mirani
  - Federal division: Capricornia

Area
  - Total: 51.9 km^{2} (20.0 sq mi)
- Elevation: 120 m (390 ft)

Population
  - Total: 1,806 (2021 census)
  - Density: 34.80/km^{2} (90.13/sq mi)
- Time zone: UTC+10:00 (AEST)
- Postcode: 4754
Localities around Mirani
Mount Martin	Devereux Creek	Devereux Creek
Benholme	Mirani	Marian
Septimus	Mia Mia	Kinchant Dam

Mirani (/mɪˈrɑːni/) is a rural town and locality in the Mackay Region, Queensland, Australia. In the 2021 census, the locality of Mirani had a population of 1,806 people.

== Geography ==
The locality of Mirani is predominantly flat land used for sugar cane farming. It is bounded to the south by Lake Kinchant, the impoudment created by the Kinchant Dam. The Pioneer River passes through the locality from west to north and forms part of the northern boundary. The Mackay–Eungella Road passes from east to north-west through the locality. There are a network of private tramways through Mirani to transport the sugar cane to the Mackay Sugar mills.

The town of Mirani is situated centrally within the locality on the eastern bank of the Pioneer River with Mackay-Eungella Road passing through it.

== History ==
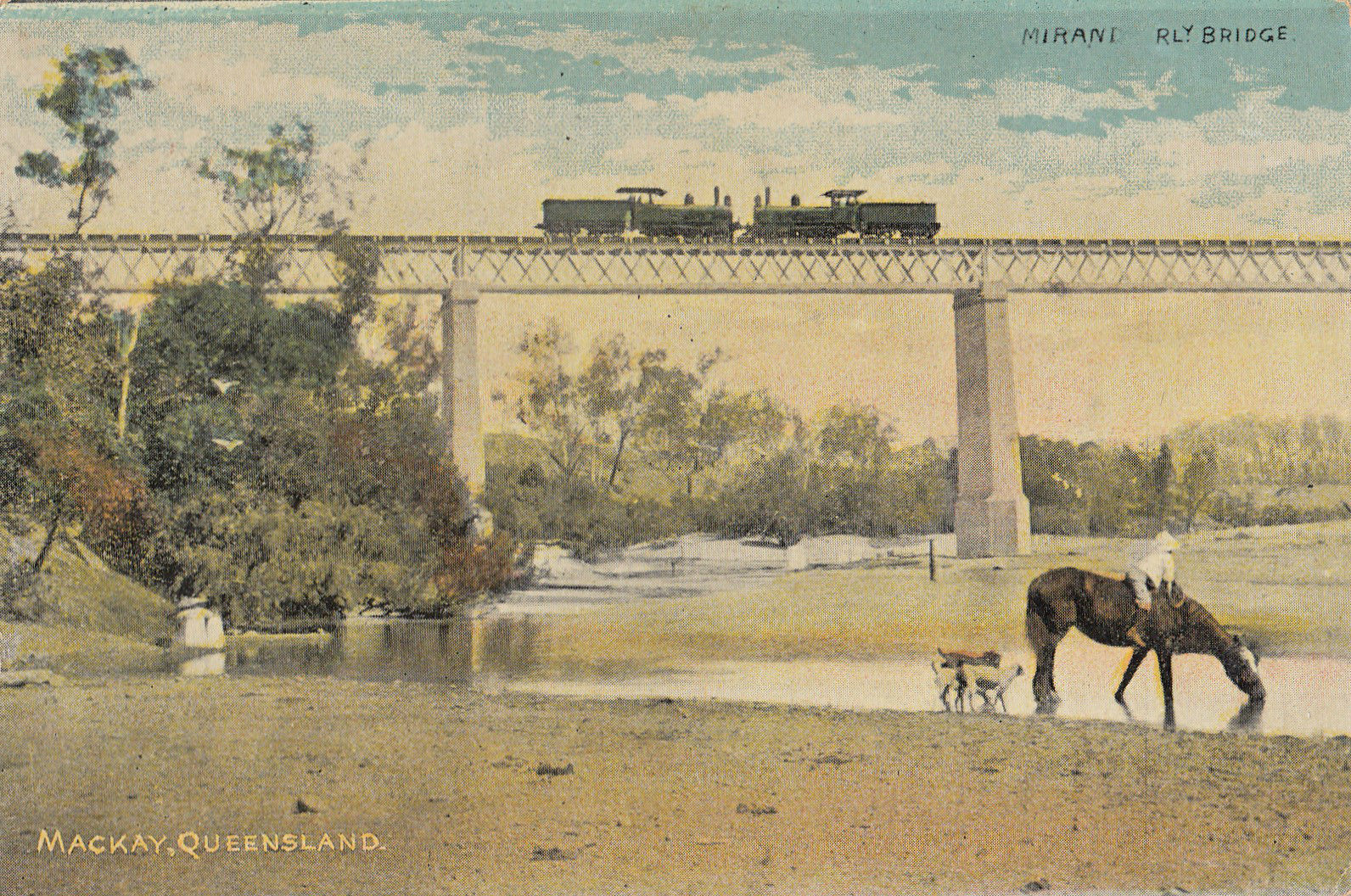
Mirani railway bridge over the Pioneer River, circa 1910

Yuwibara (also known as Yuibera, Yuri, Juipera, Yuwiburra) is an Australian Aboriginal language spoken on Yuwibara country. It is closely related to the Biri languages/dialects. The Yuwibara language region includes the landscape within the local government boundaries of the Mackay Region.

The Pioneer Valley railway line coming west from Mackay to Mirani (then known as Hamilton) was built in 1885. Later the name was changed to Mirani to avoid confusion with Hamilton in Brisbane. The line had the following stations servicing the locality (from west to east):

- Yeolands railway station (21.1555°S 148.8298°E)
- Mirani West railway station (21.1577°S 148.8519°E)
- Mirani railway station (21.1591°S 148.8643°E)
- Nanyima railway station (21.1607°S 148.8781°E)
- Otterburn railway station (21.1580°S 148.8987°E)

Between 1886 and 1896 land was made available for selection to be agricultural farms on the resumed portions of the Hamilton and Hopetown pastoral runs.

The receiving office called Hamilton had provided limited postal services to the community, and in 1885 the name Hamilton was changed to Hopeton. Mirani Post Office replaced the Receiving office in April 1890.

Mirani Provisional School opened on 18 January 1892, becoming Mirani State School on 11 March 1897. In 1961, the school added a secondary department, which operated until a separate secondary school was opened in 1967. The school was located at Augusta Street on the site of the current secondary school. On 22 June 1968, the school relocated to its present site in Maud Street with new buildings.

On Sunday 10 December 1899, Bishop Joseph Higgins, accompanied by 500 other people, travelled by special train to Mirani, where Higgins laid the foundation stone for a new Catholic church in Mirani. The new convent was opened on Sunday 6 April 1924. A new church opened on Sunday 5 June 1927.

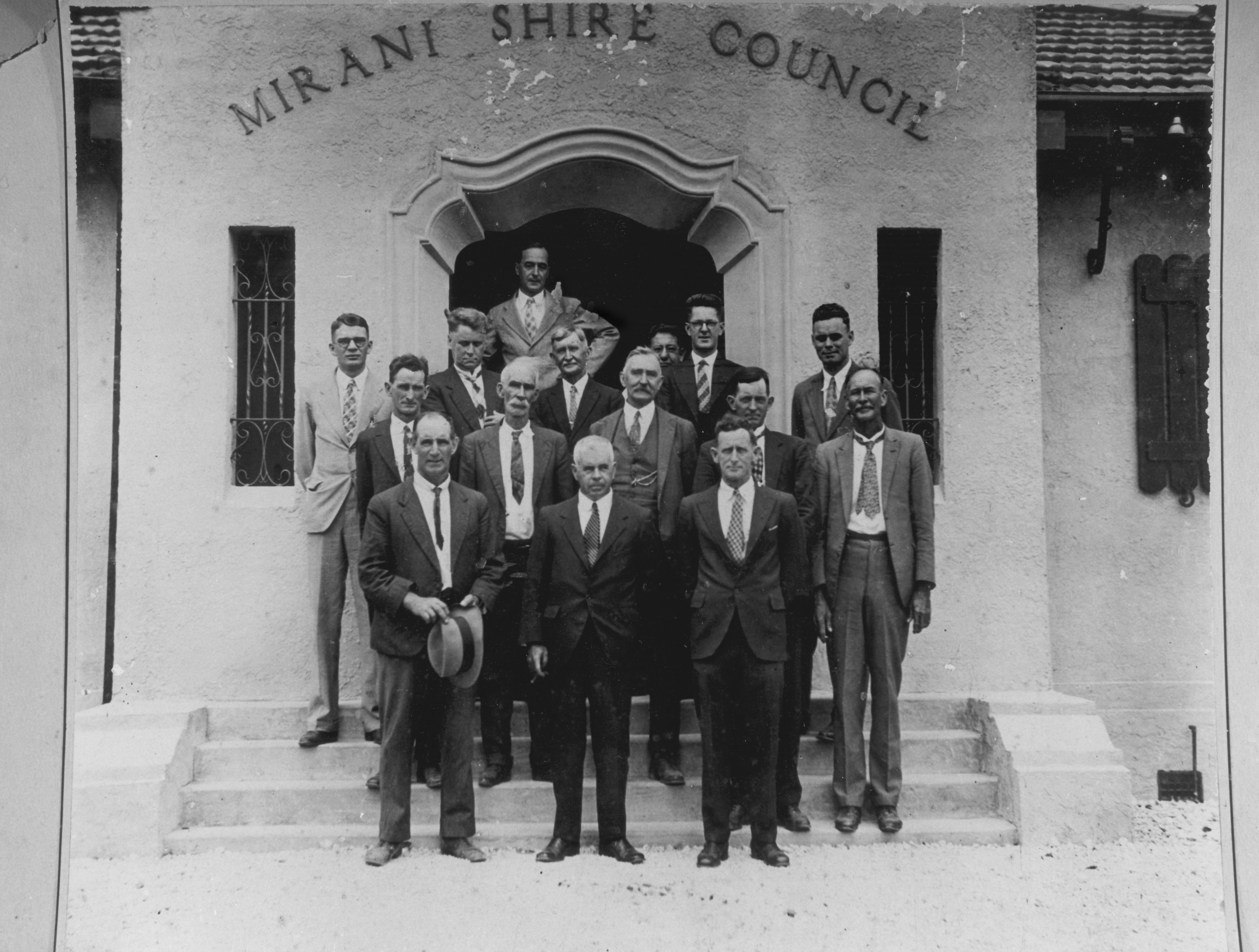
Mirani Shire Council, Queensland, Australia. October 1935

On Sunday 15 March 1908, Reverend T. Hely-Wilson laid the foundation stone for an Anglican church. The church opened on Sunday 20 September 1908, when it was dedicated to the Good Shepherd. In August 1951, Bishop Wilfred Belcher opened a new Good Shepherd Anglican Church.

On Sunday 12 July 1908, a Presbyterian church opened in Mirani. The church was re-opened on 4 August 1918.

On 4 September 1913, the Shire of Mirani was established, split from the Shire of Pioneer under the Local Authorities Act 1902. Mirani was the administrative centre of the shire.

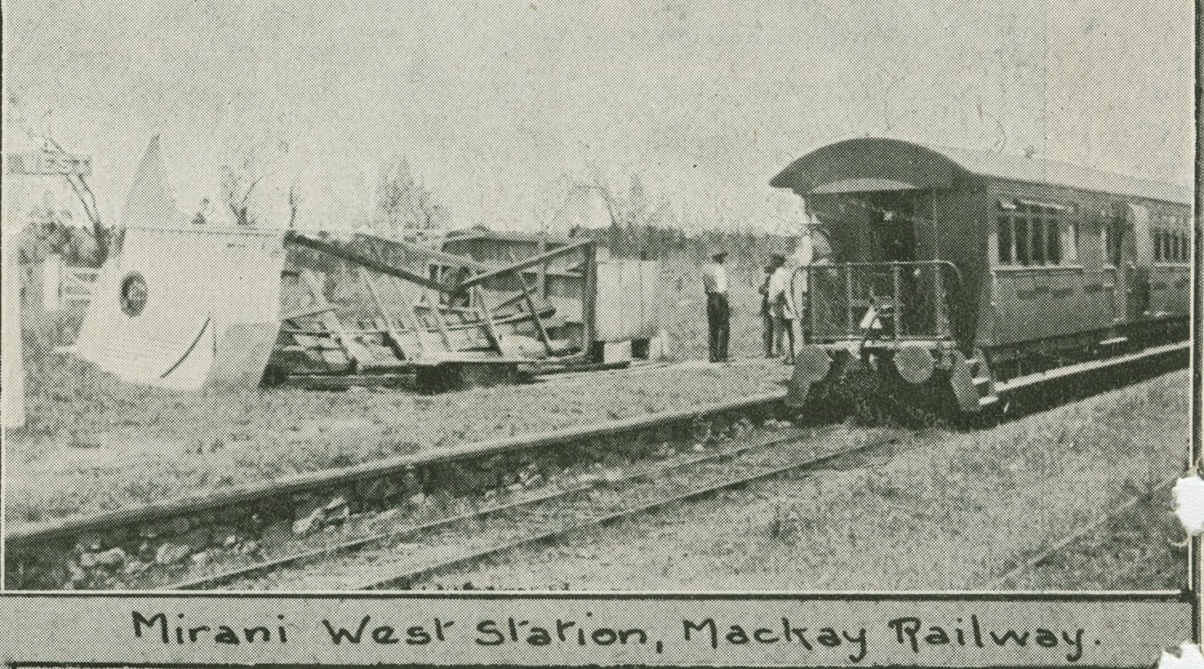
Mirani West Railway Station after the 1918 Mackay cyclone which struck 20–21 January 1918

The 1918 Mackay cyclone struck the city of Mackay, Queensland, Australia on 20–21 January 1918. It remains one of the most destructive cyclones to strike a populated centre in Australia.

Mirani State High School opened on 23 January 1967.

At the 2006 census, the town of Mirani had a population of 813.

On 15 March 2008, under the Local Government (Reform Implementation) Act 2007 passed by the Parliament of Queensland on 10 August 2007, the Shire of Mirani merged with the City of Mackay and Shire of Sarina to form the Mackay Region.

== Demographics ==
In the 2016 census, the locality of Mirani had a population of 1,541 people.

In the 2021 census, the locality of Mirani had a population of 1,806 people.

== Heritage listings ==
Mirani has a number of heritage-listed sites, including:

- Lt Thomas Armstrong Memorial, Victoria Street (21.1601°S 148.8641°E)
- Mirani railway station, Victoria Street

== Education ==
Mirani State School is a government primary (Prep–6) school for boys and girls at 12 Maud Street (21.1614°S 148.8619°E). In 2018, the school had an enrolment of 343 students with 20 teachers (19 full-time equivalent) and 19 non-teaching staff (10 full-time equivalent).

Mirani State High School is a government secondary (7–12) school for boys and girls at Augusta Street (21.1576°S 148.8623°E). In 2018, the school had an enrolment of 842 students with 70 teachers (68 full-time equivalent) and 35 non-teaching staff (26 full-time equivalent). It includes a special education program.

== Amenities ==
The Mackay Regional Council operates a library at 16 Victoria Street.
