= Habana, Queensland =

Habana
- Suburb
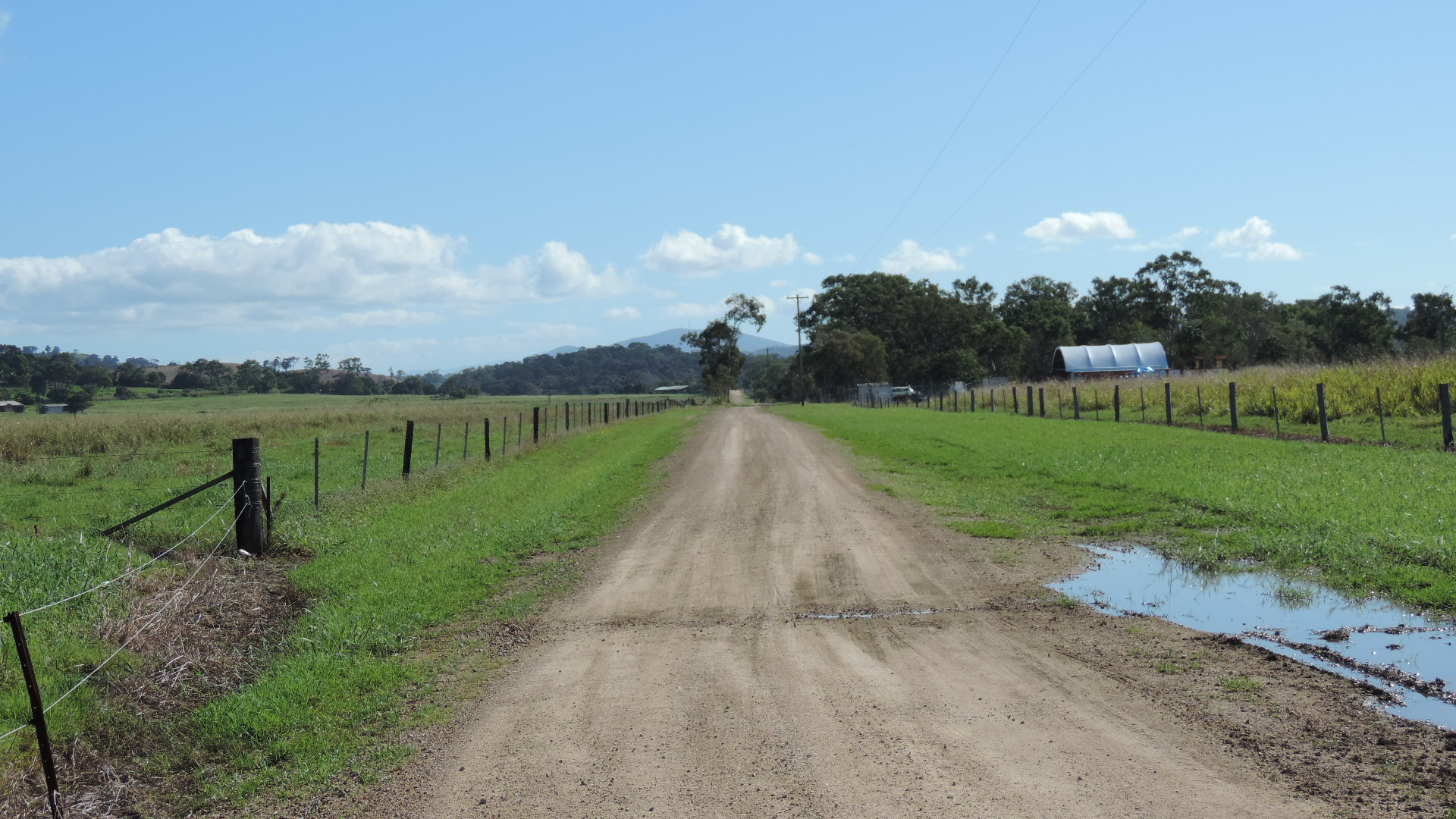
- Looking west on Orphanage Road, on the boundary of Nindaroo (south & left) and Habana (north & right), 2016

- Interactive map of Habana
- Coordinates: 21.0202°S 149.0744°E
- Country: Australia
- State: Queensland
- LGA: Mackay Region
- Location: 20 km (12 mi) NW of Mackay; 376 km (234 mi) SE of Townsville; 1,037 km (644 mi) NNW of Brisbane

Government
  - State electorate: Whitsunday
  - Federal division: Dawson

Area
  - Total: 91.3 km^{2} (35.3 sq mi)
- Elevation: 0–198 m (0–650 ft)

Population
  - Total: 1,022 (2021 census)
  - Density: 11.194/km^{2} (28.992/sq mi)
- Time zone: UTC+10:00 (AEST)
- Postcode: 4740
Suburbs around Habana
| Coral Sea | Coral Sea | Shoal Point |
| The Leap | Habana | Bucasia |
| The Leap | Farleigh | Nindaroo |

Habana is a coastal rural locality in the Mackay Region, Queensland, Australia. In the 2021 census, Habana had a population of 1,022 people.

== Geography ==
Habana is bounded to the north by Sand Bay (20.9500°S 149.0536°E) in the Coral Sea. The land near the sea is low-lying and sugarcane is grown in that area. Heading inland to the south the terrain becomes more mountainous and is predominantly used for grazing on native vegetation.

Habana has the following mountains:

- Barrow Hill (21.0028°S 149.0880°E) 24 metres (79 ft)
- Mount Gabrovo (21.0379°S 149.0474°E) 198 metres (650 ft)
- Mount Xeromero (21.0384°S 149.0316°E) 105 metres (344 ft)
- The Black Mountain (21.0688°S 149.0983°E) 305 metres (1,001 ft)

Habana has the following beaches:

- Neils Beach (20.9973°S 149.1067°E)
- Williamsons Beach (20.9839°S 149.0987°E)

There is a cane tramway network through the locality providing transport of the harvested sugarcane to Farleigh Sugar Mill in neighbouring Farleigh to the south.

== History ==
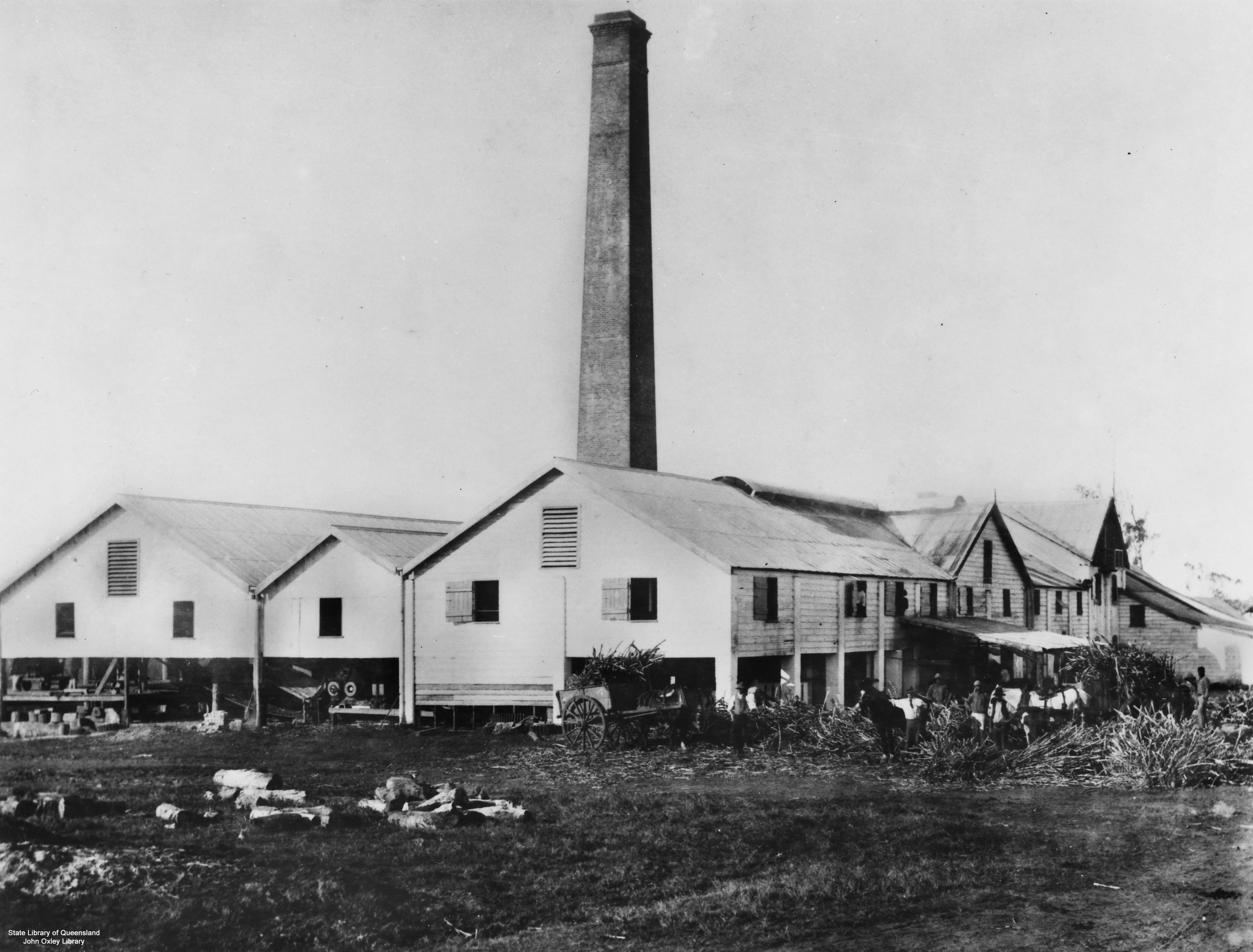
Habana Sugar Mill, 1895

The locality takes its name from La Habana sugar plantation established by Edward Maitland Long and William Robertson in 1881 on 6000 acres of land already owned by Long. They built the Habana sugar mill in 1883 and it operated until 1901.

Habana Provisional School opened on 24 September 1883 and closed in 1906. In 1917 Habana State School opened but was destroyed by a cyclone in January 1918. It was decided to rebuild the school at a new 5-acre (2.0 ha) site on the road to Bowen. It closed in 1960. The school was located at 863 Yakapari Road (21.03168°S 149.06852°E).

Etowri State School opened in 1926 and closed circa 1953. It was located at 108 Barcoo Road (21.04789°S 149.11483°E).

== Demographics ==
In the 2016 census, Habana had a population of 925 people.

In the 2016 census, Habana had a population of 952 people.

In the 2021 census, Habana had a population of 1,022 people.

== Heritage listings ==
Habana has a number of heritage-listed sites, including:

- Between Habana Wharf Road and Constant Creek: Habana Tramline Causeway and Wharf Site

== Education ==
There are no schools in Habana. The nearest government primary schools are Farleigh State School and Coningsby State School, both in neighbouring Farleigh to the south, and Beaconsfield State School in Beaconsfield to the south-east. The nearest government secondary schools are Mackay Northern Beaches State High School in Rural View to the east and Mackay North State High School in North Mackay to the south-east.

== Amenities ==
The Mackay Regional Council operates a mobile library service on a fortnightly schedule at the corner of Moohin and Habana Roads.

There are a number of parks in the area, including:

- Dolphins Park (21.0356°S 149.1471°E)
- Gardiners Road Park (21.0367°S 149.0623°E)
- Olletts Road Park (21.0262°S 149.0572°E)

== See also ==
- List of tramways in Queensland
