= Nindaroo =

- Suburb
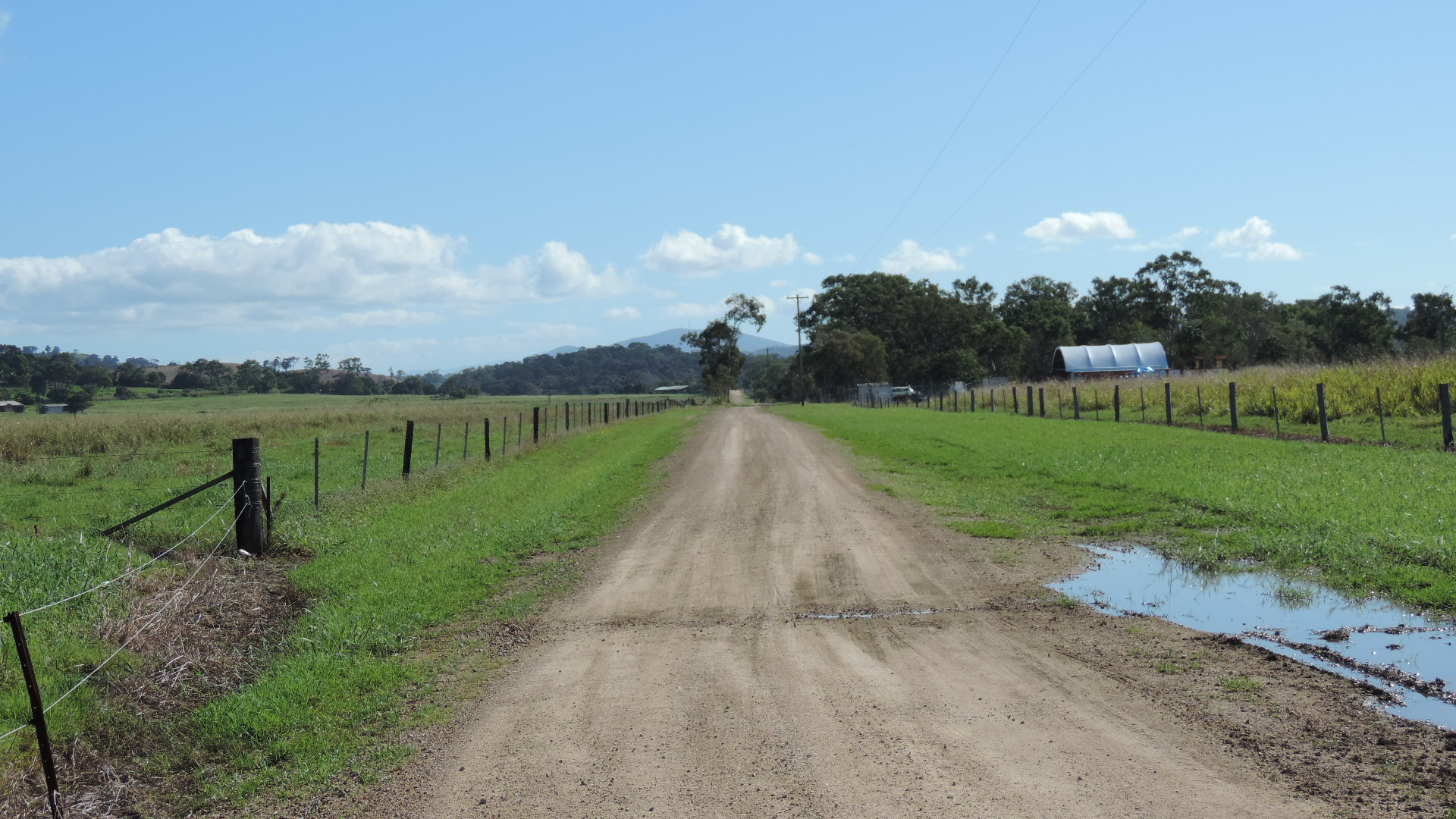
- Looking west on Orphanage Road, on the boundary of Nindaroo (south & left) and Habana (north & right), 2016

- Interactive map of Nindaroo
- Coordinates: 21.0708°S 149.1291°E
- Country: Australia
- State: Queensland
- LGA: Mackay Region
- Location: 12.9 km (8.0 mi) NNW of Mackay CBD; 988 km (614 mi) NNW of Brisbane

Government
  - State electorate: Whitsunday
  - Federal division: Dawson

Area
  - Total: 7.8 km^{2} (3.0 sq mi)

Population
  - Total: 255 (2021 census)
  - Density: 32.69/km^{2} (84.7/sq mi)
- Time zone: UTC+10:00 (AEST)
- Postcode: 4740
Suburbs around Nindaroo
Habana	Habana	Bucasia
Habana	Nindaroo	Rural View
Farleigh	Richmond	Richmond

Nindaroo is a rural locality in the Mackay Region, Queensland, Australia. In the 2021 census, Nindaroo had a population of 255 people.

== Geography ==
The Mackay-Habana Road enters the locality from the south-east (Richmond) and exits to the north-west (Habana).

The terrain ranges from 5 to 140 metres (16 to 459 ft) above sea level with the lower elevations in the north-east of the locatity and the highest elevations in the south. There is one named peak, The Dome (21.0659°S 149.1225°E) rising to 136 metres (446 ft) in the west of the locality.

The land use is predominantly grazing on native vegetation with a small area growing sugarcane in the south-east of the locality. There is also rural residential housing, mostly on the slopes in the east of the locality.

== History ==
Nindaroo Provisional School opened on 27 February 1899. On 1 January 1909, it became Nindaroo State School, before closing in 1963. The school was located at 1 Boveys Road, corner of Mackay Habana Road (21.08220°S 149.14186°E), now in neighbouring Richmond.

== Demographics ==
In the 2016 census, Nindaroo had a population of 239 people.

In the 2021 census, Nindaroo had a population of 255 people.

== Education ==
There are no schools in Nindaroo. The nearest government primary schools are:

- Beaconsfield State School in Beaconsfield to the south-east
- Northview State School in Mount Pleasant to the south-east
- Farleigh State School in neighbouring Farleigh to the south-west
- Eimeo Road State School in neighbouring Rural View to the east

The nearest government secondary schools are:

- Mackay Northern Beaches State High School in neighbouring Rural View to the east
- Mackay North State High School in North Mackay to the south-east
