= Mango Avenue, Eimeo =

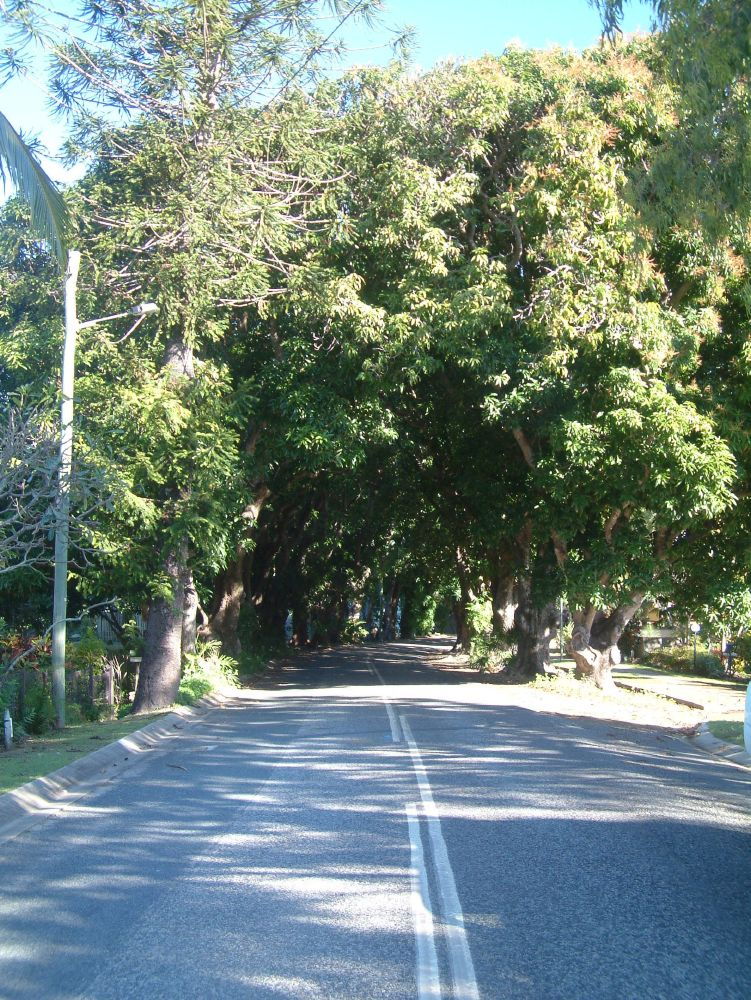
- Mango Avenue, Eimeo

- Location within Queensland Location within Australia
- 21.036°S 149.1756°E
- Location: Mango Avenue (between Whittles Lane and Heidke Street), Eimeo, Mackay Region, Queensland, Australia

Queensland Heritage Register
- Official name: Mango Avenue
- Type: state heritage (landscape)
- Designated: 31 July 2008
- Reference no.: 602553
- Significant period: c.1880s - present

Mango Avenue is a heritage-listed avenue of trees at Mango Avenue (between Whittles Lane and Heidke Street), Eimeo, Mackay Region, Queensland, Australia. It was added to the Queensland Heritage Register on 31 July 2008.

== History ==
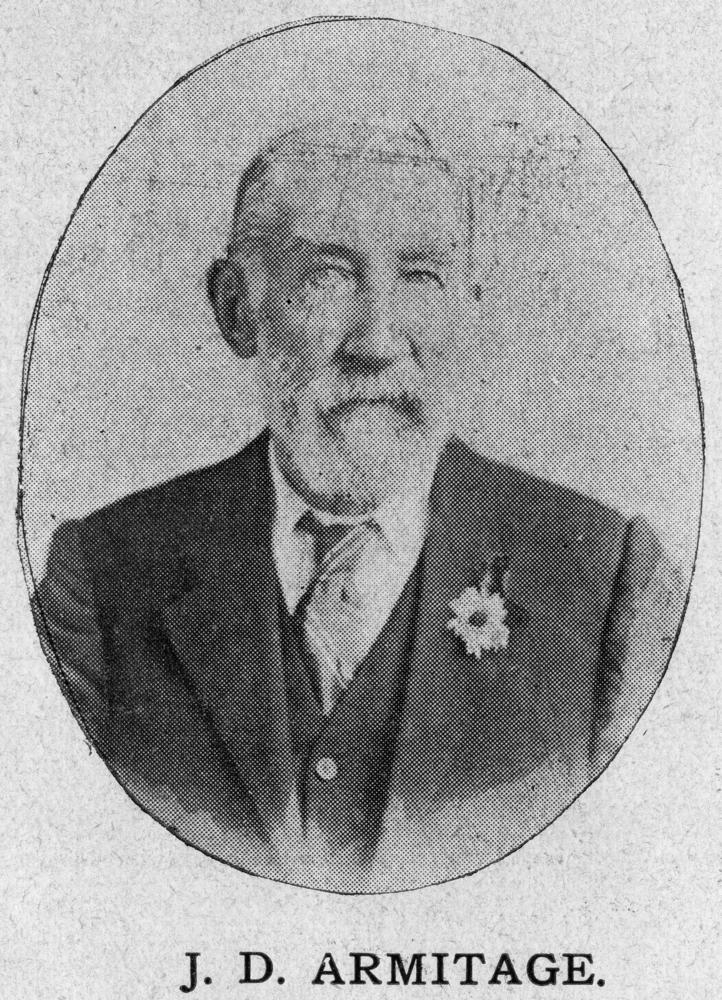
Jeremiah Downs Armitage

The avenue of mango trees at Eimeo, north of Mackay, was established probably in the 1880s by Jeremiah Downs Armitage, owner of the beachside Eimeo hotel/boarding house, to delineate the track leading from the main road through his property to the hotel.

The Pioneer River district was taken up for pastoral and agricultural purposes from 1860. In 1862 a settlement was established on the south bank of the river; in 1863 this was surveyed as the township of Mackay, the first sale of town lots was held, Mackay was gazetted as a port of entry, and a customs house was opened. The town prospered as a port and as a commercial and administrative centre, drawing business from nearby pastoral holdings and the sugar plantations being developed along the river from the late 1860s. In the 1880s the population expanded as the Queensland economy enjoyed a boom and government settlement programs attracted agricultural immigrants to the colony. The Pioneer River sugar industry was flourishing and Mackay was emerging as an important regional centre.

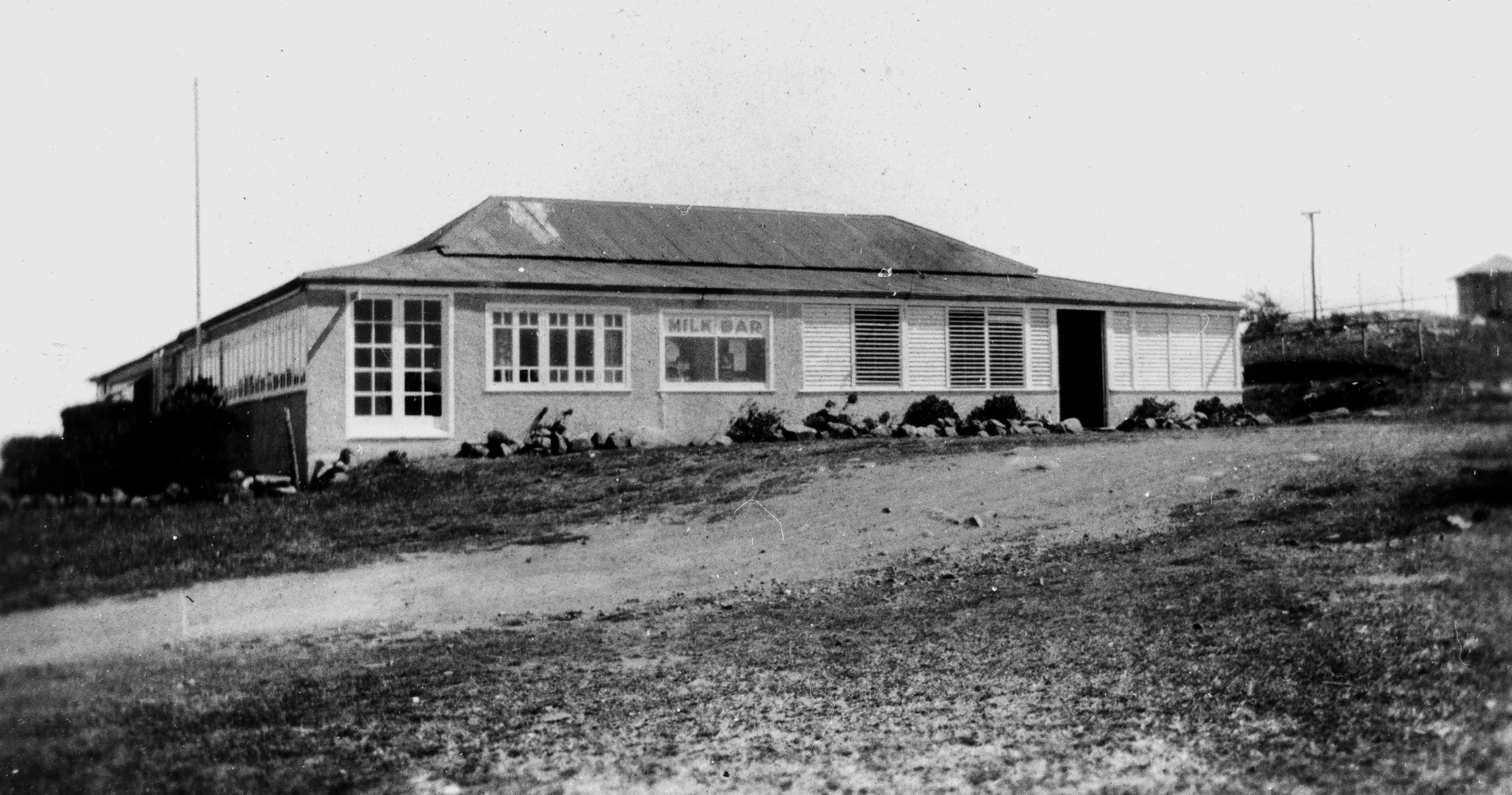
Eimeo Hotel, circa 1935

Jeremiah Armitage came to Mackay in the early 1870s, and took up a 105-acre (42 ha) selection with ocean frontages, about 9 miles (14 km) north of Mackay, which he named after his birthplace, the island of Eimeo (Moorea) near Tahiti in the Society Islands where his father Elijah Armitage had been a missionary. The land was selected in the name of Nancy Armitage (spinster), who gained a deed of grant to the property in 1876. Following her marriage in 1881, title was transferred early in 1882 to Jeremiah Downs Armitage. In 1874 he was recorded as a Mackay timber merchant, but had turned his attention to fruit growing by the 1880s.

To supplement his income as a fruit grower, Armitage developed Eimeo as one of the Mackay district's first tourist destinations. In April 1880 he opened a newly completed boarding house on a promontory overlooking the sea on three sides (later known as Eimeo Hill). The house sat in a 9 acres (3.6 ha) garden stocked with fruit trees, and visitors were invited to enjoy "sea bathing, yachting, fishing and shooting". He may have licensed this building for a short period, as he held a publican's license for the Eimeo Hotel, Eimeo, in 1889–1890.

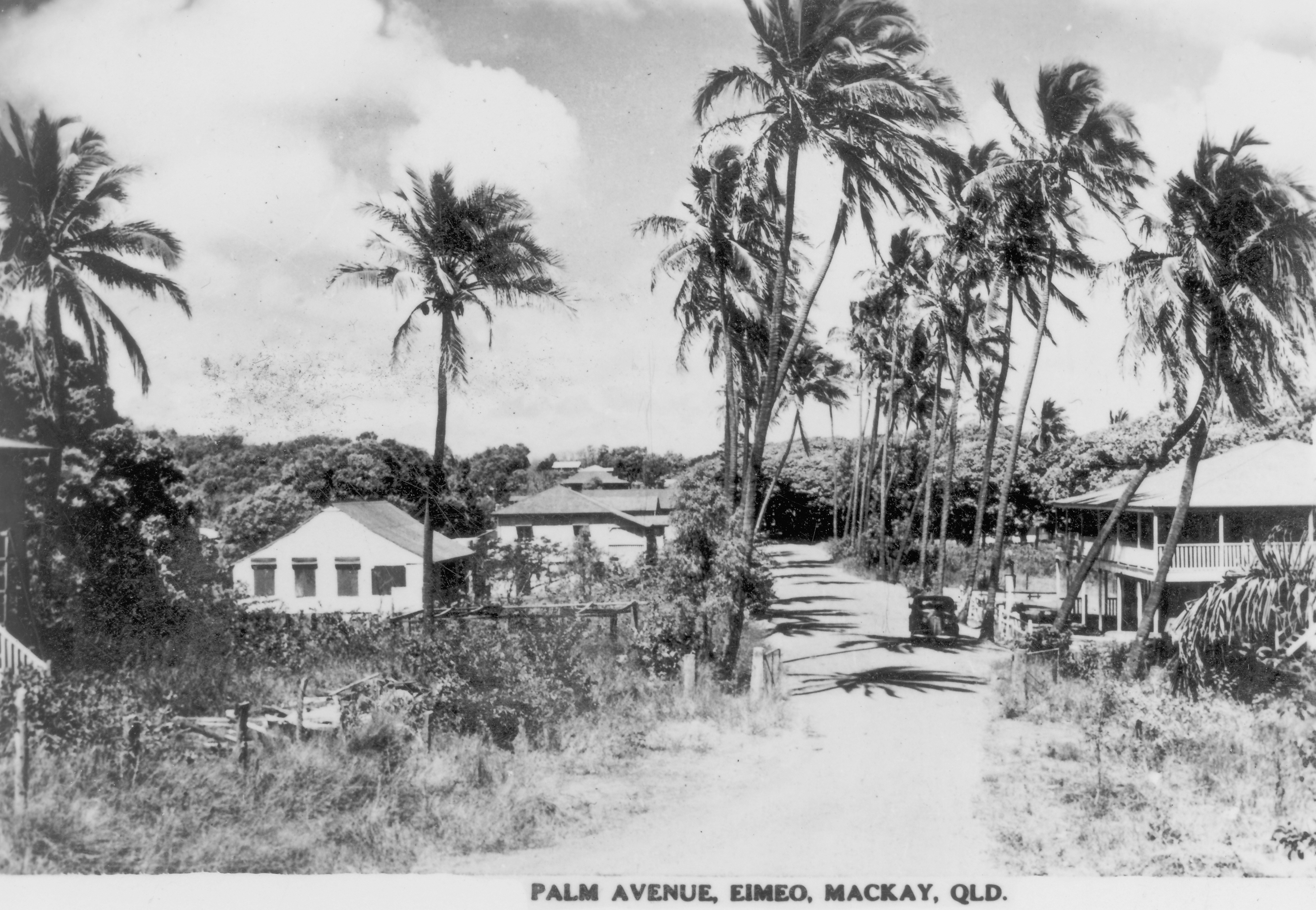
Avenue of coconut palms, 1950

Armitage is believed to have planted an avenue of coconut palms (Cocos nucifera) and another of mango trees (Mangifera indica) along the track through his property leading to the boarding house/hotel. The mango is a large tree indigenous to India and South East Asia. As well as producing an edible fruit, the mango is an excellent shade tree. Walter Hill, first superintendent of the Brisbane Botanic Gardens, is credited with its introduction to Queensland and it was cultivated widely in North Queensland by early settlers, as a specimen tree in botanic gardens, as a household fruit tree, and as a shade tree along streets and in public parks.

From January 1885 Jeremiah Armitage, fruit grower, conducted the first postal receiving office at Eimeo. By 1891 this duty had been transferred to Mrs Kemp of the Sea View Hotel.

Contemporaneously with Armitage's license for the Eimeo Hotel, William George Kemp held a license for the Seaview (or Sea View) Hotel at Eimeo from 1887 to 1894. This was transferred to Mrs ER Kemp in 1894, then to WJ Clemments (or Clements) in 1895 and to PA Christiansen in 1896. Seaview Beach (now Bucasia) was located just west/north-west of Eimeo Hill. Kemp Street at Bucasia commemorates Mr and Mrs Kemp, early licensees of the Seaview Hotel.

On 21 August 1890 Armitage advertised Eimeo for sale. The property then consisted of 105 acres (42 ha), the Beach Hotel, a large residence and numerous fruit trees. No license for the Beach Hotel has been identified. The hotel did not sell at this time.

In October 1890 J Armitage was appointed Superintendent of Coconut Planting by the Queensland government, to plant and manage coconut palms on coastal islands for the use of shipwrecked sailors. He appears to have held this position for a short period only, someone else being appointed to the position in July 1892.

Armitage was declared insolvent in 1893, at which time his Eimeo property passed to his mortgagor, the Queensland National Bank, which leased the whole of the land to Robert Bridgman from 1895. Bridgman conducted the boarding house at Eimeo. Armitage retained some connection with the area, being listed as an apiarist at Eimeo in the 1900 Queensland Post Office Directory. He died at Greenslopes in Brisbane on 21 May 1919.

In 1905, George Francis Bridgman obtained title to the property, which was transferred in 1913 to Mackay publican Martin Hassett, and in 1915 to another Mackay hotelkeeper, William Thomas Eyles. From at least Eyles' occupation, the business was known as the Eimeo Hotel.

In November 1919 title to the whole of the property was transferred to Charles Louis Albert Brown, who carried out the first subdivision of the 105 acres (42 ha) property in 1920, creating a number of beachfront residential allotments. In the mid-1920s the track leading to the Eimeo Hotel at the northern end of the property was surveyed as a public lane, which became known as Mango Avenue.

In 1923 the bulk of the property, including the Eimeo Hotel, was transferred to Arthur James Wallis Mowlam, then to James Amstead in 1926. Their names are perpetuated in nearby streets.

As the use of motor vehicles expanded in Queensland from the 1920s, Eimeo beach and the Eimeo Hotel, easily accessed from Mackay by road, gained in popularity with both local residents and tourists as recreation venues. The Queensland Government Intelligence and Tourist Bureau's 1929 publication The Mackay District, North Queensland (2nd edition pp29, 31) confirms this popularity and suggests that the Mango Avenue trees were well established by the late 1920s:

"In close proximity to Mackay are many splendid beaches. Some of them are beautifully situated, surrounded by coconut palms, and reached through avenues of mango trees. The two most popular seaside resorts are Eimeo and Slade Point. Both of these are within easy motoring distance. Eimeo is about 9 miles north-west of Mackay, and can easily be reached by motor-car in half an hour. The drive to Eimeo is interesting all the way. At Eimeo there is a comfortable hotel, where every attention is paid to visitors. The hotel is situated on a beautiful headland, and commands charming views on all sides. The grounds of the hotel are extensive and well laid out with many varieties of fruit trees, while the approach thereto is laid out with stately coconut palms. Excellent shooting and fishing may be enjoyed here, and a motor-boat is available for conveying parties around one or other of the beautiful bays in this vicinity."

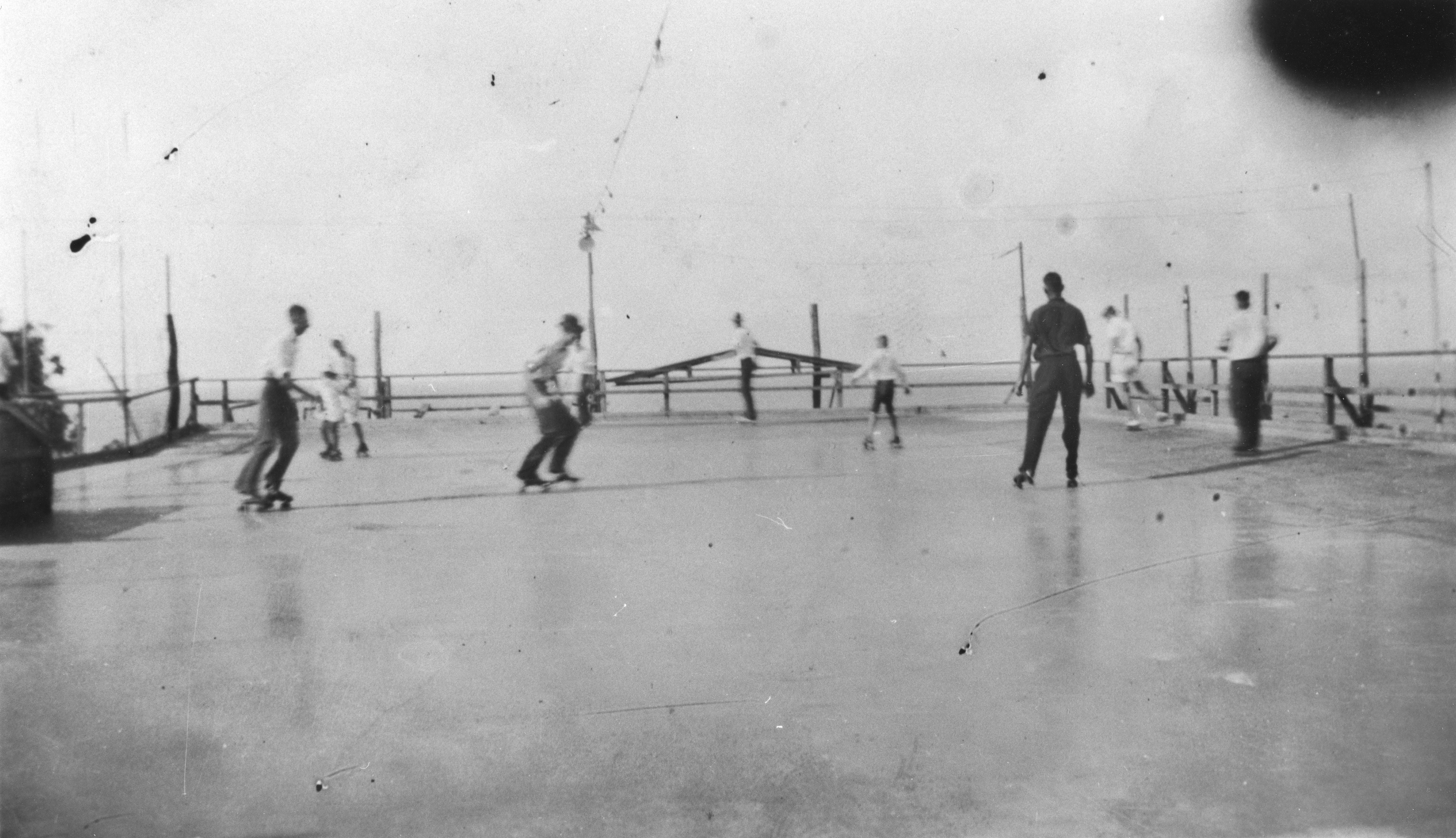
Skating rink, 1939

In late 1932 title to the hotel site, on a reduced parcel of just under 9 acres (3.6 ha), was transferred to Mrs Lavinia Walters, who demolished the building and constructed a new Eimeo Hotel in 1934, using some of the materials from the demolition. She purchased an old Anglican parish hall and moved it to the site to form an annex, and built an open-air dance floor and skating rink on the property. She is credited with being instrumental in having a bitumen road built between Eimeo and Mackay in 1938.

In the early 1940s, during World War II, the Eimeo Hotel was occupied by American servicemen on rest and recreation leave from New Guinea. The present Pacific Hotel on the site dates from 1954.

The coconut palms were removed in the 1990s, but the mango trees along Mango Avenue, between Whittles Lane and Heidke Street, survive and remain a tourist attraction.

== Description ==
Mango Avenue is characterised by an avenue of mature mango trees (Mangifera indica) extending approximately 150 metres (490 ft) along the road reserve, between Whittles Lane and Heidke Street, heralding the approach to the Pacific Hotel that sits atop a prominent headland (formerly the site of the Eimeo Hotel).

The trees are large mature trees of about 15–20 metres (49–66 ft) tall. There are 16 trees on the western side of the road reserve and 18 on the eastern side, with a large Hoop pine (Araucaria cunninghamii) adjacent to the northernmost tree on the eastern side of the avenue. The canopies of the trees meet, forming a well-shaded tunnel along the road as well as overhanging adjacent properties, despite the spacing of the trunks being sometimes irregular. The trees commonly have evidence of severed lower branches and some sport street numbers for adjacent house blocks.

The road is a narrow strip of bitumen running roughly north–south. There is no curbing and little formal delineation of adjacent property entrances or boundaries on the east side. A concrete pathway exists along the western side of the road reserve, west of the trees. Property entrances on both sides of the roadway are simply sporadic gaps between the tree trunks.

== Heritage listing ==
Mango Avenue was listed on the Queensland Heritage Register on 31 July 2008 having satisfied the following criteria.

The place is important in demonstrating the evolution or pattern of Queensland's history.

The c. 1880s mango trees along Mango Avenue at Eimeo provide important tangible evidence of an early phase of North Queensland tourism, little of which survives in built form. It is associated with the 1880 establishment of one of the Mackay district's first seaside resorts, the Eimeo boarding house/hotel, during a period of strong economic growth in the region.

They are important also in illustrating the use of the mango as a shade tree and for street beautification in tropical Queensland.

The place is important in demonstrating the principal characteristics of a particular class of cultural places.

Once constituting the private entrance to the Eimeo boarding house/hotel, this avenue of Mangifera indica, now over 120 years old, remains an excellent example of a grand-entrance avenue of trees in a coastal setting.

The place is important because of its aesthetic significance.

As an approach avenue of substantial shade trees that leads to a site closely linked to the recreational history of Mackay, the place has long been appreciated for its aesthetic significance. The dramatic tunnel effect of driving through the shady avenue when approaching or leaving the Pacific Hotel (formerly the site of the Eimeo Hotel) generates an aesthetic response known to have been enjoyed by visitors since at least the 1920s, and likely much earlier.
