= Richmond, Queensland (Mackay Region) =

Richmond Mackay, Queensland
- Coordinates: 21.0858°S 149.1405°E
- Population: 852 (2021 census)
  - Density: 80.4/km^{2} (208.2/sq mi)
- Postcode(s): 4740
- Area: 10.6 km^{2} (4.1 sq mi)
- Time zone: AEST (UTC+10:00)
- Location: 10.3 km (6 mi) NNW of Mackay CBD; 962 km (598 mi) NNW of Brisbane
- LGA(s): Mackay Region
- State electorate(s): Whitsunday
- Federal division(s): Dawson
Suburbs around Richmond:
| Nindaroo | Rural View | Rural View |
| Farleigh | Richmond | Beaconsfield |
| Farleigh | Glenella | Mount Pleasant |

Richmond is a north-western suburb of Mackay in the Mackay Region, Queensland, Australia. In the 2021 census, Richmond had a population of 852 people.

== Geography ==
Although officially gazetted as a suburb, most of the land use in Richmond is agricultural, predominantly growing sugarcane. A network of cane tramways in the suburb transfers the harvested sugarcane to the sugar mill for processing.

== History ==
Nindaroo Provisional School opened on 27 February 1899. On 1 January 1909 it became Nindaroo State School It closed in 1963. The school was located at 1 Boveys Road, corner of Mackay Habana Road (21.08220°S 149.14186°E), now in Richmond.

== Demographics ==
In the 2011 census, Richmond had a population of 505 people.

In the 2016 census, Richmond had a population of 486 people.

In the 2021 census, Richmond had a population of 852 people.

== Heritage listings ==
Richmond has a number of heritage-listed sites, including:

- Richmond Mill Ruins, Habana Road

== Education ==
There are no schools in Richmond. The nearest government primary schools are Beaconsfield State School in neighbouring Beaconsfield to the east, Eimeo Road State School in neighbouring Rural View to the north-east, and Northview State School in neighbouring Mount Pleasant to the south-east. The nearest government secondary schools are Mackay Northern Beaches State High School in neighbouring Rural View to the north-east, Pioneer State High School in Andergrove to the east, and Mackay North State High School in North Mackay.

== See also ==
- List of tramways in Queensland
