= Dolphin Heads, Queensland =

Dolphin Heads Mackay, Queensland
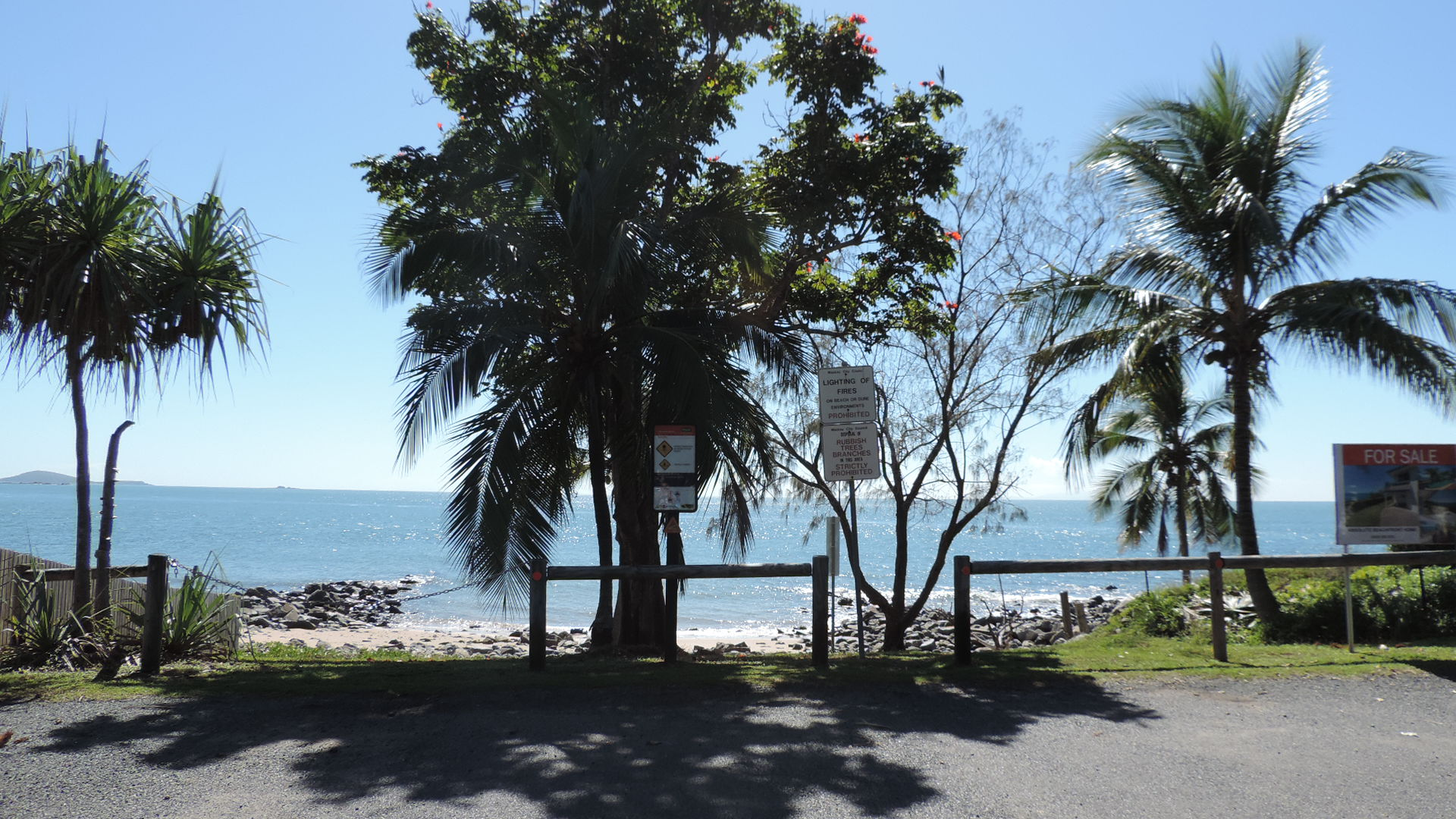
- Looking out to the Coral Sea from the northern point of Dolphin Heads, 2016.

- Coordinates: 21.0398°S 149.1860°E
- Population: 413 (2021 census)
  - Density: 459/km^{2} (1,190/sq mi)
- Postcode(s): 4740
- Area: 0.9 km^{2} (0.3 sq mi)
- Time zone: AEST (UTC+10:00)
- Location: 4.9 km (3 mi) NW of Rural View; 16.5 km (10 mi) N of Mackay CBD; 354 km (220 mi) NNW of Rockhampton; 985 km (612 mi) NNW of Brisbane
- LGA(s): Mackay Region
- State electorate(s): Whitsunday
- Federal division(s): Dawson
Localities around Dolphin Heads:
Coral Sea	Coral Sea	Coral Sea
Eimeo	Dolphin Heads	Coral Sea
Eimeo	Blacks Beach	Coral Sea

Dolphin Heads is a coastal town and northern suburb of Mackay in the Mackay Region, Queensland, Australia. In the 2021 census, the suburb of Dolphin Heads had a population of 413 people.

== Geography ==
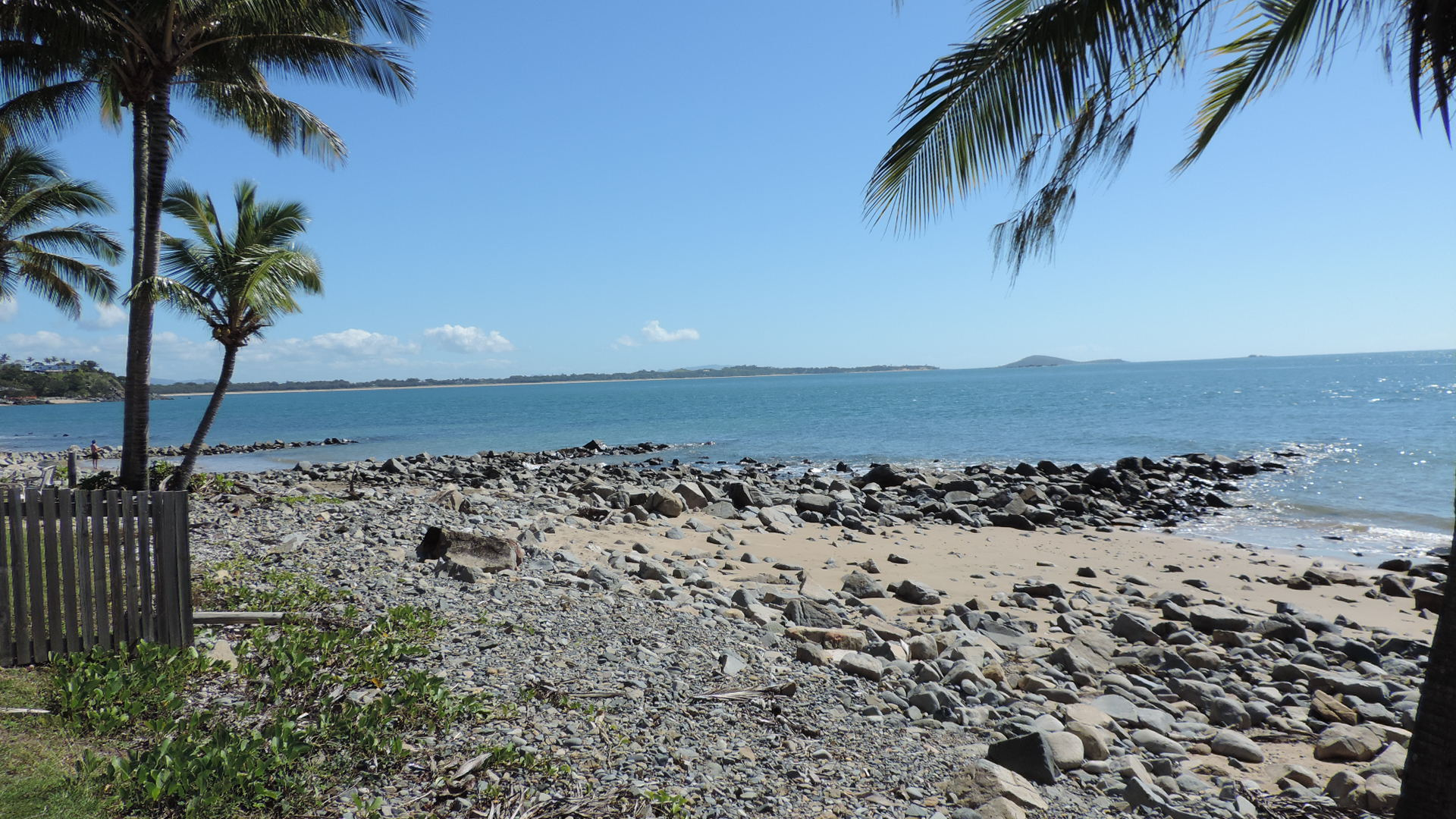
Northern point of Dolphin Heads, 2016

The waters of the Coral Sea form the eastern boundary and much of the northern boundary.

== History ==
The town was named on 9 October 1982. The locality was named and bounded on 3 September 1999.

== Demographics ==
In the 2016 census, the suburb of Dolphin Heads had a population of 388 people.

In the 2021 census, the suburb of Dolphin Heads had a population of 413 people.

== Education ==
There are no schools in Dolphin Heads. The nearest government primary school is Eimeo Road State School in Rural View to the south-west. The nearest government secondary school is Mackay Northern Beaches State High School, also in Rural View.

== Amenities ==
There is a park in Hermitage Drive (21.0451°S 149.1825°E).

== Hazards ==
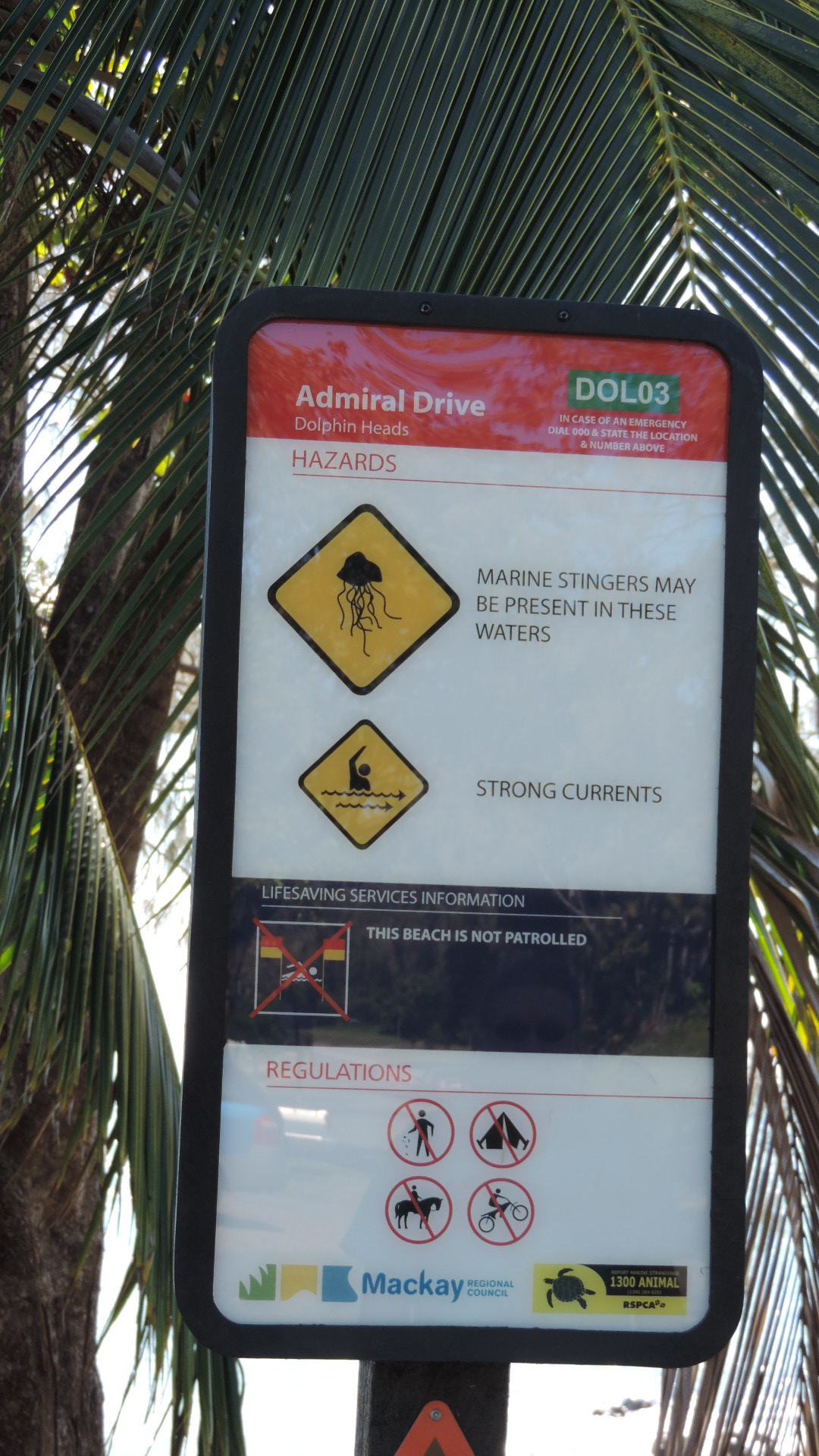
Beach warning sign, Dolphin Heads, 2016

The waters off Dolphin Heads can have strong currents and marine stingers.
