= Eimeo =

Eimeo may refer to the following places:

- Moʼorea, Tahiti, formerly known as Eimeo
- Eimeo, Queensland, a town in Australia
