= Mackay Harbour, Queensland =

Mackay Harbour
- Suburb
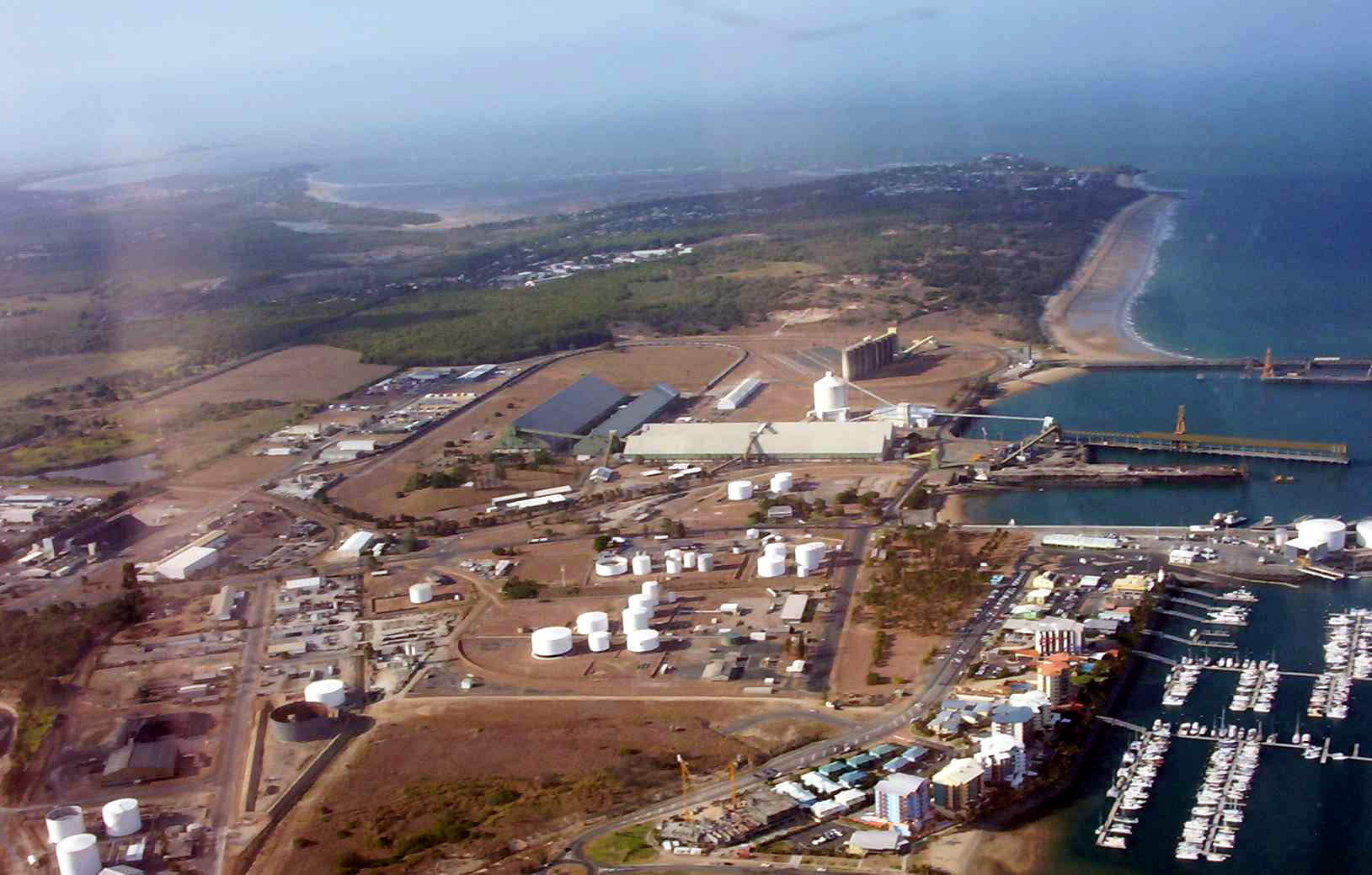
- Aerial view of Mackay Harbour, 2005

- Interactive map of Mackay Harbour
- Coordinates: 21.1061°S 149.2141°E
- Country: Australia
- State: Queensland
- City: Mackay
- LGA: Mackay Region
- Location: 4.8 km (3.0 mi) NE of Mackay CBD; 341 km (212 mi) NNW of Rockhampton; 389 km (242 mi) SE of Townsville; 981 km (610 mi) NNW of Brisbane

Government
  - State electorate: Mackay
  - Federal division: Dawson

Area
  - Total: 14.4 km^{2} (5.6 sq mi)

Population
  - Total: 686 (2021 census)
  - Density: 47.64/km^{2} (123.4/sq mi)
- Time zone: UTC+10:00 (AEST)
- Postcode: 4740
Suburbs around Mackay Harbour
Andergrove	Slade Point	Slade Point
North Mackay	Mackay Harbour	Coral Sea
North Mackay	Cremorne	Coral Sea

Mackay Harbour is a coastal mixed-use locality in the Mackay Region, Queensland, Australia. In the 2021 census, Mackay Harbour had a population of 686 people.

== Geography ==
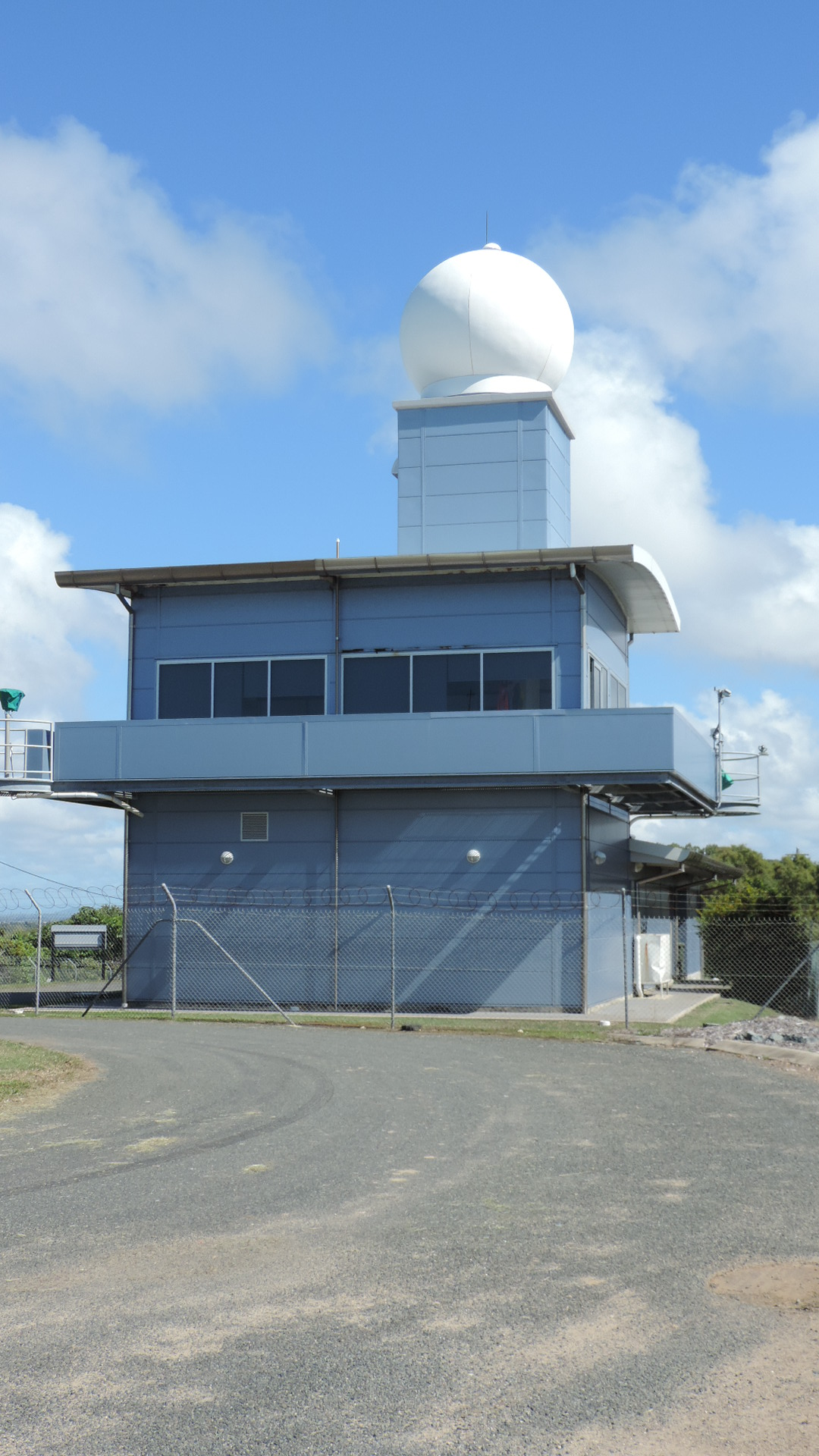
Bureau of Meteorology weather station at Mount Bassett, 2016

The locality of Mackay Harbour is bounded to the east by the Coral Sea and to the south by the Pioneer River. It has the following headlands (clockwise):

- Forgan Smith Point (21.1044°S 149.2323°E)
- Bagley Point (21.1064°S 149.2348°E)
- East Point (21.1469°S 149.2206°E)
- Fishermans Point (21.1402°S 149.2158°E)

The land is mostly low-lying and much of it is wetlands. However, Mount Bassett in the south of the locality rises to 64 metres (210 ft) above sea level (21.11650°S 149.20637°E).

Apart from the wetlands, the land use is mixed. The Port of Mackay is located on the oceanside supported by a number of associated industrial facilities (21.1038°S 149.2265°E).

To the immediate south of the port is a residential and tourism development called Mackay Marina Village with 479 marina berths (21.11129°S 149.22407°E).

There is a quarry on Mount Bassett extracting rocks and other materials for road building and construction. There is a caravan park to the north-west of the mountain (21.1128°S 149.2060°E), while the Mount Bassett Cemetery is south of the mountain (21.1186°S 149.2089°E). A Bureau of Meteorology weather station is on the east of the mountain (21.11728°S 149.21717°E) with an adjacent public lookout.

The port is served by the Mackay Harbour railway station (21.1063°S 149.2163°E) on the Mackay Harbour branch line of the North Coast railway line with its junction at Erakala / Glenella. It is a single track without passing loops.

== History ==
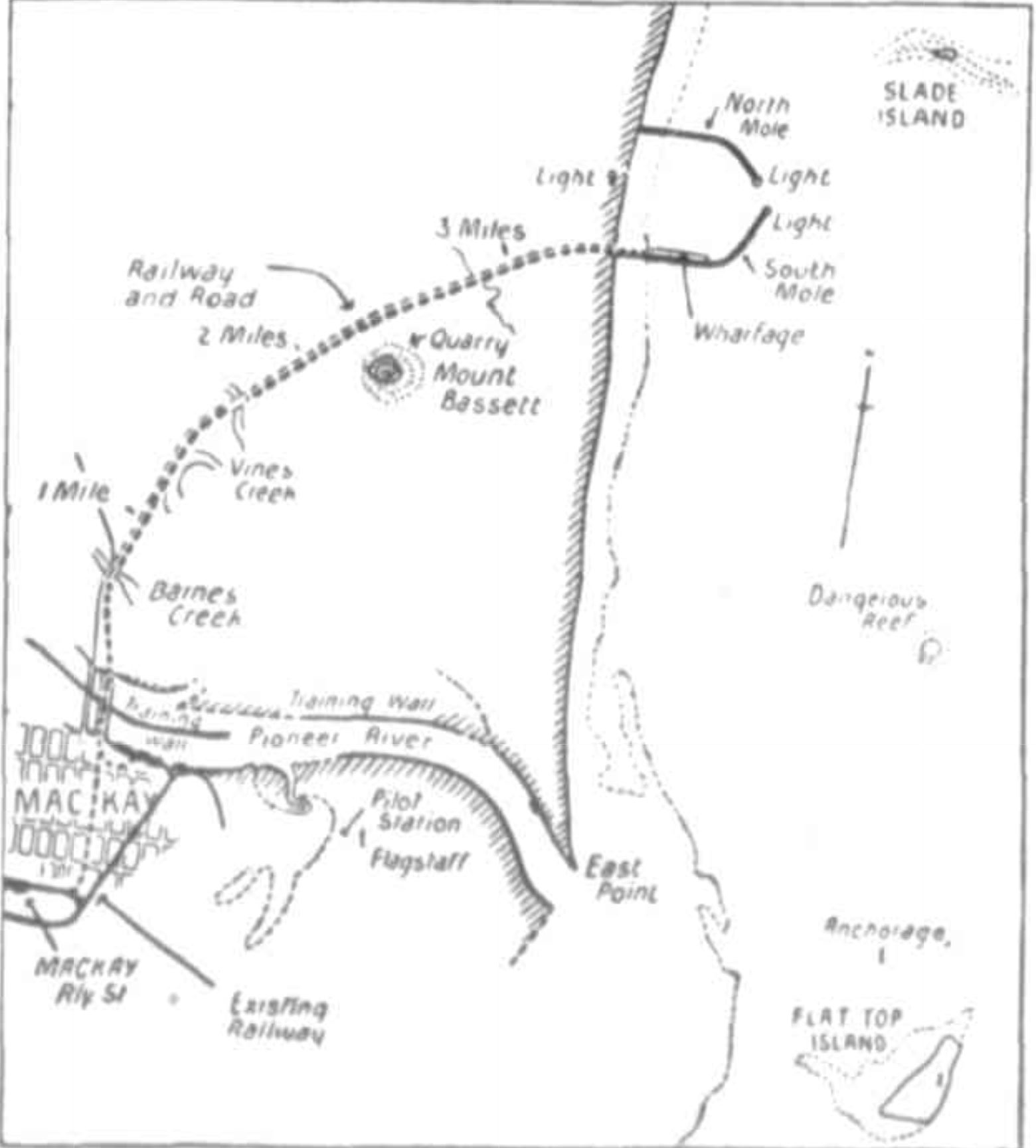
Sketch map of Mackay Harbour, 1939

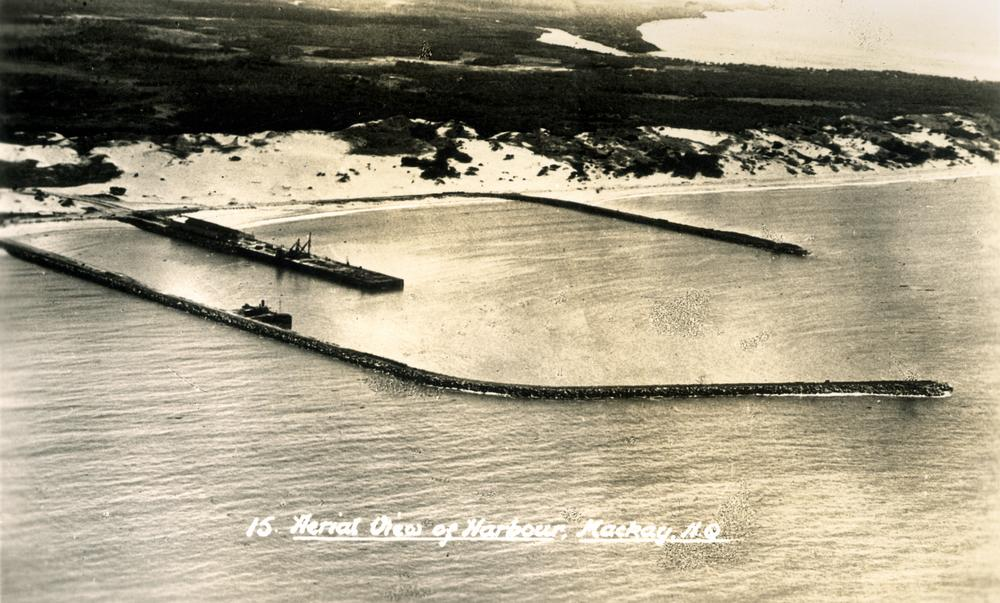
Aerial view of Mackay Harbour, circa 1939

When Mackay was first settled, ships came into port in the Pioneer River. However, by 1884, there were problems accommodating larger ships in the river. Although a new port had been desired since 1887, there was no progress in building one until the Australian Government provided a grant of £250,000 and a loan of £1,000,000 in 1933. Work started on the port with the laying of a foundation stone on 14 September 1935. On 27 August 1939, the new deep water port was officially opened by Queensland Premier William Forgan Smith. It was an occasion for extensive celebrations in Mackay.

On 1 July 1968, the Queensland Place Names Board officially named the locality Mackay Harbour.

In 1981, the current Mackay Harbour Branch was opened, replacing an earlier branch railway that took a different route via the Mackay CBD.

In 1989, a bulk sugar terminal was opened and became the largest storage facility for sugar in the world.

In 1989, the Mackay Marina opened on the Harbour Beach shoreline with the Marina Village being a residential and tourist precinct.

== Demographics ==
In the 2016 census, Mackay Harbour had a population of 555 people.

In the 2021 census, Mackay Harbour had a population of 686 people.

== Economy ==
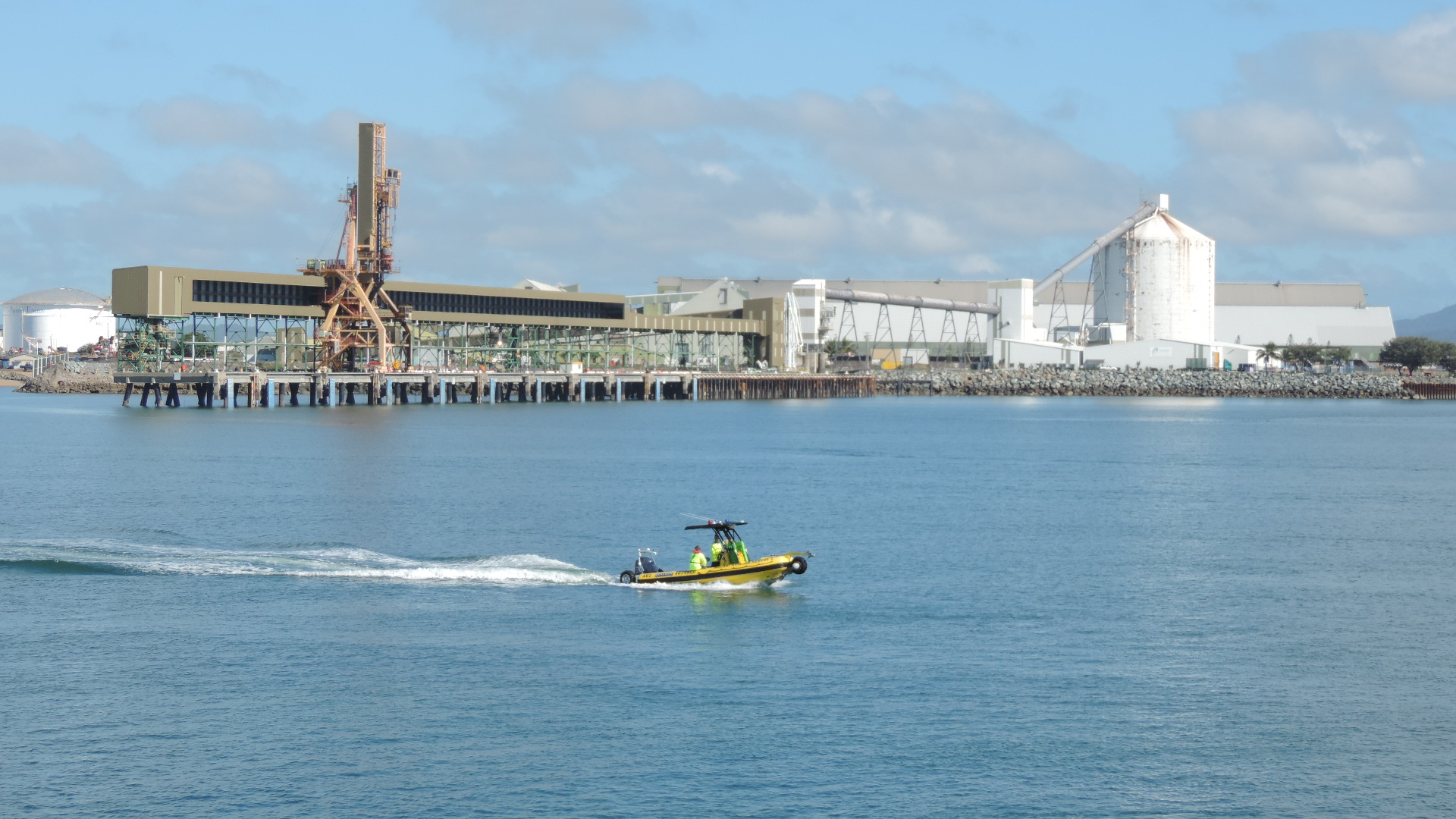
Port of Mackay, 2016

The Port of Mackay is the fourth largest multi-commodity port in Queensland, servicing both the mining and agricultural industries in Central Queensland. The port has one of the world's largest bulk sugar terminals, reflecting the extensive sugarcane industry in and around the Mackay Region. Coal from the Bowen Basin and Galilee Basin is exported through the port.

In the 2017-2018 financial year, the port handled over 3 million tonnes of cargo, including 1,573,629 tonnes of fuel, 876,519 tonnes of sugar and 148,245 tonnes of grain.

== Education ==
There are no schools in Mackay Harbour. The nearest government primary and secondary schools are Mackay North State School and Mackay North State High School, both in neighbouring North Mackay to the west.

== Amenities ==
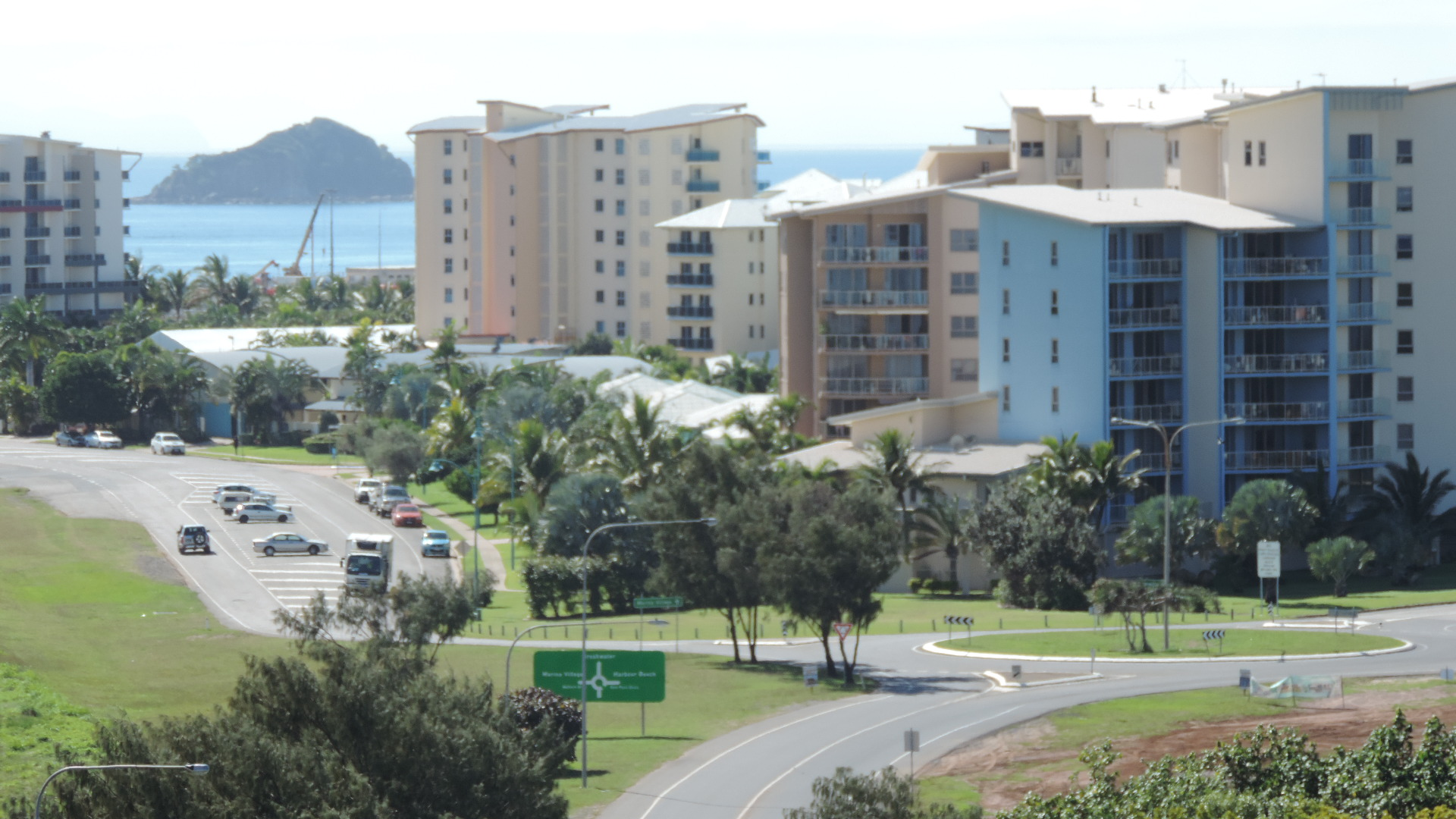
Mackay Marina Village as seen from Mount Bassett, 2016

There is a sandy beach south of the marina with the adjacent Mackay Surf Lifesaving Club (21.11842°S 149.22270°E).

There is a lookout on Mount Bassett (21.11733°S 149.21768°E) beside the weather station.

There are a number of parks in the locality (from north to south):

- Gillhams Park (21.1024°S 149.1956°E)
- Melaleuca Forest (21.1025°S 149.2155°E)
- Mulherin Park (21.1209°S 149.2214°E)
- East Point Drive Park (21.1388°S 149.2180°E)
