= Mount Pleasant, Queensland (Mackay Region) =

Mount Pleasant
- Suburb
- Coordinates: 21.1169°S 149.1580°E
- Country: Australia
- State: Queensland
- City: Mackay
- LGA: Mackay Region
- Location: 5.4 km (3.4 mi) NW of Mackay CBD; 343 km (213 mi) NNW of Rockhampton; 382 km (237 mi) SE of Townsville; 957 km (595 mi) NNW of Brisbane

Government
  - State electorate: Mackay
  - Federal division: Dawson

Area
  - Total: 3.9 km^{2} (1.5 sq mi)

Population
  - Total: 4,694 (2021 census)
  - Density: 1,204/km^{2} (3,120/sq mi)
- Time zone: UTC+10:00 (AEST)
- Postcode: 4740
Suburbs around Mount Pleasant
Richmond	Beaconsfield	Andergrove
Glenella	Mount Pleasant	North Mackay
Foulden	West Mackay	Mackay

Mount Pleasant is a suburb in the Mackay Region, Queensland, Australia. In the 2021 census, Mount Pleasant had a population of 4,694 people.

== Geography ==
The suburb is bounded by Fursden Creek and the Pioneer River to the south, by Hicks Street and the Bruce Highway to the south-west, by Murrays Road and Pioneer Road to the west, the branch line of North Coast railway line to the Port of Mackay) to the north, and Norris Road and Willetts Road to the east.

Historically farming land, the current land use is almost entirely residential, apart from a parcel of farmland in the north of suburb, to the east of the Mackay Bucasia Road.

== History ==
Northview State School opened on 28 January 1986.

On 11 August 1987 the school building of the closed Mount Pelion State School was relocated to Northview State School in Mount Pleasant but it gradually fell into disrepair. On 24 October 2014 the building was moved to Sarina to be restored as part of the Sarina Tourist Art and Craft Visitor Information Centre in Railway Square.

Emmanuel Catholic School was established in 1983 by the Marist Sisters under the leadership of Sister Joan McBride. Initially a primary school offering Years 1 to 7, in 1984 the school commenced Year 8 education rising to Year 10 in 1986. In 1990 the school was renamed Emmanuel College. In 1996 with an enrolment of over 900 students, the school was split was split into a primary school, Emmanuel Catholic Primary School and a secondary school to Year 12, Holy Spirit College.

== Demographics ==
In the 2011 census, Mount Pleasant had a population of 4,751 people.

In the 2016 census, Mount Pleasant had a population of 4,444 people.

In the 2021 census, Mount Pleasant had a population of 4,694 people.

== Education ==
Northview State School is a government primary (Prep–6) school for boys and girls at 54 Pioneer Street (21.1098°S 149.1509°E). In 2018, the school had an enrolment of 393 students with 34 teachers (28 full-time equivalent) and 32 non-teaching staff (18 full-time equivalent). It includes a special education program.

Emmanuel Catholic Primary School is a Catholic primary (Prep–6) school for boys and girls at Baxter Drive (21.1107°S 149.1572°E). In 2018, the school had an enrolment of 576 students with 32 teachers (30 full-time equivalent) and 25 non-teaching staff (13 full-time equivalent).

Holy Spirit College is a Catholic secondary (7–12) school for boys and girls at Baxter Drive (21.1103°S 149.1574°E). In 2018, the school had an enrolment of 810 students with 65 teachers (63 full-time equivalent) and 49 non-teaching staff (36 full-time equivalent).

There is no government secondary school in Mount Pleasant. The nearest government secondary school is Mackay North State High School in neighbouring North Mackay to the east.

== Amenities ==
Mount Pleasant Shopping Centre is a shopping mall on Mackay Bucasia Road between Phillip Street and Malcomson Street (21.1186°S 149.1591°E). Its anchor tenants are the supermarkets Coles and Woolworths and the discount store KMart, with over 70 speciality stores.

The Mackay Regional Council operates the Gordon White library at 54 Phillip Street (21.1173°S 149.1601°E).

Mackay Private Hospital is at 57 Norris Road (21.1137°S 149.1673°E).

Carlyle Gardens Mackay is a 16.74-hectare (41.4-acre) retirement village at 206 Phillips Street (21.1114°S 149.1673°E).
