= Blacks Beach, Queensland =

Blacks Beach Mackay, Queensland
- Coordinates: 21.0627°S 149.1877°E
- Population: 4,153 (2021 census)
  - Density: 639/km^{2} (1,655/sq mi)
- Postcode(s): 4740
- Area: 6.5 km^{2} (2.5 sq mi)
- Time zone: AEST (UTC+10:00)
- Location: 15.9 km (10 mi) N of Mackay CBD; 392 km (244 mi) SE of Townsville; 969 km (602 mi) NNW of Brisbane
- LGA(s): Mackay Region
- State electorate(s): Whitsunday; Mackay
- Federal division(s): Dawson
Suburbs around Blacks Beach:
| Eimeo | Dolphin Heads | Coral Sea |
| Rural View | Blacks Beach | Coral Sea |
| Beaconsfield | Andergrove | Slade Point |

Blacks Beach is a coastal suburb, one of the "northern beaches" of the city of Mackay in the Mackay Region, Queensland, Australia. In the 2021 census, Blacks Beach had a population of 4,153 people.

== Geography ==
Blacks Beach boasts a continuous 6 kilometres (3.7 mi) beach, the longest in the Mackay region. It is popular for watersports.

== History ==
The suburb is named after Maurice Hume Black, who operated The Cedars sugar plantation and mill from 1871. The mill closed in 1885 and the plantation then crushed their sugarcane at the River Estate sugar mill. Black had originally lived on the plantation but later moved to the coast.

== Demographics ==
In the 2016 census, Blacks Beach had a population of 2,871 people.

In the 2016 census, Blacks Beach had a population of 3,861 people.

In the 2021 census, Blacks Beach had a population of 4,153 people.

== Education ==
There are no schools in Blacks Beach. The nearest government primary schools are Eimeo Road State School in neighbouring Rural View to the west and Andergrove State School in neighbouring Andergrove to the south. The nearest government secondary schools are Mackay Northern Beaches State High School in Rural View and Pioneer State High School in Andergrove.

== Amenities ==
The Mackay Regional Council operates a mobile library service on a fortnightly schedule at Blacks Beach Road.

There are a number of parks in the suburb, including:

- Blacks Beach Park (21.0474°S 149.1891°E)
- Botha Street Park (21.0474°S 149.1849°E)
- Carbeen Street Park (21.0774°S 149.1879°E)
- Corella Way Park (21.0643°S 149.1957°E)
- Emperor Drive Park (21.0792°S 149.1817°E)
- Mclaughlin Drive Park (21.0471°S 149.1832°E)
- Narrabeen Street (21.0576°S 149.1885°E)
- Newport Parade Park (21.0624°S 149.1828°E)
