= Eimeo, Queensland =

Eimeo Mackay, Queensland
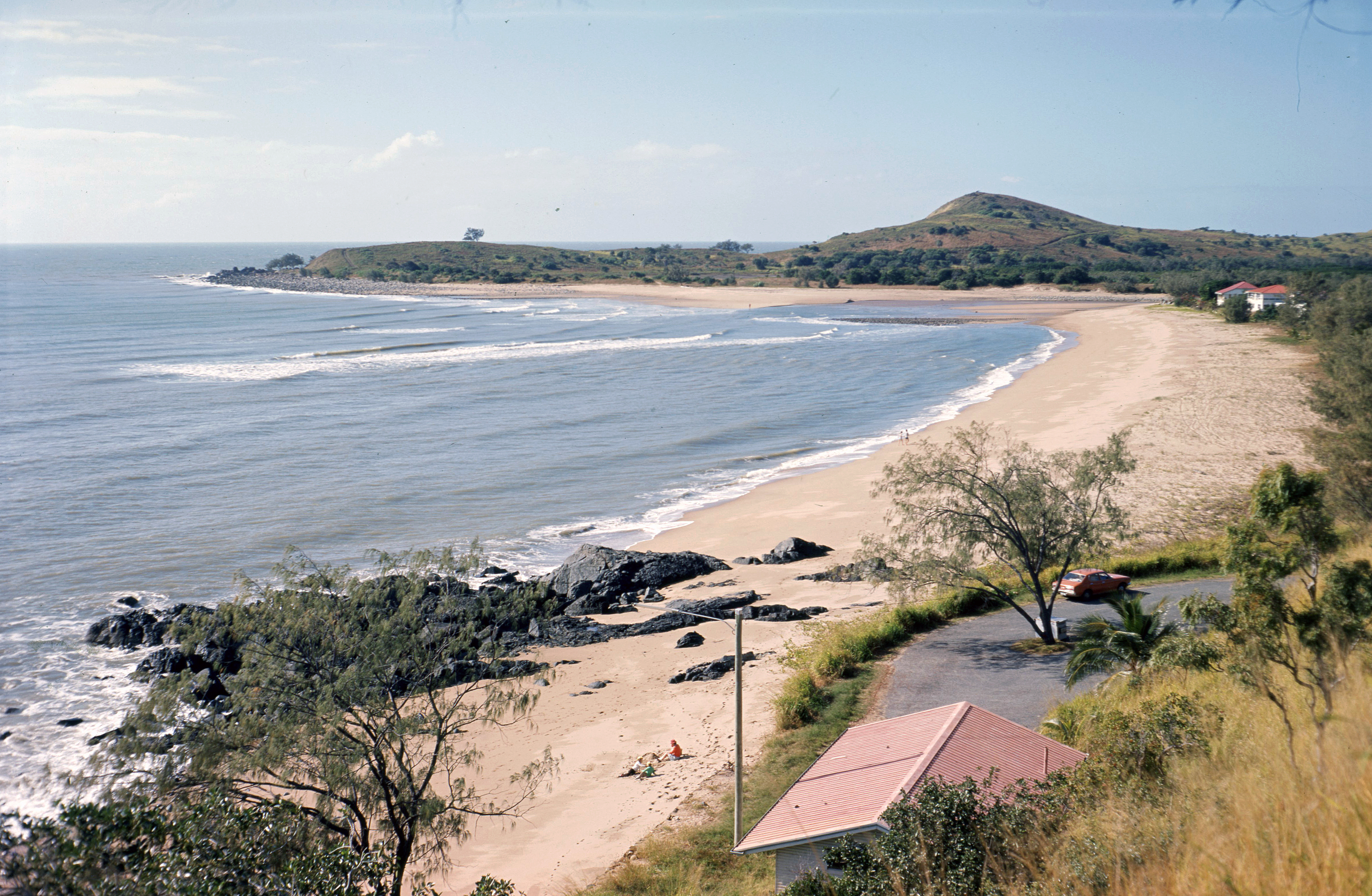
- Eimeo Beach, 1976.jpg

- Coordinates: 21.0362°S 149.1763°E
- Population: 3,285 (2021 census)
  - Density: 966/km^{2} (2,500/sq mi)
- Postcode(s): 4740
- Area: 3.4 km^{2} (1.3 sq mi)
- Time zone: AEST (UTC+10:00)
- Location: 14 km (9 mi) N of Mackay CBD; 970 km (603 mi) NNW of Brisbane
- LGA(s): Mackay Region
- State electorate(s): Whitsunday
- Federal division(s): Dawson
Localities around Eimeo:
Bucasia	Coral Sea	Dolphin Heads
Bucasia	Eimeo	Blacks Beach
Rural View	Rural View	Blacks Beach

Eimeo is a coastal town and suburb in the Mackay Region, Queensland, Australia. In the 2021 census, the suburb of Eimeo had a population of 3,285 people.

== Geography ==
Eimeo has a headland that extends north into the Coral Sea. The point of the headland is rocky but the eastern and western sides of the headland have sandy beaches. Sunset Bay is to the west of the headland extending into neighbouring Bucasia (21.0346°S 149.1709°E). Eimeo Creek flows into Sunset Bay and forms the boundary between the Eimeo and Bucasia (21.0381°S 149.1713°E).

== History ==
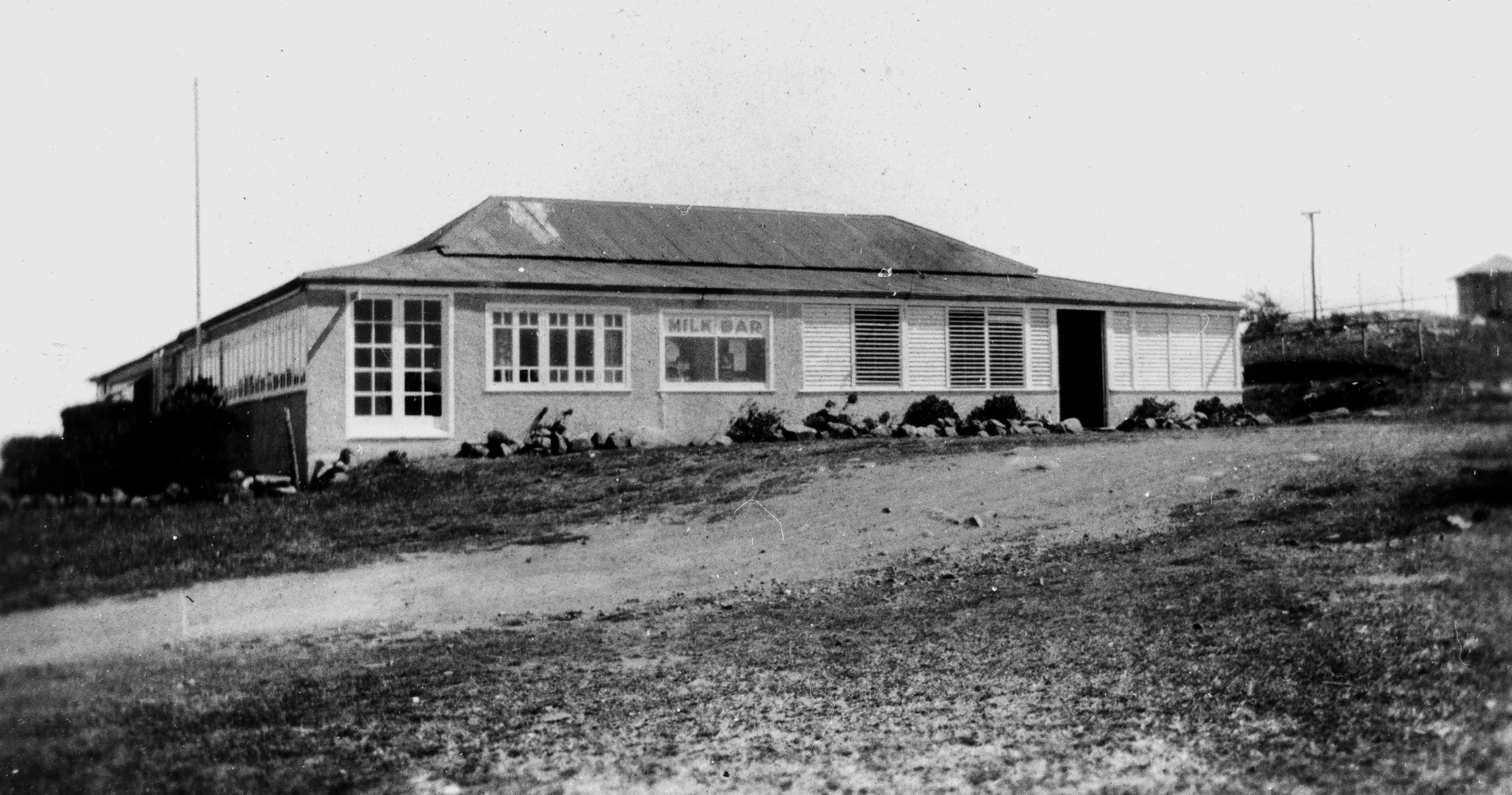
Eimeo Hotel, circa 1935

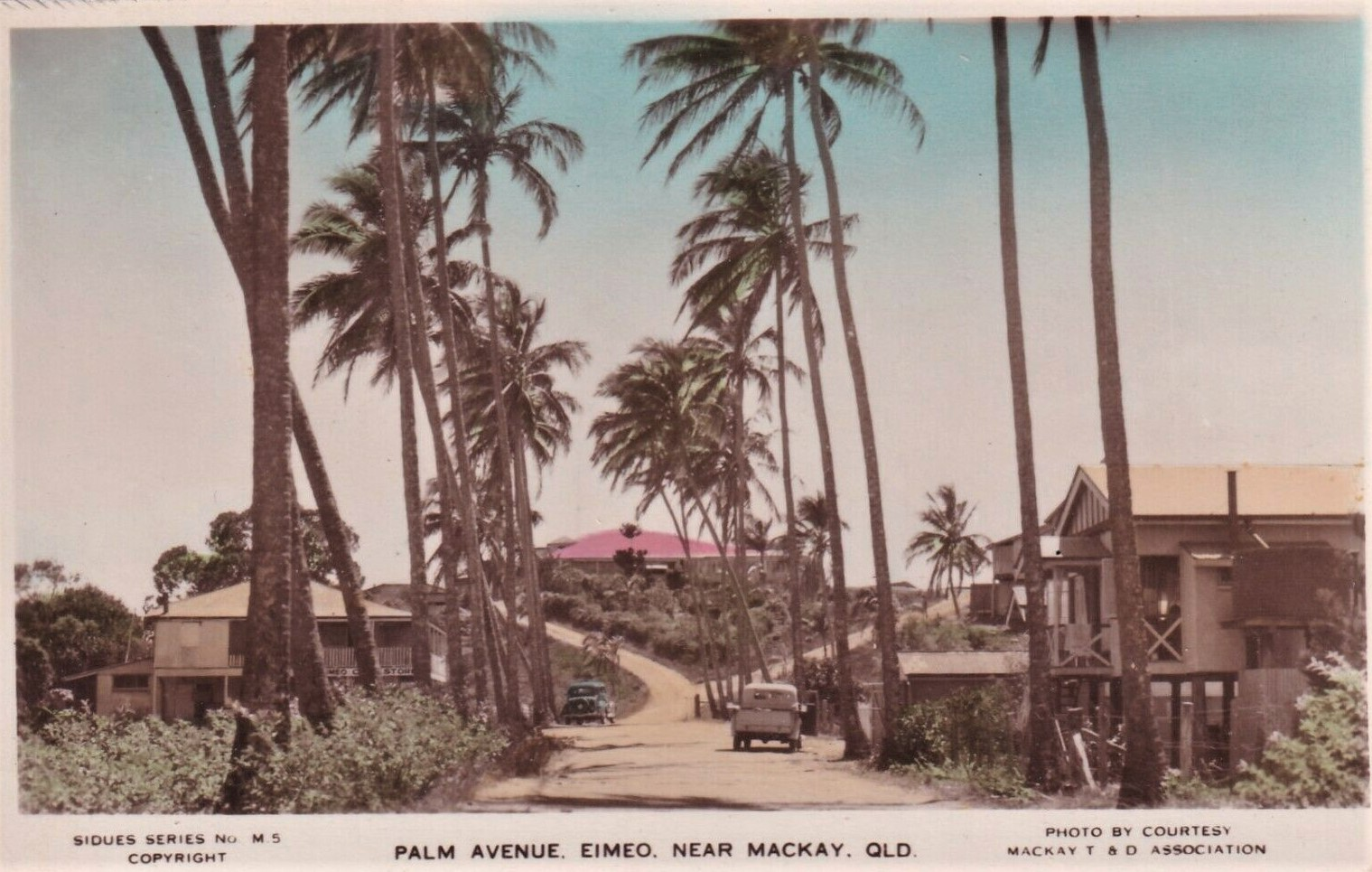
Palm Avenue, circa 1940

The name Eimeo was derived from selection name used by Jeremiah Downs Armitage, an early settler in the 1870s, after his birthplace Moorea (also called Eimeo) in Tahiti. His father Elijah Armitage was a missionary in the South Seas. Armitage engaged in many occupations, including timber cutting, fruit growing and operating a boarding house and/or hotel. Armitage's lasting legacy to the area is the avenue of mango trees he planted, probably in the 1880s, to delineate the track leading from the main Mackay access road, through his property, to his boarding house/hotel. These trees survive to the present day and are listed on the Queensland Heritage Register. Palm Avenue is also a significant and well known feature of the suburb.

Eimeo Road State School opened on 5 February 1934. It is the largest primary school in the Whitsunday Region, Mackay Region and Isaac Region but is no longer within the boundaries of the Eimeo but within the neighbouring suburb of Rural View.

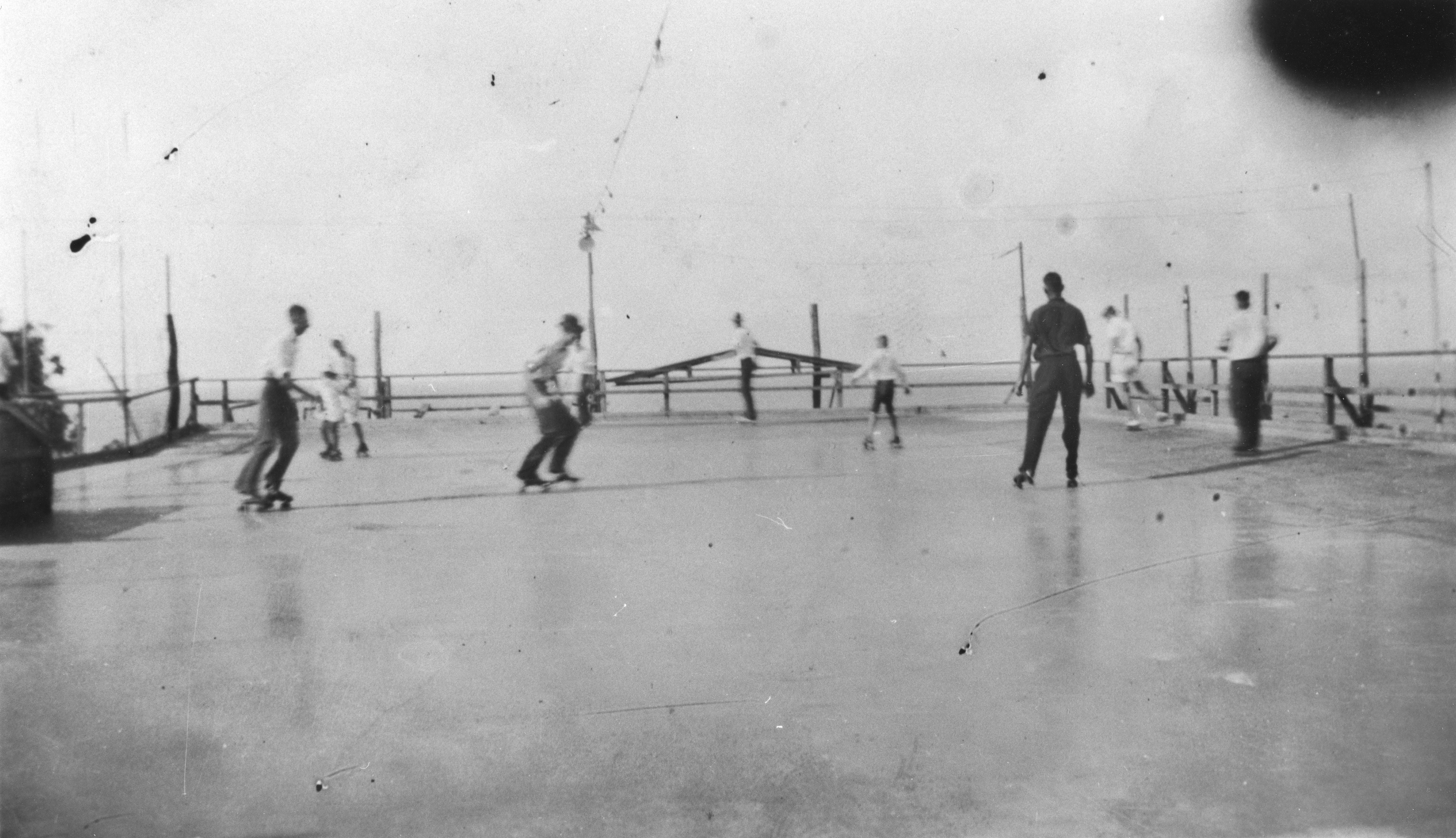
Roller skating rink, 1939

In the 1930s a roller skating rink was established next to the hotel. Eimeo Post Office opened on 24 January 1949 and closed in 1972. The present Eimeo Pacific Hotel was built in 1954 on the site of Armitage's boarding house.

== Demographics ==
In the 2011 census, the suburb of Eimeo had a population of 3,309 people.

In the 2016 census, the suburb of Eimeo had a population of 3,230 people.

In the 2021 census, the suburb of Eimeo had a population of 3,285 people.

== Heritage listings ==
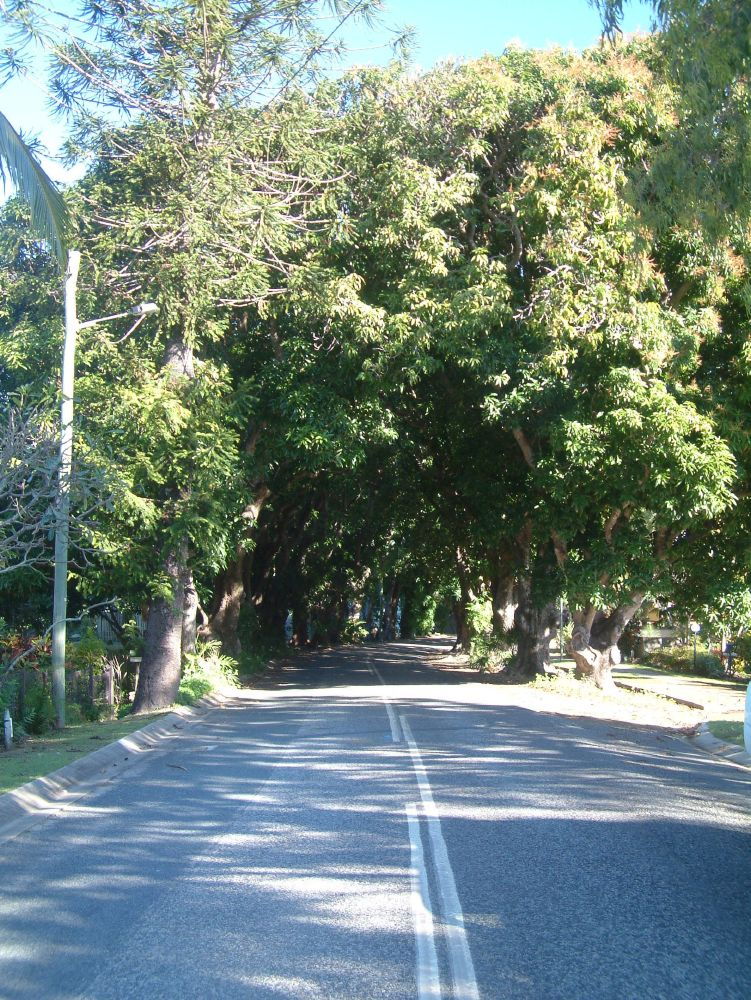
Mango Avenue

Eimeo has a number of heritage-listed sites, including:

- Mango Avenue, Mango Avenue (between Whittles Lane and Heidke Street, 21.036°S 149.1756°E)

== Education ==
There are no schools in Eimeo. The nearest government primary and secondary schools are Eimeo Road State School and Mackay Northern Beaches State High School, both in neighbouring Rural View to the south.

== Amenities ==
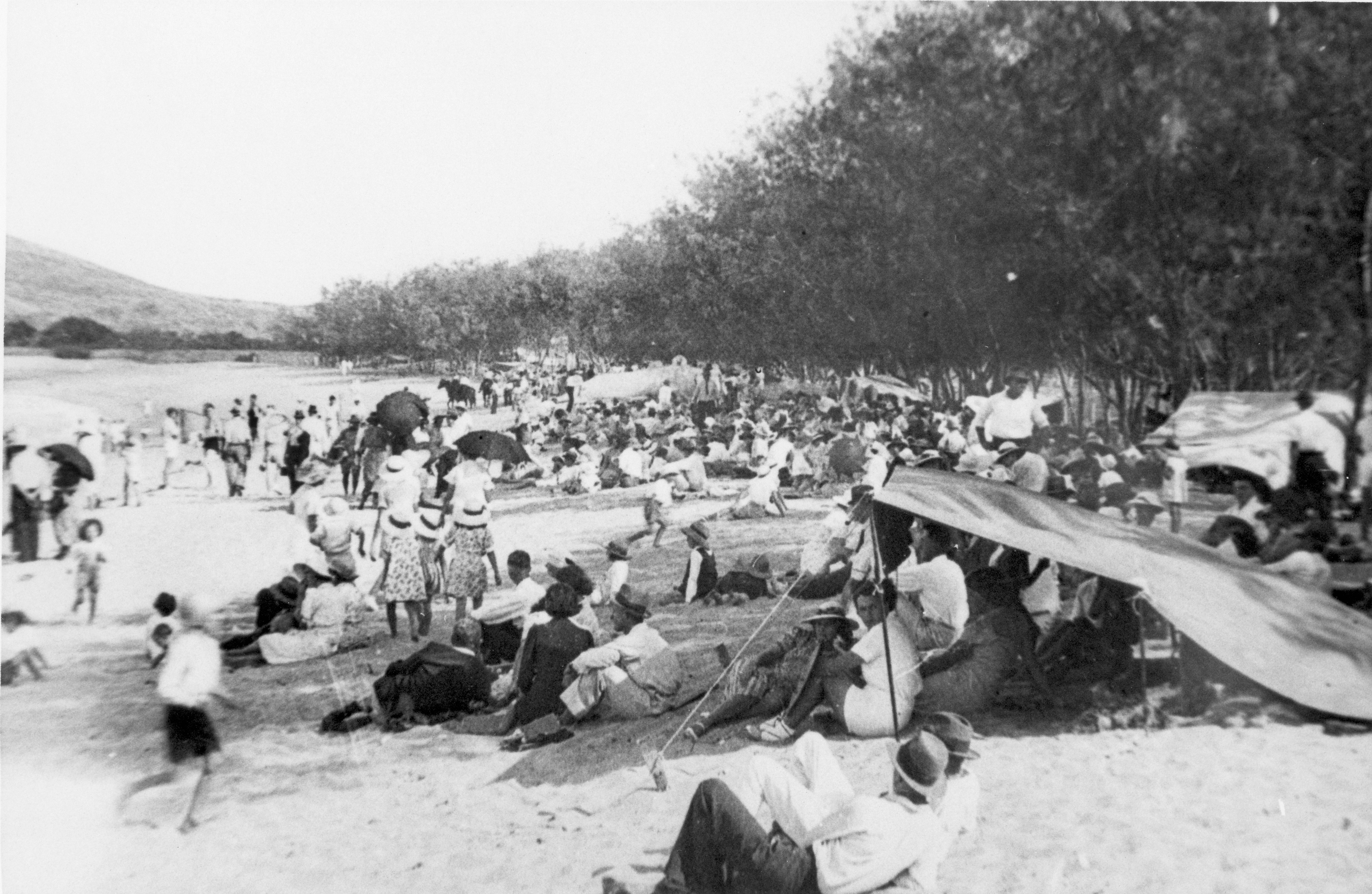
Enjoying Eimeo Beach

Eimeo Pacific Hotel is on the northern tip of the headland at 1 Mango Avenue (21.0329°S 149.1762°E).

Eimeo Surf Lifesaving Club is a surf life saving club on the beach immediately east and below the hotel (21.0331°S 149.1768°E).

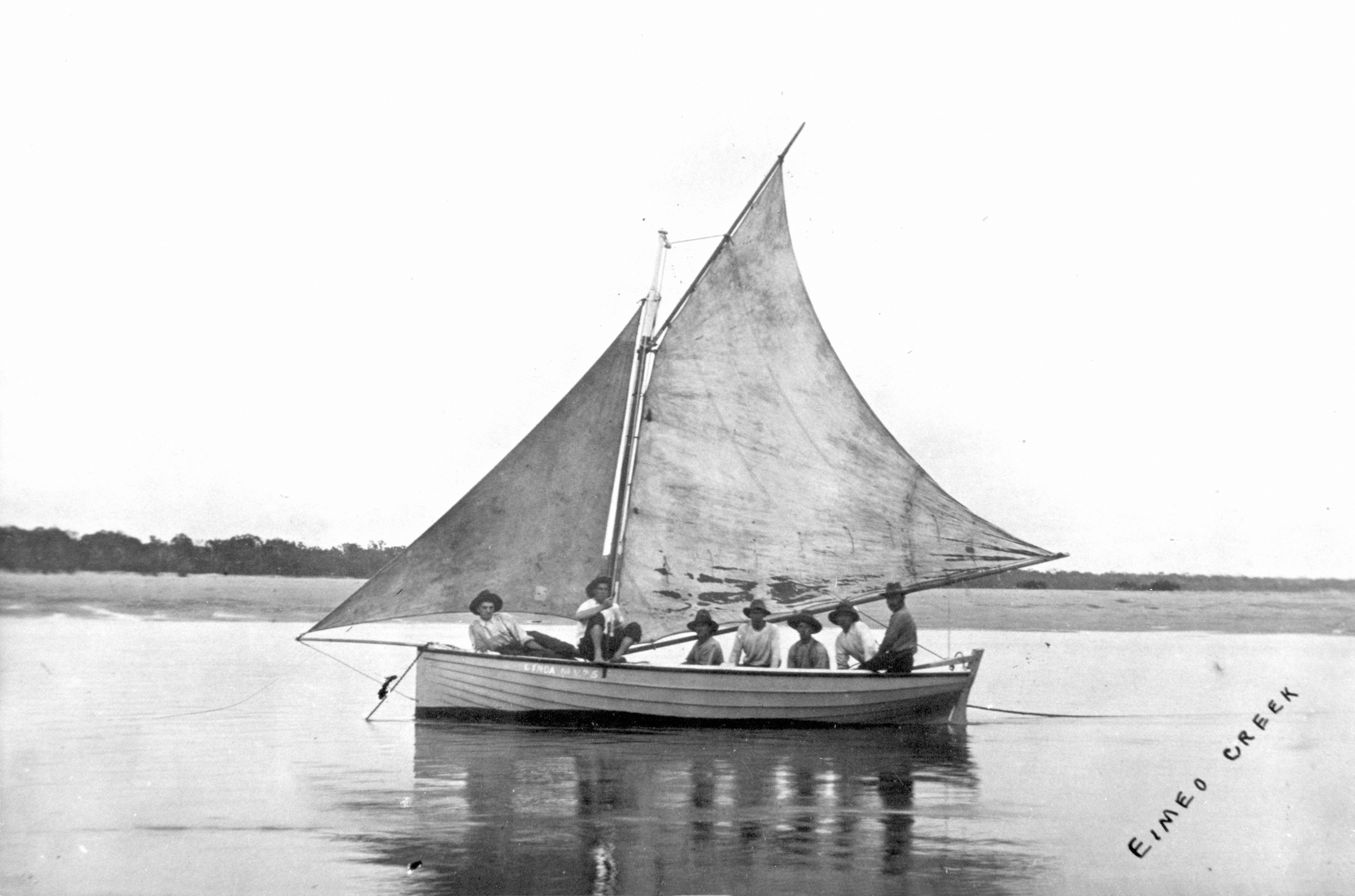
Seven lads in a boat at Eimeo Creek

There is a boat ramp at Sunset Boulevard into Eimeo Creek (21.0373°S 149.1738°E). It is managed by the Mackay Regional Council.

There are a number of parks in the area, including:

- Barber Drive Park (21.0521°S 149.1806°E)
- Barber Park (21.0521°S 149.1811°E)
- Botha Street Park (21.0474°S 149.1849°E)
- Busuttin Drive Park (21.0519°S 149.1694°E)
- Eulbertie Ave Park (21.0568°S 149.1721°E)
- Hermitage Drive Park (21.0451°S 149.1825°E)
- Langer Drive Park (21.0505°S 149.1761°E)
- Mango Ave Park (21.0356°S 149.1769°E)
- Mclaughlin Drive Park (21.0472°S 149.1831°E)
- Shann Street Park (21.0405°S 149.1792°E)
