= Slade Point, Queensland =

Slade Point
- Town
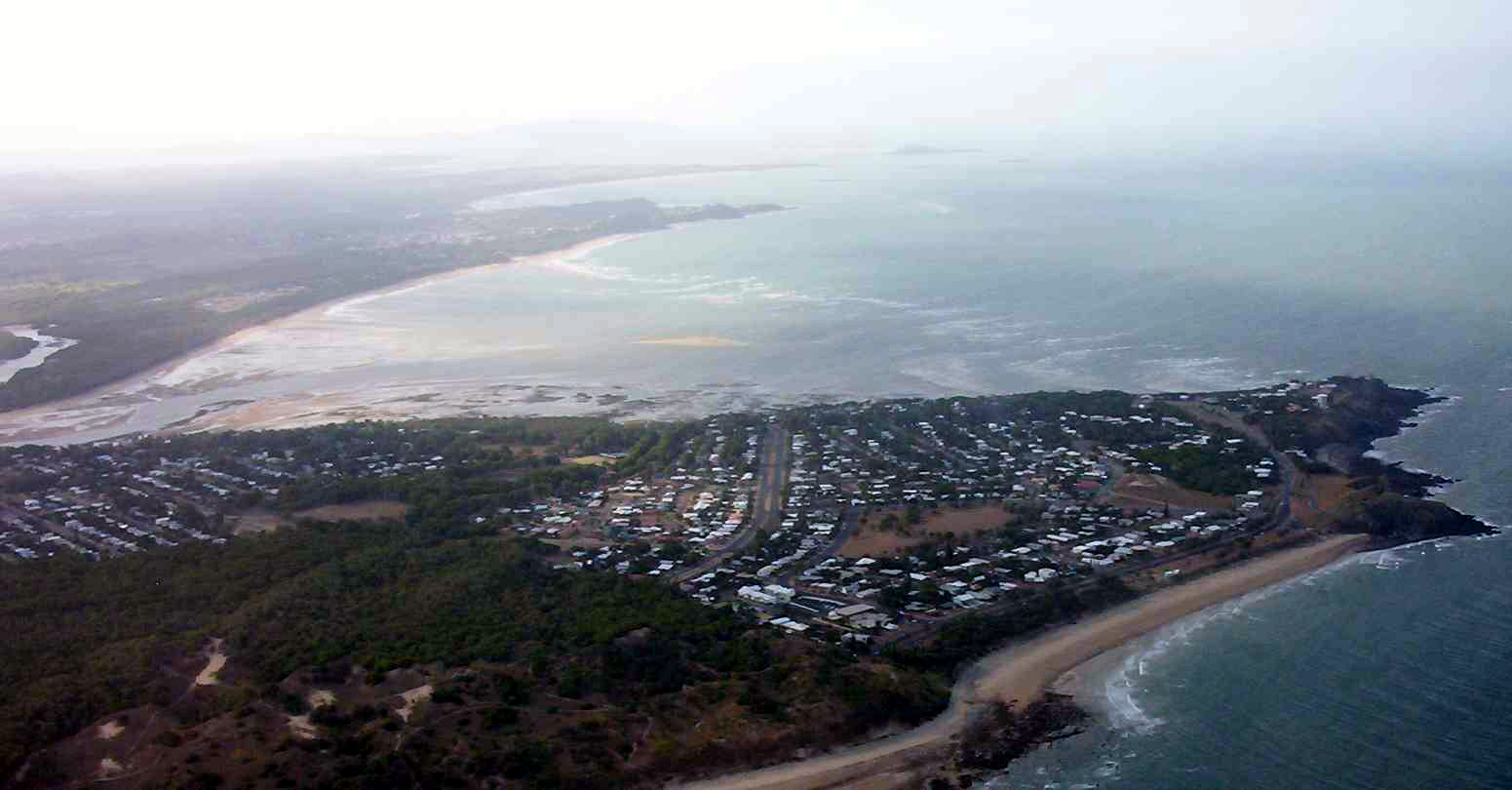
- Aerial view of Slade Point, 2005

- Interactive map of Slade Point
- Coordinates: 21.0711°S 149.2236°E
- Country: Australia
- State: Queensland
- City: Mackay
- LGA: Mackay Region
- Location: 8.7 km (5.4 mi) NNE of Mackay CBD; 9,999,999 km (6,213,711 mi) NNW of Rockhampton; 392 km (244 mi) SE of Townsville; 982 km (610 mi) NNW of Brisbane

Government
  - State electorate: Mackay
  - Federal division: Dawson

Area
  - Total: 7.2 km^{2} (2.8 sq mi)

Population
  - Total: 3,450 (2021 census)
  - Density: 479/km^{2} (1,241/sq mi)
- Time zone: UTC+10:00 (AEST)
- Postcode: 4740
Localities around Slade Point
Blacks Beach	Coral Sea	Coral Sea
Andergrove	Slade Point	Mackay Harbour
Andergrove	Mackay Harbour	Mackay Harbour

Slade Point is a coastal town and peninsular suburb in the Mackay Region, Queensland, Australia. It takes its name from the Slade Point headland named by James Cook on his 1770 voyage. In the 2021 census, the suburb of Slade Point had a population of 3,450 people.

== Geography ==
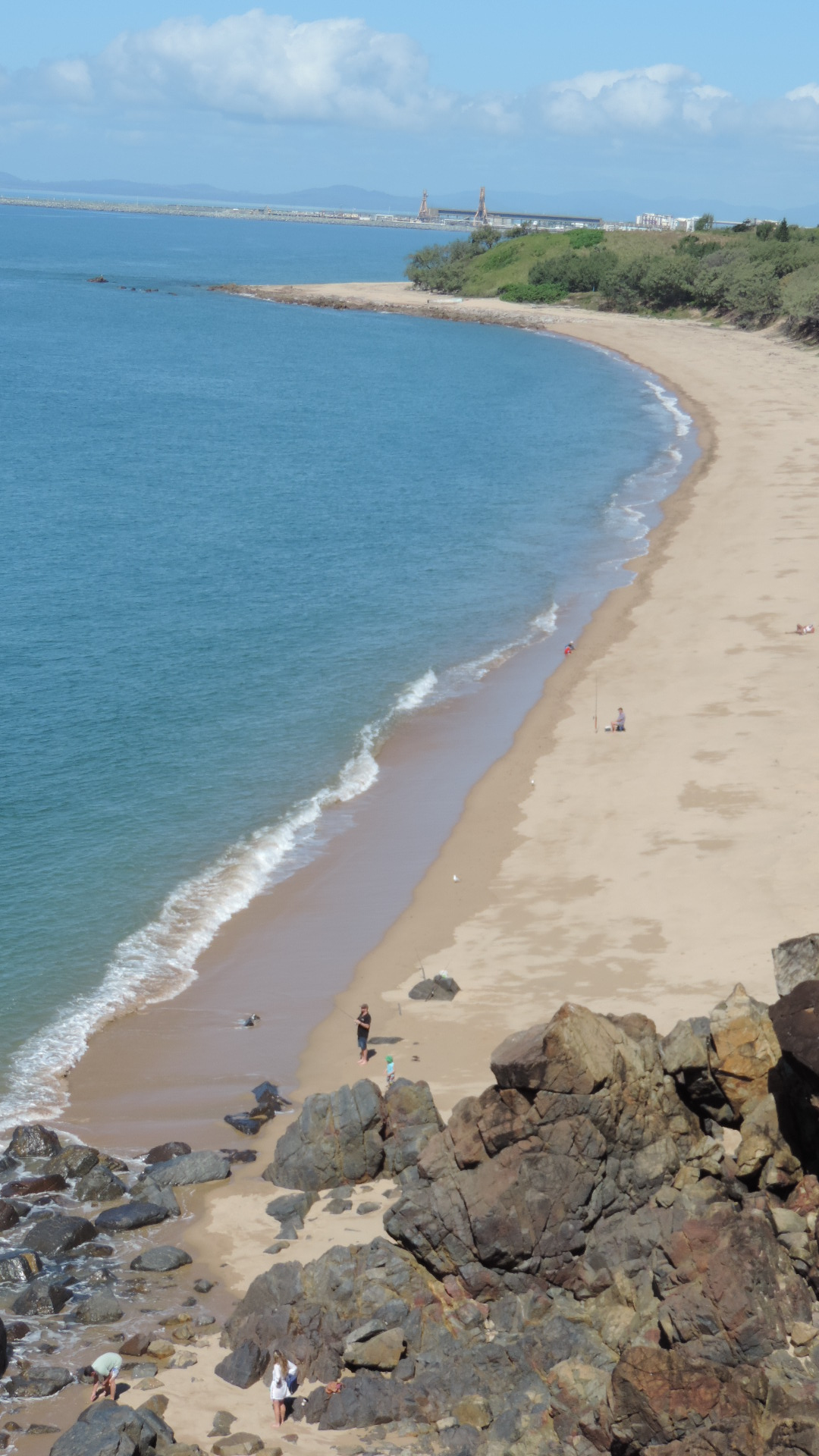
Looking south from Lamberts Beach Lookout along Lamberts Beach, 2016

The waters and inlets of the Coral Sea form the northern boundary and most of the eastern.

Slade Point has the following coastal features:

- Slade Bay (21.0689°S 149.2112°E)
- Slade Point (21.0639°S 149.2250°E)
- Lamberts Beach (21.0753°S 149.2282°E)

== History ==
The first British people to visit the area were the crew and passengers aboard the ketch Presto which pulled into the bay at Slade Point in June 1862 after having difficulty entering the Pioneer River. A crew member was killed by Aboriginal people, while Mr Roberts, a passenger, was either killed or taken away by Aboriginal people. Armed crew-members formed a search party but were unable to locate Roberts. Another larger search party, assisted by troopers of the Native Police, was later organised but no trace of Roberts was found.

Originally, the town was called Amhurst but it was renamed on 1 January 1967 to be Slade Point, named after the prominent headland of the same name which was named in June 1770 by Lieutenant James Cook of HMS Endeavour, after Thomas Slade, Surveyor of the Royal Navy and designer of Horatio Nelson's ship HMS Victory.

Amhurst State School opened on 11 April 1939. It was renamed Slade Point State School in 1967.

Around 1975, a Catholic church opened at 8 Finch Street (21.0787°S 149.2148°E). It has subsequently closed and has been converted into a residence, but the cross at the western end of the building remains intact.

It is the birthplace of Cathy Freeman. A recreation area where she raced as a child is now named after her.

== Demographics ==
In the 2016 census, the suburb of Slade Point had a population of 3,349 people.

In the 2021 census, the suburb of Slade Point had a population of 3,450 people.

== Education ==
Slade Point State School is a government primary (Prep-6) school for boys and girls at 362 Slade Point Road (21.0739°S 149.2147°E). In 2017, the school had an enrolment of 110 students with 13 teacher (11 full-time equivalent) and 11 non-teaching staff (8 full-time equivalent). In 2018, the school had an enrolment of 204 students with 13 teachers (12 full-time equivalent) and 16 non-teaching staff (10 full-time equivalent).

There is no secondary school in Slade Point. The nearest government secondary school is Pioneer State High School in neighbouring Andergrove to the south-west.

== Amenities ==
Slade Point Central shopping centre (formerly Seagull Shopping Centre) is at 1-7 Finch Street (21.0793°S 149.2145°E). Slade Point Post Office is in this centre (21.0793°S 149.2150°E).

The Mackay Regional Council operates a mobile library service on a fortnightly schedule at Pheasant Street.

Slade Point Community Hall is at 4 Wren Street (21.0759°S 149.2189°E).

Mackay RSL Memorial Bowls Club (also known as Slade Point Bowls Club) is at 30 Wren Street (21.0731°S 149.2190°E).

Life Giving Church (formerly Slade Point Christian Life Centre) is at 34 Robin Street (21.0764°S 149.2177°E). It is affiliated with Australian Christian Churches.

== Attractions ==
Lamberts Beach Lookout is off the Pacific Esplanade (21.0711°S 149.2288°E). It offers coastal views and view of passing whales (during the migration season).

The Slade Point water tower has been used to create a mural by Scott Nagy and Cara Sanders, which depicts the whale migration and the local red-tailed black cockatoos seen on the esplanade. It is at 1 Albatross Street (21.0669°S 149.2256°E).
