= Andergrove, Queensland =

Andergrove
- Suburb
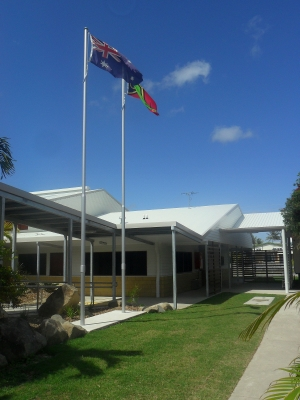
- Andergrove State School, 2011

- Interactive map of Andergrove
- Coordinates: 21.0930°S 149.1855°E
- Country: Australia
- State: Queensland
- City: Mackay
- LGA: Mackay Region
- Location: 6.8 km (4.2 mi) N of Mackay CBD; 992 km (616 mi) NNW of Brisbane

Government
  - State electorate: Mackay
  - Federal division: Dawson

Area
  - Total: 8.5 km^{2} (3.3 sq mi)

Population
  - Total: 9,924 (2021 census)
  - Density: 1,168/km^{2} (3,024/sq mi)
- Time zone: UTC+10:00 (AEST)
- Postcode: 4740
Suburbs around Andergrove
Blacks Beach	Blacks Beach	Slade Point
Beaconsfield	Andergrove	Mackay Harbour
Mount Pleasant	North Mackay	North Mackay

Andergrove is a northern urban locality in Mackay in the Mackay Region, Queensland, Australia. In the 2021 census, Andergrove had a population of 9,924 people.

== Geography ==
Andergrove has been steadily growing as a suburban community since 1990s and the housing stock is mostly low-set brick homes.

== History ==
Andergrove State School opened on 21 February 1939.

Pioneer State High School opened on 28 January 1986. At that time, Andergrove was in the Pioneer Shire, which was amalgamated into City of Mackay in 1994.

MacKillop Catholic Primary School opened in 1995.

== Demographics ==
In the 2011 census, Andergove had a population of 9,372 people.

In the 2016 census, Andergrove had a population of 9,419 people.

In the 2021 census, Andergrove had a population of 9,924 people.

== Education ==
Andergrove State School is a government primary (Prep–6) school for boys and girls at Fernleigh Avenue (21.0862°S 149.1882°E). In 2017, the school had an enrolment of 368 students with 35 teachers (27 full-time equivalent) and 22 non-teaching staff (14 full-time equivalent). It includes a special education program.

MacKillop Catholic Primary School is a Catholic primary (Prep–6) school for boys and girls at 20 Nadarmi Drive (21.0811°S 149.1855°E). In 2017, the school had an enrolment of 234 students with 17 teachers (15 full-time equivalent) and 13 non-teaching staff (8 full-time equivalent).

Pioneer State High School is a government secondary (7–12) school for boys and girls at 221 Bedford Road Bedford Road (21.0958°S 149.1806°E). In 2017, the school had an enrolment of 560 students with 56 teachers (51 full-time equivalent) and 34 non-teaching staff (27 full-time equivalent). It includes a special education program.

== Amenities ==
Northside Mackay Uniting Church is at 244–246 Bedford Road (21.0921°S 149.1817°E).

Mackay Church of Christ is at 65 Beaconsfield Rd East (21.1093°S 149.1739°E).
