= Bucasia, Queensland =

Bucasia
- Town
- Interactive map of Bucasia
- Coordinates: 21.0312°S 149.1599°E
- Country: Australia
- State: Queensland
- City: Mackay
- LGA: Mackay Region
- Location: 14.9 km (9.3 mi) N of Mackay CBD; 391 km (243 mi) SE of Townsville; 968 km (601 mi) NNW of Brisbane

Government
  - State electorate: Whitsunday
  - Federal division: Dawson

Area
  - Total: 10.5 km^{2} (4.1 sq mi)

Population
  - Total: 4,915 (2021 census)
  - Density: 468.1/km^{2} (1,212/sq mi)
- Time zone: UTC+10:00 (AEST)
- Postcode: 4750
Localities around Bucasia
| Habana | Shoal Point | Coral Sea |
| Habana | Bucasia | Coral Sea |
| Nindaroo | Rural View | Eimeo |

Bucasia is a coastal town and suburb of Mackay in the Mackay Region, Queensland, Australia. In the 2021 census, the suburb of Bucasia had a population of 4,915 people. In 2024, Bucasia was ranked as one of the most affordable beachside suburbs in Queensland by PropTrack.

== Geography ==
Bucasia is a northern coastal suburb of Mackay. The coastline forms its eastern boundary. Eimeo Creek forms the south-east boundary. The largest residential area is along the sandy beachfront with a second residential area along the road to Mackay. The bulk of the locality is used for growing sugarcane and tropical fruit, while some of the locality (particularly surrounding the creeks) is left as swampy wetlands.

The beach has a northerly aspect with views to the Cumberland Islands. It is protected from strong winds and is one of Mackay's most popular beaches. The beach is a nesting site for the flatback turtle with an average of 16 nests each year.

Offshore is Sunset Bay (21.0346°S 149.1709°E).

== History ==
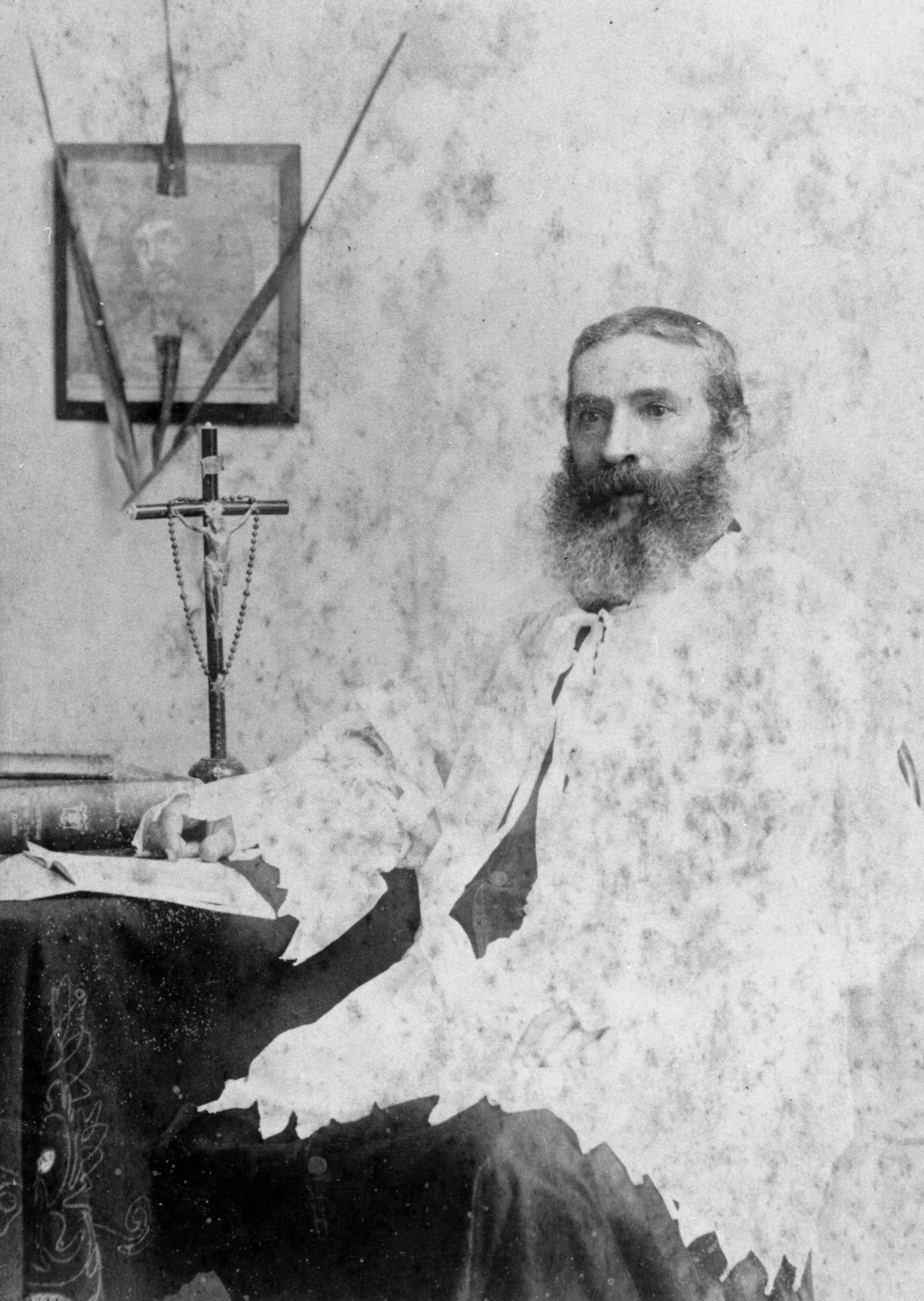
Father Pierre-Marie (Paul) Bucas

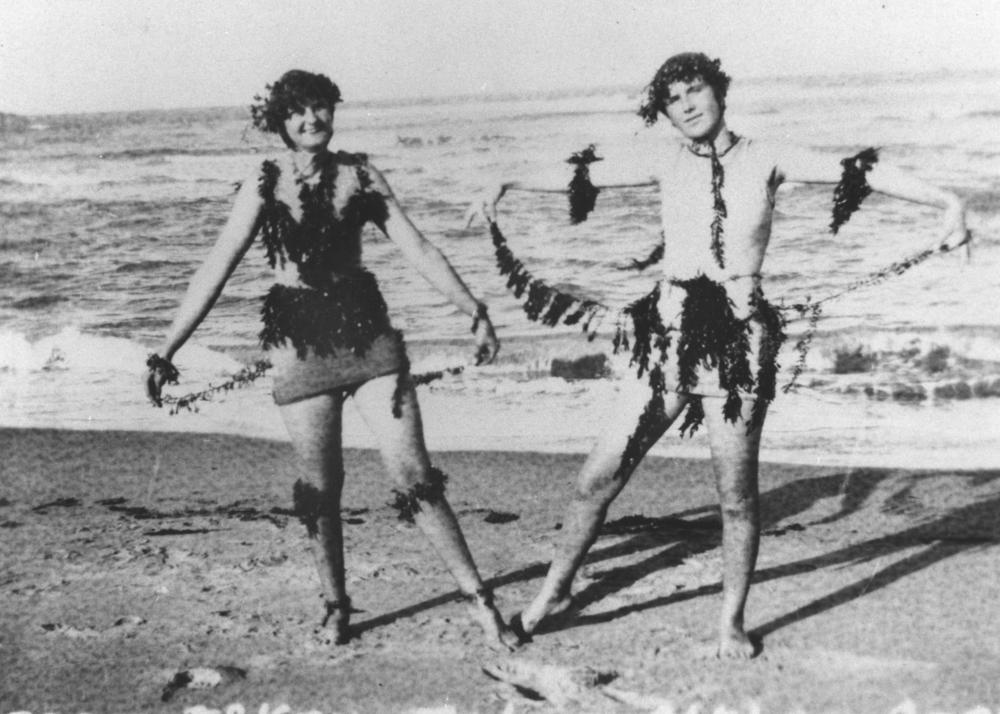
Holiday-makers on the beach in Bucasia, 1931

In 1874, Bucasia was originally called Marara but was later named Seaview. In 1938, it was decided that there were too many places called Seaview and so it was renamed Bucasia after Father Pierre-Marie (Paul) Bucas (born in 1840 in Saint-Jean-la-Poterie, Morbihan in France), the first Roman Catholic priest in Mackay.

Starting in 1874, Father Bucas acquired 1,680 acres (680 ha) of land through a series of purchases in present-day Bucasia, which he used to establish a community for displaced Aborigines. He also established the St Joseph's orphanage, operated by the Sisters of St Joseph until 1880, after which it was run by the Sisters of Mercy. In 1884, concerns about malaria resulted in the orphans being relocated in 1885 to the Meteor Park orphanage near Rockhampton (later known as Neerkol). The swamp in the west of the Bucasia locality is still known as Orphanage Swamp (21.0333°S 149.1333°E).

Over time, Bucasia developed as a holiday area but has now become a permanent residential area.

Bucasia State School opened on 29 January 1985.

On Sunday 2 October 1988, a monument to commemorate Bucas and his orphanage was unveiled at Seaview Park in Bucasia Esplanade, Bucasia (21.0348°S 149.1654°E).

In 2008, the Mackay Regional Council constructed a waste water treatment plant in Bucasia, serving the northern suburbs. The two basin sequencing batch reactor can process up to 4 megalitres per day.

In 2015, illegal tree clearing occurred on Bucasia foreshore, a problem in many coastal communities where foreshore trees block residential views. The trees were planted to stabilise the dunes, protect the beach, and provide habitat for wildlife.

== Demographics ==
In the 2011 census, the suburb of Bucasia had a population of 4,257 people.

In the 2016 census, the suburb of Bucasia had a population of 4,771 people.

In the 2021 census, the suburb of Bucasia had a population of 4,915 people.

== Education ==
Bucasia State School is a government primary (Prep-6) school for boys and girls at 76 Kemp Street (21.0309°S 149.1578°E). In 2014, the school had 329 students with 20 teachers (19 equivalent full-time). In 2018, the school had an enrolment of 393 students with 23 teachers (21 full-time equivalent) and 18 non-teaching staff (12 full-time equivalent).

There is no secondary school in Bucasia. The nearest government secondary school is Mackay Northern Beaches State High School in neighbouring Rural View to the south.

== Amenities ==
The Mackay Regional Council operates a mobile library service on a fortnightly schedule on the Esplanade near Steen Avenue.

There are a number of parks in the suburb, including:

- Admiralty Way (21.0223°S 149.1500°E)
- Bezzina Court Park (21.0391°S 149.1597°E)
- Bezzina Court Reserve Park (21.0386°S 149.1569°E)
- Dolphins Park (21.0356°S 149.1471°E)
- Fisher Street Park (21.0253°S 149.1564°E)
- Griffin Avenue Park (21.0221°S 149.1555°E)
- Hennessy Street Park (21.0382°S 149.1552°E)
- Michelle Crescent Park (21.0397°S 149.1655°E)
- Royal Sands Park (21.0234°S 149.1532°E)
