= Beaconsfield, Queensland =

Beaconsfield
- Suburb
- Interactive map of Beaconsfield
- Coordinates: 21.0888°S 149.1669°E
- Country: Australia
- State: Queensland
- City: Mackay
- LGA: Mackay Region
- Location: 8.0 km (5.0 mi) N of Mackay CBD; 961 km (597 mi) NNW of Brisbane

Government
  - State electorates: Mackay; Whitsunday
  - Federal division: Dawson

Area
  - Total: 6.3 km^{2} (2.4 sq mi)

Population
  - Total: 5,899 (2021 census)
  - Density: 936/km^{2} (2,425/sq mi)
- Time zone: UTC+10:00 (AEST)
- Postcode: 4740
Suburbs around Beaconsfield
Rural View	Rural View	Blacks Beach
Richmond	Beaconsfield	Andergrove
Mount Pleasant	Mount Pleasant	North Mackay

Beaconsfield is a suburb of Mackay in the Mackay Region, Queensland, Australia. In the 2021 census, Beaconsfield had a population of 5,899 people.

== Geography ==
Beaconsfield is located 8 kilometres (5.0 mi) north of the Mackay CBD.

== History ==
The suburb was named after the Beaconsfield sugar plantation. It had a sugar crushing mill from about 1882 to 1893.

Mackay Wanderers Soccer Club was established in 1923.

In 1928, the Mackay Golf Club established a 9-hole course and club house in Beaconsfield on a 122-acre (49 ha) leased site. A further 43 acres (17 ha) were purchased in 1939, but due to World War II it was not until 1947 that a further 9 holes were established on this land. A new club house was built in 1967. In 1981 the club constructed an on-site dam for irrigation with a second dam built in 1999. In 1985 the club changed its constitution to allow women to have full membership rights. Prior to coming to Beaconsfield, the club established a 9-hole golf course on the Mackay town common (later Mackay Airport) in 1925 with its first club house built in 1926 which was subsequently relocated to Beaconsfield.

Carlisle Adventist Christian College opened in 1951 in the church hall of the Central Mackay Church in Milton Street in Mackay with an enrolment of 22 students. Initially, it was only a primary school, but later expanded into secondary schooling. In 2006, the school relocated to its present on Holts Road in Beaconsfield. In 2018–2019, the school introduced Years 11 and 12 schooling.

Kewarra State Special School opened on 21 February 1987. The school had been previously operated by the Endeavour Foundation. On 10 August 2002, it was renamed Mackay District Special School.

Whitsunday Anglican School opened on 27 January 1988.

Beaconsfield State School opened on 1 January 1999.

== Demographics ==
In the 2016 census, Beaconsfield had a population of 5,490 people.

In the 2021 census, Beaconsfield had a population of 5,899 people.

== Education ==
Beaconsfield State School is a government primary (Prep–6) school for boys and girls at Nadina Street (21.0933°S 149.1713°E). In 2018, the school had an enrolment of 343 students with 27 teachers (23 full-time equivalent) and 33 non-teaching staff (22 full-time equivalent). It includes a special education program. The C&K Beaconsfield Community Kindergarten is on-site at the Beaconsfield State School.

Carlisle Adventist Christian College is a private primary and secondary (Prep–12) school for boys and girls at 17 Holts Road (21.1006°S 149.1644°E). In 2018, the school had an enrolment of 206 students with 20 teachers (18 full-time equivalent) and 15 non-teaching staff (10 full-time equivalent).

Whitsunday Anglican School is a private primary and secondary (Prep–12) school for boys and girls at Celeber Drive (21.1026°S 149.1721°E). In 2018, the school had an enrolment of 649 students with 62 teachers (58 full-time equivalent) and 34 non-teaching staff (31 full-time equivalent).

Mackay District Special School is a special primary and secondary (Prep–12) school for boys and girls at 63 Mansfield Drive (21.0947°S 149.1706°E). It is available for students with a diverse range of abilities and special education requirements. In 2018, the school had an enrolment of 94 students with 23 teachers (22 full-time equivalent) and 29 non-teaching staff (21 full-time equivalent).

There is no government secondary school in Beaconsfield. The nearest government secondary schools are Pioneer State High School in neighbouring Andergrove to the east and Mackay North State High School in neighbouring North Mackay to the south-east.

== Amenities ==
Mackay Golf Club operates an 18-hole golf course on Mackay-Bucasia Road for members and the public (21.0869°S 149.1609°E).

Mackay Wanderers Soccer Club is at 17 Ben Nevis Street (21.0863°S 149.1710°E).

There are a number of parks in the suburb, including:

- Broomdykes Park (21.0860°S 149.1774°E)
- Eaglemount Park (21.0881°S 149.1715°E)
- Emperor Drive Park (21.0791°S 149.1804°E)
- Holmes Drive Park (21.1029°S 149.1660°E)
- Mansfield Drive Park (21.0986°S 149.1713°E)
