= Rural View, Queensland =

Rural View
- Suburb
- Interactive map of Rural View
- Coordinates: 21.0661°S 149.1597°E
- Country: Australia
- State: Queensland
- City: Mackay
- LGA: Mackay Region
- Location: 11.7 km (7.3 mi) N of Mackay; 345 km (214 mi) N of Rockhampton; 388 km (241 mi) SE of Townsville; 963 km (598 mi) NNW of Brisbane

Government
  - State electorate: Whitsunday
  - Federal division: Dawson

Area
  - Total: 8.8 km^{2} (3.4 sq mi)

Population
  - Total: 5,657 (2021 census)
  - Density: 643/km^{2} (1,665/sq mi)
- Time zone: UTC+10:00 (AEST)
- Postcode: 4740
Suburbs around Rural View
Bucasia	Bucasia	Eimeo
Nindaroo	Rural View	Blacks Beach
Nindaroo	Richmond	Beaconsfield

Rural View is a suburb in the Mackay Region, Queensland, Australia. In the 2021 census, Rural View had a population of 5,657 people.

== Geography ==
Rural View is 11.7 kilometres (7.3 mi) by road north of the Mackay CBD.

== History ==
Eimeo Road State School opened on 5 February 1934.

Rural View was officially named and bounded in September 1999.

Mackay Northern Beaches State High School opened on 1 January 2013.

St Brendan's Catholic Primary School opened in 2015.

== Demographics ==
In the 2011 census, Rural View had a population of 3,324 people.

In the 2016 census, Rural View had a population of 4,793 people.

In the 2021 census, Rural View had a population of 5,657 people.

== Education ==
Eimeo Road State School is a government primary (Prep–6) school for boys and girls at 21 Eimeo Road (21.0593°S 149.1616°E). In 2014, the student enrolment was 942 with 61 teachers (52 full-time equivalent). In 2018, the school had an enrolment of 980 students with 72 teachers (66 full-time equivalent) and 35 non-teaching staff (23 full-time equivalent). It includes a special education program.

St Brendan's Catholic Primary School is a private primary (Prep–6) school at 799 Mackay-Bucasia Road (21.0527°S 149.1608°E).

Mackay Northern Beaches State High School is a government secondary (7–12) school for boys and girls at 30 Rosewood Drive (21.0670°S 149.1616°E). In 2014, the student enrolment was 390 with 37 teachers (35 equivalent full-time). In 2018, the school had an enrolment of 930 students with 74 teachers (71 full-time equivalent) and 43 non-teaching staff (31 full-time equivalent). It includes a special education program.
