= Mackay North State High School =

Secondary school in Mackay, Queensland

Coordinates: 21°06′54″S 149°10′23″E

- Mackay, Queensland; Australia

Information
- Type: Public
- Motto: We strive for the best
- Established: 1964
- Principal: Catherine Rolfe
- Enrolment: 1,359 (2023)
- Website: https://mackaynorthshs.eq.edu.au/

Mackay North State High School is a public, co-educational, high school, located in the suburb of North Mackay, within the Mackay region, in Queensland, Australia. It is administered by the Department of Education, with an enrolment of 1,359 students and a teaching staff of 112, as of 2023. The school serves students from Year 7 to Year 12.

== History ==
The school opened on 28 January 1964, with an enrolment of 209 students in Years 8 and 9. Mr. JD Cassidy was the first principal with a staff of nine teachers.

The schools opening was made official on 23 September 1967, when Minister for Mines and main Roads, Hon. R E Camm, opened the school.

In 1972, student Marilyn Joy Wallman went missing on her way to school.

== Facilities ==
The schools Facilities include:

- First Year Centre
- Community Hall and swimming pool
- Senior Centre
- 200 seat Auditorium
- Catering Kitchen
- Shaded Terrace Seating
- Specialized Modern Art, Music, Home Economics, Manual Arts and Performing Arts Blocks
- 15 Computer Laboratories
- Basketball, Cricket and Athletics facilities

== Notable alumni ==
- Benita Willis - Australian representative to the 2012 Olympics in Athletics.
