= Greenmount =

Greenmount may refer to:

Australia

- Greenmount Beach, a headland on the Gold Coast of Queensland
- Greenmount, Queensland (Mackay Region), a rural locality in Central Queensland
  - Greenmount Homestead, a heritage-listed homestead in Queensland
- Greenmount, Queensland (Toowoomba Region), a rural town on the Darling Downs, Queensland
  - Greenmount War Memorial, a heritage-listed war memorial in Greenmount
- Greenmount, Western Australia, a suburb of Perth

Canada

- Greenmount, Prince Edward Island, community in Canada

Ireland

- Greenmount motte, ancient site in County Louth

New Zealand

- Greenmount, New Zealand, a suburb of Auckland
- Green Hill, New Zealand, a volcano in Auckland

United Kingdom

- Greenmount, Greater Manchester, village in England
- Greenmount Housing Estate, in Northern Ireland

United States

- Greenmount, Maryland, in Carroll County
- Greenmount, Baltimore, Maryland, a city neighborhood
- Green Mount Cemetery, in Baltimore, Maryland
- The GreenMount School, in Baltimore, Maryland
