= Pleystowe, Queensland =

Pleystowe
- Suburb
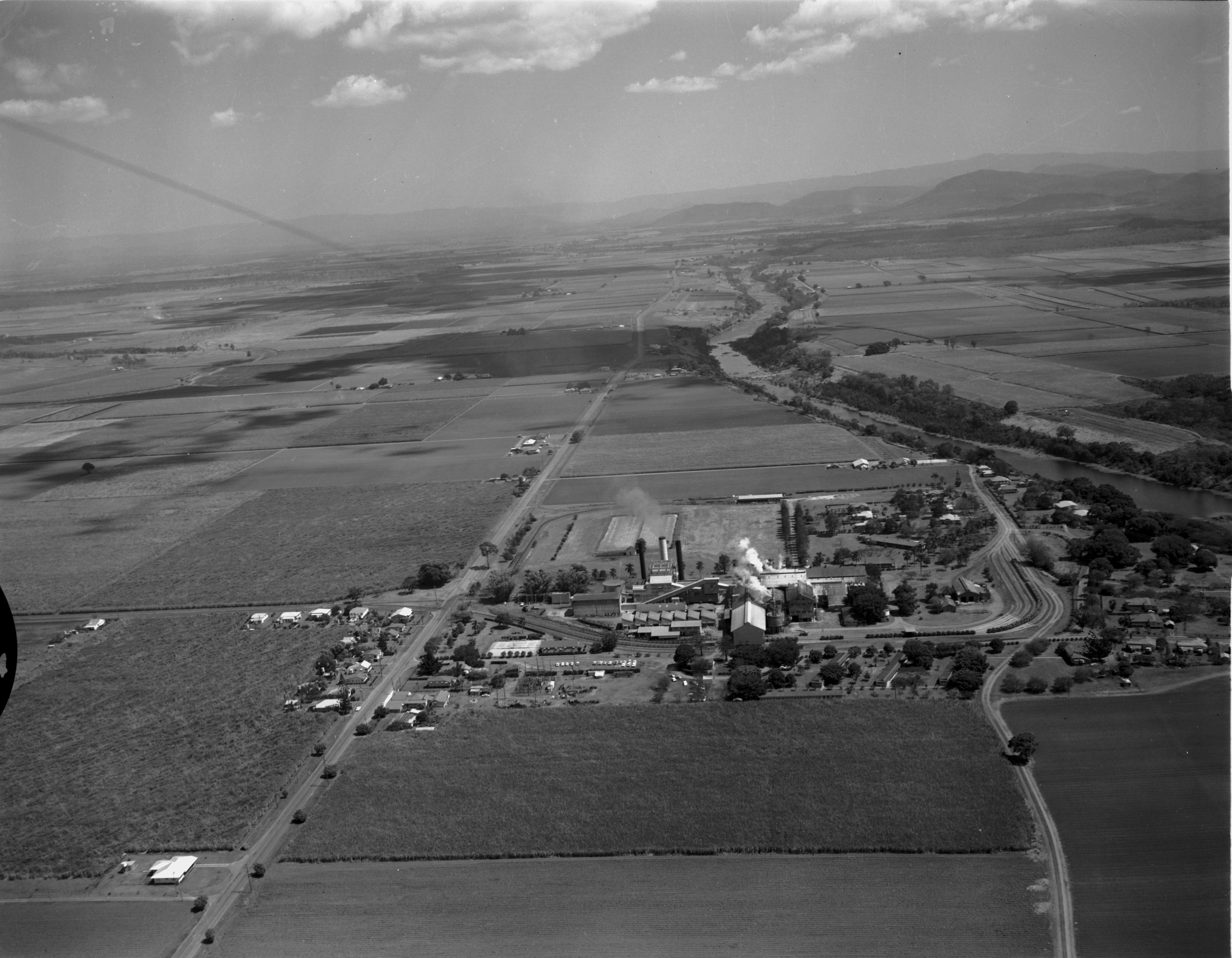
- Pleystowe Sugar Mill, circa 1967

- Interactive map of Pleystowe
- Coordinates: 21.1541°S 149.0186°E
- Country: Australia
- State: Queensland
- LGA: Mackay Region
- Location: 16.2 km (10.1 mi) E of Mirani; 20.7 km (12.9 mi) W of Mackay CBD; 981 km (610 mi) NNW of Brisbane

Government
  - State electorate: Mirani
  - Federal division: Capricornia

Area
  - Total: 16.9 km^{2} (6.5 sq mi)

Population
  - Total: 418 (2021 census)
  - Density: 24.73/km^{2} (64.06/sq mi)
- Time zone: UTC+10:00 (AEST)
- Postcode: 4741
Suburbs around Pleystowe
Balnagowan	Balnagowan	Dumbleton
Marian	Pleystowe	Walkerston
Marian	Greenmount	Greenmount

Pleystowe is a rural locality in the Mackay Region, Queensland, Australia. It is known for the former Pleystowe Sugar Mill used to crush sugar cane to produce raw sugar. In the 2021 census, Pleystowe had a population of 418 people.

== Geography ==
The locality is bounded to the north by the Pioneer River.

Mackay - Eungella Road runs through the north of the locality loosely parallel to the river, entering the locality from the east (Walkerston) and exiting to the west (Marian). Pleystowe Connection Road commences at Mackay - Eungella Road and crosses the Pioneer River on the John Cook Bridge to Balnagowan to the north.

== History ==
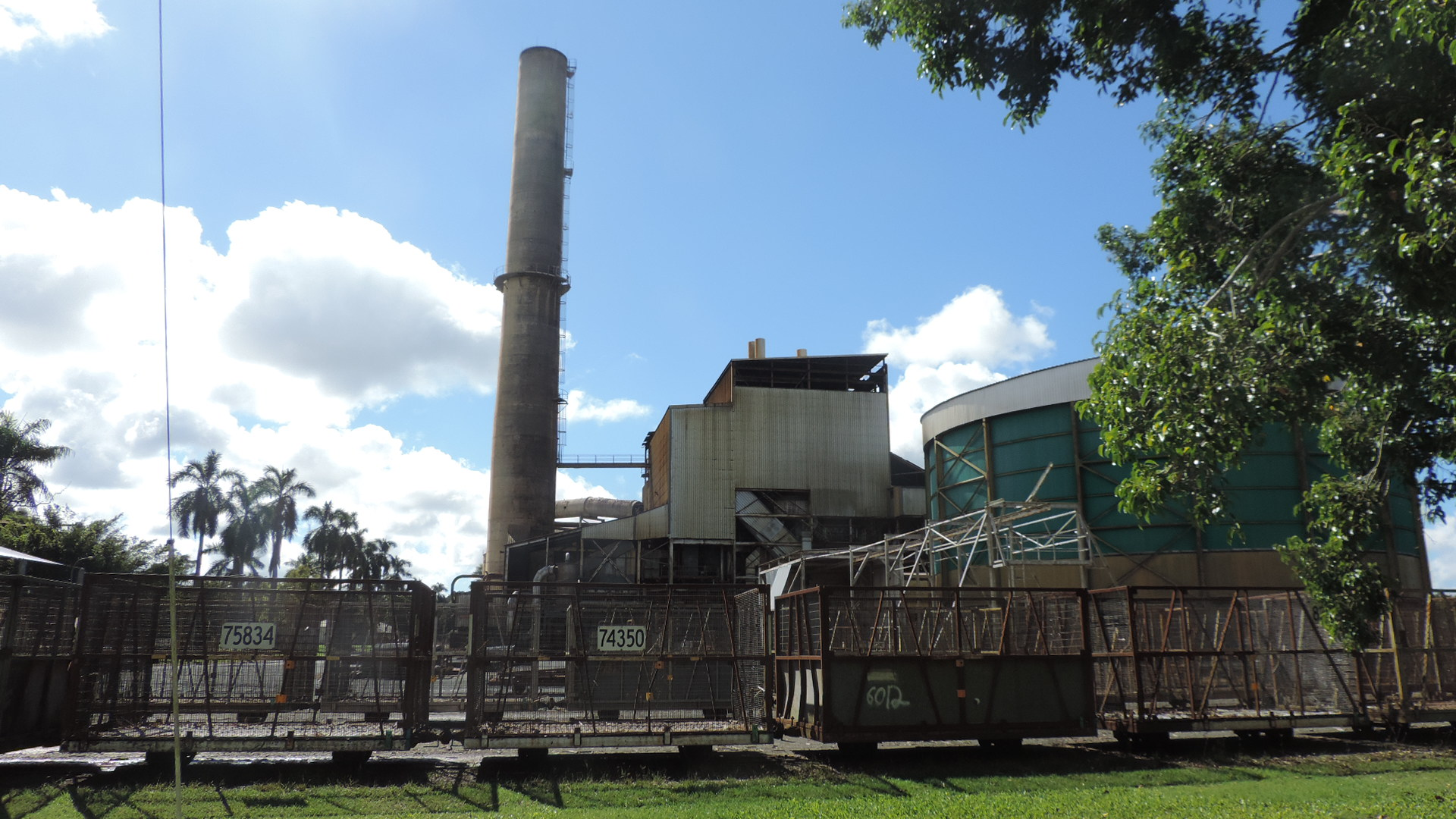
Pleystowe Sugar Mill, 2016

The Pleystowe Sugar Plantation was established in 1869. The Pleystowe sugar mill was built in 1870-71 producing it its first sugar in 1872. It became part of CSR Limited in 1975. In 1988, it was bought by the Mackay Sugar Co-operative Association. The mill was closed in 2009 and in 2021 the mill was demolished apart from the original stack. It was at 598-640 Mackay Eungella Road (21.1435°S 149.0387°E).

Built in 1885, the first section of the Pioneer Valley railway line came west from Mackay via Pleystowe to Mirani (then known as Hamilton) and then south to Eton. The final section of the line from Paget Junction to Marian (through Pleystowe) closed in 2009. The line had the following stations (now dismantled) servicing the locality (from west to east):

- Wollingford railway station (21.1508°S 148.9969°E)
- Greenknoll railway station (21.1515°S 149.0181°E)
- Pleystowe railway station (21.1553°S 149.0374°E)

Pleystowe Provisional School opened on 15 April 1896 on a 3-acre (1.2 ha) site on the Green Nob. The site was described as "a most imposing one for a school and the view from the crest of the Nob and the exhilarating breeze one gets on reaching it well repays for the little climb". In 1903, it was proposed to relocate the school, but there was criticism of the new location and the motivations behind the proposal. It became Pleystowe State School on 1 January 1909, although by July 1909, it was criticised for having an average daily attendance of only 11.7 students. In 1914, it was decided to relocate and enlarge the school. It closed in 1961. The school was on the south-western corner of the Mackay-Eungella Road and Pleystowe School Road (approx 21.14340°S 149.02604°E).

== Demographics ==
In the 2016 census, Pleystowe had a population of 371 people.

In the 2021 census, Pleystowe had a population of 418 people.

== Education ==
There are no schools in Pleystowe. The nearest government primary schools are Walkerston State School in neighbouring Walkerston to the east and Marian State School in neighbouring Marian to the west. The nearest government secondary schools are Mackay State High School in South Mackay to the east and Mirani State High School in Mirani to the west.

== Amenities ==
There is a boat ramp and pontoon on the Pioneer Boat Ramp Access Road off the Pleystowe Connection Road into the Pioneer River (21.1420°S 149.0266°E). It is managed by the Mackay Regional Council.

== See also ==
- List of tramways in Queensland
