= Victoria Plains, Queensland =

Victoria Plains
- Suburb
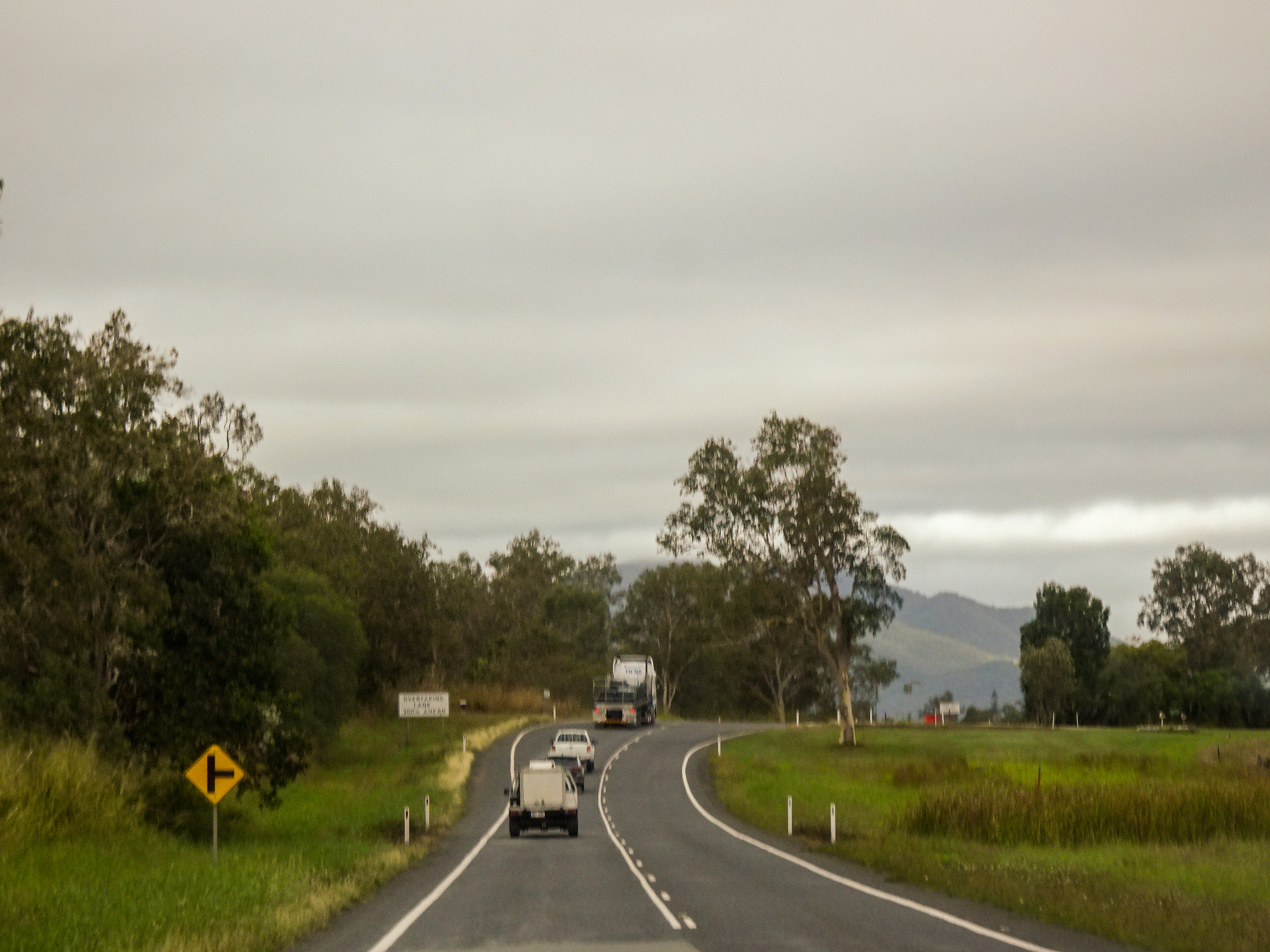
- Peak Downs Highway, Victoria Plains, 2024

- Interactive map of Victoria Plains
- Coordinates: 21.22°S 149.0166°E
- Country: Australia
- State: Queensland
- LGA: Mackay Region
- Location: 21.5 km (13.4 mi) WSW of Mackay CBD; 24.8 km (15.4 mi) ESE of Mirani; 987 km (613 mi) NNW of Brisbane

Government
  - State electorate: Mirani
  - Federal division: Capricornia

Area
  - Total: 42.9 km^{2} (16.6 sq mi)

Population
  - Total: 338 (2021 census)
  - Density: 7.879/km^{2} (20.41/sq mi)
- Time zone: UTC+10:00 (AEST)
- Postcode: 4751
Suburbs around Victoria Plains
Marian	Greenmount	Greenmount
North Eton	Victoria Plains	Palmyra
Eton	Homebush	Homebush

Victoria Plains is a rural locality in the Mackay Region, Queensland, Australia. In the 2021 census, Victoria Plains had a population of 338 people.

== Geography ==
Victoria Plains has the following mountains:

- Dals Lookout in the north-east of the locality (21.2108°S 149.0201°E), rising to 147 metres (482 ft) above sea level
- Gins Leap in the north-west of the locality (21.2057°S 148.9894°E), rising to 45 metres (148 ft)

The Peak Downs Highway enters the locality from the north-west (Greenmount) and exits to the south-west (Eton).

The land use is predominantly growing sugarcane in the north and west of the locality with a cane tramway to transport the harvested sugarcane to the local sugar mill. In the south and east of the locality, the land use is mostly grazing on native vegetation . There is some rural residential housing in the centre and north-east of the locality.

== History ==
The Mt Vince Rifle Range was established in the 1950s by the Australian Department of Defence which encouraged local rifle clubs to make use of the facility to improve the shooting skills of citizens in case there should be another war. The range closed in 2017 when the Defence Department decided to sell off the land as surplus to its needs and to avoid further maintenance costs. Following protests by North Queensland shooters, the Defence Department agreed to sell the rifle range to the Mackay Regional Council for a token payment of $1 so that it would remain a community facility. It reopened in February 2020.

== Demographics ==
In the 2016 census, Victoria Plains had a population of 364 people.

In the 2021 census, Victoria Plains had a population of 338 people.

== Education ==
There are no schools in Victoria Plains. The nearest government primary schools are:

- Eton State School in neighbouring Eton to the south-west
- North Eton State School in neighbouring North Eton to the west
- Marian State School in neighbouring Marian to the north-west
- Walkerston State School in Walkerston to the north-east

The nearest government secondary schools are Mackay State High School in South Mackay to the north-east and Mirani State High School in Mirani to the north-west.

== Amenities ==
Mt Vince Rifle Range is at 659 Victoria Plains Road (21.1846°S 148.9999°E). It is used by the Mt Vince Rifle Range Club and is open to the public for training, practice, and competitions. It is operated by the Mackay Regional Council.

== Facilities ==
Victoria Plains pumping station is in the south-west of the locality, off the Peak Downs Highway (21.2409°S 149.0016°E). Operated by SunWater, it is part of the Eton Irrigation Scheme which delivers water to farms in the Eton area. It is supplied with water from the Kinchant Dam. The Victoria Plains pumping station is capable of pumping up to 82 megalitres (2.9×10^{6} cu ft) each day, operating in conjunction with the Victoria Plains Balancing Storage with a capacity of 25 megalitres (880×10^{3} cu ft).

== Attractions ==
Dals Lookout is accessible from Austin Road, off the Peak Downs Highway (21.2108°S 149.0192°E).
