= Erakala, Queensland =

Erakala
- Suburb
- Interactive map of Erakala
- Coordinates: 21.1322°S 149.1155°E
- Country: Australia
- State: Queensland
- LGA: Mackay Region
- Location: 9.4 km (5.8 mi) W of North Mackay; 10.2 km (6.3 mi) WNW of Mackay CBD; 990 km (620 mi) NNW of Brisbane

Government
  - State electorate: Whitsunday
  - Federal division: Dawson

Area
  - Total: 12.4 km^{2} (4.8 sq mi)

Population
  - Total: 763 (2021 census)
  - Density: 61.53/km^{2} (159.4/sq mi)
- Time zone: UTC+10:00 (AEST)
- Postcode: 4740
Suburbs around Erakala
Farleigh	Farleigh	Glenella
Dumbleton	Erakala	Foulden
Alexandra	Te Kowai	Racecourse

Erakala is a mixed-use locality in the Mackay Region, Queensland, Australia. In the 2021 census, Erakala had a population of 763 people.

== Geography ==
Located approximately 10 kilometres (6.2 mi) west of the Mackay CBD, the locality is bounded to the south by the Pioneer River.

The Mackay Ring Road crosses the river from the south (Te Kowai / Racecourse) and is the south-eastern boundary of the locality before continuing north through the locality exiting to Glenella to the north-east.

The Bruce Highway forms two short segments of the locality's northern boundary entering from the north-east (Glenella) and exiting to the north-west (Farleigh).

The North Coast railway line enters the locality from the east (Foulden) heading north-west, forming part of the locality's north-eastern boundary before crossing the Bruce Highway and exiting to the north (Fairleigh / Glenella). The locality was historically served by the former Erakala railway station (21.1271°S 149.1334°E).

Most of the land in the south of the locality is low-lying (approx 10 metres (33 ft) above sea level), particularly the land near the river. This land is almost entirely used for growing sugarcane and there is a network of cane tramways to transported the harvested sugarcane to the local sugar mills.

The northern parts of the locality are more elevated, rising to 140 metres (460 ft). This land is increasingly used for rural residential and suburban housing.

== History ==
The locality takes its name from the former Erakala railway station, which in turn was named on 12 January 1927 by J. Strachan, the Mackay railway traffic manager of Queensland Railways Department. It is an Aboriginal word meaning "flat".

== Demographics ==
In the 2016 census, Erakala had a population of 547 people.

In the 2021 census, Erakala had a population of 763 people.

== Education ==
There are no schools in Erakala. The nearest government primary schools are Farleigh State School in neighbouring Farleigh to the north and Glenella State School in neighbouring Glenella to the north-east. The nearest government secondary school is Mackay North State High School in North Mackay to the north-east.
