= Palmyra, Queensland =

Palmyra
- Suburb
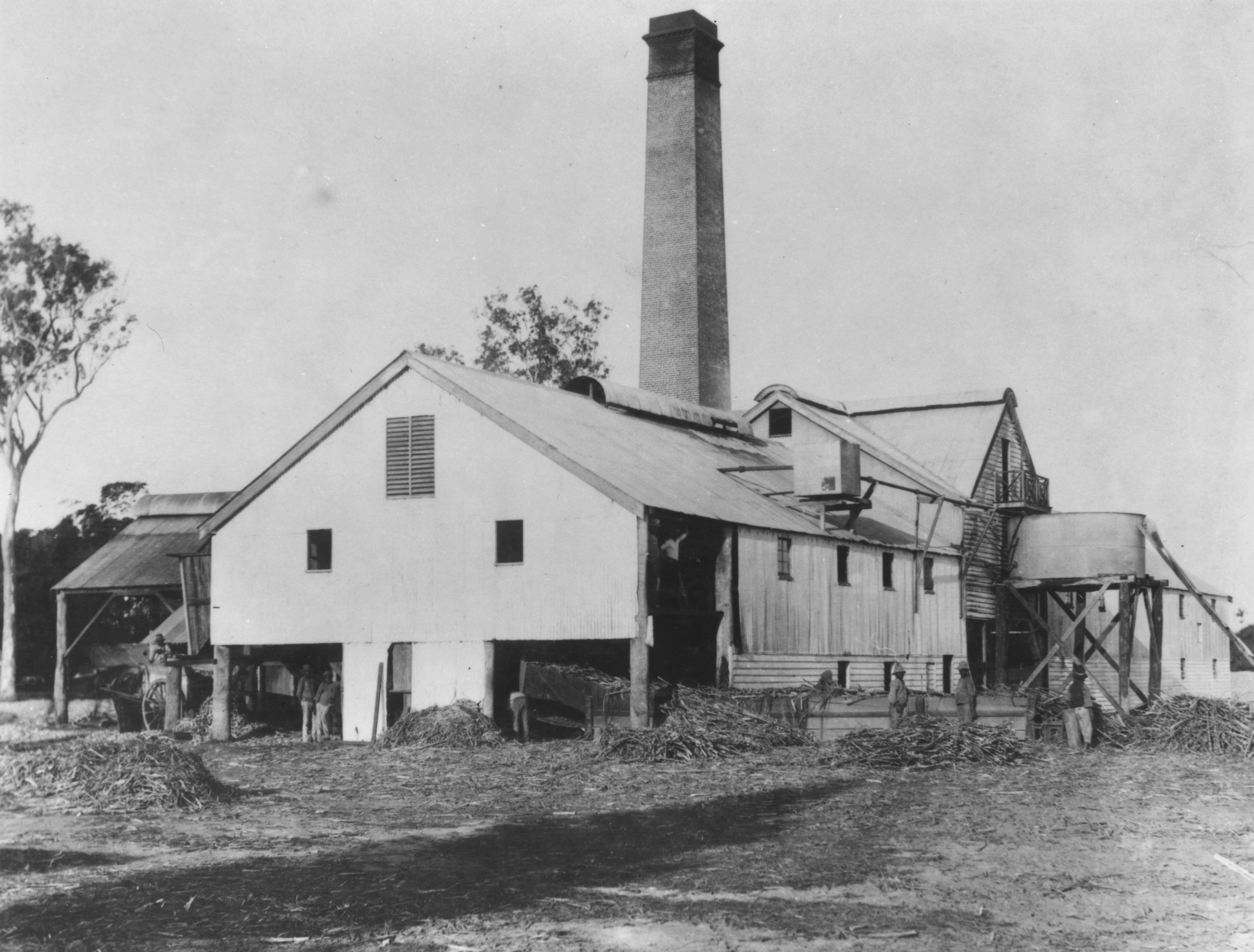
- Palmyra sugar mill, 1895

- Interactive map of Palmyra
- Coordinates: 21.2033°S 149.0830°E
- Country: Australia
- State: Queensland
- LGA: Mackay Region
- Location: 7.9 km (4.9 mi) S of Walkerston; 16.2 km (10.1 mi) SW of Mackay CBD; 969 km (602 mi) NNW of Brisbane

Government
  - State electorate: Mirani
  - Federal division: Capricornia

Area
  - Total: 34.7 km^{2} (13.4 sq mi)

Population
  - Total: 250 (2021 census)
  - Density: 7.20/km^{2} (18.7/sq mi)
- Time zone: UTC+10:00 (AEST)
- Postcode: 4751
Suburbs around Palmyra
Walkerston	Alexandra	Te Kowai
Greenmount	Palmyra	Te Kowai
Victoria Plains	Homebush	Sandiford

Palmyra is a rural locality in the Mackay Region, Queensland, Australia. In the 2021 census, Palmyra had a population of 250 people.

== Geography ==
The locality is bounded from north to east by Bakers Creek, which it is bounded from south to east by Maclennan Creek, which becomes a tributary of the Bakers Creek at the easternmost point of the locality, from where Bakers Creek flows eastwards through the locality of Bakers Creek to the Coral Sea.

The Walkerston Bypass enters the locality from the west (Greenmount) and exits to the north-west (Te Kowai).

The land use is predominantly growing sugarcane on the lower flatter land with grazing on native vegetation on the higher elevations, mostly in the south-west of the locality. There is a network of cane tramways to transport the harvested sugarcane to the local sugar mills.

== History ==
The Palmyra sugar mill operated from 1883 to 1905. It was north of Silingardis Road (appox 21.1769°S 149.0903°E).

Palmyra Dragway opened in 1968. The dragway was badly damaged by Cyclone Debbie in 2017. In 2023, the dragway was approved by the International Hot Rod Assoc Australia (IHRA).

Mac's Speedway began hosting motorsport events in the 1980s. It takes its name from the McNicholl family and the track has hosted important motorcycle speedway events, including the final of the Queensland Solo Championship, which was a qualifying round of the Speedway World Championship in 1991. In April 2024, the site at 13 Grants Road (21.2075°S 149.0720°E) was put up for sale.

== Demographics ==
In the 2016 census, Palmyra had a population of 264 people.

In the 2021 census, Palmyra had a population of 250 people.

== Education ==
There are no schools in Palmyra. The nearest government primary schools are Walkerston State School in neighbouring Walkerston to the north-west, Dundula State School in Bakers Creek to the east, and Homebush State School in neighbouring Homebush to the south. The nearest government secondary school is Mackay State High School in South Mackay to the north-east. There are also non-government schools in Walkerston and in Mackay's suburbs.

== Amenities ==
The locality has a number of motor sport venues, which include:

- Palmyra Drag Racing Club, 29 Bells Road (21.2045°S 149.0770°E)
- Mackay and District Kart Club, 21 Grants Road (21.2047°S 149.0728°E)

The dragway shares its site with the private Palmyra Airstrip which is used for recreational flying.
