= Farleigh, Queensland =

Farleigh
- Town
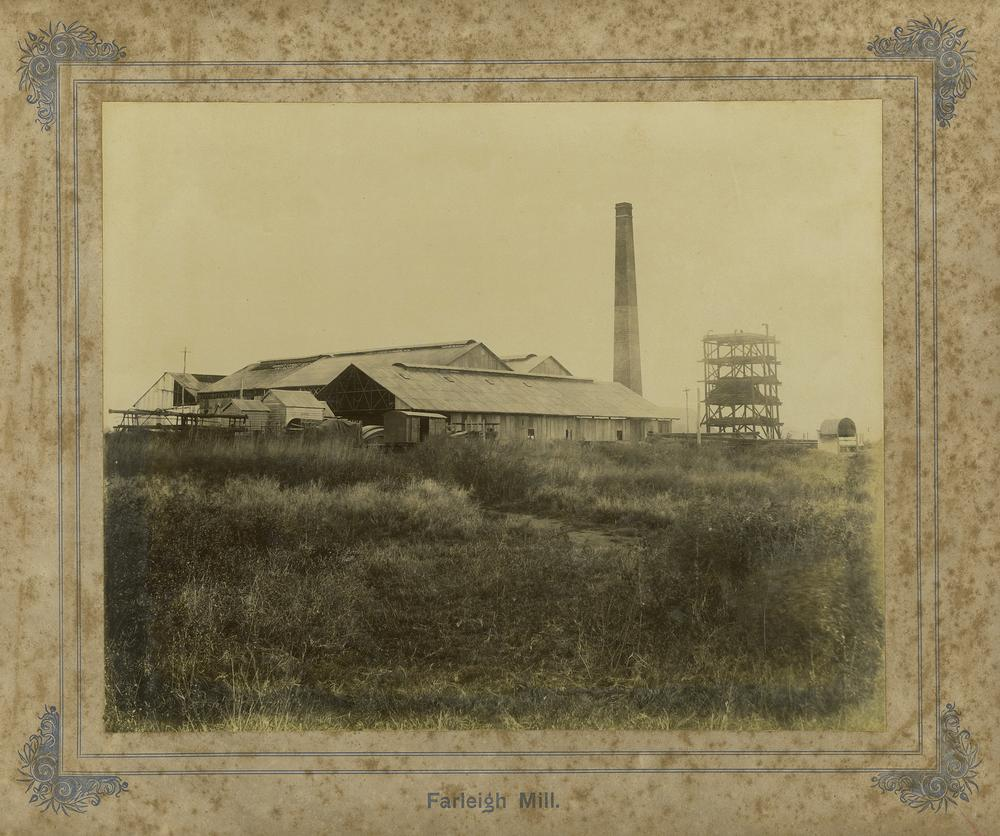
- Farleigh Sugar Mill, circa 1895

- Interactive map of Farleigh
- Coordinates: 21.1061°S 149.1030°E
- Country: Australia
- State: Queensland
- LGA: Mackay Region
- Location: 12.1 km (7.5 mi) NW of Mackay CBD; 981 km (610 mi) NNW of Brisbane

Government
  - State electorate: Whitsunday
  - Federal division: Dawson

Area
  - Total: 28.9 km^{2} (11.2 sq mi)

Population
  - Total: 814 (2021 census)
  - Density: 28.17/km^{2} (72.95/sq mi)
- Time zone: UTC+10:00 (AEST)
- Postcode: 4741
Localities around Farleigh
The Leap	Habana	Nindaroo
The Leap	Farleigh	Richmond; Glenella
Balnagowan	Dumbleton	Erakala

Farleigh is a rural town and locality in the Mackay Region, Queensland, Australia. In the 2021 census, the locality of Farleigh had a population of 814 people.

== Geography ==
The town is located in the south-east of the locality. The Bruce Highway traverses the locality from the south-east to the west, passing through the town. The North Coast railway line also passes through the locality from the south-east to the west but further north and east than the highway. The Farleigh railway station is located beside the Farleigh sugar mill which has an associated sugarcane tramway network.

The land in the locality is mostly flat at 30–40 metres above sea level. It is freehold land used for cropping, principally sugarcane.

== History ==
Farleigh Mill was built in 1883 by Sir John Bennett Laws. For the first years, the mill had an associated sugar plantation. In 1900 the mill was sold to Farleigh Estate Sugar Co Ltd in 1900 and developed so that it could replace a number of the local mills: Ashburton, The Cedars, Coningsby, Pioneer, Richmond, Nindaroo, Habana and Dumbleton. In 1921 the CSR Company discontinued operations at the nearby Homebush Mill and the Farleigh Mill took over their crushing. After Farleigh Estate Sugar Co Ltd went bankrupt in 1926, the mill was purchased by a co-operative of local sugarcane growers. In November 1987 Farleigh Mill merged with other Mackay district mills to create the Mackay Sugar Co-operative Association Ltd.

Coningsby State School opened on 24 November 1884.

Farleigh State School opened on 1 March 1909.

== Demographics ==
In the 2016 census, the locality of Farleigh had a population of 815 people.

In the 2021 census, the locality of Farleigh had a population of 814 people.

== Education ==
Farleigh has two state primary schools located about 3.5 kilometres (2.2 mi) apart.

Coningsby State School is a government primary (Prep–6) school for boys and girls at 1312 Bruce Highway (21.0925°S 149.0688°E). In 2016, the school had an enrolment of 66 students with 5 teachers (4 full-time equivalent) and 5 non-teaching staff (3 full-time equivalent). In 2018, the school had an enrolment of 51 students with 7 teachers (4 full-time equivalent) and 5 non-teaching staff (3 full-time equivalent).

Farleigh State School is a government primary (Prep–6) school for boys and girls on Chidlow Street (21.1066°S 149.1018°E). In 2016, the school had an enrolment of 24 students with 3 teachers (1 full-time equivalent) and 4 non-teaching staff (3 full-time equivalent). In 2018, the school had an enrolment of 33 students with 3 teachers (2 full-time equivalent) and 4 non-teaching staff (2 full-time equivalent).

There are no secondary schools in Farleigh. The nearest government secondary schools are Mackay North State High School in North Mackay to the east and Pioneer State High School in Andergrove, also to the east.

== Amenities ==
St Brigid's Catholic Church is at 961 Bruce Highway (21.1073°S 149.09807°E). It is the hub of the Farleigh parish.

== See also ==
- List of tramways in Queensland
