= Victoria Plains (disambiguation) =

Victoria Plains may refer to:

- Shire of Victoria Plains, a local government area in the Wheatbelt region of Western Australia
- Victoria Plains, name of the former post and telegraph offices at New Norcia, Western Australia
- Victoria Plains, Queensland, a rural locality in Queensland, Australia
- Victoria Plains tropical savanna, an ecoregion in northwestern Australia

== See also ==
- Ord Victoria Plain, an interim Australian bioregion in the Northern Territory and Western Australia
