= Walkerston State Butcher's Shop =

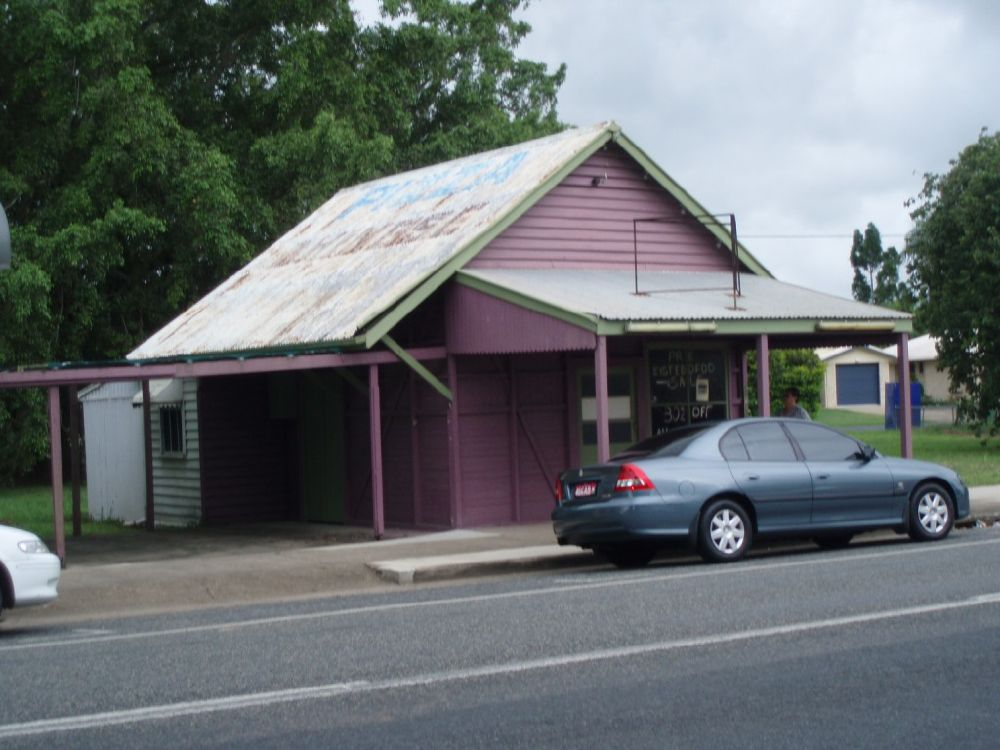
- Walkerston State Butcher's Shop, 2009

- Location within Queensland Location within Australia
- 21.1605°S 149.0666°E
- Location: 13 Dutton Street, Walkerston, Mackay Region, Queensland, Australia

Queensland Heritage Register
- Official name: Walkerston State Butcher's Shop (former)
- Type: state heritage (built)
- Designated: 3 December 2007
- Reference no.: 602659
- Significant period: 1920s

Walkerston State Butcher's Shop is a heritage-listed former butcher shop at 13 Dutton Street, Walkerston, Mackay Region, Queensland, Australia. It was added to the Queensland Heritage Register on 3 December 2007.

== History ==
The small timber former state butcher's shop, built in 1922 in Walkerston, just west of Mackay, stands on the north side of Dutton Street, and is one of the last of the old shops remaining in the town.

The City of Mackay is named for John Mackay, who entered the valley of the Pioneer River in 1860 and established a pastoral run there the following year. In 1862 a settlement was begun on the south bank of the river and by 1863, Mackay had been surveyed and the first lots of land sold. It was gazetted as a port of entry and a customs house was opened. The town prospered as a port and as a commercial and administrative centre, drawing business from nearby pastoral holdings and the sugar plantations being developed along the river. The 1880s saw an expansion in population as the Queensland economy enjoyed a boom and people poured into the colony. The sugar industry was also booming and Mackay continued to develop as an important regional centre.

Walkerston started in the 1860s as a staging centre for teamsters between Mackay and Nebo, and most of the land around Walkerston was selected in the 1860s. F. H. Wilson set up a boiling-down works in 1867, and a number of buildings were present by the time Walkerston received a post office in 1876. In this year Walkerston had a population of 200, compared to Mackay's 2000. A brickyard was also established around this time, and a Provisional School was opened in 1874. Walkerston had two names until 1881: "Alsatia" applied to the area east of Bold Street; and "Walkerston" applied to the area west of Bold Street.

The development of Walkerston was aided by the Pioneer Valley railway line, which reached Mirani in 1885. The presence of seven sugar mills nearby (Alexandra, Pleystowe, Cassada, Branscombe, Lorne, Palms, and Palmyra), built between 1868 and 1883, also boosted Walkerston's economy during the 1880s.

Three state butcher shops were opened in Mackay during 1922, and Walkerston received its own State butcher shop in the same year. In 1915 T. J. Ryan's Labor government won office in wartime Queensland on the strength of promises to improve living standards - principally by addressing the problems of high commodity prices, price-fixing and the emergence of monopolies. The Labor party in general and Ryan and his Treasurer, Ted Theodore, in particular, advocated public ownership of key economic activities, in competition with private enterprise, but at fair prices. They argued that by operating at a reduced profit margin the cost of goods and services provided by State-run enterprises would be reduced, and that the flow-on effect would be to reduce and stabilise prices for similar goods and services provided by the private sector.

In the period 1915–1925 the Queensland Government instituted or acquired a diversity of business enterprises, including a State Insurance Office, a Public Curator's Office, the Golden Casket State Lottery, sawmills and joinery works, mining and fishing ventures (including a string of State Fish Shops), a hotel, a sugar mill, cold stores, plant nurseries, cattle stations and a network of butcher's shops, the process being formalised with the passing of the State Enterprises Act 1918. These activities were part of a broader, pragmatic Labor platform, which advocated state intervention in the private sector to protect individuals against capitalist exploitation, not as a means of involving workers in the control of production, or of raising wage levels. Labor politicians regarded State enterprise as "State capitalism" rather than "State socialism".

In 1915 cattle-raising was one of the principal economic activities of Queensland. Believing that all Queenslanders should have access to meat at fair prices, and needing to maintain a regular supply of cheap meat to the Allied fighting forces, the Ryan government introduced a State-wide system of State-owned butcher's shops which proved to be among the more successful of the numerous state enterprises. The first state butcher's shop was opened in Roma Street, Brisbane, on 12 November 1915, and soon other shops were established in Brisbane suburbs and in regional centres such as Rockhampton, Gympie, Townsville, Charters Towers, and Mount Morgan, following the railway lines via which frozen meat was distributed to the state butcheries.

From 1915 to 1929, 90 state butcher's shops operated in Queensland for various periods, mostly in leased or purchased premises. In fairness to established butcheries, when the state intended to open a butcher's shop in a town or suburb, inspections were made of existing butcheries, to assess the possibility of state acquisition. The peak number of shops operating at any one time was 72, in 1922–23.

Only seven purpose-built butcher's shops appear to have been constructed in Queensland, each built to an individual design. The first purpose-built state butchery was included within the brick Central State Fish Market, South Brisbane (1917–18). Another purpose-built state butchery, also made of brick, was opened in Roma (Roma State Butcher's Shop) in September 1919 after an expenditure of just over £4,000. The Booval State Butchery, built of timber, opened in July 1920, after expenditure of £600; and the Ayr State Butchery opened in July 1921. The latter was constructed of brick and wood, with a cost of just over £2,000. The design included a shop, breaking down room, cold store, engine room, change room, store, fuel shed and a condenser house.

The remaining three purpose-built state butcheries opened in 1922. The Mackay State Butchery, built of timber and fibre-cement, opened in May 1922, with a construction cost of just over £2,600. The Mackay (South Side) State Butchery in George Street was also built of timber and fibre cement, and opened during August 1922, with a construction cost of £327. The timber Walkerston State Butchery opened during November 1922, with a construction cost of about £536.

Cold stores and additions were erected at various butcher's shops, but no other purpose-designed shop was constructed. Initially the state butcher's shops were supplied with frozen meat from meatworks companies, but from 1921 they purchased their own stock, which they killed at their own slaughter-yards, ensuring that the state butcher's shops were supplied always with fresh meat at very competitive prices.

Despite benefits such as the provision of employment, assistance to small farmers and small business, and the provision of cheaper meat to thousands, the State Enterprises scheme as a whole proved an economic failure. Some state enterprises had been purchased at an inflated price; others were located in unsuitable areas or were badly managed; others suffered the effects of economic recession, or of the mid-1920s drought. Following the passing of the Profiteering Prevention Act 1920, other mechanisms were in place for controlling prices. By 1926, Labor premier William McCormack had declared publicly his intention of disposing of unprofitable State Enterprises, although little action was taken at the time. Some of the State butcher shops were disposed of in the period 1926–1928, and when Labor was defeated at the 1929 election, the in-coming Country/Progressive/Nationalist coalition government disposed of most of the remaining State Enterprises, including the 39 remaining state butcher's shops, which ceased trading as of 30 June 1929.

In their 14 years of operation, the state butcher's shops sold over £5 million worth of meat and had made an overall profit to the Treasury of £185,000, but when interest and other charges were factored in, they lost about £6,000. However, this pales by comparison with the combined £2 million loss sustained by the state stations and the state-acquired Chillagoe railway, mines and smelter.

The Walkerston State Butcher shop was built on land previously owned by Annie and William Barwise (publicans at the nearby Duke of Edinburgh Hotel). Title for 19.87 perches of this land was registered to The Commissioner for Trade on 6 November 1922 (the Memorandum of Conveyance had been produced on 3 August 1922). On 12 September 1922 a letter from the Commissioner of the Queensland State Trade Office, W. H. Austin, to the Under Secretary and Director of Public Works, had requested further work on the State Butchery at Walkerston ('now nearing completion'), through the District Foreman of Works at Rockhampton. The works requested were: a paling fence on the front alignment, with post and wire fencing on other three sides; a stable building of timber with an iron roof, containing two stalls with slip rails in front, a feed room (with wooden floor and door), and open space for one cart; and a hardwood cover for the well. An ice chest was also supplied by the Department of Public Works by 4 December 1922.

Title for the land was transferred to Albert A. Cook, John H. Baker, and Kenneth W. Baker in February 1925, and was then transferred to Albert A. Cook and John H. Baker in May 1928. Although the local history "Sugar from the Scrub" claims that the shop was not used as a butcher 's shop after 1928, its subsequent owners were butchers, and it may have continued trading as such.

During its more recent history the Walkerston shop has been used as a pizza shop, and later sold dance supplies. A skillion section clad in fibre cement sheeting has been added to the rear of the shop at some stage, resulting in the boarding over of a rear sash window. A carport is attached to the rear skillion addition, and a more recent carport structure has also been added to the west side of the shop, connecting with the neighbouring modern building.

No equipment related to butchery remains in the shop, although a large fig tree to the rear of the property, near High Street, has metal railings embedded in its branches, possibly used for butchering carcasses. There are also two small concrete vats sitting at the northwest rear corner of the property, purpose unknown.

== Description ==
The former Walkerston State Butcher shop is a small timber building on the north side of Dutton Street, and its street awning, supported by timber posts, projects over the footpath. The front section of the original building has exposed timber framing, whereas the rear section is clad in weatherboards. A later rear extension is clad in both fibre cement sheeting and corrugated iron.

The front facade of the shop has a central doorway, with a large timber-framed four-panel window to the right of the door. The western side of the shop also has a timber double-door entrance. A metal window hood is located above the sash window at the end of the western wing of the rear section of the shop.

The original shop has a T shape, with the head of the T to the rear. The corrugated iron gabled roof thus has wider eaves towards the front of the building than it does to the rear. The gables have been vented at each apex by wedging the weatherboarding slightly open. The skillion roofed street awning has a timber valance, and the rear extension also has a skillion roof. An open skillion carport extends further to the rear behind the enclosed addition.

Internally, the shop has an open area to the front, measuring about 4.8 metres (16 ft) square, with a mansard-profile timber ceiling. Between the top of the side walls and the ceiling, sheets of perforated material have been set between the timber framing to provide ventilation. A doorway at the rear of this space leads into a kitchen, with modern fittings, which occupies the eastern rear wing of the building. A doorway to the left leads from the kitchen into the western rear wing, now used as a small storeroom. Both wings have sash windows that have been sealed. The west wing also has a rear-facing sash window that has been sealed after the addition of the rear extension. Both wings have mansard- profile timber ceilings.

A doorway from the kitchen leads into the rear skillion addition. The rear addition appears to have had a serving window that has been sealed, facing the rear yard, to the west of the carport. The interior of the kitchen and the rear addition are clad in plasterboard sheeting, but the remainder of the interior of the shop has vertical timber boarding. To the northeast of the rear of the shop is a raised concrete slab, which may cover an old well. Further to the rear of the shop is a large fig tree, which has two ingrown steel rails on its northern side, one vertical and set in the ground, the other set at a diagonal down into the tree. Two small rectangular open-top concrete vats stand in the northwest corner of the allotment.

A recent flat-roofed carport structure connects the front of the western side of the shop to the neighbouring building, and is not historically significant.

== Heritage listing ==
The former Walkerston State Butcher's Shop was listed on the Queensland Heritage Register on 3 December 2007 having satisfied the following criteria.

The place is important in demonstrating the evolution or pattern of Queensland's history. The former State Butcher's Shop at Walkerston, erected in 1922, is a result of the political and economic experiment embodied by the State Enterprises Act of 1918. Between 1915 and 1925 successive Queensland Labor governments established various State enterprises, with the network of State butcher's shops being among the more successful of these experiments. The highly co-coordinated, statewide system of State butcheries provided cheaper meat to thousands of Queensland families between 1915 and 1929.

The place demonstrates rare, uncommon or endangered aspects of Queensland's cultural heritage. The timber Walkerston shop was one of only seven purpose-designed State butcher's shops constructed 1917–1922 - most of the State butcher's shops operated from leased or purchased premises. The only other known surviving State butcher, at Roma, is a larger, brick building.

The place is important in demonstrating the principal characteristics of a particular class of cultural places. The place is important in illustrating the principal characteristics of a modest example of a purpose-designed State butcher's shop of its era. The large front window, the street awning, and ventilation at the top of the walls also reflect the design of butcher shops of the period. The large roof overhang above the front section also appears to be an attempt to reduce the temperature within the shop.

The place is important because of its aesthetic significance. As one of the last of the old shops in Walkerston, it makes an important contribution to the built character of the town.

== See also ==
- List of butcher shops
