= Balnagowan =

Balnagowan may refer to:

- Balnagown Castle, a castle near the village of Kildary in Easter Ross, part of the Highland area of Scotland
- Balnagowan, Queensland, a locality in Mackay Region, Queensland, Australia
