= Greenmount, Queensland (Mackay Region) =

Greenmount
- Suburb
- Interactive map of Greenmount
- Coordinates: 21.1822°S 149.0327°E
- Country: Australia
- State: Queensland
- LGA: Mackay Region
- Location: 21.3 km (13.2 mi) SW of Mackay CBD; 24.5 km (15.2 mi) ESE of Mirani; 980 km (610 mi) NNW of Brisbane

Government
  - State electorate: Mirani
  - Federal division: Capricornia

Area
  - Total: 17.8 km^{2} (6.9 sq mi)

Population
  - Total: 488 (2021 census)
  - Density: 27.42/km^{2} (71.01/sq mi)
- Time zone: UTC+10:00 (AEST)
- Postcode: 4751
Suburbs around Greenmount
Pleystowe	Pleystowe	Walkerston
Marian	Greenmount	Palmyra
Victoria Plains	Palmyra	Palmyra

Greenmount is a rural locality in the Mackay Region, Queensland, Australia. In the 2021 census, Greenmount had a population of 488 people.

== History ==
In 1861 John Mackay (the first British person to explore Mackay area and after whom the city is named) leased a pastoral run which he called Greenmount. In order to meet the government's requirement that the run have stock on it within nine months, he entered into a partnership with James Starr, a squatter from the New England district, and 1200 cattle were on the run by January 1862. However, Starr became insolvent and there was a forced sale of the property in 1863, ending Mackay's association with the Mackay area.

== Demographics ==
In the 2016 census, Greenmount had a population of 473 people.

In the 2021 census, Greenmount had a population of 488 people.

== Heritage listings ==
Greenmount has a number of heritage-listed sites, including:

- Greenmount Homestead, Greenmount Road

== Education ==
There are no schools in Greenmount. The nearest government primary schools are Walkerston State School in neighbouring Walkerston to the north-east and Marian State School in neighbouring Marian to the west. The nearest government secondary schools are Mackay State High School in South Mackay to the north-east and Mirani State High School in Mirani to the west.
