= Greenmount, Queensland =

Greenmount, Queensland may refer to:

- Greenmount Beach, a beach on the Gold Coast of Queensland
  - Greenmount, a neighbourhood in the City of Gold Coast within the suburb of Coolangatta
- Greenmount, Queensland (Mackay Region), a rural locality in Central Queensland
- Greenmount, Queensland (Toowoomba Region), a rural town on the Darling Downs, Queensland
