= Homebush Mission Hall =

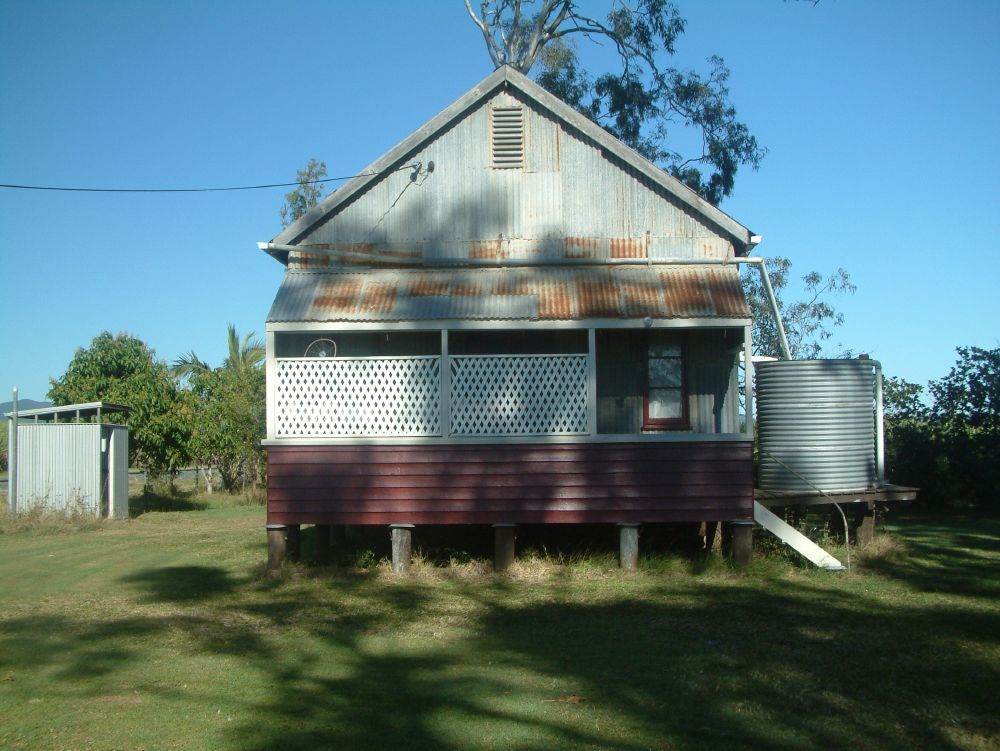
- Homebush Mission Hall, 2005

- Location within Queensland Location within Australia
- 21.2712°S 149.0633°E
- Location: 993 Homebush Road, Homebush, Mackay Region, Queensland, Australia

History
- Design period: 1870s - 1890s (late 19th century)
- Built: c. 1892, 1918

Queensland Heritage Register
- Official name: Homebush Mission Hall
- Type: state heritage (landscape, built)
- Designated: 6 January 1997
- Reference no.: 601705
- Significant period: 1890s-1900s (historical); 1890s - ongoing (social)
- Significant components: hall, trees/plantings, views to

Homebush Mission Hall is a heritage-listed mission at 993 Homebush Road, Homebush, Mackay Region, Queensland, Australia. It was initially built c. 1892 but was substantially rebuilt in 1918. It was added to the Queensland Heritage Register on 6 January 1997.

== History ==
The association of the South Sea Island community with this site began in 1892 when the Colonial Sugar Refining Company donated land from their Homebush holding for a community meeting house.

The Pioneer Valley lay within the southern section of the Kennedy land district. While pastoral land in the Leichhdart and Port Curtis districts was opened for settlement in the early 1850s, the Kennedy was not opened for selection until November 1859. The first settlers established large runs across the entire Pioneer Valley. By the late 1860s pastoral holdings dominated the district although some land was utilised for agriculture around the township of Mackay.

Twenty years later agriculture, particularly sugar growing, had superseded pastoralism in the valley. Pastoralism declined because sheep were affected by footrot and spear grass and there were no local markets for cattle. Several of the early settlers, struggling to maintain their pastoral holdings, experimented with sugar cane on the rich soil of the valley.

The burgeoning sugar cane industry was greatly assisted by the opening of markets in Europe after sugar supplies were cut during the American Civil War. A further impetus was the establishment of steam powered mills in the district in 1868. By 1878 4,844 acres (1,960 ha) was under cane in the valley.

Indentured Melanesian labour was used to run the plantations and mills. Over 62,000 Pacific Islanders were contracted as indentured labourers in Queensland between 1863 and 1904. The everyday lives of these indentured labourers was controlled by Europeans, particularly in the area of education. South Sea Islanders mostly received their education through the Mission School System, developed by Christian churches throughout the district. These mission schools, established away from the parent church, taught Christianity using full time missionary and Melanesian lay teachers. The school combined religious education with general education. Older people attended Sunday services, baptisms and other church services and were taught to read and write at night classes.

The Homebush Mission Hall was established by the Presbyterian Church on land donated by the Colonial Sugar Refining Company at Homebush. The building, which had been constructed of corrugated iron and timber stumps, supplied by the trustees, looked on to the mill road, which ran along the tramline to the combined road and tramline bridge over Sandy Creek.

The Mission Hall officially came under the trusteeship of Frederick Culverhouse, a butcher of Sandy Creek near Homebush, of Neil Petersen, a farmer of "Marseille" (sic), Homebush and Frank James Stevens, a farmer of "Colston Vale," Homebush on 28 June 1892. Trusteeship of the hall did not pass to the South Sea Islander community until 1992. An anti-Asian/Islander immigration movement, which had its foundations in the mining fields of southern Australia in the 1850s, had grown in strength and general acceptance by the late nineteenth century. The introduction of various pieces of legislation made the White Australia Policy a fact in law by the beginning of the twentieth century. Specific legislation in 1901 and 1903 restricted the immigration of labourers from the Pacific Islands. A Queensland royal commission in April, 1906 reported on the number of South Sea Islanders to be deported by the end of 1906, while, at the same time, amendments were made to the Federal Pacific Islander Labourers Act to discontinue further immigration from the islands of the Pacific.

In North Queensland, South Sea Islander political activists formed the Pacific Islanders Association in May 1901 to protest against the deportation of members of the community. Deportation meant that people who had lived in Australia for many years would be sent back to their country of birth leaving family behind. The Pacific Islanders Association was active for several years with meetings and protest gatherings held in locations such as the Homebush Mission Hall.

In the 1918 Mackay cyclone the Mission Hall was severely damaged, almost to the point of total demolition, and was later rebuilt, to face the Homebush Road, with mostly original material and with donations from trustees, Stevens and Petersen, and with a small sum from the Homebush Mill. For the next five decades the Mission Hall served the local community as a place of worship, social gatherings, weddings, Sunday school, picnics, meetings and other entertainment. The regularity of church, Sunday school and social gatherings decreased over the years, as the local population changed.

By the 1970s the hall was no longer in use, and had become dilapidated. In recent years the hall has again become a focus for the local South Sea Island community and is a part of their cultural revival. Many of these people received Sunday schooling there, looking upon the building with great affection and pride.

On 13 January 1992, the hall came under the trusteeship of the Australian South Sea Islander United Council. One of the trustees, Cristine Andrew, has been instrumental in having the building conserved.

== Description ==
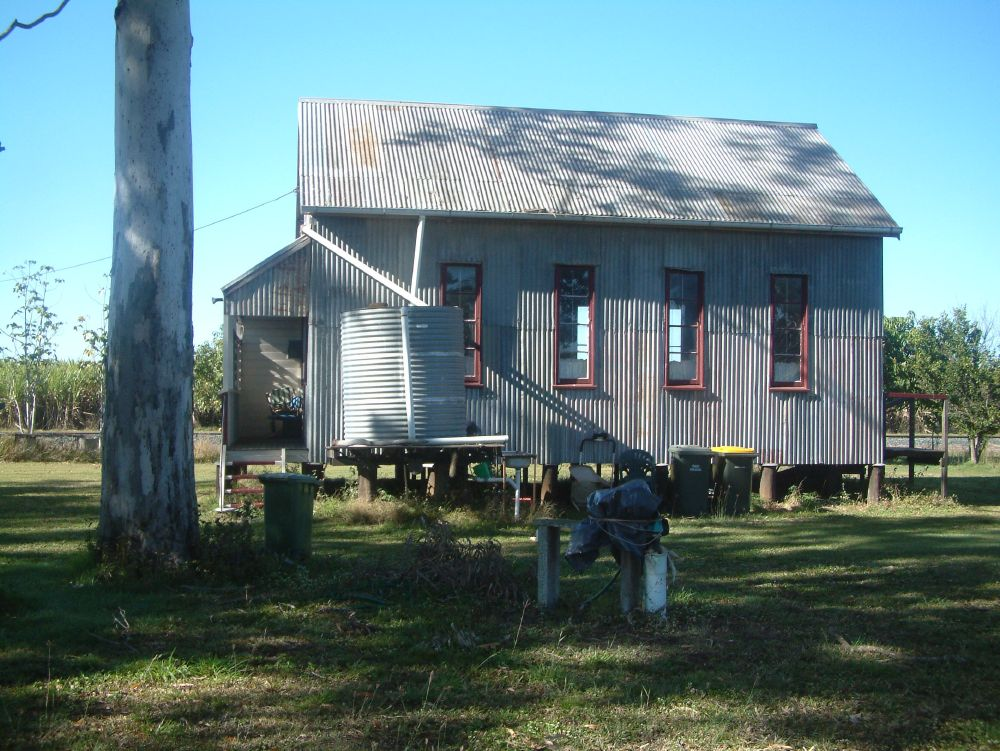
Side view, 2005

The Homebush Mission Hall is a single-storey building of timber and corrugated iron, located a few kilometres to the east of the village of Homebush, about 20 kilometres (12 mi) south of Mackay. It is situated on the western fringe of a small cluster of cottages and surrounded by canefields. Triangular in shape, the site fronts the Homebush-Eton Road along its northern boundary, and has a cane tram line running parallel to its diagonal boundary to the south-east.

The hall is nestled towards the rear corner of the site, and faces north-east. The site is flat and grassed, with a scattering of mature eucalypts and new plantings, and marked by a fence of bush timber posts.

The building is a simple rectangular form (about 9.3 by 6.1 metres (31 ft × 20 ft)), with a projecting entry porch. The gabled roof is corrugated iron, with a lean-to roof over the porch. The walls to the body of the hall are also clad in corrugated iron, and punctuated by four tall, narrow windows to each side. These four-pane windows are horizontally pivoting, and retain some of their early hardware. Centred within the gable at each end is a panel of timber louvres to vent the roof space.

The hall is low-set, with timber stumps to the perimeter, and steel posts to the remainder. There are timber steps to the porch and the rear door. The entry porch is open, and clad in weatherboards and timber lattice. In the wall sheeting behind the porch is a V-shaped cut, being evidence an earlier porch had a gabled form.

There are also two windows, matching those of the sides, to the front wall, one each side of the double entry doors. The interior is a single room, with the timber wall and roof framing exposed. The floor is of narrow (about 50 millimetres (2.0 in)) hardwood boards. The rear door is boarded and braced, and retains some original hardware. To the far end is a raised timber platform, used as the sanctuary for the church services.

Beside the building is a corrugated steel water tank and timber stand. Also on the site is an empty outside "thunderbox" toilet (reputedly from the Sarina Mission), some log seats and a corrugated steel toilet block.

== Heritage listing ==
Homebush Mission Hall was listed on the Queensland Heritage Register on 6 January 1997 having satisfied the following criteria.

The place is important in demonstrating the evolution or pattern of Queensland's history.

The Homebush Mission Hall is an important historical feature in the development, both socially and economically, of the North Queensland region through its strong association with the South Sea Islander labour force which was instrumental in the establishment of the sugar cane industry, particularly in the Mackay District.

The place demonstrates rare, uncommon or endangered aspects of Queensland's cultural heritage.

Although similar examples were once common through the region, it is now a rare example of community meeting place of simple vernacular construction methods using timber and corrugated iron.

The place is important because of its aesthetic significance.

It is also recognised by the broader community for its landmark and rude picturesque qualities.

The place has a strong or special association with a particular community or cultural group for social, cultural or spiritual reasons.

The Mission Hall is strongly associated with the Islander community as a meeting place for religious, social, cultural, educational and community activities for over a century and particularly as a centre for protest meetings against deportation in the first decade of this century.

The place has a special association with the life or work of a particular person, group or organisation of importance in Queensland's history.

The hall continues to be an important part of Islander community life and the recent major conservation works on the hall is evidence of the continuing significance of this building to the South Sea Islander community of the region.
