= Balnagowan, Queensland =

Balnagowan
- Suburb
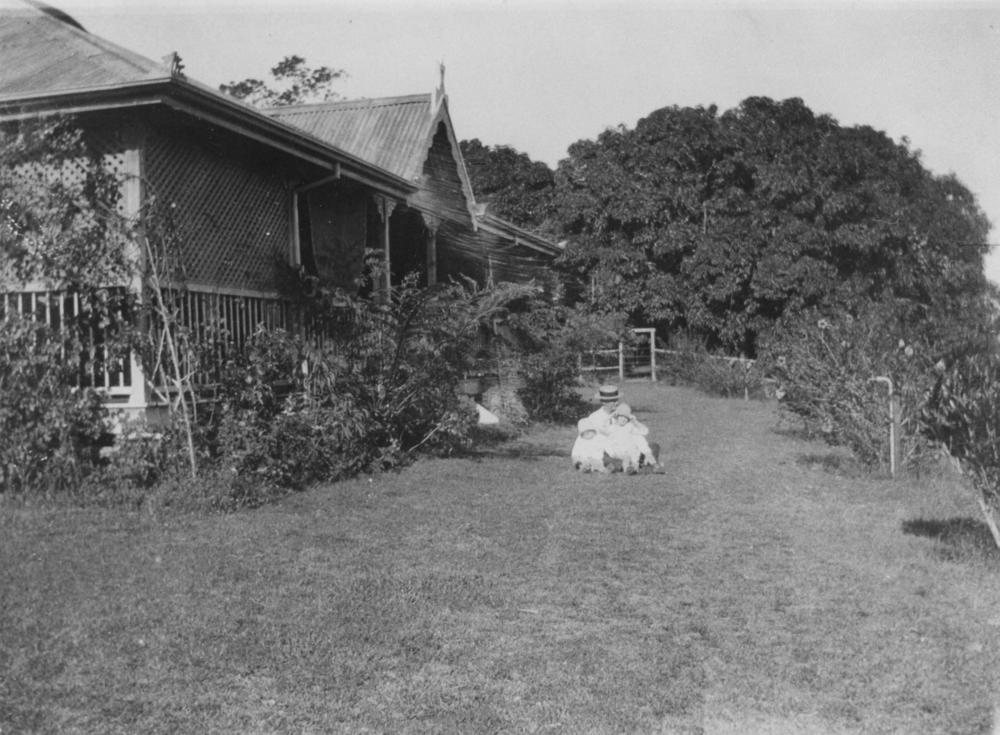
- Balnagowan homestead, circa 1914

- Interactive map of Balnagowan
- Coordinates: 21.1180°S 149.0180°E
- Country: Australia
- State: Queensland
- LGA: Mackay Region
- Location: 11.6 km (7.2 mi) ENE of Marian; 20.5 km (12.7 mi) ENE of Mirani; 20.7 km (12.9 mi) W of Mackay CBD; 988 km (614 mi) NNW of Brisbane

Government
  - State electorate: Whitsunday
  - Federal division: Dawson

Area
  - Total: 40.8 km^{2} (15.8 sq mi)

Population
  - Total: 438 (2021 census)
  - Density: 10.735/km^{2} (27.80/sq mi)
- Time zone: UTC+10:00 (AEST)
- Postcode: 4740
Suburbs around Balnagowan
Hampden	The Leap	Farleigh
Hampden	Balnagowan	Dumbleton
Marian	Pleystowe	Walkerston

Balnagowan is a rural locality in the Mackay Region, Queensland, Australia. In the 2021 census, Balnagowan had a population of 438 people.

== Geography ==
The Pioneer River forms the southern boundary of the locality. It ultimates flows into the Coral Sea at Mackay.

The land use is predominantly crop growing (mostly sugarcane) with some grazing on native vegetation. There are some cane train tramways in the locality to transport the harvested sugarcane to the local sugar mills.

== History ==
Balnagowan was settled by John Cook and Louis Gerald Ross in 1862. Ross named it Balnagowan after his home in Scotland. Ross died in 1870 at Balnagowan. The Balnagowan homestead is still visible on a 1976 map (21.13938°S 149.02587°E).

Balnagowan State School opened on 6 February 1950. It closed on 24 January 1977. It was one of 11 schools closed in 1977 due to falling student numbers where transport was available to access other local schools. It was on a 5-acre (2.0 ha) site at 12 Coxs Road (21.1226°S 149.0298°E).

== Demographics ==
In the 2016 census, Balnagowan had a population of 418 people.

In the 2021 census, Balnagowan had a population of 438 people.

== Education ==
There are no schools in Balnagowan. The nearest government primary schools are:

- Walkerston State School in neighbouring Walkerston to the south-east
- Coningsby State School in neighbouring Farleigh to the north-east
- Hampden State School in neighbouring Hampden to the north-west
- Marian State School in neighbouring Marian to the south-west

The nearest government secondary schools are:

- Mackay North State High School in North Mackay to the east
- Mackay State High School in South Mackay to the east
- Mirani State High School in Mirani to the south-west
