= Dumbleton, Queensland =

Dumbleton
- Suburb
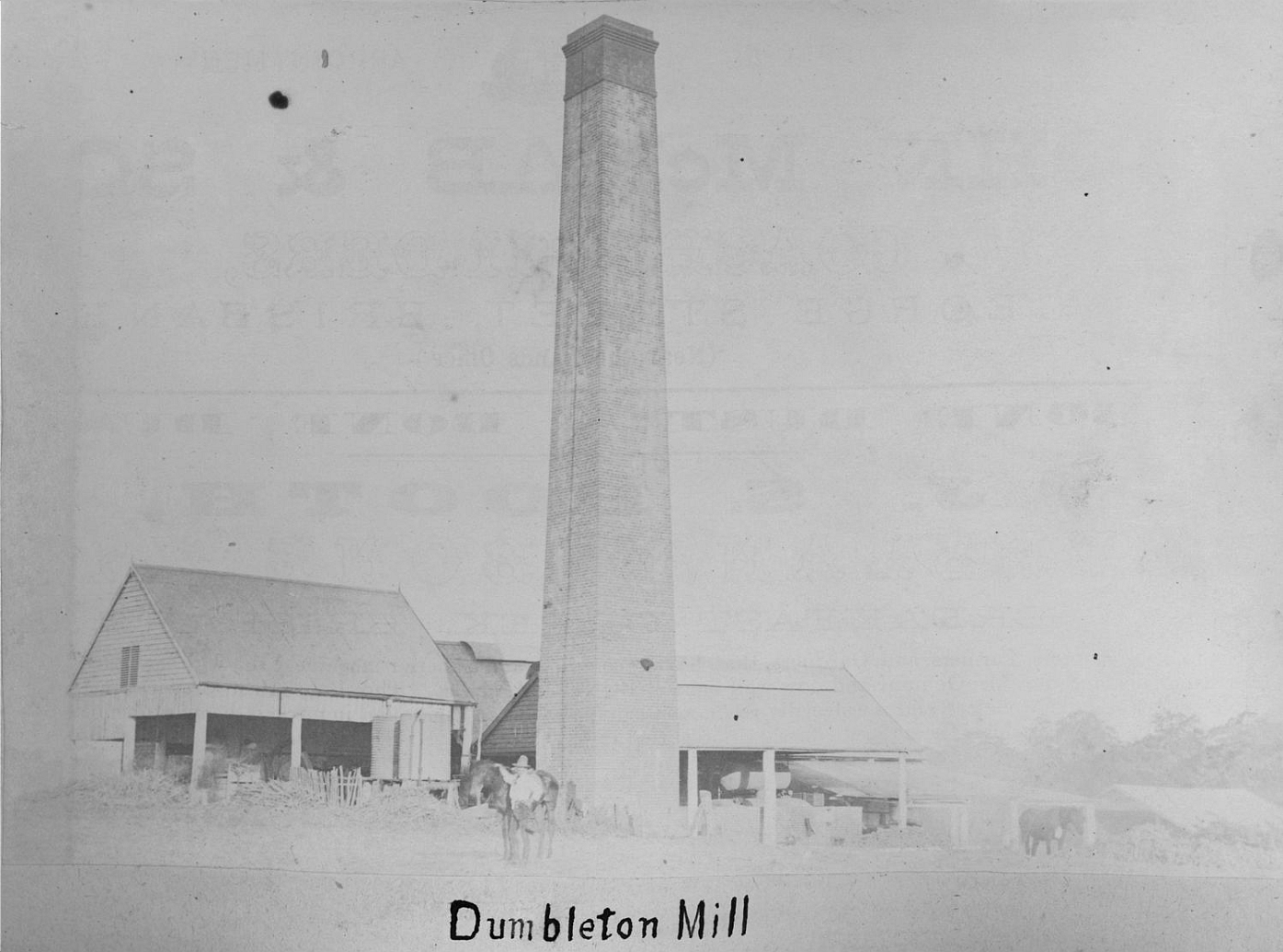
- Dumbleton Sugar Mill, circa 1882

- Interactive map of Dumbleton
- Coordinates: 21.135°S 149.0763°E
- Country: Australia
- State: Queensland
- LGA: Mackay Region
- Location: 9.7 km (6.0 mi) SW of Farleigh; 15.8 km (9.8 mi) W of Mackay CBD; 990 km (620 mi) NNW of Brisbane

Government
  - State electorate: Whitsunday
  - Federal division: Dawson

Area
  - Total: 12.6 km^{2} (4.9 sq mi)

Population
  - Total: 242 (2021 census)
  - Density: 19.21/km^{2} (49.74/sq mi)
- Time zone: UTC+10:00 (AEST)
- Postcode: 4740
Suburbs around Dumbleton
Farleigh	Farleigh	Farleigh
Balnagowan	Dumbleton	Erakala
Walkerston	Alexandra	Alexandra

Dumbleton is a rural locality in the Mackay Region, Queensland, Australia. In the 2021 census, Dumbleton had a population of 242 people.

== Geography ==
The locality is bounded to the south by the Pioneer River. Falls Hill rises 56 metres (184 ft) above sea level and is immediately north of the river (21.1389°S 149.0766°E). The Dumbleton Rocks Weir is across the river in this area (21.14222°S 149.07613°E). The elevations range from 5 metres (16 ft) near the river to 169 metres (554 ft) in the north-west of the locality.

The lower land near the river is mostly used for growing sugarcane. There is a network of cane tramways to transport the harvested sugarcane to the local sugar mills. The higher land is used for grazing on native vegetation and rural residential housing.

== History ==
In 1865, Alfred Hart Lloyd purchased land on the northern bank of the Pioneer River. He entered into a partnership with Charles Walker to establish the Dumbleton sugar plantation. Walker named the plantation after his home town Dumbleton in Gloucestershire, England. They established the Dumbleton sugar mill in 1872. Walker drowned in the river in January 1880. The mill was dismantled and sold in 1887.

Dumbleton State School opened in 1926. It closed circa 1949. It was at approx 156 Farleigh Dumbleton Road, now within the neighbouring suburb of Erakala (21.13203°S 149.10372°E).

== Demographics ==
In the 2016 census, Dumbleton had a population of 242 people.

In the 2021 census, Dumbleton had a population of 242 people.

== Education ==
There are no schools in Dumbleton. The nearest government primary schools are Coningsby State School and Farleigh State School, both in neighbouring Farleigh to the north. The nearest government secondary school is Mackay North State High School in North Mackay to the east.
