= Alexandra, Queensland =

Alexandra Mackay, Queensland
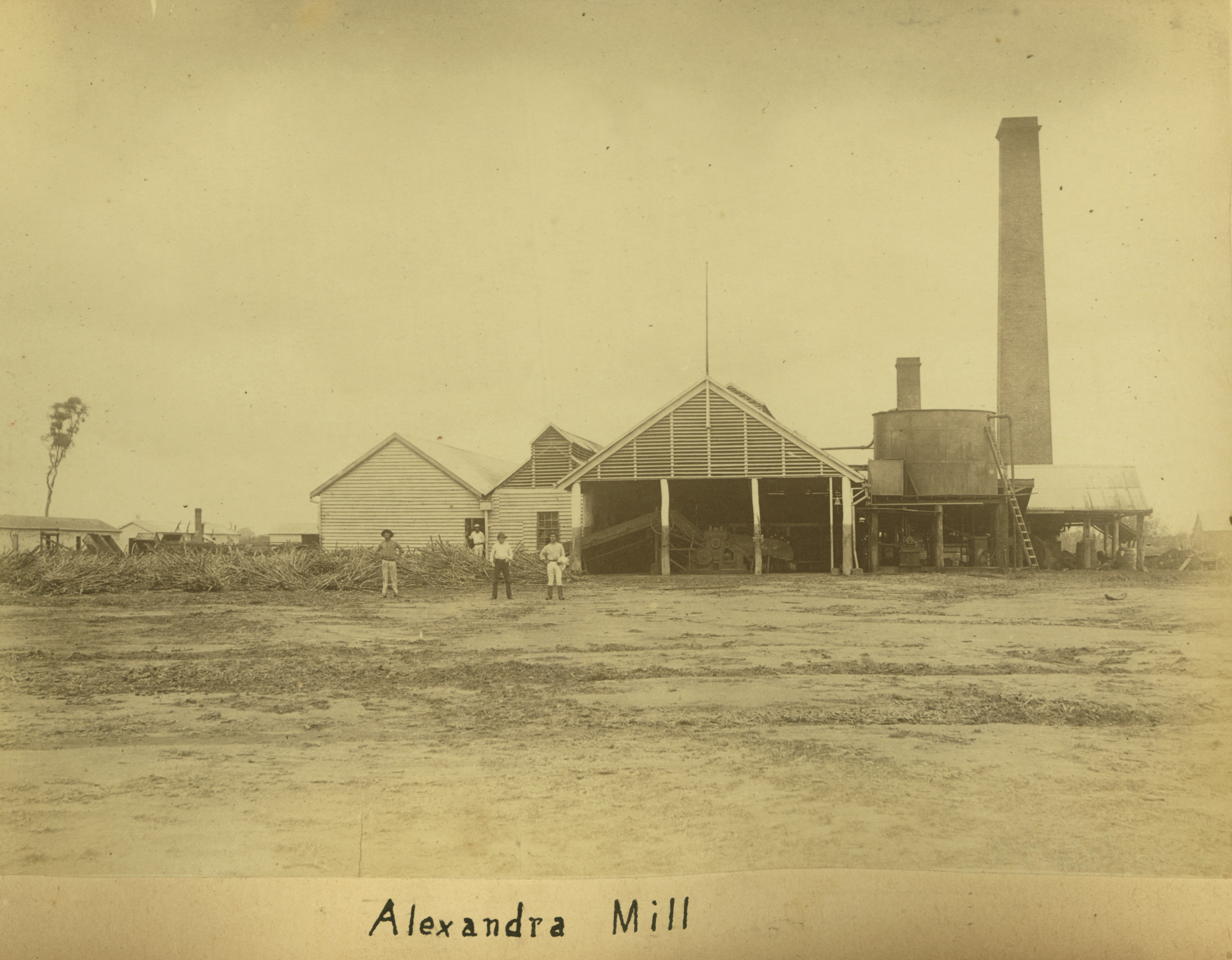
- Alexandra Sugar Mill, circa 1880

- Coordinates: 21.1580°S 149.0902°E
- Population: 189 (2021 census)
  - Density: 25.20/km^{2} (65.3/sq mi)
- Postcode(s): 4740
- Area: 7.5 km^{2} (2.9 sq mi)
- Time zone: AEST (UTC+10:00)
- Location: 11.5 km (7 mi) WSW of Mackay; 337 km (209 mi) NNW of Rockhampton; 955 km (593 mi) NNW of Brisbane
- LGA(s): Mackay Region
- State electorate(s): Mirani
- Federal division(s): Capricornia
Suburbs around Alexandra:
Dumbleton	Dumbleton	Erakala
Walkerston	Alexandra	Te Kowai
Walkerston	Palmyra	Te Kowai

Alexandra is a suburb of Mackay in the Mackay Region, Queensland, Australia. In the 2021 census, Alexandra had a population of 189 people.

== Geography ==
Alexandra is flat low-lying land bordered to the north by the Pioneer River and to the south by Bakers Creek. The Peak Downs Highway passes from east to west through the centre of the locality; there is a junction with the Mackay–Eungella Road which exits the locality in the north-west. Most of the housing is clustered around these two roads. Most of the land in the suburb is used for sugarcane farming.

The Finch Hatton branch of the Mackay Railway ran through the locality from east to west with the local area served by the now-dismantled Alexandra railway station (21.1625°S 149.0972°E). After the closure of the railway, a sugarcane tramway replaced it to provide transport for the harvested sugarcane from the canefields to the sugar mills.

== History ==
The suburb's name is taken from the Alexandra sugar mill. The mill, in turn, was named by mill owner Thomas Henry Fitzgerald after Princess Alexandra of Denmark who married Prince Edward (later King Edward VII) of Great Britain on 10 March 1863.

The mill was constructed in 1868 and was the largest sugar mill in Queensland. It operated until 1884. It was located immediately south of the Alexandra railway station (21.16343°S 149.09810°E).

== Demographics ==
In the 2016 census, Alexandra had a population of 193 people.

In the 2021 census, Alexandra had a population of 189 people.

== Education ==
There are no schools in Alexandra. The nearest government primary school is Walkerston State School in neighbouring Walkerston to the west. The nearest government secondary school is Mackay State High School in Mackay to the east.

== See also ==
- List of sugar mills in Queensland
