= Homebush, Queensland =

Homebush
- Town
- Interactive map of Homebush
- Coordinates: 21.2713°S 149.0475°E
- Country: Australia
- State: Queensland
- LGA: Mackay Region
- Location: 25.0 km (15.5 mi) SW of Mackay; 31.1 km (19.3 mi) NNW of Sarina; 31.1 km (19.3 mi) SE of Mirani; 945 km (587 mi) NNW of Brisbane

Government
  - State electorate: Mirani
  - Federal division: Capricornia

Area
  - Total: 60.6 km^{2} (23.4 sq mi)

Population
  - Total: 262 (2021 census)
  - Density: 4.323/km^{2} (11.198/sq mi)
- Time zone: UTC+10:00 (AEST)
- Postcode: 4740
Localities around Homebush
Victoria Plains	Palmyra	Palmyra
Eton	Homebush	Sandiford
Oakenden	Oakenden	Balberra

Homebush is a rural locality in the Mackay Region, Queensland, Australia. In the 2021 census, the locality of Homebush had a population of 262 people.

== History ==
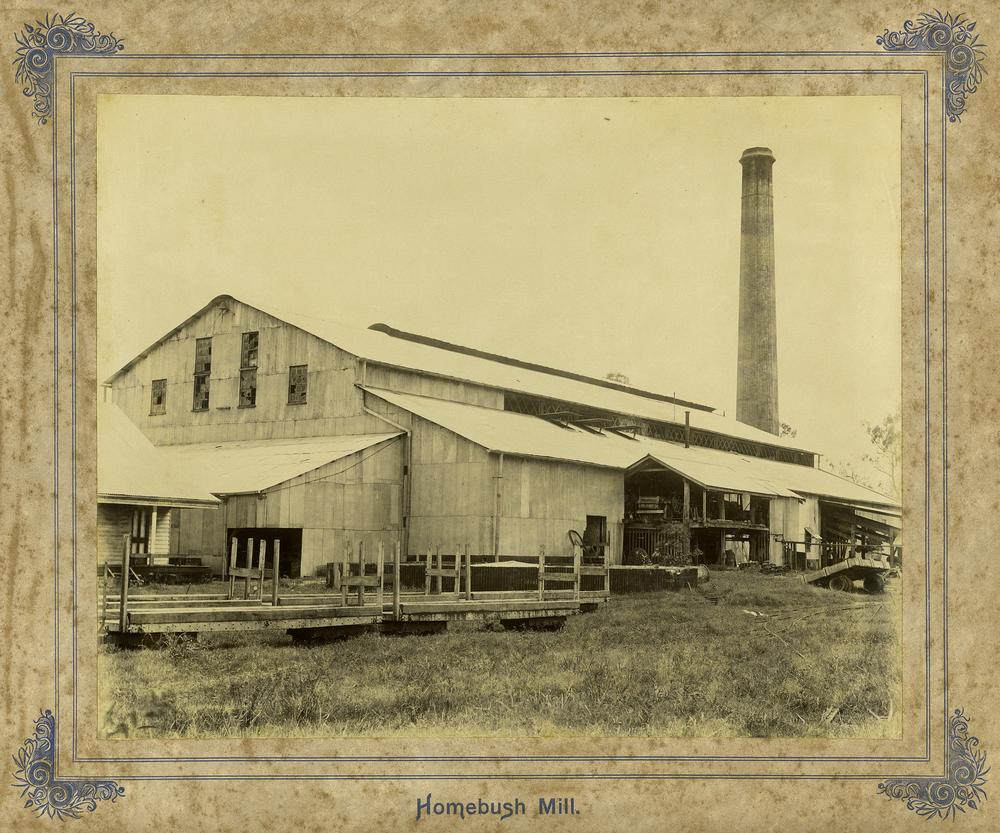
Homebush Sugar Mill, circa 1895

The name Homebush is taken from the name of a pastoral run owned by E. B. Cornish in 1864 and operated by John Walker in 1866. It later became a sugar plantation.

Homebush Post Office opened on 5 December 1883 and closed in 1976.

Homebush Sugar Mill opened in 1883 and closed in 1922.

Homebush State School opened on 24 January 1889. In 2014, Homebush State School celebrated its 125th anniversary.

The opening service for the Homebush Presbyterian Church was held on Sunday 6 October 1912.

== Demographics ==
In the 2011 census, the locality of Homebush had a population of 277 people.

In the 2016 census, the locality of Homebush had a population of 271 people.

In the 2021 census, the locality of Homebush had a population of 262 people.

== Heritage listings ==
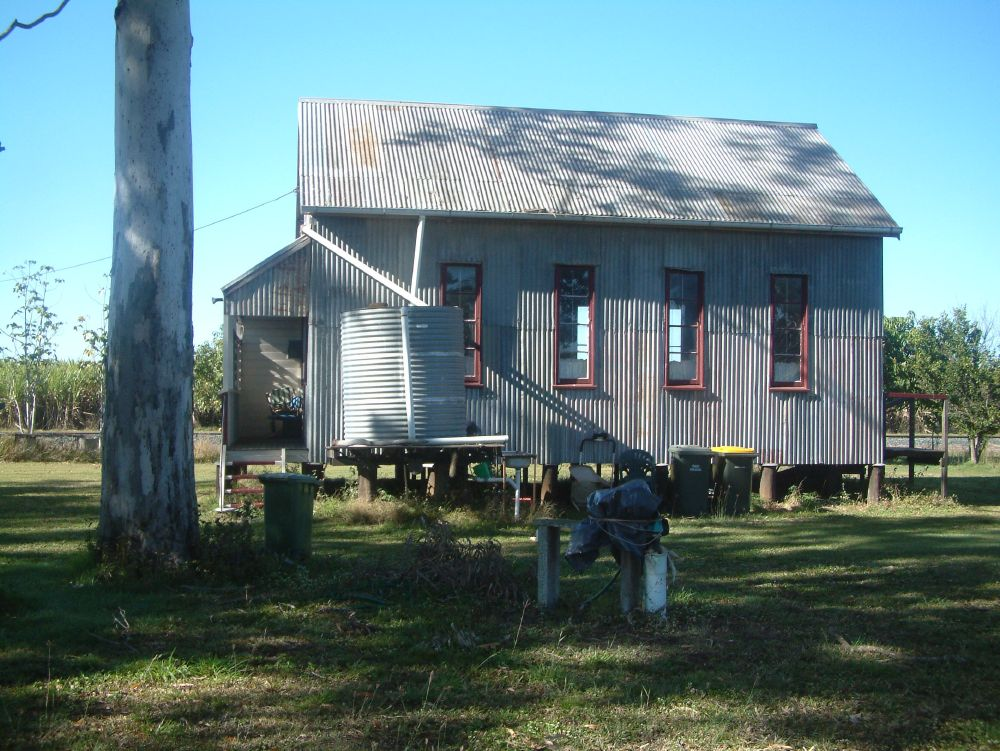
Homebush Mission Hall, side view, 2005

Homebush has a number of heritage-listed sites, including:

- 993 Homebush Road (21.2712°S 149.0633°E): Homebush Mission Hall

== Amenities ==
The Mackay Regional Council operates a mobile library service on a fortnightly schedule at Homebush Road near the school.

== Education ==
Homebush State School is a government primary (Prep-6) school for boys and girls at 1181 Homebush Road (21.2758°S 149.0503°E). In 2016, there were 59 students. In 2018, the school had an enrolment of 48 students with 3 teachers and 7 non-teaching staff (4 full-time equivalent). It includes a special education program.

There are no secondary schools in Homebush. The nearest government secondary schools are Mackay State High School in South Mackay to the north-east, Sarina State High School in Sarina to the south-east, and Mirani State High School in Mirani to the north-west.
