= Walkerston, Queensland =

Walkerston
- Town
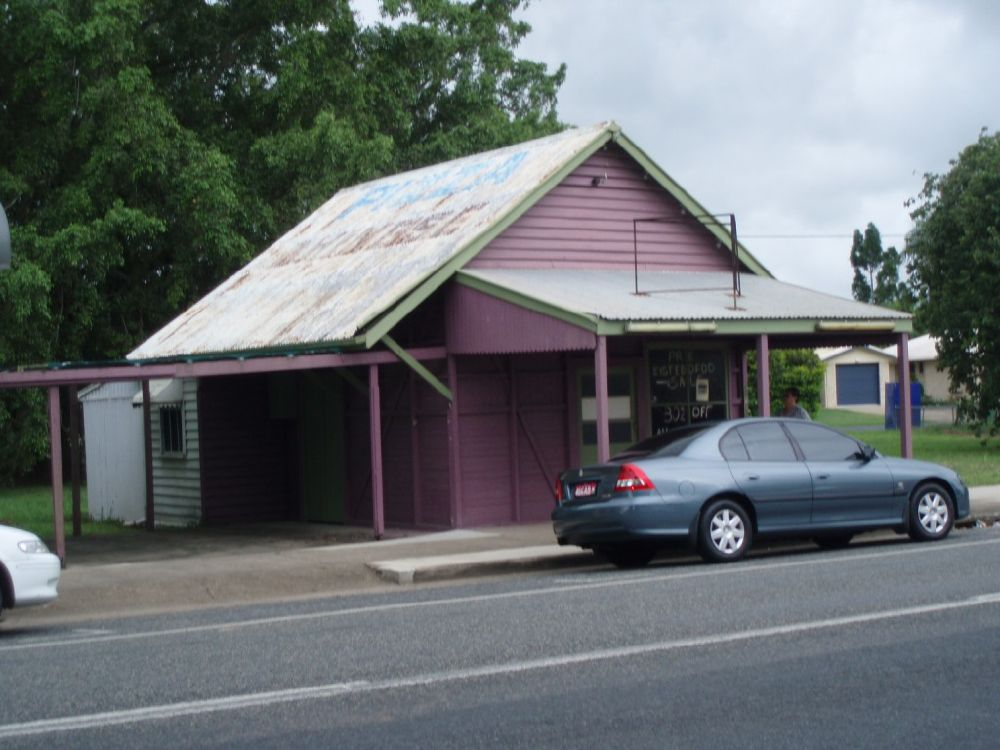
- Walkerston State Butcher's Shop, 2009

- Interactive map of Walkerston
- Coordinates: 21.1608°S 149.0591°E
- Country: Australia
- State: Queensland
- LGA: Mackay Region
- Location: 14 km (8.7 mi) W of Mackay; 956 km (594 mi) NW of Brisbane

Government
  - State electorate: Mirani
  - Federal division: Capricornia

Area
  - Total: 13.9 km^{2} (5.4 sq mi)

Population
  - Total: 3,615 (2021 census)
  - Density: 260.1/km^{2} (673.6/sq mi)
- Time zone: UTC+10:00 (AEST)
- Postcode: 4751
Localities around Walkerston
Balnagowan	Dumbleton	Dumbleton
Pleystowe	Walkerston	Alexandra
Greenmount	Palmyra	Palmyra

Walkerston is a town and locality in Mackay Region, Queensland, Australia. The town is situated on the Peak Downs Highway 14 kilometres (8.7 mi) south-west of Mackay. In the 2021 census, the locality of Walkerston had a population of 3,615 people.

== Geography ==
Walkerston is bounded by the Pioneer River to the north.

The Peak Downs Highway enters the locality from Alexandra in the east, passes through the town (which is in south-west of the locality and then heads south-west exiting the locality to Greenmount.

The town is situated on the Peak Downs Highway 14 kilometres (8.7 mi) south-west of Mackay. Walkerston straddles Bakers Creek for about 3 kilometres (1.9 mi).

Palms is a neighbourhood within Walkerston, located to the east of the town (21°10′00″S 149°04′59″E).

== History ==
In May 1860, Scots-born John Mackay was only 21 years old when he left Armidale, New South Wales in January 1860 with men, horses and provisions in search of land for cattle runs in north Queensland. They travelled up the east coast, taking a mainly inland route until they came to the junction of Cattle Creek and the Pioneer River, in an area about 15 miles west of present-day Walkerston. They then followed the river, firstly named by Mackay's companions as the Mackay River but now known as the Pioneer River.

This town was commonly known as Scrubby Creek from as early as 1866, and sometimes as Baker's Creek; later these two names were interchangeable with Walkerston and, to a lesser degree, Alsatia. Scrubby Creek was definitely not a nickname for Walkerston; there were no inverted commas included when the words were printed in newspapers or almanacs. The name was well deserved, for the wild bush scrub grew luxuriantly on the banks of Baker's Creek.

Walkerston Provisional School opened in November 1874 but closed soon after due to low student numbers. It reopened but then closed on 31 March 1880 with the students transferred to the Alsatia State School which opened on 21 April 1880. About 1891 the school was renamed Walkerston State School.

When the Queensland Surveyor-General combined the two former townships of Walkerston and Alsaia in 1881, he chose to name the combined town Walkerston. John Walker was the lessee of the Homebush pastoral run since 31 May 1866.

The Pioneer Valley railway reached Walkerston from Paget on 10 August 1885. Whilst there was a station building, there was no passenger platform, passengers accessing the trains from the ground.

St John's Catholic Primary School was established on 29 January 1924 by the Sisters of Mercy to provide Catholic education to both children of the town and the largely Maltese farming community. A boarding school was introduced to cater for students further along the Pioneer Valley, an arrangement that continued until 1976. The first lay principal was appointed in 1982 but the Sisters continued to be associated with the school until 1996.

The Polynesian Provisional School opened in 1933 but closed that same year.

The Walkerston public library opened in 1977.

== Demographics ==
In the 2006 census, the town of Walkerston had a population of 2,563 people.

In the 2011 census, the locality of Walkerston had a population of 3,089 people.

In the 2016 census, the locality of Walkerston had a population of 3,403 people.

In the 2021 census, the locality of Walkerston had a population of 3,615 people.

== Heritage listings ==
Walkerston has a number of heritage-listed sites, including:

- Walkerston State Butcher's Shop, 13 Dutton Street
- Greenmount Homestead, Greenmount Road

== Education ==
Walkerston State School is a government primary (Prep–6) school for boys and girls on Dutton Street (21.1589°S 149.0649°E). In 2017, the school had an enrolment of 349 students with 25 teachers (21 full-time equivalent) and 18 non-teaching staff (11 full-time equivalent).

St John's Catholic Primary School is a Catholic primary (Prep–6) school for boys and girls at 23 Creek Street (21.1612°S 149.0663°E). In 2017, the school had an enrolment of 236 students with 20 teachers (15 full-time equivalent) and 13 non-teaching staff (6 full-time equivalent).

There are no secondary schools in Walkerston. The nearest government secondary school is Mackay State High School in South Mackay to the east.

== Amenities ==
The Mackay Regional Council operates a library in Dutton Street.

The town has a supermarket and three bars (including a sports club).
