= Greenmount Homestead =

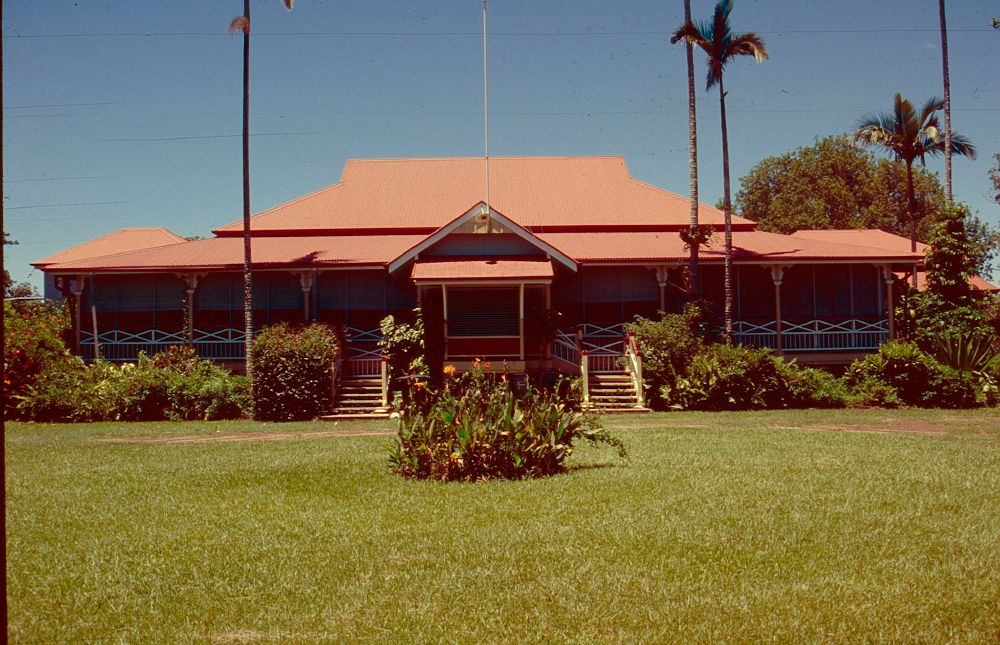
- Greenmount Homestead

- Location within Queensland Location within Australia
- 21.1734°S 149.0321°E
- Location: Greenmount Road, Walkerston, Mackay Region, Queensland, Australia

History
- Design period: 1900–1914 (early 20th century)
- Built: 1915

Site notes
- Architect: William Sykes
- Architectural style: Classicism

Queensland Heritage Register
- Official name: Greenmount Homestead
- Type: state heritage (landscape, built)
- Designated: 6 September 1993
- Reference no.: 600987
- Significant period: 1910s (historical); 1910s–1920s (fabric) ongoing (social)
- Significant components: machinery/plant/equipment – pastoralism, out building/s, residential accommodation – main house, trees/plantings, garden/grounds
- Builders: Arthur Carter & Co

Greenmount Homestead is a heritage-listed homestead at Greenmount Road, Walkerston, Mackay Region, Queensland, Australia. It was designed by William Sykes and built in 1915 by Arthur Carter & Co. It was added to the Queensland Heritage Register on 6 September 1993.

== History ==
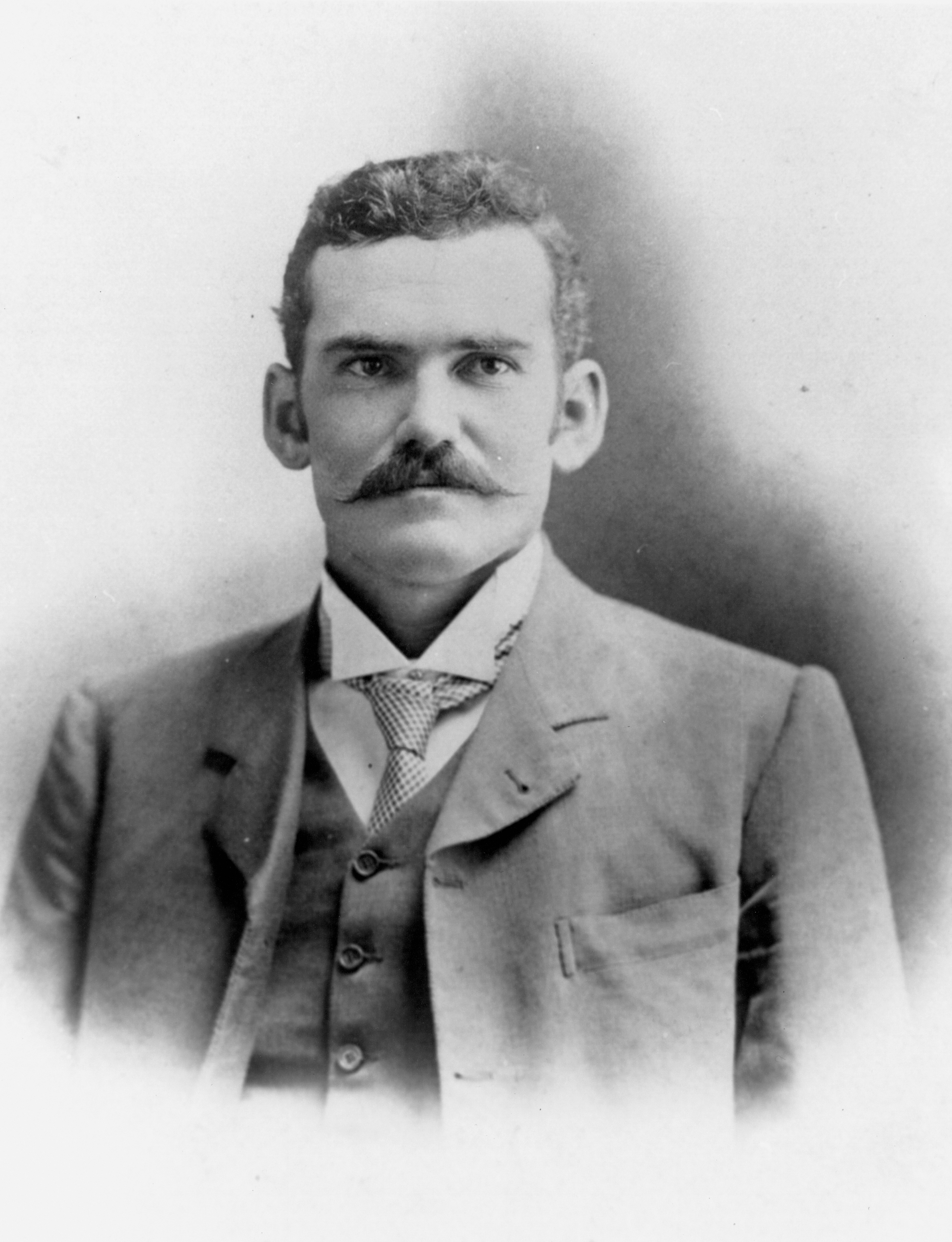
Albert Alfred Cook, 1908

Greenmount Homestead was erected in 1915 for Albert and Vida Cook. Albert Alfred Cook was the son of Kennedy district pioneer John Cook, who took up Balnagowan Station on the northern side of the Pioneer River in 1862. Greenmount Station, on the southern side of the Pioneer River, was taken up in 1861 by John Mackay, the first European settler in the district. In 1864 Mackay forfeited ownership of the lease, and the property passed through a number of owners and resumptions until acquired in 1914 by Vida Althea Cook.

Despite having erected a new homestead at Balnagowan in 1908, which was extended in 1912, the Cooks chose to make their home at Greenmount. In 1914–15 Mackay architect William Sykes prepared the designs for Greenmount Homestead, modifying substantially Albert Cook's rough plans for modelling the new building on the second Balnagowan. The house was erected in July–December 1915 by local Walkerston contractors Arthur Carter & Co., on land overlooking the Cook family company's Pleystowe sugar mill. The fireplace and mantelpiece from the second Balnagowan were removed to Greenmount.

Most of the outbuildings and structures associated with the running of the homestead were erected in 1915: the cattle dip and yards, house well, tank stand, gas house, and septic tank; the motor buggy house at Balnagowan was dismantled and re-erected at Greenmount as a workman's hut; similarly, another motor house and box shed from Balnagowan became a garage at Greenmount. Early in 1916 a motor house was constructed using timber and iron from Balnagowan, a wash house was erected, and the Balnagowan bush house was removed to Greenmount. This was replaced in 1928, and re-built in 1988.

In mid-1918 a dray shed was erected from storm-damaged structures at Balnagowan; the passage connecting the bathroom to the main house was enclosed, as was the kitchen verandah on the southern side; and a schoolroom, constructed of timber and iron from dismantled Balnagowan buildings, was erected between the garage and gas house on the southern side of the house. This was removed in 1954 to a ridge near the cattle yards and used as married quarters. An electricity generator was installed in 1925, and in the following year a workshop and skillion were erected.

The house has been altered little since the 1920s. In the 1950s the western verandah and part of the front verandah were glazed and a bathroom added, and flywire screens were placed on the remaining verandahs. The roof and guttering were replaced in 1988.

At Greenmount c. 1917, the Cooks established one of Queensland's first Aberdeen-Angus studs. This breed had been introduced in Australia c. 1840, but by the 1880s, numbered little more than 1,000 head in Queensland, which was then the largest beef producer in the Australian colonies. In the 1910s, Queensland cattle breeders were reassessing the beef and milk production values of the Aberdeen-Angus, and Albert Cook was amongst this vanguard. Following Albert's death in 1948 his son Thomas took over the management of Greenmount, and in the 1950s introduced Brahmans and Brahman crossbreeds to the Greenmount stud.

Following Thomas Cook's death in 1981, the homestead on 11.3 hectares (28 acres), together with three generations of the Cook family's furniture and effects, was given by his widow to the Pioneer Shire Council (now the Mackay Regional Council), which leases the property to the Mackay Historical Society as a museum. The grounds, maintained by the society as the Tom and Dorothy Cook Memorial Park, include a fig tree (Ficus sp.) believed to have been planted by John Mackay in 1862.

Several small timber buildings have been moved onto the site since its lease to the Mackay Historical Society: the old Walkerston railway station c. 1986, and two former single men's barracks from the Marian sugar mill, in 1991. These do not form part of the listing in the Queensland Heritage Register.

== Description ==
Greenmount Homestead, consisting of the main house and various outbuildings, is situated on an easterly slope with a ridge to the southwest. The site, one of the few elevated sites in the area, overlooks canefields and contains a formal garden to the north, a dam to the east and mature trees.

The main house is a single-storeyed timber building with a corrugated iron gambrel roof with projecting gables. The building is encircled by verandahs with lower skillion roofs which connect a kitchen house on the southwest and an office on the southeast, both with corrugated iron hipped roofs. The building has timber stumps with timber slab and woven sheet infill.

The north elevation is symmetrical with a central projecting gabled entry porch with twin side stair, recessed seat and timber louvres. The gable has shingle cladding and a lower awning supported by deep, curved timber brackets. The verandahs have crossbraced railing, timber posts and brackets and raked, lined ceilings. The verandahs have been enclosed, with the south and east having sash and casement windows, and the remaining verandahs having flywire. The kitchen house and office buildings are clad in corrugated iron and have metal window hoods.

French doors with fanlights open onto the verandahs, and the recessed main entry has a timber panelled door with leadlight glass inserts, sidelights and fanlight. An etched glass panel in the door has the inscription GREENMOUNT. The floorplan consists of bedrooms to the east and west, a drawing room on the north with a large bay window and a large dining room on the south. An ensuite has been built on the west verandah.

Internally, the building has ornate pressed metal ceilings, single skin tongue and groove timber walls, timber batten arches, sash windows and fanlights above internal doors. The building houses original furniture, fittings and artefacts which belonged to the Cook family.

The formal garden to the north of the building comprises a circular drive and lawn enclosed by hedges and palms. A fernery is located to the west of the building. An avenue of mango (Mangifera indica) trees, lining the original driveway, is located to the south of the building and continues onto the adjoining property. Large figs (Ficus sp.) are located around the site which is currently accessed from the northwest.

Outbuildings include; hipped roofed, corrugated iron clad blacksmith's workshop, laundry/outside shower and a lighting plant shed to the south, sulky shed and garage to the southeast; a skillion roofed, corrugated iron clad staff shed with an ant bed floor to the south; a gabled roof, asbestos cement sheeted seed house to the west; and the timber and iron Balnagowan kitchen/schoolhouse and a cattle dip which are on an adjoining property to the southwest. Other structures include a kennel, chicken coop and tank stands. These buildings also contain much of the original machinery and fixtures.

Buildings and machinery recently moved to the site, and not part of the original homestead complex, include two small timber buildings, a gabled roof timber railway station located to the northeast and various farming machinery.

== Heritage listing ==
Greenmount Homestead was listed on the Queensland Heritage Register on 6 September 1993 having satisfied the following criteria.

The place is important in demonstrating the evolution or pattern of Queensland's history.

Greenmount Homestead at Walkerston demonstrates a now uncommon aspect of Queensland's cultural heritage, as the main house and its associated outbuildings and structures, and the formal garden, furniture and personal effects, form a cohesive and intact grouping which together demonstrate a way of life no longer common. The house, together with the large group of associated outbuildings and structures and the formal garden, and the physical arrangement of these elements, are important in demonstrating the principal characteristics of an early 20th century Queensland homestead complex. The place is important in exhibiting a range of aesthetic characteristics valued by the local community, in particular the landmark contribution of the buildings and grounds, through form, scale and siting; the quality and intactness of the interiors, including early fixtures and furnishings; and the landscaping, including the substantially intact formal garden. It has a strong association with the local community, which perceives the place as an historically significant element in the Mackay/Walkerston cultural landscape. It has a special association with the Cook family and their contribution to the development of the Mackay region and to the growth of the sugar and cattle breeding industries in Queensland over more than 120 years.

The place demonstrates rare, uncommon or endangered aspects of Queensland's cultural heritage.

Greenmount Homestead at Walkerston comprises a main house, associated outbuildings and structures, a formal garden, furniture, and personal effects. Together, these features reflect a way of life that is less common in Queensland today.

The place is important in demonstrating the principal characteristics of a particular class of cultural places.

The house, together with the large group of associated outbuildings and structures and the formal garden, and the physical arrangement of these elements, are important in demonstrating the principal characteristics of an early 20th century Queensland homestead complex.

The place is important because of its aesthetic significance.

The place is important in exhibiting a range of aesthetic characteristics valued by the local community, in particular the landmark contribution of the buildings and grounds, through form, scale and siting; the quality and intactness of the interiors, including early fixtures and furnishings; and the landscaping, including the substantially intact formal garden.

The place has a strong or special association with a particular community or cultural group for social, cultural or spiritual reasons.

It has a strong association with the local community, which perceives the place as an historically significant element in the Mackay/Walkerston cultural landscape.

The place has a special association with the life or work of a particular person, group or organisation of importance in Queensland's history.

It has a special association with the Cook family and their contribution to the development of the Mackay region and to the growth of the sugar and cattle breeding industries in Queensland over more than 120 years.
