= Pleystowe Sugar Mill =

Coordinates: 21.1426°S 149.0387°E

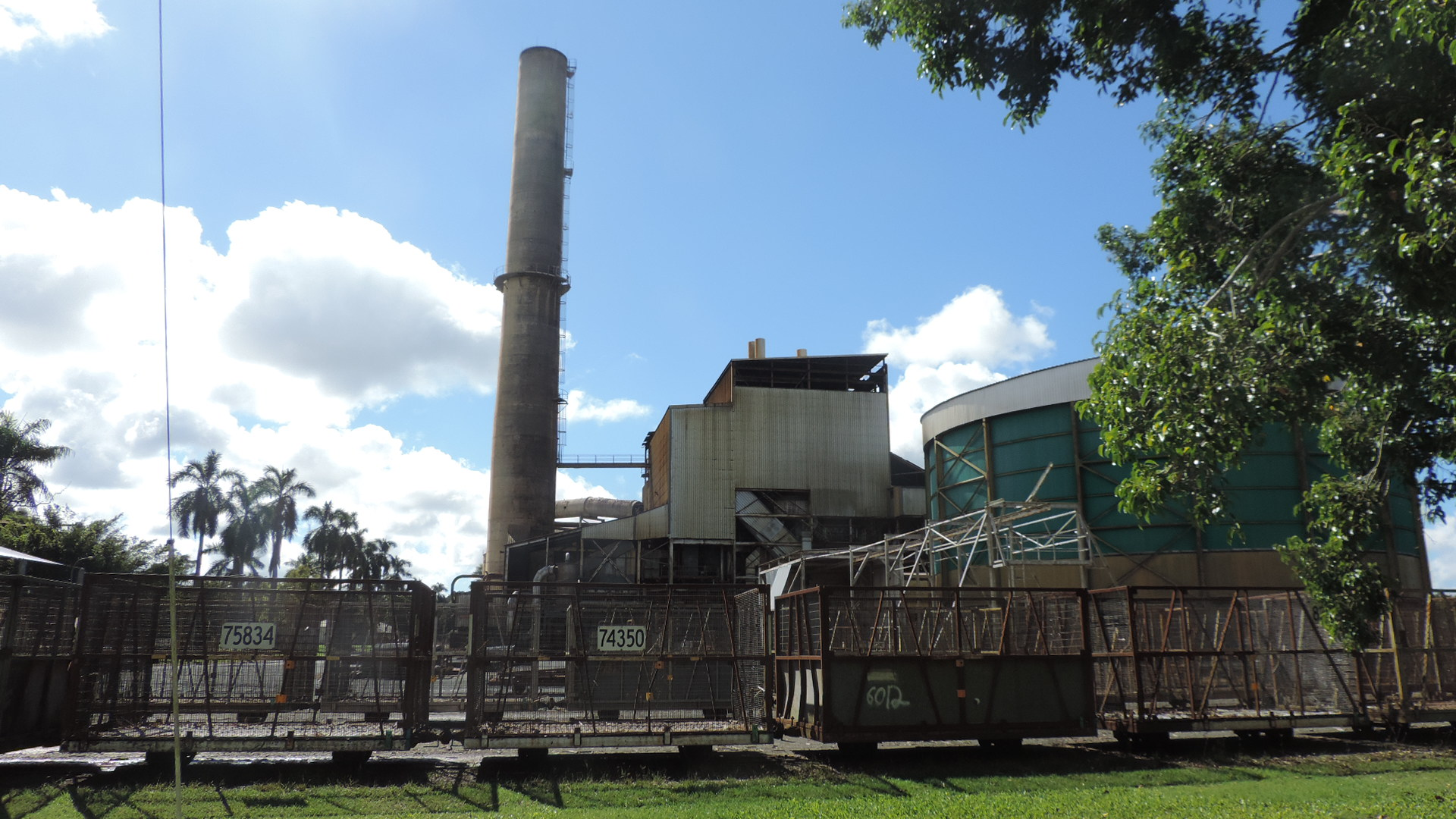
Pleystowe sugar mill, 2016

Pleystowe Sugar Mill is a former sugar mill in Pleystowe, Mackay Region, Queensland, Australia. It is owned by Mackay Sugar. It closed in October 2008 after 139 years, having been the oldest operating sugar mill in Australia at the time of its closure. However, the site continues to provide a number of centralised services to other operating mills within the Mackay Sugar group.

== See also ==
- List of sugar mills in Queensland
