= John Mackay (Australian pioneer) =

Scottish-born explorer, sailor and harbourmaster

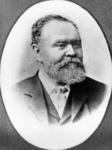
- Born: 26 March 1839; Inverness, Scotland
- Died: 11 March 1914 (aged 74); South Brisbane, Queensland, Australia
- Occupations: Explorer, sailor, harbourmaster
- Years active: 1860−1908
- Spouse: Marion

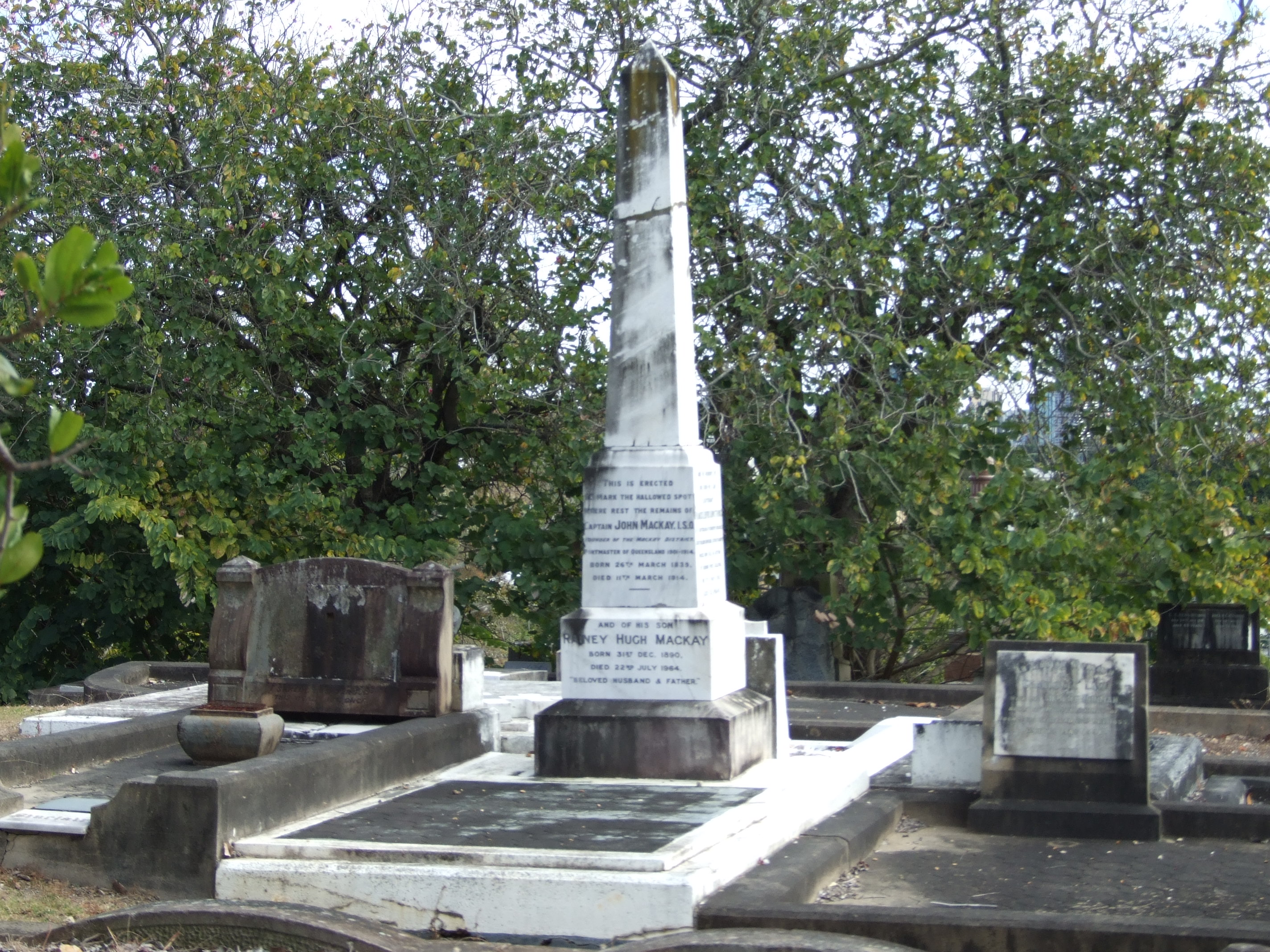
Grave of John Mackay

John Mackay (26 March 1839 – 11 March 1914) was a British explorer, sailor and harbourmaster from Inverness, Scotland, best known for having the town of Mackay, Queensland named after him.

== Early life ==
John Mackay was born on 26 March 1839 to George and Ann Mackay in Inverness. He moved with his parents to Australia in 1854 where they settled a year later in the New England district in the British colony of New South Wales. Mackay's father bought a property he named Ness Cottage on Saumarez Creek near Uralla and became a proprietor of several hotels in that town. As a young man, John Mackay involved himself in gold prospecting at the nearby Rocky River goldfields.

== Expedition to Central Queensland ==
In 1860, Mackay led an exploration party from Uralla to what is now known as the Pioneer River in the central coastal region of Queensland. The group consisted of six Scottish colonists (John Mackay, John McCrossin, Andrew Murray, John Mulldoon, Donald Cameron and Hamilton Robinson), one Italian (Giovanni Barbieri) and one local Anēwan man who was known to the other members as Duke. They left Uralla on 16 January 1860, traveled through the Darling Downs, across the Burnett River and arrived at Gladstone on 22 March. Near Gladstone they encountered a detachment of Native Police as well as skeletal remains of Aboriginals. On 2 April, they arrived at Rockhampton where Mulldoon and Cameron exited the expedition. The rest of the group proceeded north across the Broadsound Range and up the Isaac River and Denison Creek. They encountered multiple communities of Aboriginals along these waterways, firing their weapons above the heads of some and interacting in more friendly terms with others.

Finding that the land in this region had already been marked out by the 1859 expedition of George Elphinstone Dalrymple, Mackay's group turned to the north-east, crossing the range into a coastal valley where after several days travel, they came upon a large river. They named this river the Mackay River after George Mackay, the father of John Mackay, but is now known as the Pioneer River. They followed the river north then east through open forested country before encountering large grassed plains in the region where the town of Mackay and its suburbs now stands. These plains, which were probably created by Aboriginal fire-stick farming, they named the May Plains as they came across them on 23 May 1860.

The run-hunters spent the next few weeks marking out their future properties on these plains and neighbouring tracts of land while local Aboriginals camped at a safe distance. In this time most of the group became very ill, with Duke dying on 15 June. The remaining members set out to return to Rockhampton and soon met up with the Dawson River pastoralist Andrew Scott who was travelling with Tom Ross, and survivor of the 1857 Hornet Bank massacre and future Native Police officer, William Fraser. This expanded group then travelled south to Dan Connor's fledgling Collaroy pastoral station and onto Rockhampton, where they arrived on 8 July. From here John Mackay took a steamship to Sydney and returned to Uralla.

John Mackay had marked out large tracts of land on the south bank of the Pioneer River for himself which he called the Greenmount and Cape Palmerston runs. Returning to the region in 1862 with a new venture partner in James Starr and 1200 head of cattle, Mackay faced insolvency within the first six months and was forced to sell out of these properties. His pastoral pursuits not being a financial success, Mackay changed his career focus to becoming a mariner.

== Blackbirding and South Sea trading ==
In 1865, Mackay obtained his master mariner licence and became Captain John Mackay. He travelled to China during that year looking for opportunities to transport Chinese labour to Queensland. From 1867, Mackay was the master of the Sir Isaac Newton schooner. Under his command, the schooner regularly conducted blackbirding voyages to the Pacific Islands. Blackbirding was the practise of coercing and kidnapping South Sea Islanders to work as forced labourers on farms in New South Wales, Queensland and Fiji. By the early 1870s, Mackay in the Sir Isaac Newton diversified into transporting goods such as coffee and cedar into Australian ports from as far away as Ceylon. It is highly possible that he was the captain of the Albert Edward vessel that the Manbarra people of Palm Island in Queensland attempted to destroy in 1874.

In 1875, Mackay became master of the Flora and continued blackbirding throughout the Pacific. In 1876, Mackay was undertaking voyages from the Mariana Islands to Sydney. From 1877 to 1880, it appears that Mackay conducted lengthy trading voyages, travelling as far as Tahiti, Chile and the western coast of the United States of America. In 1879, Mackay took command of the Meg Merrilies schooner which coasted largely between ports in Fiji and New Zealand, and in 1881 he took charge of the steamer The Southern Cross which plied a similar course. In 1883, he returned to Queensland to take up a grant of land which he believed the government had offered to him for his services of opening the region around the Pioneer River for British colonisation. However, the Government of Queensland reneged on this agreement and instead offered Mackay the position of harbourmaster in the northern port of Cooktown.

There was another blackbirder by the name of Captain John Mackay who operated out of Queensland ports in the period slightly after the subject of this article had retired from his seafaring position. This was Captain John Ronald Mackay who was in command of the vessel Para. His exploits in islander labour recruitment were similar but should not be confused with the John Mackay presented here.

== Harbourmaster at Cooktown and Brisbane ==
In 1883, Mackay was appointed as harbourmaster for the port of Cooktown. In 1889, he became harbourmaster at Brisbane.

== Death and legacy ==
Mackay died in 1914 at St Helen's Hospital, South Brisbane and was buried in Balmoral Cemetery. He was married to Marion McLennan and had two sons and two daughters. One of his sons was Rainey Hugh Mackay who was a soldier for the British Empire in World War I and who owned large acreages of land in Brisbane which was later subdivided into the suburbs of Salisbury and Moorooka.

The city of Mackay is named after him.
