= Mackay (suburb), Queensland =

Central suburb of the City of Mackay, Australia

Mackay
- Suburb
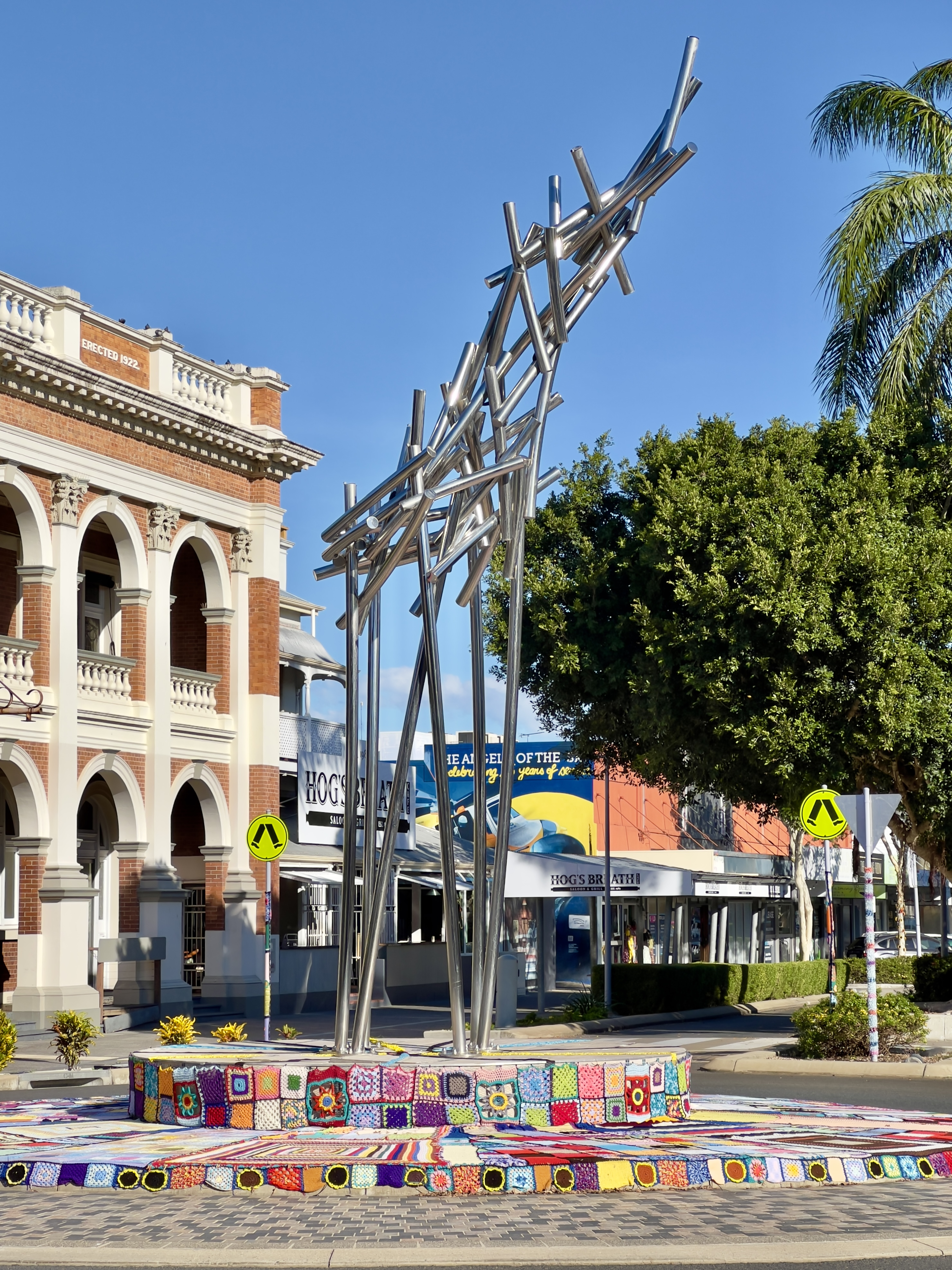
- Cane Fire sculpture in front of the former Queensland National Bank, 2023

- Interactive map of Mackay
- Coordinates: 21.1447°S 149.1819°E
- Country: Australia
- State: Queensland
- City: Mackay
- LGA: Mackay Region
- Location: 336 km (209 mi) NNW of Rockhampton; 387 km (240 mi) SE of Townsville; 966 km (600 mi) NNW of Brisbane

Government
  - State electorate: Mackay
  - Federal division: Dawson

Area
  - Total: 4.4 km^{2} (1.7 sq mi)

Population
  - Total: 4,026 (2021 census)
  - Density: 915/km^{2} (2,370/sq mi)
- Time zone: UTC+10:00 (AEST)
- Postcode: 4740
Suburbs around Mackay
Mount Pleasant	North Mackay	Cremorne
West Mackay	Mackay	East Mackay
West Mackay	South Mackay	East Mackay

Mackay is the central suburb and the central business district of the City of Mackay in the Mackay Region, Queensland, Australia. In the 2021 census, the suburb of Mackay had a population of 4,026 people.

== Geography ==
Kemmis is a neighbourhood at the southern edge of the suburb (21.15°S 149.1833°E). It was the location of the former Kemmis railway station (21.1506°S 149.1788°E) on the North Coast railway line until the line was diverted to avoid the city centre.

== History ==
The suburb takes its name from the town, which in turn was named after explorer John Mackay, who led an 1860 expedition into the Pioneer Valley.

The name Kemmis refers to Arthur Kemmis, a member of William Landsborough's 1861 expedition from the Gulf of Carpentaria to Melbourne in search of the Burke and Wills expedition. Kemmis was a partner in the lease of Fort Cooper pastoral run.

Mackay Primary School opened on 12 December 1871. Between 1872 and 1877, it was known as Port Mackay Primary School before becoming Mackay Primary School again. On 28 September 1885, the school was separated into Mackay Boys State School and Mackay Girls and Infants State School. The two schools were amalgamated again on 11 July 1932 to form Mackay Central State School.

The original Mackay station opened in 1885 in Tennyson Street. In 1924, it was relocated to Boddington Street (21.1488°S 149.1821°E). In the 1990s, the rail bridge over the Pioneer River needed to be replaced, which presented an opportunity for re-alignment of the railway line to bypass the Mackay CBD. In 1994, the new alignment opened with the new Mackay railway station in the outer suburb of Paget.

St Patrick's College opened on 22 September 1929.

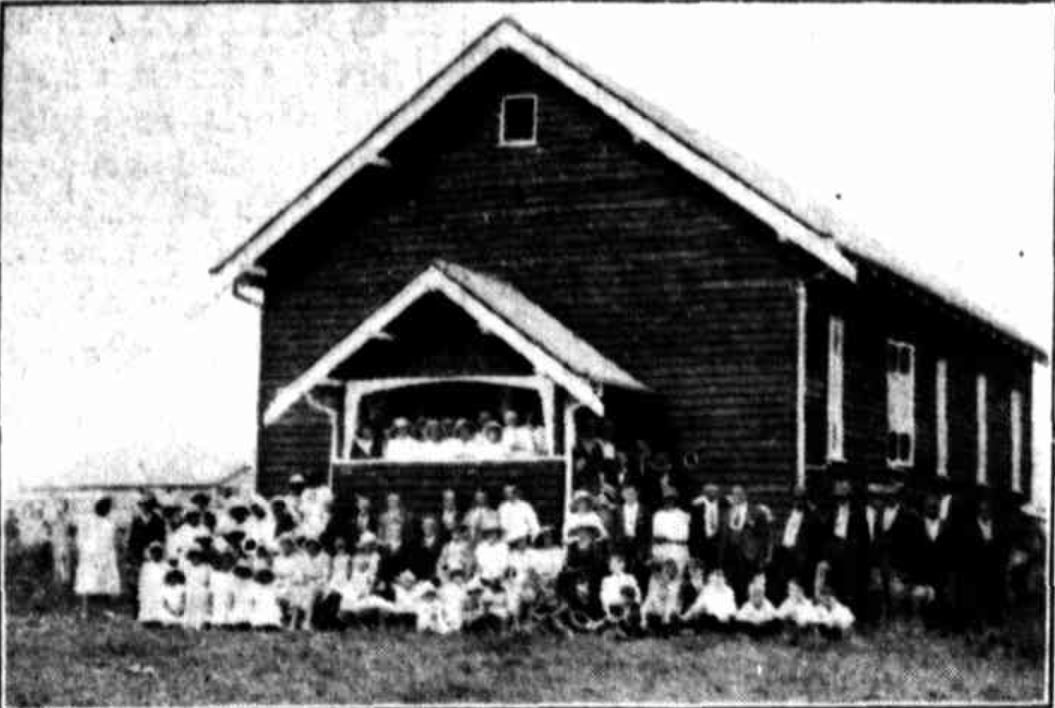
Central Mackay Seventh-Day Adventist Church on opening, 31 March 1935

The Central Mackay Seventh-Day Adventist Church opened at 89 Milton Street on Sunday 31 March 1935.

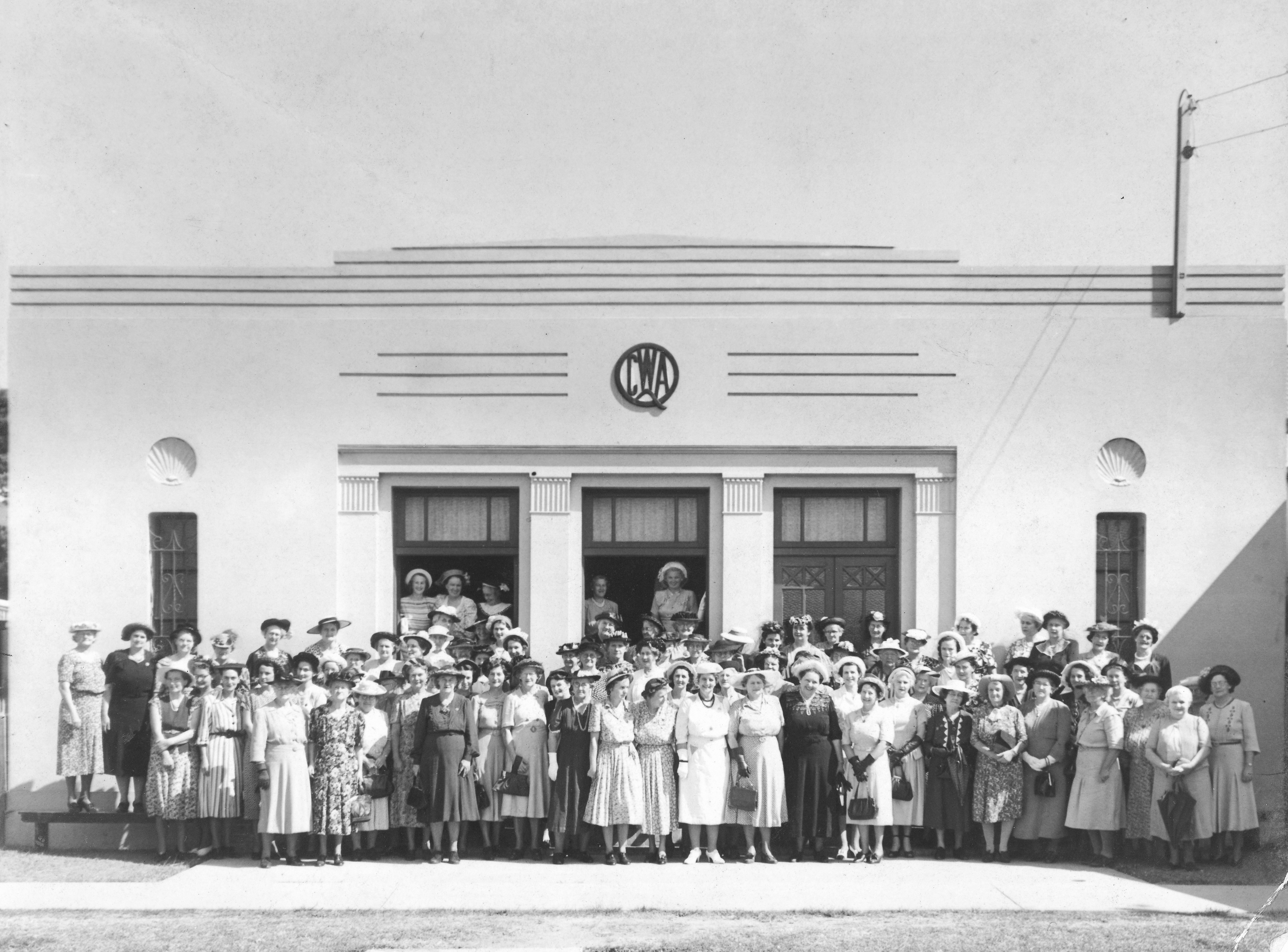
The State Conference of the Queensland Country Women's Association held in Mackay in 1954 at the Mackay Branch of the QCWA Rooms at 43 Gordon Street, Mackay.

Although Maltese immigrants came to the Mackay area as early as 1883, it was not until in 1944 when Australia's immigration policy was changed to recognise Maltese people as "white British subjects" (and hence acceptable as immigrants under the White Australia policy) that significant numbers of Maltese immigrated to Australia. Many of the Maltese immigrants to Queensland came to Mackay to work in the sugarcane fields and later purchased sugarcane plantations of their own. In 2021, the Mackay Regional Council gave approval for the Maltese community to erect bronze statues of 3 Maltese men sitting on the corner of Victoria and Wood Streets (a popular meeting place for the Maltese community). The statues will be based on a 1994 photo, which is currently in a plaque at the site. The statues are expected to be completed by April 2024.

Mackay Opportunity School opened in 1960. On 29 August 1981, it was renamed Mackay Special School. It closed on 7 May 1997.

Kutta Mulla Gorinna Special Assistance School opened in 2018.

== Demographics ==
In the 2016 census, the suburb of Mackay had a population of 3,659 people.

In the 2021 census, the suburb of Mackay had a population of 4,026 people.

== Education ==
Mackay Central State School is a government primary (Prep–6) school for boys and girls at 251 Alfred Street (21.1454°S 149.1815°E). In 2018, the school had an enrolment of 177 students with 11 teachers and 9 non-teaching staff (5 full-time equivalent).

St Patrick's College is a Catholic secondary (11–12) school for boys and girls at Gregory Street (21.1392°S 149.1847°E). In 2018, the school had an enrolment of 442 students with 37 teachers (36 full-time equivalent) and 24 non-teaching staff (19 full-time equivalent).

Kutta Mulla Gorinna Special Assistance School is a private secondary school for students who are vulnerable and disengaged from the conventional school system. It is open to all such students, but has particular emphasis on support for Aboriginal and Torres Strait Islander students.

There is no government secondary school in the central suburb of Mackay. The nearest is Mackay State High School in neighbouring South Mackay to the south.
