= City of Mackay =

Coordinates: 21°08′28.31″S 149°11′08.26″E

- Local government area
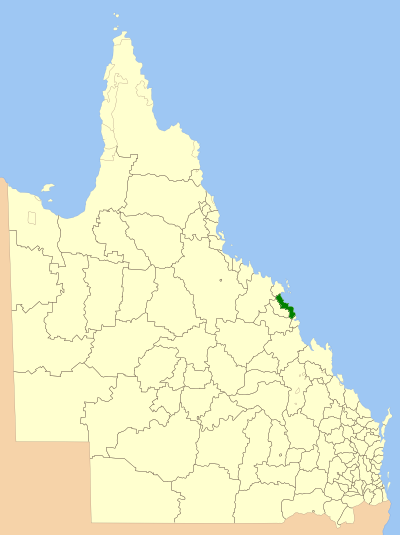
- Location within Queensland

- Country: Australia
- State: Queensland
- Region: Central Queensland
- Established: 1869
- Council seat: Mackay

Area
  - Total: 2,897.5 km^{2} (1,118.7 sq mi)

Population
  - Total: 84,890 (2006)
  - Density: 29.2977/km^{2} (75.881/sq mi)
- Website: City of Mackay
LGAs around City of Mackay
Bowen	Whitsunday	Pacific Ocean
Mirani	City of Mackay	Pacific Ocean
Nebo	Sarina	Pacific Ocean

The City of Mackay was a local government area located in the Central Queensland region of Queensland, Australia, encompassing the regional city of Mackay and the surrounding region. The city was created as a municipal borough in 1869, and prior to amalgamation with the Shire of Pioneer in 1994, the city was limited to the central suburbs on the south shore of the Pioneer River. From 1994 until 2008, the City covered an area of 2,897.5 square kilometres (1,118.7 sq mi). In 2008, it amalgamated with the Shires of Mirani and Sarina to become the Mackay Regional Council.

== History ==
The Borough of Mackay was proclaimed on 22 September 1869 under the Municipal Institutions Act 1864. The Pioneer Division was established on 11 November 1879 as one of 74 founding divisions under the Divisional Boards Act 1879.

Initially the council meetings were held in the Court House in River Street, the Post and Telegraph office in Wood Street, and in a building on Sydney Street owned by Mr R. Fleming. The first town hall was a timber structure constructed in 1872 on land that the council purchased at 63 Sydney Street.

With the passage of the Local Authorities Act 1902, Pioneer Division became the Shire of Pioneer and Mackay became Town of Mackay on 31 March 1903. Mackay received City status on 17 August 1918.

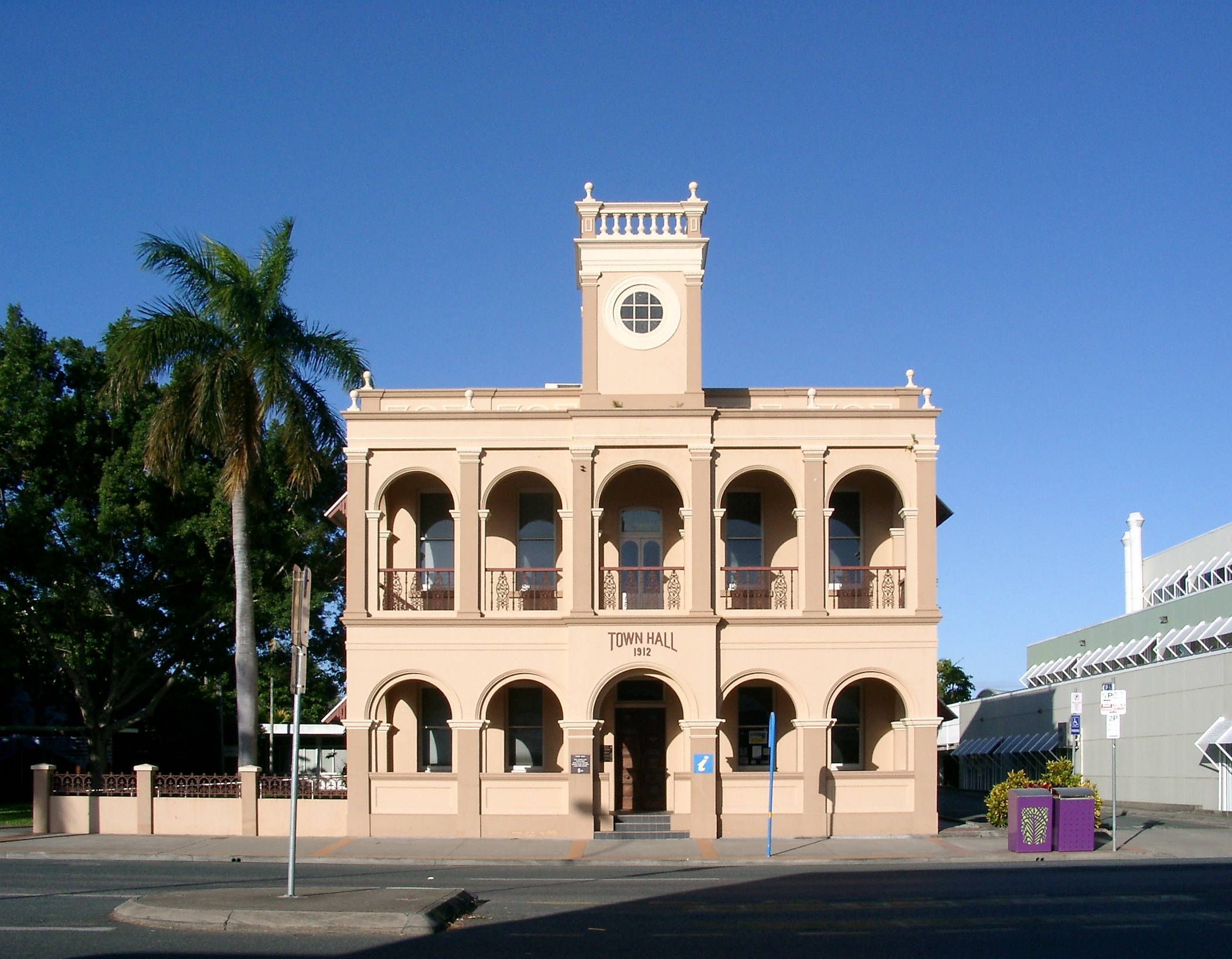
Second Mackay Town Hall, built in 1912, as seen in 2008

During the boom in sugar prices, the borough council decided in 1884 that a larger town hall was needed. However, it was not until 1909 that they decided to proceed with a brick building on the site of the existing town hall in Sydney Street. The council held a design competition, which was won by a local architect and engineer Arthur Rigby. The first town hall was moved to the rear of the block to be behind the new building. The first official Council meeting was held in the (now heritage-listed) second town hall on 19 October 1912 with the official opening the next day.

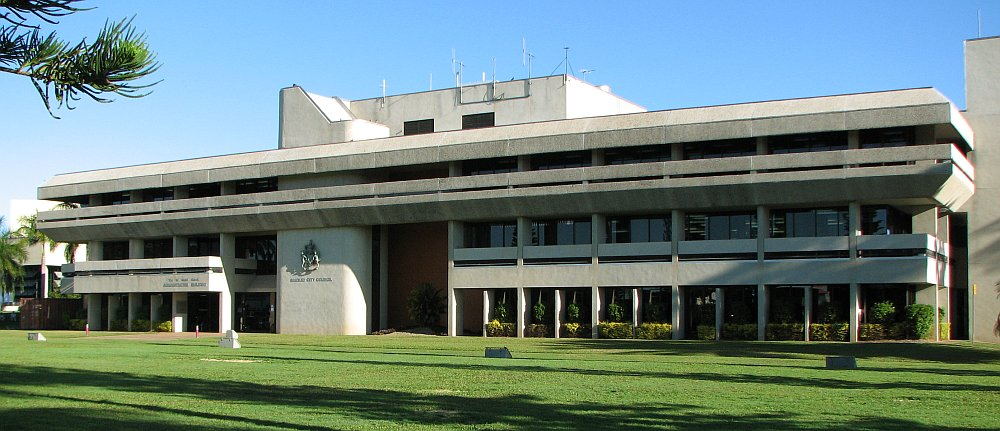
Mackay Civic Administration Building, Gordon Street, Mackay

After the council moved into their new Civic Administration Centre in 1974, they proposed to demolish the town hall and sell off the land to defray the costs of the new civic centre. However, following public protest, they renovated the building to make it available for community purposes.

On 21 November 1991, the Electoral and Administrative Review Commission, created two years earlier, produced its second report, and recommended that local government boundaries in the Mackay area be rationalised. The Local Government (Mackay and Pioneer) Regulation 1993 was gazetted on 17 December 1993, and on 30 March 1994, the two amalgamated into a larger City of Mackay, which first met on 8 April 1994.

On 15 March 2008, under the Local Government (Reform Implementation) Act 2007 passed by the Parliament of Queensland on 10 August 2007, the City of Mackay merged with the Shires of Mirani and Sarina to form the Mackay Regional Council.

== Towns and localities ==
Prior to 1994, Mackay consisted of the suburbs of North Mackay, West Mackay, South Mackay and East Mackay.

All other suburbs of Mackay belonged into the defunct Shire of Pioneer.

After the amalgamation, the City of Mackay included the following settlements:

Suburbs:

- Mackay:
  - North Mackay
  - East Mackay
  - West Mackay
  - South Mackay
- Andergrove
- Beaconsfield
- Blacks Beach
- Bucasia
- Cremorne
- Dolphin Heads
- Eimeo
- Erakala
- Foulden
- Glenella
- Mackay Harbour
- Mount Pleasant
- Nindaroo
- Ooralea
- Paget
- Racecourse
- Richmond
- Rural View
- Shoal Point
- Slade Point
- Te Kowai

Towns:

- Bakers Creek
- Ball Bay
- Brampton Island
- Calen
- Dalrymple Bay
- Farleigh
- Halliday Bay
- Hampden
- Kuttabul
- Laguna Quays
- Lindeman Island
- McEwens Beach
- Midge Point
- Mount Ossa
- Oakenden
- Pindi Pindi
- Seaforth
- St Helens Beach
- Walkerston

National Parks:

- Cape Hillsborough NP
- Eungella NP
- Mount Jukes NP
- Mount Martin NP
- Mount Ossa NP
- Pioneer Peaks NP
- Reliance Creek NP

Other localities:

- Alexandra
- Balberra
- Balnagowan
- Belmunda
- Bloomsbury
- Chelona
- Dumbleton
- Dunnrock
- Greenmount
- Habana
- Homebush
- Mentmore
- Mount Charlton
- Mount Pelion
- Palmyra
- Pleystowe
- Rosella
- Sandiford
- Sunnyside
- The Leap
- Victoria Plains
- Yalboroo

== Mayors ==
- 1869–1871: David Hay Dalrymple
- 1872: Alexander Shiels
- 1873: George Smith
- 1873–1874: David Hay Dalrymple (second term)
- 1875–1876: George Smith
- 1876–1877: Korah H. Wills
- 1878: William Marsh
- 1879: Charles R. Dutallis
- 1880: William Paxton
- 1881: George Smith (second term)
- 1882: Edmund S. Rawson
- 1883: Thomas Pearce
- 1884: Michael J. Fay
- 1885: John Harney
- 1886: George Dimmock
- 1887: Archibald McIntyre
- 1888: Henry Lindesay Black
- 1889: W. Robertson
- 1890: W.G. Hodges
- 1891: W.J. Byrne
- 1891: Henry B. Black
- 1892: Alexander Pine
- 1893: N.C. Morthensen
- 1894: G. Dimmock
- 1895: Henry B. Black
- 1895/6?: P.M. Hynes
- 1896: W.G. Hodges
- 1897: Henry B. Black
- 1898: J.H. Thornber
- 1899: Samuel Lambert
- 1900: C. Morley
- 1901: W.G. Hodges
- 1902: Cecil Garcia Smith
- 1903: C.P. Ready
- 1904–1906: Thomas Chataway
- 1907: Alexander J. McLean
- 1908: C.R. Klugh
- 1909: E.J. Marryatt
- 1910–1911: James Christie
- 1912: Hans Ditley Petersen
- 1913: C.P. Ready
- 1914–1915: George B. Fay
- 1916: V. Macrossan
- 1917–1918: James Prout Moule (died 1 June 1918)
- 1918: William Crawford Weir (resigned to become Town Clerk in November 1918)
- 1918: Robert Hague
- 1919: Arthur Hucker
- 1920: George M. Cameron
- 1921–1924: A.F. Williams
- 1924–1927?: George A. Milton
- 1924–1927?: Lewis Windermere Nott
- 1927–1930: George A. Milton
- 1930–1933: Ian A.C. Wood
- 1933–1934: J.M. Mulherin
- 1934–1939: George Moody
- 1939–1952: Ian A.C. Wood
- 1952–1967: John (Jack) Binnington
- 1967–1970: Ian A.C. Wood
- 1970–1988: Albert F. Abbott
- 1988–1991: Peter J. Jardine
- 1991–1994: Gregory R. Williamson

Amalgamation of Mackay City and Pioneer Shire Councils

- 1994–1997: Gordon White, prior to the amalgamation with Pioneer Shire, White had been chairman of the Pioneer Shire Council (1983–1994)
- 1997–2008: Julie Boyd

Amalgamation of Mackay City Sarina Shire and Mirani Shire Councils

- 2008–2012: Colin Meng
- 2012–2016: Dierdre Comerford
- 2016 - : Gregory R. Williamson

== Town Clerks ==
The town clerks of the City of Mackay were:

- 1869–1871: Thomas Purves
- 1871–1872: M.J. Fay
- 1872: R.W. Smith
- 1872: A.M. Rheuben
- 1872: J. Rutherford
- 1872–1873: A.M Rheuben
- 1873–1875: H.F. Morgan
- 1876–1881: J.C. Binney
- 1881–1883 : F.N. Beddek
- 1883–1886: W.G. Hodges
- 1886–1890: C. Davie
- 1891: G. Dimmock
- 1892–1895: C. Davie
- 1895–1901: G. Dimmock
- 1902: James H. Tornber (died 29 December 1902)
- 1903–1915: Fred Morley
- 1916–1918: Arthur Fadden
- 1918–1943: William Crawford Weir
- 1944–1957: S. Murray
- 1957–1980: L.A. Payne
- 1980–1994: S.B. Fursman
- 1994–1997: T.P. Crompton
- 1997-before 2000: R.C. Bain
- before 2000-before 2004: J. Harris
- before 2004–2008: K. Gouldthorp

== Transport ==
- Mackay Airport
- North Coast railway line, Mackay Station
- Bruce Highway

== Sister cities ==
- Matsuura, Japan (Nagasaki Prefecture)

== Population ==
Year	Population (Mackay)	Population (Pioneer)	Population (Total)
1933	10,665	9,926	20591
1947	13,486	11,606	25092
1954	14,762	14,316	29,078
1961	16,809	15,741	32,550
1966	18,640	19,900	38,540
1971	19,148	22,561	41,709
1976	20,224	26,938	47,162
1981	20,664	33,732	54,396
1986	22,199	36,084	58,283
1991	23,052	40,614	63,666
1996			71,894
2001			75,020
2006	20,803	85,399	
2015			120,000
