= Shire of Pioneer =

Coordinates: 21°08′37.55″S 149°11′04.9″E

- Local government area
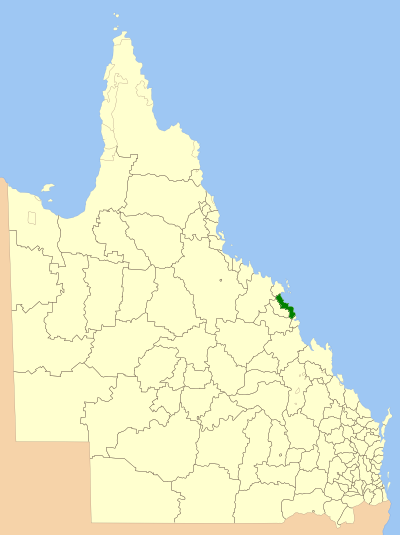
- Location within Queensland
- Country: Australia
- State: Queensland
- Region: North Queensland
- Established: 1879
- Abolished: 1994
- Council seat: Mackay

Area
  - Total: 2,820.1 km^{2} (1,088.8 sq mi)

Population
  - Total: 40,614 (1991 census)
  - Density: 14.4016/km^{2} (37.3000/sq mi)
LGAs around Shire of Pioneer
Bowen	Whitsunday	Pacific Ocean
Mirani	Shire of Pioneer	City of Mackay
Nebo	Sarina	Pacific Ocean

The Shire of Pioneer was a local government area surrounding the city of Mackay and including all but its innermost suburbs. The shire, administered from Mackay itself, covered an area of 2,820.1 square kilometres (1,088.8 sq mi), and existed as a local government entity from 1879 until 1994, when it was dissolved and amalgamated with City of Mackay.

== History ==
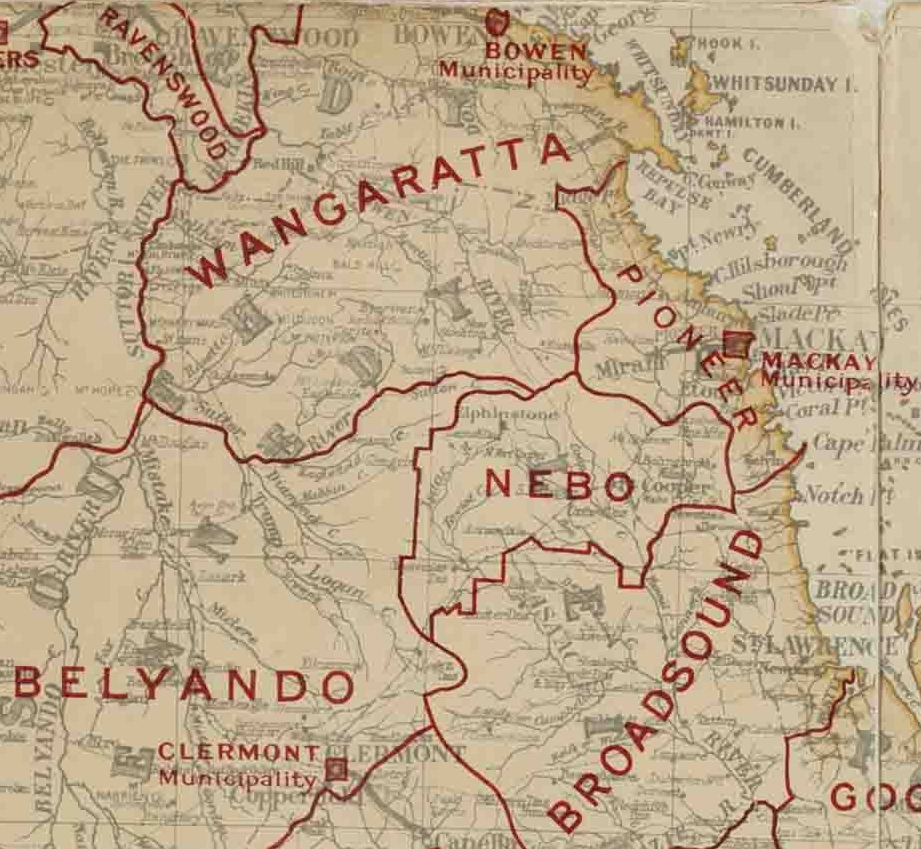
Map of Pioneer Division and adjacent local government areas, March 1902

The Borough of Mackay was proclaimed on 22 September 1869 under the Municipal Institutions Act 1864. Pioneer Division was one of the 74 divisional boards established on 11 November 1879 under the Divisional Boards Act 1879 with a population of 2884 and covered the region surrounding but not including the Borough of Mackay.

With the passage of the Local Authorities Act 1902, Pioneer Division became the Shire of Pioneer on 31 March 1903. The Pioneer Shire Council Chambers at 1 Wood Street, Mackay, were constructed in 1935 and are now listed on the Queensland Heritage Register.

The Shire of Sarina was established from the southern part of the Shire of Pioneer on 1 January 1912 under the Local Authorities Act 1902.

The Shire of Mirani was established from part of the Shire of Pioneer on 4 September 1913 under the Local Authorities Act 1902.

On 21 November 1991, the Electoral and Administrative Review Commission, created two years earlier, produced its second report, and recommended that local government boundaries in the Mackay area be rationalised. The Local Government (Mackay and Pioneer) Regulation 1993 was gazetted on 17 December 1993, and on 30 March 1994, the Shire ceased to exist and was merged with the City of Mackay. Gordon White, who had served as chairman of Pioneer since 1983, won the resulting mayoral elections and was then mayor of the City of Mackay until 1994.

== Towns and localities ==
Suburbs:

- Andergrove
- Beaconsfield
- Blacks Beach
- Bucasia
- Cremorne
- Dolphin Heads
- Eimeo
- Erakala
- Foulden
- Glenella
- Mackay Harbour
- Mount Pleasant
- Nindaroo
- North Mackay
- Ooralea
- Paget
- Racecourse
- Richmond
- Rural View
- Shoal Point
- Slade Point

Towns:

- Bakers Creek
- Ball Bay
- Brampton Island
- Calen
- Farleigh
- Halliday Bay
- Hampden
- Kuttabul
- Laguna Quays
- Lindeman Island
- McEwens Beach
- Midge Point
- Mount Ossa
- Oakenden
- Pindi Pindi
- Seaforth
- St Helens Beach
- Walkerston

National Parks:

- Cape Hillsborough NP
- Eungella NP
- Mount Jukes NP
- Mount Martin NP
- Mount Ossa NP
- Pioneer Peaks NP
- Reliance Creek NP

Other localities:

- Alexandra
- Balberra
- Balnagowan
- Belmunda
- Bloomsbury
- Chelona
- Dumbleton
- Dunnrock
- Greenmount
- Habana
- Homebush
- Mentmore
- Mount Charlton
- Mount Pelion
- Munbura
- Palmyra
- Pleystowe
- Rosella
- Sandiford
- Sunnyside
- Te Kowai
- The Leap
- Victoria Plains
- Yalboroo

== Chairmen ==
- 1885–1890:Walter Paget
- 1901: Walter Paget
- 1927: William Henry Kirkup
- 1934–1947: Ernie Evans
- 1955–1957: Ernie Evans
- 1983–1994: Gordon White, who continued as mayor of City of Mackay after the amalgamation until 1999.

== Population ==
Year	Population
1933	9,926
1947	11,606
1954	14,316
1961	15,741
1966	19,900
1971	22,561
1976	26,938
1981	33,732
1986	36,084
1991	40,614
