= Mackay Region =

- Local government area
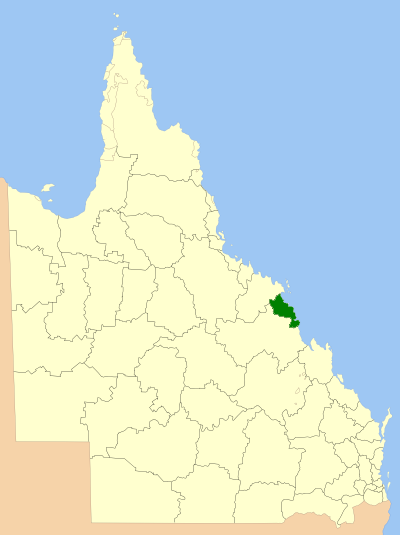
- Location within Queensland

- Interactive map of Mackay Region
- Coordinates: 21°08′28″S 149°11′08″E
- Country: Australia
- State: Queensland
- Region: North Queensland
- Established: 2008
- Council seat: Mackay

Government
  - Mayor: Greg Williamson
  - State electorates: Mackay; Mirani; Whitsunday
  - Federal divisions: Dawson; Capricornia

Area
  - Total: 7,622 km^{2} (2,943 sq mi)

Population
  - Total: 121,691 (2021 census)
  - Density: 15.9658/km^{2} (41.3511/sq mi)
- Website: Mackay Region
LGAs around Mackay Region
Whitsunday	Whitsunday	Coral Sea
Whitsunday	Mackay Region	Coral Sea
Isaac	Isaac	Isaac

The Mackay Region is a local government area located in North Queensland, Queensland, Australia. Established in 2008, it was preceded by three previous local government areas with modern histories extending back as far as 1869.

It has an estimated operating budget of A$118 million.

In the 2021 census, the Mackay Region had a population of 121,691 people.

== History ==
Yuwibara (also known as Yuibera, Yuri, Juipera, Yuwiburra) is an Australian Aboriginal language spoken on Yuwibara country. It is closely related to the Biri languages/dialects. The Yuwibara language region includes the landscape within the local government boundaries of the Mackay Region.

Prior to 2008, the Mackay Region was an entire area of three previous and distinct local government areas:

- the City of Mackay;
- the Shire of Mirani; and,
- the Shire of Sarina.

The city had its beginning in the Mackay Municipality which was proclaimed on 22 September 1869 under the Municipal Institutions Act 1864. Its first mayor was David Dalrymple, and the council first met on 1 December 1869. It achieved a measure of autonomy in 1878 with the enactment of the Local Government Act. With the passage of the Local Authorities Act 1902, Mackay became a Town on 31 March 1903, and was ultimately proclaimed a City on 17 August 1918.

On 11 December 1879, the Pioneer Division came into being as one of Queensland's 74 divisions created under the Divisional Boards Act 1879 on 11 November 1879, chaired by John Ewen Davidson. On 31 March 1903, Pioneer became a Shire. Two areas split away from it over the next decade; the Shire of Sarina on 1 January 1912, and the Shire of Mirani on 4 September 1913.

On 21 November 1991, the Electoral and Administrative Review Commission, created two years earlier, produced its second report, and recommended that local government boundaries in the Mackay area be rationalised. The Local Government (Mackay and Pioneer) Regulation 1993 was gazetted on 17 December 1993, and on 30 March 1994, the two amalgamated into a larger City of Mackay, which first met on 8 April 1994.

=== Mackay Region ===
In July 2007, the Local Government Reform Commission released a report making recommendations for statewide reform of local government boundaries, and recommended that the three areas of Mackay, Mirani and Sarina amalgamate, due mainly to Mackay's role as a regional centre and all three shires' involvement in sugar production. The City of Mackay endorsed the suggestion, but the two shires proposed alternative options. In the end, the commission's proposal was unchanged. On 15 March 2008, the City and Shires formally ceased to exist, and elections were held on the same day to elect councillors and a mayor to the Regional Council.

== Mayors ==
- 2000–present: Gregory Roy Williamson

== Council ==
Mackay Regional Council

Leadership
- Mayor: Greg Williamson, Team Greg Williamson
- Deputy Mayor: Karen May, Team Greg Williamson
- Seats: 11 elected representatives, including a mayor and 10 councillors

Elections
- Last election: 16 March 2024

Mackay Regional Council is unsubdivided, meaning it does not have any wards. The mayor is directly-elected.

The incumbent mayor, Greg Williamson, formed the Greg Williamson Alliance ahead of the 2016 election, with six members of the group re-elected in 2020.

In 2023, four councillors left the group, and in 2024 Team Greg Williamson was formed with the stated aim of "creat[ing] a progressive, modern council".

=== Current composition ===
The current council, elected in 2024, is:

Position	Councillor	Party
Mayor	Greg Williamson	Team Greg Williamson
Councillor	Karen May	Team Greg Williamson
Councillor	Martin Bella	Independent
Councillor	Anne Baker	Independent Labor
Councillor	Namarca Corowa	Mackay First
Councillor	Peter Sheedy	Independent
Councillor	Belinda Hassan	Independent Labor
Councillor	Allison Jones	Independent Labor
Councillor	Ash-Lee Johnson	Team Greg Williamson
Councillor	Nathenea MacRae	Mackay First
Councillor	Heath Paton	Mackay First

== Past councillors ==
=== 2020−present ===
Year	Councillor	Councillor	Councillor	Councillor	Councillor	Councillor	Councillor	Councillor	Councillor	Councillor
2020	Karen May (Williamson Alliance/Team Williamson)	Martin Bella (Ind/Ind. LNP/Ind)	Laurence Bonaventura (Ind.)	Justin Englert (Williamson Alliance/Ind.)	Michelle Green (Williamson Alliance/Team Williamson)	Belinda Hassan (Williamson Alliance/Ind. Labor)	Alison Jones (Ind.)	Fran Mann (Williamson Alliance/Ind. Labor)	Russell Seymour (Ind.)	Pauline Townsend (Williamson Alliance/Ind.)
2021	Karen May (Williamson Alliance/Team Williamson)	Martin Bella (Ind/Ind. LNP/Ind)	Laurence Bonaventura (Ind.)	Justin Englert (Williamson Alliance/Ind.)	Michelle Green (Williamson Alliance/Team Williamson)	Belinda Hassan (Williamson Alliance/Ind. Labor)	Alison Jones (Ind.)	Fran Mann (Williamson Alliance/Ind. Labor)	Russell Seymour (Ind.)	Pauline Townsend (Williamson Alliance/Ind.)
2022	Karen May (Williamson Alliance/Team Williamson)	Martin Bella (Ind/Ind. LNP/Ind)	Laurence Bonaventura (Ind.)	Justin Englert (Williamson Alliance/Ind.)	Michelle Green (Williamson Alliance/Team Williamson)	Belinda Hassan (Williamson Alliance/Ind. Labor)	Alison Jones (Ind.)	Fran Mann (Williamson Alliance/Ind. Labor)	Russell Seymour (Ind.)	Pauline Townsend (Williamson Alliance/Ind.)
2023	Karen May (Williamson Alliance/Team Williamson)	Martin Bella (Ind/Ind. LNP/Ind)	Laurence Bonaventura (Ind.)	Justin Englert (Williamson Alliance/Ind.)	Michelle Green (Williamson Alliance/Team Williamson)	Belinda Hassan (Williamson Alliance/Ind. Labor)	Alison Jones (Ind.)	Fran Mann (Williamson Alliance/Ind. Labor)	Russell Seymour (Ind.)	Pauline Townsend (Williamson Alliance/Ind.)
2024	Karen May (Williamson Alliance/Team Williamson)	Martin Bella (Ind/Ind. LNP/Ind)	Laurence Bonaventura (Ind.)	Justin Englert (Williamson Alliance/Ind.)	Michelle Green (Williamson Alliance/Team Williamson)	Belinda Hassan (Williamson Alliance/Ind. Labor)	Alison Jones (Ind.)	Fran Mann (Williamson Alliance/Ind. Labor)	Russell Seymour (Ind.)	Pauline Townsend (Williamson Alliance/Ind.)
2024	Karen May (Williamson Alliance/Team Williamson)	Martin Bella (Ind/Ind. LNP/Ind)	George Christensen (Mackay First)	Namarca Corowa (Mackay First)	Peter Sheedy (Ind.)	Belinda Hassan (Williamson Alliance/Ind. Labor)	Alison Jones (Ind.)	Ash-Lee Johnson (Team Williamson)	Nathenea MacRae (Mackay First)	Heath Paton (Mackay First)

== Election results ==
=== 2024 ===
2024 Queensland local elections: Mackay
Party	Candidate	Votes	%	±%
Independent Labor	Belinda Hassan (elected)	26,376	4.16	
Mackay First	George Christensen (elected)	25,556	4.03	
Mackay First	Namarca Corowa (elected)	25,440	4.01	
Independent	Martin Bella (elected)	25,364	4.00	
Independent	Peter Sheedy (elected)	25,118	3.96	
Team Greg Williamson	Ash-Lee Johnson (elected)	24,404	3.85	
Independent	Alison Jones (elected)	24,399	3.84	
Mackay First	Nathenea MacRae (elected)	24,149	3.80	
Mackay First	Heath Paton (elected)	24,084	3.79	
Team Greg Williamson	Karen May (elected)	24,000	3.78	
Team Greg Williamson	Michelle Green	23,941	3.77	
Independent	Pauline Townsend	23,601	3.72	
Mackay First	Melissa Fowler	23,486	3.70	
Independent Labor	Fran Mann	23,118	3.64	
Mackay First	Keith Hicks	22,705	3.58	
Mackay First	Jeff Keioskie	22,390	3.53	
Mackay First	Kylee Stanton	22,274	3.51	
Mackay First	Ian Christensen	21,831	3.44	
Team Greg Williamson	Neil Wallace	21,730	3.42	
Mackay First	Lindsay Temple	21,222	3.34	
Independent	Justin Englert	19,432	3.06	
Independent	Greg Fisher	19,076	3.01	
Team Greg Williamson	Peter Freeleagus	18,902	2.98	
Independent	Russell Seymour	18,063	2.85	
Independent	Kimberly Doyle	17,805	2.81	
Team Greg Williamson	Stephen Cutting	17,792	2.80	
Independent	Les Scott	17,462	2.75	
Team Greg Williamson	Joshua Thornton	17,370	2.74	
Independent LNP	Ian Rowan	13,580	2.14	
Turnout		73,008	82.16	
Party total votes
Mackay First		233,137	36.73	+36.73
Independent		190,320	29.98	
Team Greg Williamson		148,139	23.34	
Independent Labor		49,494	7.80	
Independent LNP		13,580	2.14	
Party total seats			Seats	±
Mackay First			4	▲4
Independent			3	▼1
Team Greg Williamson			2	▼4
Independent Labor			1	▲1

- Team Greg Williamson changed compared with Greg Williamson Alliance at 2020 election.
- Belinda Hassan was elected as Greg Williamson Alliance but became Independent Labor in December 2023.
- Fran Mann was elected as Greg Williamson Alliance but became Independent Labor in December 2023.
- Justin Englert was elected as Greg Williamson Alliance but became independent in December 2023.
- Pauline Townsend was elected as Greg Williamson Alliance but became independent in December 2023.

== Settlements ==
The Mackay Region includes the following settlements:

=== Suburbs ===
- Inner suburbs:
  - East Mackay
  - Mackay (city centre and CBD)
  - North Mackay
  - South Mackay
  - West Mackay
- Outer suburbs:
  - Andergrove
  - Beaconsfield
  - Blacks Beach
  - Bucasia
  - Cremorne
  - Dolphin Heads
  - Eimeo
  - Erakala
  - Foulden
  - Glenella
  - Mackay Harbour
  - Mount Pleasant
  - Nindaroo
  - Ooralea
  - Paget
  - Racecourse
  - Richmond
  - Rural View
  - Shoal Point
  - Slade Point
  - Te Kowai

=== Towns ===
- Bakers Creek
- Ball Bay
- Brampton Island
- Calen
- Farleigh
- Hampden
- Kuttabul
- Laguna Quays
- Lindeman Island
- McEwens Beach
- Midge Point
- Mount Ossa
- Oakenden
- Pindi Pindi
- Seaforth
- St Helens Beach
- Walkerston

=== Localities ===
- Alexandra
- Balberra
- Balnagowan
- Belmunda
- Bloomsbury
- Chelona
- Dumbleton
- Dunnrock
- Greenmount
- Habana
- Homebush
- Mentmore
- Mount Charlton
- Mount Pelion
- Palmyra
- Pleystowe
- Rosella
- Sandiford
- Sunnyside
- The Leap
- Victoria Plains
- Yalboroo

=== National Parks ===
- Cape Hillsborough NP
- Eungella NP
- Mount Jukes NP
- Mount Martin NP
- Mount Ossa NP
- Pioneer Peaks NP
- Reliance Creek NP

=== Mirani area ===
- Benholme (village)
- Brightly (locality)
- Crediton (village)
- Dalrymple Heights (village)
- Dows Creek (town)
- Eton (town)
- Eungella (village)
- Eungella Dam (locality)
- Finch Hatton (town)
- Gargett (town)
- Hazledean (village)
- Kinchant Dam (locality)
- Marian (town)
- Mirani (town)
- Mia Mia (village)
- Mount Martin (village)
- Netherdale (village)
- North Eton (locality)
- Owens Creek (village)
- Pinevale (village)
- Pinnacle (locality)
- Septimus (town)

=== Sarina area ===
- Alligator Creek (town)
- Armstrong Beach (town)
- Campwin Beach (town)
- Freshwater Point (town)
- Grasstree Beach (town)
- Half Tide (town)
- Hay Point (town)
- Koumala (town)
- Munbura (village)
- Sarina (town)
- Sarina Beach (town)
- Sarina Range (locality)

== Demographics ==
The population figures for each of the predecessor local government areas prior to the 2008 amalgamation:

Year	Total Region	Mackay	Pioneer	Mirani	Sarina
1933	28,124	10,665	9,926	4,412	3,121
1947	32,947	13,486	11,606	4,587	3,268
1954	37,924	14,762	14,316	5,056	3,790
1961	41,196	16,809	15,741	4,760	3,886
1966	48,580	18,640	19,900	5,379	4,611
1971	51,903	19,148	22,561	4,772	5,422
1976	57,903	20,224	26,938	4,889	5,852
1981	66,057	20,664	33,732	4,739	6,922
1986	70,674	22,199	36,084	4,854	7,537
1991	76,372	23,052	40,614	4,625	8,081
1996	86,376	71,894		5,088	9,394
2001	89,877	75,020		5,220	9,637
2006	101,525	85,450		5,406	10,720

The estimated population figures (official census population figures are in bold) for the amalgamated Mackay Region from 2008.

Year	Total Region Population	Change Since Previous Year	% Change Since Previous Year
2008	108,644	+2,618	+2.47%
2009	111,455	+2,811	+2.59%
2010	113,699	+2,244	+2.01%
**2011**	**112,798**	**-901**	**-0.79%**
2012	117,603	+4,805	+4.26%
2013	119,076	+1,473	+1.25%
2014	119,272	+196	+0.16%
2015	118,771	-501	-0.42%
**2016**	**114,969**	**-3,802**	**-3.20%**
2017	116,601	+1,632	+1.42%
2018	116,514	-87	-0.07%
2019	116,761	+247	+0.21%
2020	117,902	+1,141	+0.98%
**2021**	**121,691**	+3,789	+3.21%

== Services ==
The Mackay Regional Council operates libraries in Mackay, Mount Pleasant, Walkerston, Sarina and Mirani. A mobile library service visits the following districts on a fortnightly schedule: Yalboroo, Bloomsbury, Midge Point, Ball Bay, Seaforth, Koumala, Swayneville, Hay Point, St Helens Beach, Calen, Shoal Point, Oakenden, Habana, Blacks Beach, Slade Point, Hampden, Marian, Gargett, Finch Hatton, Homebush, Chelona, McEwens Beach and Bucasia.
