= Sarina Beach, Queensland =

Sarina Beach
- Town
- Interactive map of Sarina Beach
- Coordinates: 21.3886°S 149.3130°E
- Country: Australia
- State: Queensland
- LGA: Mackay Region
- Location: 10.1 km (6.3 mi) NE of Sarina; 36.3 km (22.6 mi) S of Mackay; 309 km (192 mi) NNW of Rockhampton; 940 km (580 mi) NNW of Brisbane

Government
  - State electorate: Mirani
  - Federal division: Capricornia

Area
  - Total: 17.4 km^{2} (6.7 sq mi)

Population
  - Total: 661 (2021 census)
  - Density: 37.99/km^{2} (98.4/sq mi)
- Time zone: UTC+10:00 (AEST)
- Postcode: 4737
Localities around Sarina Beach
Sarina	Grasstree Beach	Campwin Beach
Sarina	Sarina Beach	Coral Sea
Sarina	Freshwater Point	Coral Sea

Sarina Beach is a coastal town and locality in the Mackay Region, Queensland, Australia. In the 2021 census, the locality of Sarina Beach had a population of 661 people.

== Geography ==
The locality is bounded to east by the Coral Sea, to the south by the Sarina Inlet and Plane Creek, and to the west by the Goonyella railway line that carries coal from the Bowen Basin coalfields to Hay Point for shipping.

Praguelands railway station ion the Goonyella railway line is on the boundary of the localities of Sarina and Sarina Beach. (21.3959°S 149.2562°E).

Sarina Beach Road connects the town of Sarina to the south-east to the town of Sarah Beach on the east coast of the locality.

=== Coastal features ===
Sarina Beach has the following coastal features (from west to east):

- Biltofts Beach (21.3902°S 149.2763°E)
- Sarina Inlet (21.4030°S 149.2972°E)
- Point Salisbury (21.4004°S 149.3007°E)
- Johnsons Beach (21.3942°S 149.3033°E)
- Perpetua Point (21.3959°S 149.3126°E)
- Sarina Beach, the beach (21.3875°S 149.3135°E)

== History ==
The name ultimately derives the Sarina Inlet, believed to be named by surveyor William Charles Borlase Wilson from Greek mythology meaning enchantress.

The beach became popular with beachgoers in the late 1920s with the first house built in 1928 for Mrs Campbell senior, who established a business providing dressing room facilities.

== Demographics ==
In the 2016 census, the locality of Sarina Beach had a population of 607 people.

In the 2021 census, the locality of Sarina Beach had a population of 661 people.

== Education ==
There are no schools in Sarina Beach. The nearest government primary schools are Alligator Creek State School in Alligator Creek to the north-west and Sarina State School in neighbouring Sarina to the south-east. The nearest government secondary school is Sarina State High School also in Sarina.
