= Sarina Range, Queensland =

Sarina Range
- Suburb
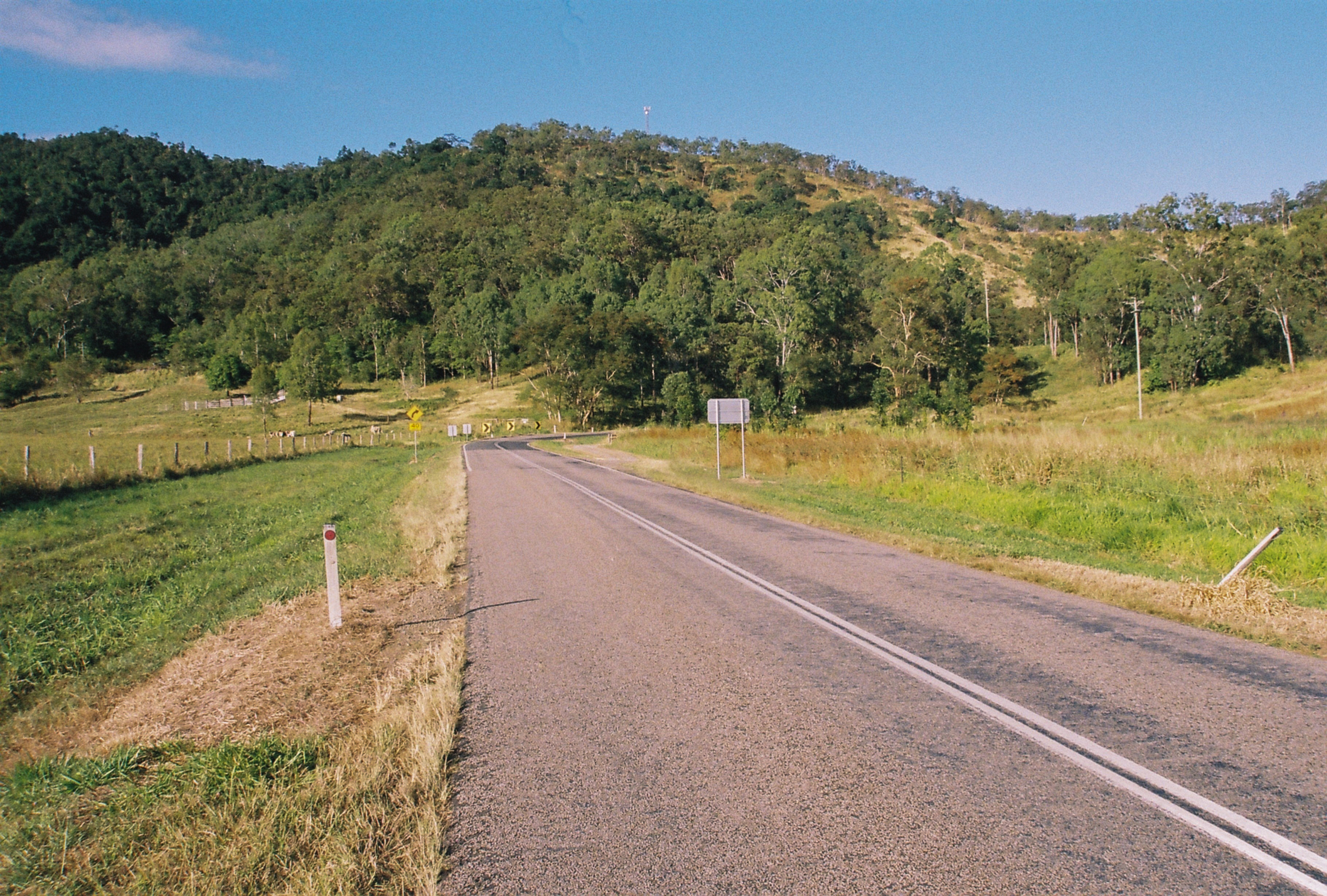
- Marlborough–Sarina Road in Sarina Range, 2013

- Interactive map of Sarina Range
- Coordinates: 21.5513°S 149.1083°E
- Country: Australia
- State: Queensland
- LGA: Mackay Region
- Location: 20.7 km (12.9 mi) SW of Sarina; 56.8 km (35.3 mi) S of Mackay; 940 km (580 mi) NNW of Brisbane

Government
  - State electorate: Mirani
  - Federal division: Capricornia

Area
  - Total: 171.4 km^{2} (66.2 sq mi)

Population
  - Total: 277 (2021 census)
  - Density: 1.616/km^{2} (4.186/sq mi)
- Time zone: UTC+10:00 (AEST)
- Postcode: 4737
Suburbs around Sarina Range
Blue Mountain	Sarina	Sarina
Blue Mountain	Sarina Range	Koumala
Koumala	Koumala	Koumala

Sarina Range is a rural locality in the Mackay Region, Queensland, Australia. In the 2021 census, Sarina Range had a population of 277 people.

== Geography ==
The Marlborough–Sarina Road runs through from south to north.

== History ==
The name Sarina Range is probably derived from the Sarina Inlet, which in turn is believed to be named by surveyor William Charles Borlase Wilson, using a name from Greek mythology indicating enchantress.

East Funnel Creek Provisional School opened on 23 June 1941. In 1950, it became East Funnel Creek State School. It closed in 1963. It was on a 5-acre (2.0 ha) site at 655 East Funnel Creek Road (21.54106°S 149.15604°E).

== Demographics ==
In the 2016 census, Sarina Range had a population of 250 people.

In the 2021 census, Sarina Range had a population of 277 people.

== Education ==
There are no schools in Sarina Range. The nearest government primary schools are Swayneville State School in neighbouring Sarina to the north and Koumala State School in neighbouring Koumala to the east. The nearest government secondary school is Sarina State High School in Sarina to the north.

== Community groups ==
The Nebo Sarina Range branch of the Queensland Country Women's Association meets at 1994 Marlborough Sarina Road.
