= Mackay Town Hall =

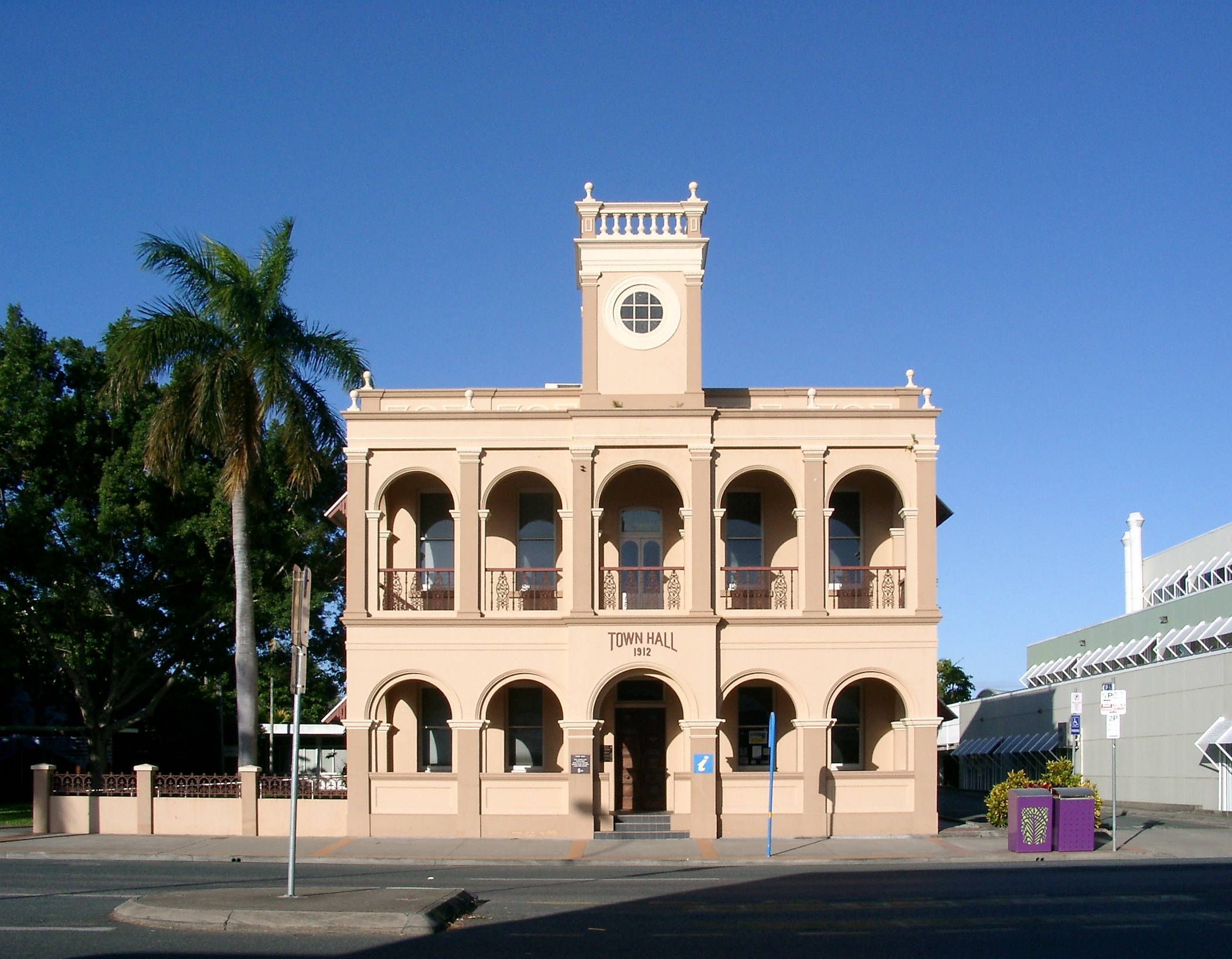
- Mackay Town Hall, 2008

- Location within Queensland
- 21.1424°S 149.1874°E
- Location: 63 Sydney Street, Mackay, Mackay Region, Queensland, Australia

History
- Design period: 1900–1914 (early 20th century)
- Built: 1912
- Built for: Mackay Town Council

Site notes
- Architect: Arthur Rigby
- Architectural style: Classicism

Queensland Heritage Register
- Official name: Mackay Town Hall (former)
- Type: state heritage (built)
- Designated: 29 May 1998
- Reference no.: 601107
- Significant period: 1910s (historical); 1910s, 1930s (fabric); 1912–ongoing (social)
- Significant components: views from, tower – clock, verandahs – arcaded, views to, council chamber/meeting room
- Builders: Charles Porter

Mackay Town Hall is a heritage-listed former town hall at 63 Sydney Street, Mackay, Mackay Region, Queensland, Australia. It is the second town hall to be built on this site. It was designed by Arthur Rigby built in 1912 by Charles Porter for the Mackay Town Council. It was added to the Queensland Heritage Register on 29 May 1998.

== History ==
The former Mackay Town Hall, the second constructed in the city, was built in 1912 by local builder, Charles Porter, to the design of Mackay architect Arthur Rigby. It was constructed on land purchased by the Mackay Borough Council on 13 December 1872.

John Mackay and his party had explored what was to become the Pioneer Valley in 1860. The present city blocks were surveyed in June 1863 when the settlement consisted of several dozen huts and tents in a line along a track parallel to the southern bank of the river, and the first land sale was held at the police office, Bowen, on 13 October 1863.

The settlement became the business centre for the pastoral stations in the district, providing services, supplies and port facilities. By the mid-1860s the township of Mackay had a post office, telegraph connection to Brisbane, churches, banks, and a racecourse. The track through the valley and over the range to Fort Cooper pastoral run had been upgraded to a road.

By 1868, public meetings had discussed the establishment of a local municipal council under the Municipal Institutions Act 1864 for the purposes of establishing local government in the area. Further meetings and a petition signed by 178 householders, freeholders and residents of Mackay resulted in the proclamation of the Borough of Mackay on 22 September 1869.

The inaugural meeting of the Mackay Municipal Council, which was composed of local businessmen, was held on 1 December 1869. This meeting was possibly held in the Court House in River Street, which served a number of government functions. Soon after, the Council met in the original Post and Telegraph Office in Wood Street. Subsequent meetings were held in a building in Sydney Street owned by Mr R Fleming.

The first Municipal Chambers (town hall) of Mackay was a timber structure, constructed on Allotment 3 Section 33 in Sydney Street in 1872. By 1884, when Mackay was experiencing a boom in sugar prices, the building was deemed to be inadequate and plans were prepared for a new town hall. However, it was not until 1909 that the Town Council accepted recommendations from its newly formed Town Hall Committee, that a town hall of brick be built and that Council apply for a ten year loan from the Queensland Government for that purpose. The following March, the Committee also recommended the building should be on the site of the original Town Hall in Sydney Street, and that competitive designs be called for.

Two designs were submitted, and that of Mackay architect and engineer Arthur Rigby was accepted on 30 November 1911, with modifications to the roof as recommended by the Treasury Department. Tenders for construction were called and the lowest, that of Charles Porter for £2327, was accepted. Porter had previously undertaken major building contracts for the South African Government, and his constructions in Mackay included several nearby places of local significance, including Paxton's Shipping Office and Store, St Patrick's Presbytery and St Mary's Church in River Street as well as the Australian Hotel. His company also supplied building material and furniture to the Mackay community.

The first town hall was moved to the rear of the block, to make way for the new building. Tenders were accepted from Thomas Cherry, a cabinetmaker in Mackay, and Victor Leon Thomas Warry for the supply of furniture and Porter's supplied gas fittings. Furnishings included "cork carpet" in the hallway, linoleum in the downstairs rooms, fibre matting on the stairs and the Council room left bare. Photographs of John Mackay and past mayors were hung in the entrance hallway.

The Town Hall was constructed of locally produced bricks and the plan featured a central, square tower designed to include a clock. The clock was never purchased and circular, glass paned windows still remain on the west, north and south sides of the tower.

The new Town Hall was constructed during the year of the "Jubilee of 50 years of economic growth". The official opening was on Wednesday 2 October 1912. The first official Council meeting was held in the new building on Friday 10 October 1912.

In October 1915 the Mackay Harbour Board requested that a Roll of Honour Board be erected in the Town Hall, listing the names of those from Mackay and district who had enlisted in World War I, together with photographs of those killed. The marble Honour Board, installed in March 1917, is mounted on the wall of the corridor of the Town Hall, although the inscriptions are incomplete.

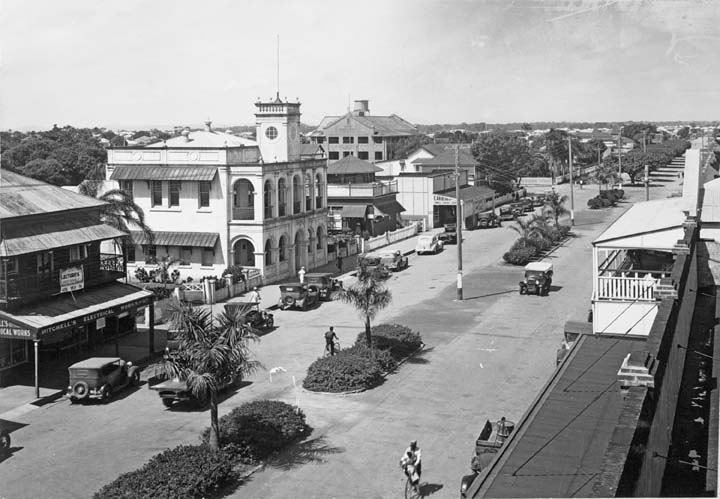
Town hall on Sydney Street, circa 1936

In the 1918 Mackay cyclone, the Town Hall was one of the few buildings in Mackay which was not damaged and was used as a refuge for evacuees. A child born during this period was given the middle name of Hall.

Extensions to the rear of the building were completed by 1939–1940. Further extensions were added in 1949 and 1959 to accommodate an increasing Council staff.

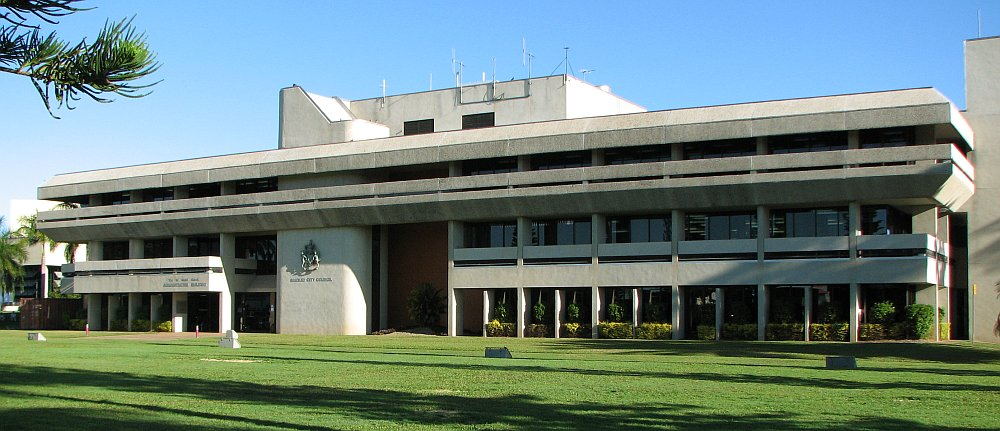
Mackay Civic Administration Building, 2006

After moving to the new Civic Administration Building in 1974, the council planned to demolish the existing Town Hall and offer the site and adjacent parkland for commercial development to help defray costs of the new building. Following a public meeting of 500 people protesting the decision, 18 months of debate and a petition of over 8500 signatures, Council eventually agreed to retain the building. However, the 1949 and 1959 extensions to the rear of the building were demolished.

In 1982–1983, Council spent $120,000 renovating the building. This work included repairs to structural weaknesses; the exterior repaired and painted; louvred extensions on balconies removed; floors tiled; railings on upper and lowers balconies restored; internal painting; wall papering and carpeting throughout; ceiling fans and new lighting installed; hand rails on stairs and all window sills scraped and polished and the original brass door knobs and fittings polished. In March 1983 the building was leased to the Department of Community Health.

In 1996, the Council coordinated public meetings to discuss the future of the now-vacant building. Strong attendance showed the community concern over the building, and favoured community uses for it. In 2016, the Regional Social Development Centre (formerly Mackay Regional Council for Social Development) operate in the former town hall.

== Description ==
The former Mackay Town Hall is a two-storeyed rendered masonry building facing Sydney Street, Mackay. The street facade, facing west, has a two-storey arcaded verandah is symmetrical about a central entry and clock tower. To the northern side and the rear of the building is a public park.

The street facade is divided into five bays of semi-circular moulded arches with pilasters between and string courses. At the centre is a square clock tower with balustrade parapet, ball finials and circular windows. Above the entry archway, which projects slightly forward of the others, is "Town Hall 1912" in relief.

The parapet of the verandah has a cornice and ball finials, and is at a lower level than the parapet of the main building. The upper level verandah has cast iron balustrading and the lower level masonry. The verandah ceilings are ripple iron.

To the side elevations are timber double-hung sash windows with arched heads, whilst those to the lower verandah have square heads. To the upper level verandah are several pairs of French doors. The side and rear windows have hoods of timber and corrugated steel.

Centrally located on the lower verandah, the main entry has a pair of timber panelled doors with brass handles and letter slots. Beyond the entry is a central corridor with offices to either side. The corridor contains the marble honour boards and the timber stair, which has turned balusters and newels. The honour boards, mounted on the southern wall of the ground floor corridor, list 1592 local servicemen from the First World War. The dedication inscription has not been completed.

Ceilings throughout are decorative pressed metal with metal roses.

The upper level is a single room, formerly the Council Chambers, from which French doors open onto the upper verandah.

Added to the south-east corner of the ground floor are toilets accessible from the exterior.

== Heritage listing ==
The former Mackay Town Hall was listed on the Queensland Heritage Register on 29 May 1998 having satisfied the following criteria.

The place is important in demonstrating the evolution or pattern of Queensland's history.

The former Mackay Town Hall, the centre of administration for the Mackay Municipal Council, was constructed in 1912 on the site of the earlier timber town hall. This second town hall served as the centre of local government for over 60 years, until the construction of the Mackay Civic Centre in 1975.

The place demonstrates rare, uncommon or endangered aspects of Queensland's cultural heritage.

The building, which was one of few buildings of the Mackay City Centre to survive the devastating cyclone of 1918, is evidence of the growth and prominence of Mackay at that time.

The place is important in demonstrating the principal characteristics of a particular class of cultural places.

The former Town Hall demonstrates the principal characteristics of regional town halls, being a substantial two storeyed building on a prominent site featuring a dominant clock tower.

The place is important because of its aesthetic significance.

The former Town Hall, with its two storey formal street facade, two-storey verandah with moulded arcade and clock tower, makes a substantial contribution to the streetscape of Mackay's city centre.

The place has a strong or special association with a particular community or cultural group for social, cultural or spiritual reasons.

The importance of the building to the community has been demonstrated by public pressure to retain the building when it was threatened with demolition in the 1970s, and community interest in its ongoing use in the 1990s. Council undertook substantial refurbishment works during the 1980s.
