= Munbura, Queensland =

Munbura
- Suburb
- Interactive map of Munbura
- Coordinates: 21.3688°S 149.1261°E
- Country: Australia
- State: Queensland
- LGA: Mackay Region
- Location: 20.6 km (12.8 mi) NW of Sarina; 26.3 km (16.3 mi) SSW of Mackay; 320 km (200 mi) NNW of Rockhampton; 950 km (590 mi) NNW of Brisbane

Government
  - State electorate: Mirani
  - Federal division: Capricornia

Area
  - Total: 33.8 km^{2} (13.1 sq mi)

Population
  - Total: 89 (2021 census)
  - Density: 2.633/km^{2} (6.82/sq mi)
- Time zone: UTC+10:00 (AEST)
- Postcode: 4740
Suburbs around Munbura
Sunnyside	Balberra	Alligator Creek
Sunnyside	Munbura	Alligator Creek
Sarina	Sarina	Sarina

Munbura is a rural locality in the Mackay Region, Queensland, Australia. In the 2021 census, Munbura had a population of 89 people.

== Geography ==
Alligator Creek forms the eastern boundary, and Bells Creek the northern and western. Sarina Homebush Road (State Route 5) follows the south-western boundary.

The North Coast railway line enters the locality from the east (Alligator Creek) and exits to the north-west (Sunnyside / Balberra). The locality was served by the now-abandoned Munbura railway station (21.3393°S 149.1426°E).

The land use is predominantly growing sugarcane. There are a number of cane tramways to transport the harvested sugarcane to the local sugar mills.

== History ==
The locality takes its name from the Munbura railway station which was named on 30 October 1913 by J. Strachan, the Mackay railway traffic manager in the Queensland Railways Department. It is an Aboriginal word meaning poplar gum.

Munbura State School opened on 16 August 1920. It closed in December 1971. It was on the eastern side of Boyds Road, south of the railway station (approx 21.34243°S 149.14500°E).

== Demographics ==
In the 2016 census, Munbura had a population of 115 people.

In the 2021 census, Munbura had a population of 89 people.

== Education ==
There are no schools in Munbura. The nearest government primary schools are Chelona State School in Chelona to the north and Sarina State School in neighbouring Sarina to the south-east. The nearest government secondary school is Sarina State High School, also in Sarina.
