= Grasstree Beach, Queensland =

Grasstree Beach
- Suburb
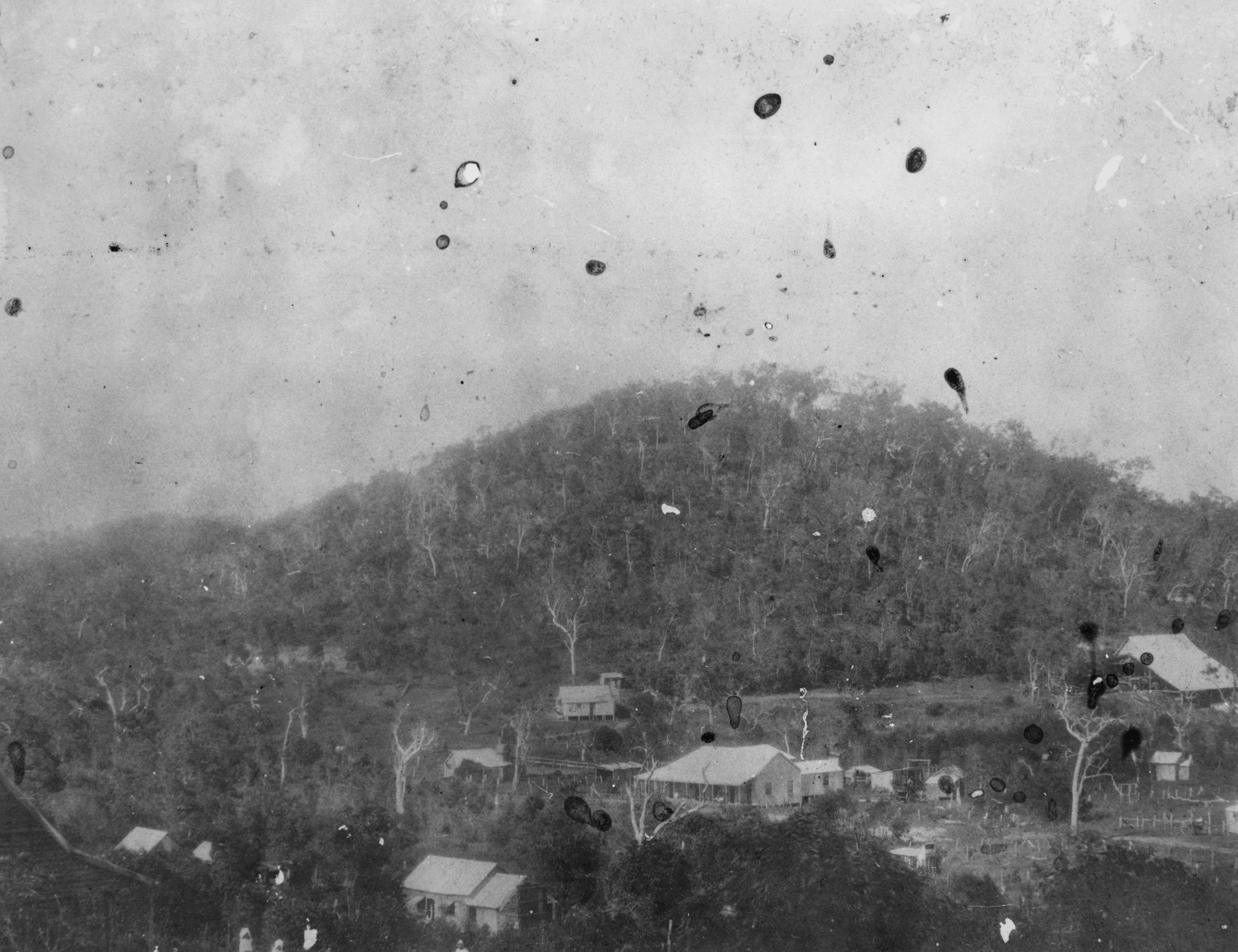
- Settlement on the Zelma Goldfields, circa 1900

- Interactive map of Grasstree Beach
- Coordinates: 21.345°S 149.2675°E
- Country: Australia
- State: Queensland
- LGA: Mackay Region
- Location: 15.6 km (9.7 mi) NW of Sarina; 36.8 km (22.9 mi) SSE of Mackay; 315 km (196 mi) NNW of Rockhampton; 959 km (596 mi) NNW of Brisbane

Government
  - State electorate: Mirani
  - Federal division: Capricornia

Area
  - Total: 16.9 km^{2} (6.5 sq mi)

Population
  - Total: 717 (2021 census)
  - Density: 42.43/km^{2} (109.9/sq mi)
- Time zone: UTC+10:00 (AEST)
- Postcode: 4740
Suburbs around Grasstree Beach
Alligator Creek	Hay Point	Coral Sea
Sarina	Grasstree Beach	Coral Sea
Sarina	Sarina Beach	Campwin Beach

Grasstree Beach is a coastal locality in the Mackay Region, Queensland, Australia. It contains two towns, Grasstree in the centre of the locality (21.3619°S 149.2939°E) and Zelma on the coast (21.3636°S 149.30722°E). In the 2021 census, Grasstree Beach had a population of 717 people.

== Geography ==
The Coral Sea forms the eastern boundary of the locality while Cabbage Tree Creek and Castrades Inlet form the southern boundary.

The locality has the following coastal features, clockwise:

- Victor Island (21.3236°S 149.3233°E)
- Point Victor (21.3357°S 149.3003°E)
- Mick Ready Beach (21.3457°S 149.3045°E)
- Grasstree Beach (21.3656°S 149.3078°E)
- Castrades Inlet (21.3761°S 149.31°E)
- Cabbage Tree Creek (21.36816°S 149.30144°E)

The locality has the following mountains:

- Mount Haden (21.3573°S 149.2975°E) 157 metres (515 ft)
- Raspberry Hill (21.3598°S 149.2639°E) 37 metres (121 ft)

The Goonyella railway line enters the locality from the south-west (Sarina / Sarina Beach) and exits the locality to the north (Hay Point). The locality is served by the Dalrymple Junction railway station (21.3478°S 149.2815°E).

Much of the land in the east of locality is undeveloped. There is suburban housing in the two towns with some rural residential housing to the north-west of the town of Grasstree and in the south-west of the locality. Apart from that, the predominant land use in the west of the locality is grazing on native vegetation.

== History ==
Gold was found in the area in 1889. The town of Grasstree first appears on an 1891 survey plan.

In August 1891, residents commenced fundraising to establish a school. Grass Tree Provisional School opened circa 1892 and closed in 1899. It reopened in 1901 and closed permanently in 1905 due to low student numbers. It was located on the north-eastern side of Haden Street (21.36105°S 149.29597°E).

The town of Zelma first appears on a 1935 survey plan.

The locality was officially named and bounded on 4 June 1999.

== Demographics ==
In the 2016 census, Grasstree Beach had a population of 745 people.

In the 2021 census, Grasstree Beach had a population of 717 people.

== Education ==
There are no schools in Grasstree Beach. The nearest government primary school is Alligator Creek State School in neighbouring Alligator Creek to the west. The nearest government secondary school is Sarina State High School in neighbouring Sarina to the south-west.
