= Hay Point, Queensland =

Hay Point
- Town
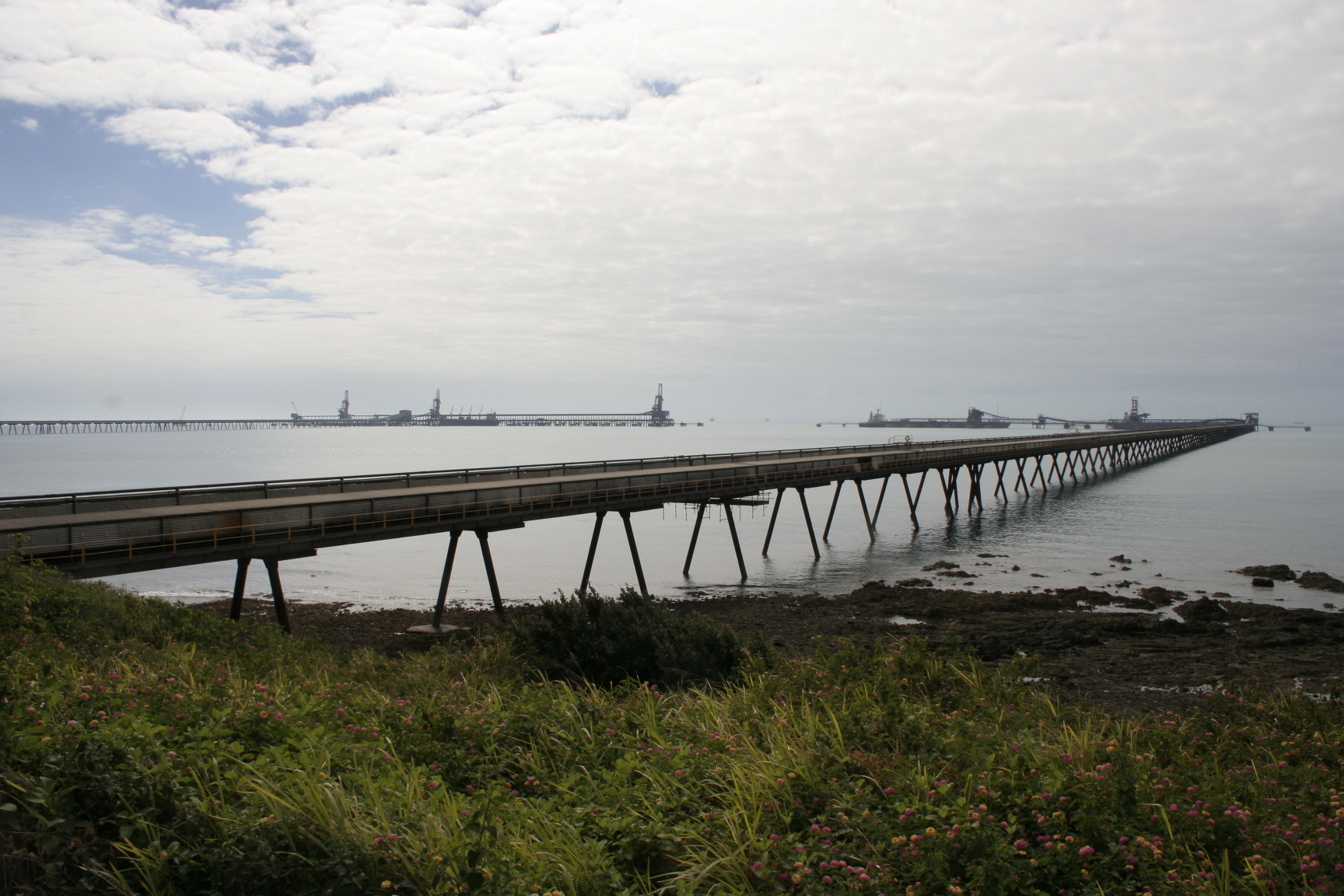
- Coal loaders at Hay Point

- Interactive map of Hay Point
- Coordinates: 21.3027°S 149.2636°E
- Country: Australia
- State: Queensland
- LGA: Mackay Region
- Location: 20.7 km (12.9 mi) NE of Sarina; 33.7 km (20.9 mi) SSE of Mackay; 320 km (200 mi) NNW of Rockhampton; 951 km (591 mi) NNW of Brisbane

Government
  - State electorate: Mirani
  - Federal division: Capricornia

Area
  - Total: 23.1 km^{2} (8.9 sq mi)

Population
  - Total: 1,306 (2021 census)
  - Density: 56.54/km^{2} (146.4/sq mi)
- Time zone: UTC+10:00 (AEST)
- Postcode: 4740
Localities around Hay Point
Alligator Creek	Coral Sea	Coral Sea
Alligator Creek	Hay Point	Coral Sea
Alligator Creek	Grasstree Beach	Coral Sea

Hay Point is a coastal locality in Mackay Region, Queensland, Australia. It contains two towns, Hector on its north coast (21.2769°S 149.27°E) and Half Tide on its south coast (21.2972°S 149.2919°E). In the 2021 census, the locality of Hay Point had a population of 1,306 people.

== Geography ==
Hay Point is located approximately 40 kilometres (25 mi) south of the city of Mackay.

With a tidal range of 7.4m (the highest on the east coast of Australia), Hay Point has potential for electricity generation via tidal power.

== History ==
The town of Hector was first surveyed in 1902.

== Demographics ==
In the 2006 census, the locality of Hay Point and the surrounding area had a population of 1,386.

In the 2016 census, the locality of Hay Point had a population of 1,348 people.

In the 2021 census, the locality of Hay Point had a population of 1,306 people.

== Coal export terminals ==
Hay Point has two bulk coal terminals. Dalrymple Bay Coal Terminal (DBCT) is owned by the Queensland State Government and leased for 50 years to Dalrymple Bay Infrastructure (formerly Babcock & Brown Infrastructure), who in turn engage Dalrymple Bay Coal Terminal Pty Ltd to operate, maintain and develop it. Hay Point Services Coal Terminal is owned and operated by BHP Mitsubishi Alliance a joint venture between BHP and Mitsubishi, and operated by Hay Point Services.

In 2003–4, 77 million tonnes of coal was exported through the two terminals. 97 million tonnes was exported in 2021-22. This makes Hay Point one of the largest coal ports in the world.

== Education ==
There are no schools in Hay Point. The nearest government primary school is Alligator Creek State School in neighbouring Alligator Creek to the south-west. The nearest government secondary school is Sarina State High School in Sarina to the south-west.

== Amenities ==
The Mackay Regional Council operates a mobile library service on a fortnightly schedule at the corner of Valroy and Carey Streets.
