= Sunnyside, Queensland =

Sunnyside
- Suburb
- Interactive map of Sunnyside
- Coordinates: 21.3491°S 149.0941°E
- Country: Australia
- State: Queensland
- LGA: Mackay Region
- Location: 19.7 km (12.2 mi) NW of Sarina; 28.4 km (17.6 mi) SW of Mackay; 957 km (595 mi) NNW of Brisbane

Government
  - State electorate: Mirani
  - Federal division: Capricornia

Area
  - Total: 44.6 km^{2} (17.2 sq mi)

Population
  - Total: 127 (2021 census)
  - Density: 2.848/km^{2} (7.38/sq mi)
- Time zone: UTC+10:00 (AEST)
- Postcode: 4737
Suburbs around Sunnyside
Oakenden	Balberra	Balberra
Oakenden	Sunnyside	Munbura
Blue Mountain	Sarina	Sarina

Sunnyside is a rural locality in the Mackay Region, Queensland, Australia. In the 2021 census, Sunnyside had a population of 127 people.

== Geography ==
Bells Creek forms much of the eastern boundary. Sarina Homebush Road (State Route 5) follows part of the eastern boundary before passing through from south-east to north-west.

== History ==
Scrubby Mount Provisional School opened on 3 February 1896. On 1 January 1909, it became Scrubby Mount State School. It was near the intersection of Sarina-Homebush Road and Marwood-Sunnyside Road (approx 21.3465°S 149.0812°E). In 1911, the school was relocated to a new site and, in 1912, it was renamed Sunnyside State School. It closed on 31 December 1960. Sunnyside State School was on western side of Sarina-Homebush Road (approx 21.3679°S 149.0950°E).

== Demographics ==
In the 2016 census, Sunnyside had a population of 145 people.

In the 2021 census, Sunnyside had a population of 127 people.

== Education ==
There are no schools in Sunnyside. The nearest government primary schools are Oakenden State School in neighbouring Oakenden to the north-west, Chelona State School in Chelona to the north-east, and Sarina State School in neighbouring Sarina to the south-east. The nearest government secondary schools are Sarina State High School, also in Sarina, and Mackay State High School in South Mackay.
