= Oakenden, Queensland =

Oakenden
- Suburb
- Interactive map of Oakenden
- Coordinates: 21.3291°S 149.0205°E
- Country: Australia
- State: Queensland
- LGA: Mackay Region
- Location: 27.8 km (17.3 mi) NW of Sarina; 31.2 km (19.4 mi) SW of Mackay; 37.9 km (23.5 mi) SE of Mirani; 945 km (587 mi) NNW of Brisbane

Government
  - State electorate: Mirani
  - Federal division: Capricornia

Area
  - Total: 84.4 km^{2} (32.6 sq mi)

Population
  - Total: 424 (2021 census)
  - Density: 5.024/km^{2} (13.011/sq mi)
- Time zone: UTC+10:00 (AEST)
- Postcode: 4741
Suburbs around Oakenden
| Eton | Homebush | Homebush |
| Eton | Oakenden | Balberra |
| Blue Mountain | Blue Mountain | Sunnyside |

Oakenden is a rural locality in the Mackay Region, Queensland, Australia. In the 2021 census, Oakenden had a population of 424 people.

== History ==
Oakenden State School opened on 14 November 1910.

== Demographics ==
In the 2016 census, Oakenden had a population of 431 people.

In the 2021 census, Oakenden had a population of 424 people.

== Education ==
Oakenden State School is a government primary (Prep-6) school for boys and girls at 177 Oakenden School Road (21.3116°S 149.0050°E). In 2018, the school had an enrolment of 12 students with 2 teachers (1 full-time equivalent) and 5 non-teaching staff (2 full-time equivalent).

There is no secondary school in the locality. The nearest are Sarina State High School in Sarina to the south-east, Mirani State High School in Mirani to the north-west and Mackay State High School in Mackay to the north-east.

== Amenities ==
The Mackay Regional Council operates a mobile library service on a fortnightly schedule at Oakenden School Road.
