= George David Silva =

Australian murderer (1884–1912)

George Silva
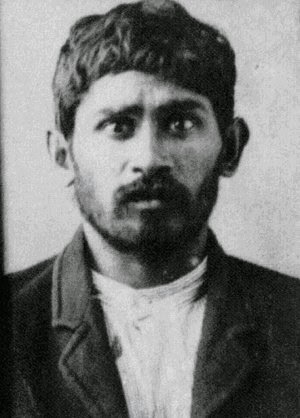
- Silva in 1911
- Born: 1884; Homebush, Queensland, Australia
- Died: 10 June 1912 (aged 28); Boggo Road Gaol, Queensland, Australia
- Resting place: South Brisbane Cemetery
- Status: Executed by hanging
- Motive: Romantic rejection
- Conviction: Wilful murder
- Penalty: Death

Details
- Date: 16 November 1911
- Country: Australia
- Location: Alligator Creek, Mackay, Queensland
- Killed: 6

George David Silva (1884 – 10 June 1912) was an Australian mass murderer. Silva, who was of Sinhalese descent, worked as a farmhand on a property owned by Hong Kong-born Charles Ching at Alligator Creek, about 20 miles (32 km) from Mackay, Queensland.

== Early life ==
Silva was born in Homebush, near Mackay, Queensland, to Sri Lankan parents. He became a passionate attendant of the local church and often led prayers. He became known as a preacher and a "pet" of the church. As an adult, Silva found work as a farmhand on a property at Alligator Creek, 20 miles out of town.

Silva's employer was a property owner named Charlie Ching. Ching was a man from Hong Kong who was married to English-born Agnes. They lived in a corrugated iron home with a dirt floor. The kitchen was in a separate structure, away from the main home. However, in comparison to Silva, who had almost nothing, they were wealthy.

Silva wanted to marry the Chings' oldest daughter, teenage Maud Ching. He told a neighbour that he would get a plot of land from Charlie Ching by Christmas and he would build a house to start a family. The neighbour replied "You can't marry. You got no money. You got no blanket. No decent trousers. How would a girl like to marry you like that?"

Silva's marriage proposal was rejected by the Chings as he had nothing to offer their daughter. Maud also rejected his advances.

== Murders, trial, and execution ==
On 16 November 1911, Charles Ching told Silva he was traveling to town for supplies and money for Silva's wages. While he was away, Silva murdered the six Chings. The bodies of Agnes, Maud, Hugh, and Winnie were found inside the house piled under a rug. Mother Agnes and eldest daughter Maud had been shot by a revolver and a muzzle-loading rifle, while the boy and the baby had their skulls smashed against the wall. The bodies of Teddy and Dolly Ching were found a mile and a half away; both had been shot and their skulls smashed in.

Police and Aboriginal trackers inspected the crime scene, and after the trackers stated that there was no trail to follow the police homed in on Silva. Silva, fearing a lynch mob from Mackay, eventually confessed to police. He claimed that two neighbours had helped him murder the family, but the police found no evidence of him having any accomplices.

Tried only for killing Maud Ching, Silva admitted to being present, but denied personally killing anyone. It took the jury only 20 minutes to find him guilty of murder. Silva was given a mandatory death sentence and hanged at Boggo Road Gaol in Dutton Park, Brisbane, on 10 June 1912. In his final moments, Silva repeatedly quoted passages from the Bible in an attempt to delay his execution until prison authorities told him to stop. Silva tried to keep talking as the noose was slipped around his neck, but was hanged before he could finish. He was buried at South Brisbane Cemetery, Dutton Park.

== Victims ==
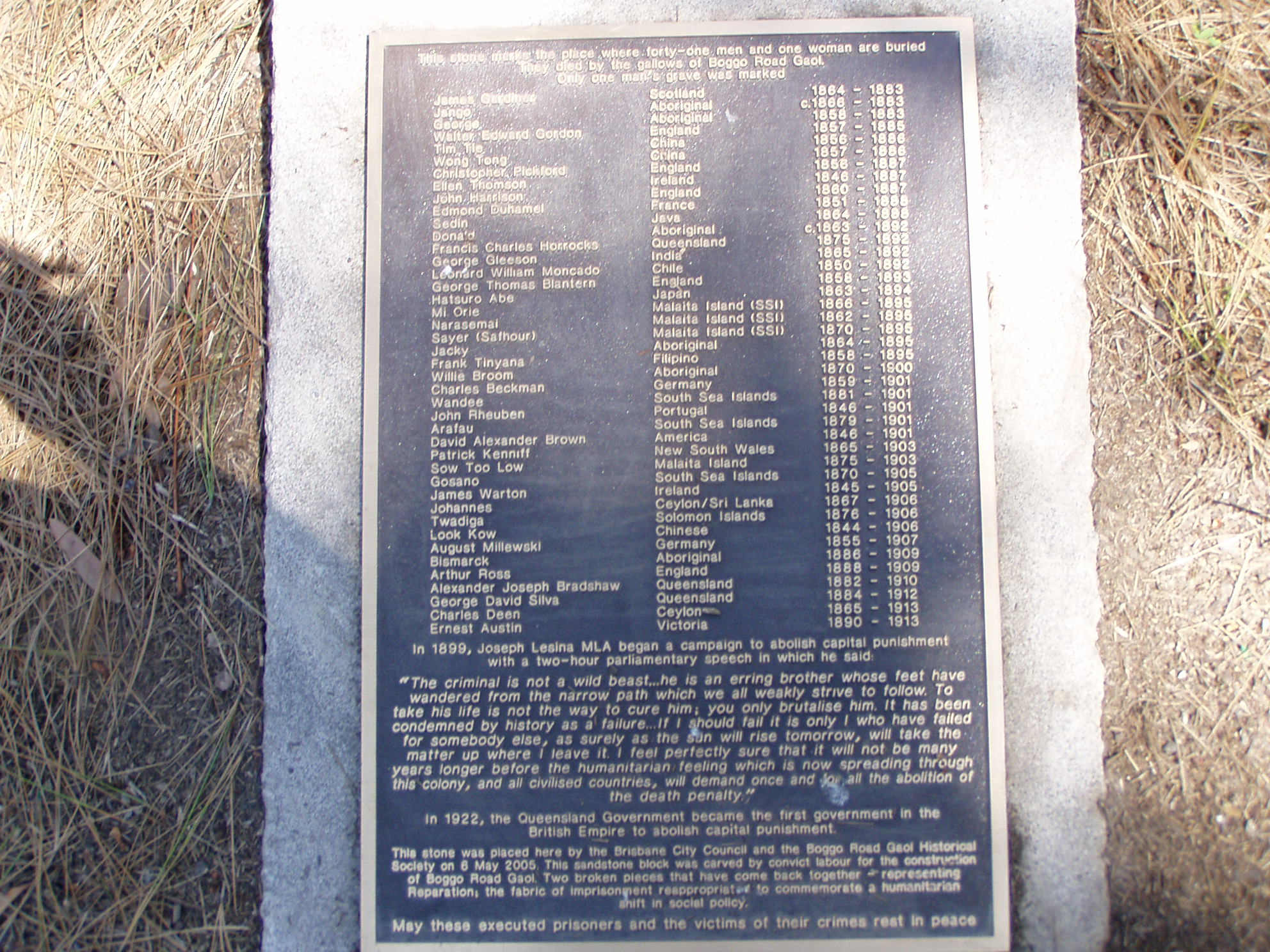
Plaque at the burial site in South Brisbane Cemetery of those hanged at Boggo Road Gaol. Silva's name is third from the bottom.

- Agnes Ching, wife of Charles Ching
- Maud (Note: Alternatively spelt Maud or Maudie.) Ching, 17, (Note: Also reported as aged 15.) daughter of Charles Ching
- Teddy Ching, 10, son of Charles Ching
- Dolly Ching, 8, daughter of Charles Ching
- Hugh (Note: Alternatively spelt Hughie.) Ching, 4, son of Charles Ching
- Winnie Ching, 20 months, daughter of Charles Ching
