= Alligator Creek, Queensland (Mackay) =

Alligator Creek
- Suburb
- Interactive map of Alligator Creek
- Coordinates: 21.3147°S 149.2105°E
- Country: Australia
- State: Queensland
- LGA: Mackay Region
- Location: 11.5 km (7.1 mi) N of Sarina; 28.3 km (17.6 mi) S of Mackay; 311 km (193 mi) NNW of Rockhampton; 929 km (577 mi) NNW of Brisbane

Government
  - State electorate: Mirani
  - Federal division: Capricornia

Area
  - Total: 75.3 km^{2} (29.1 sq mi)

Population
  - Total: 897 (2021 census)
  - Density: 11.912/km^{2} (30.85/sq mi)
- Time zone: UTC+10:00 (AEST)
- Postcode: 4740
Suburbs around Alligator Creek
| Balberra | Coral Sea | Hay Point |
| Munbura | Alligator Creek | Grasstree Beach |
| Sarina | Sarina | Sarina |

Alligator Creek is a coastal rural locality in the Mackay Region, Queensland, Australia. In the 2021 census, Alligator Creek had a population of 897 people.

== Geography ==
Dudgeon Point is a headland into the Coral Sea at the northernmost tip of the locality (21.2458°S 149.2547°E).

Mount Hector is a mountain (21.2687°S 149.2655°E) on the Coral Sea coast at the mouth of Louisa Creek. It is 55 metres (180 ft) above sea level.

== History ==
Alligator Creek Provisional School opened on 14 September 1896. On 1 January 1909, it became Alligator State School.

On 17 November 1911, a mother and her five children were murdered in their home at Alligator Creek. The family's farm hand, George David Silva, was convicted of the murder of the mother, and was hanged on 10 June 1912.

== Demographics ==
In the 2016 census, Alligator Creek had a population of 791 people.

In the 2021 census, Alligator Creek had a population of 897 people.

== Education ==
Alligator Creek State School is a government primary (Prep-6) school for boys and girls at 50 Grasstree Road (21.3293°S 149.2115°E). In 2018, the school had an enrolment of 308 students with 24 teachers (20 full-time equivalent) and 15 non-teaching staff (11 full-time equivalents). It includes a special education program.

There are no secondary schools in Alligator Creek. The nearest government secondary school is Sarina State High School in neighbouring Sarina to the south.
