= Balberra, Queensland =

Balberra
- Suburb
- Interactive map of Balberra
- Coordinates: 21.2986°S 149.1411°E
- Country: Australia
- State: Queensland
- LGA: Mackay Region
- Location: 21.4 km (13.3 mi) S of Mackay; 319 km (198 mi) N of Rockhampton; 406 km (252 mi) SE of Townsville; 993 km (617 mi) NNW of Brisbane

Government
  - State electorate: Mirani
  - Federal division: Capricornia

Area
  - Total: 61.6 km^{2} (23.8 sq mi)

Population
  - Total: 425 (2021 census)
  - Density: 6.899/km^{2} (17.87/sq mi)
- Postcode: 4740
Suburbs around Balberra
Sandiford	Chelona	Dunrock; Coral Sea
Homebush; Oakenden	Balberra	Alligator Creek
Sunnyside	Munbura	Alligator Creek

Balberra is a coastal locality in the Mackay Region, Queensland, Australia. In the 2021 census, Balberra had a population of 425 people.

== Geography ==
The northern boundary of the locality is Sandy Creek, the southern boundary is Bell Creek and Alligator Creek, and the western boundary is B L Creek. The eastern tip of the locality is at the joint mouth of Sandy Creek and Alligator Creek as they flow into the Coral Sea.

The Bruce Highway passes through the locality from the north (Chelona) to the south east (Alligator Creek). The North Coast railway line passes through the locality to the west of the highway; Balberra railway station serves the locality.

The predominant land use is growing crops, particularly sugar cane. There is a network of cane tramways in the locality to transport the harvested cane to the sugar mills.

== History ==
The locality appears to take its name from the Balberra railway station, which in turn was named in 1913 by J. Strachan, the Mackay railway traffic manager in the Queensland Railways Department, and takes its name from an Aboriginal word meaning creek.

== Demographics ==
In the 2016 census, Balberra had a population of 457 people.

In the 2021 census, Balberra had a population of 425 people.

== Education ==
There are no schools in Balberra. The nearest government primary schools are Chelona State School in neighbouring Chelona to the north and Alligator Creek State School in neighbouring Alligator Creek to the south-east. The nearest government secondary schools are Mackay State High School in Mackay to the north and Sarina State High School in Sarina to the south.
