= Cremorne, Queensland =

Cremorne
- Suburb
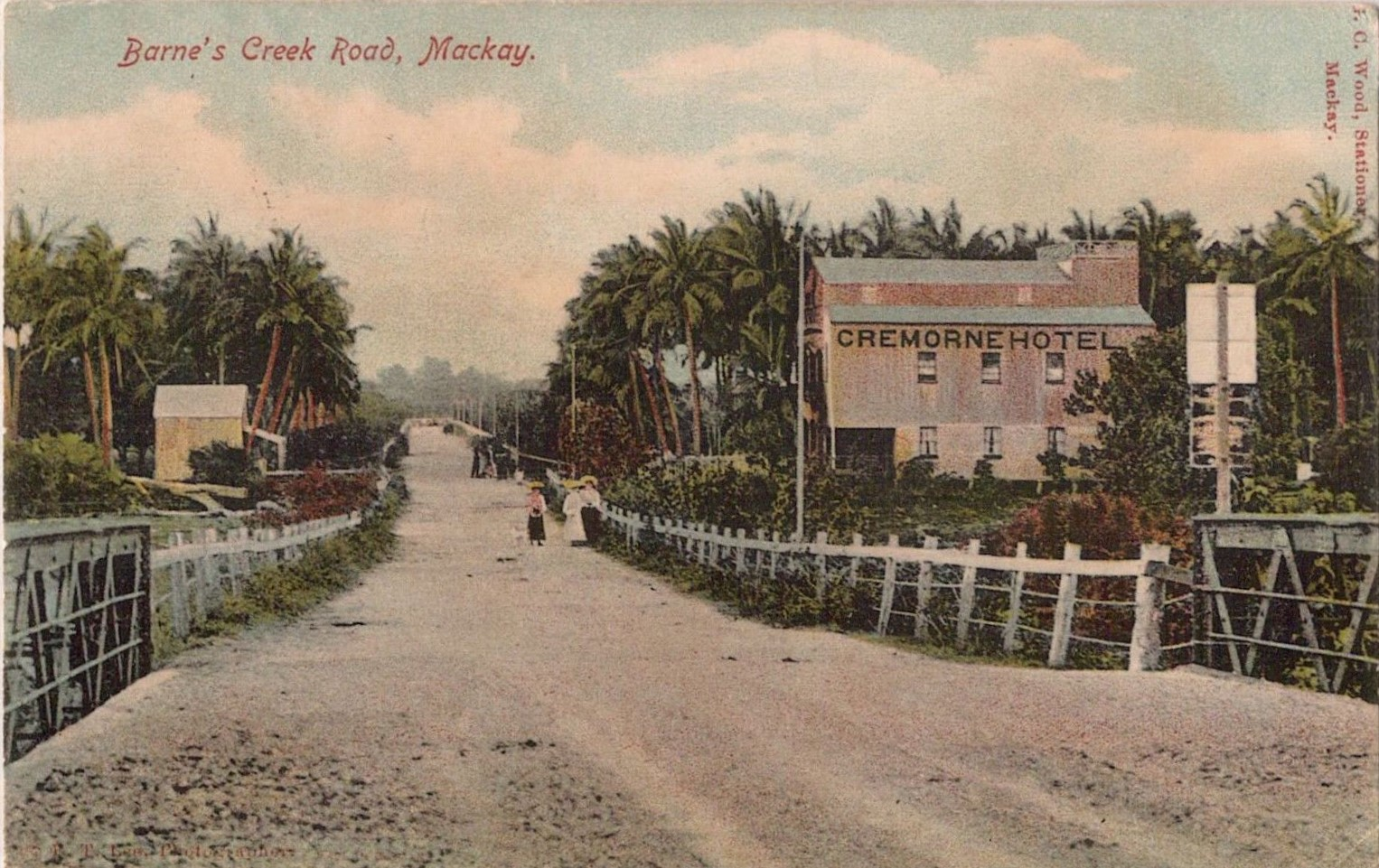
- Cremorne Hotel surrounded by Barnes' coconut palms, early 1900s

- Interactive map of Cremorne
- Coordinates: 21.1361°S 149.1930°E
- Country: Australia
- State: Queensland
- City: Mackay
- LGA: Mackay Region
- Location: 1.4 km (0.87 mi) N of Mackay CBD; 981 km (610 mi) NNW of Brisbane

Government
  - State electorate: Mackay
  - Federal division: Dawson

Area
  - Total: 3.1 km^{2} (1.2 sq mi)

Population
  - Total: 19 (2021 census)
  - Density: 6.13/km^{2} (15.9/sq mi)
- Time zone: UTC+10:00 (AEST)
- Postcode: 4740
Suburbs around Cremorne
North Mackay	North Mackay	North Mackay
Mackay	Cremorne	Mackay Harbour
Mackay	Mackay	Mackay Harbour

Cremorne is a mixed-use locality in the Mackay Region, Queensland, Australia. In the 2021 census, Cremorne had a population of 19 people.

== Geography ==
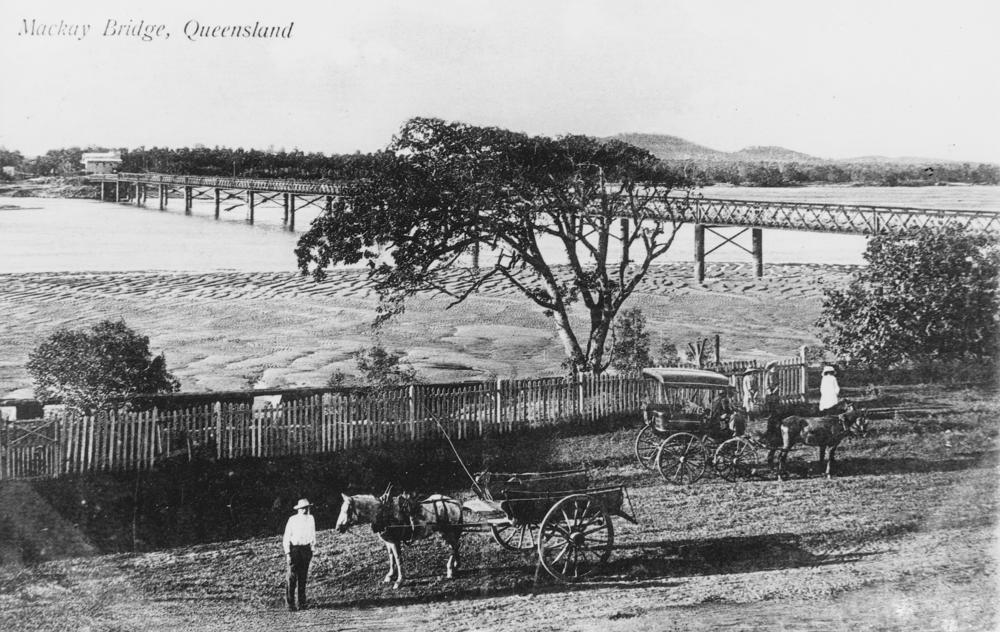
Looking from Mackay across the Pioneer River towards the Cremorne Hotel, circa 1907

Cremorne is on the northern bank of the Pioneer River in the centre of Mackay. The Forgan Smith Bridge crosses from central Mackay over the Pioneer River and through Cremorne to North Mackay. The Pioneer River forms the southern boundary of the locality and Barnes Creek forms the northern boundary. Most of the western part of the locality is parkland (largely undeveloped); there is a small number of industrial buildings around the Forgan Smith Bridge.

== History ==
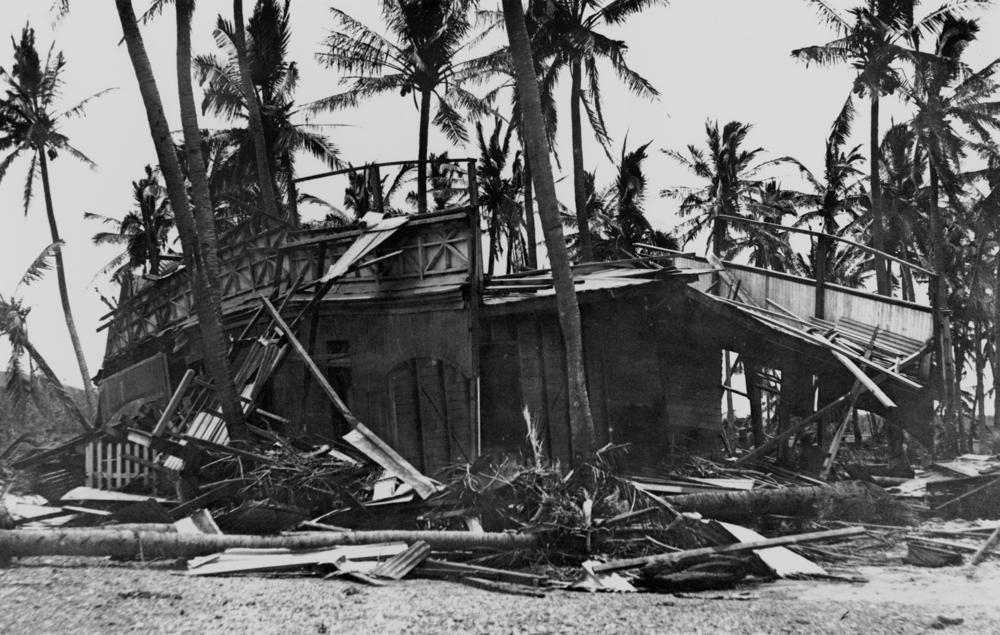
Remains of the Cremorne Hotel North Mackay following the 1918 cyclone

Arriving in 1863, John Greenwood Barnes was the first settler on the northern band of the Pioneer River. He experimented with growing edible tropical plants such as breadfruit, mango, guava, pineapples etc. on behalf of botanist Ferdinand von Mueller, the curator of the Melbourne Botanic Gardens. However his greatest success was with coconut palms which he first planted in 1868 and then expanded to a plantation of 1,200 trees.

In 1884, Barnes erected a two-storey hotel with a promenade roof. Working with his father-in-law William Seaward, he developed pleasure gardens called Cremorne Gardens thought to be modelled on the Cremorne Gardens in Melbourne (Barnes had lived in Victoria before moving to Queensland). In January 1898 the hotel was damaged by Cyclone Eline and then demolished by the January 1918 cyclone.

Barnes Creek is a watercourse (21.1333°S 149.1833°E). It was modified on 24/09/1999. Reportedly named after ?? Barnes ( - ), local selector.

== Demographics ==
In the 2016 census, Cremorne had a population of 33 people.

In the 2021 census, Cremorne had a population of 19 people.

== Education ==
There are no schools in Cremorne. The nearest government primary and secondary schools are Mackay North State School and Mackay North State High School, both in neighbouring North Mackay to the north.
