= McEwens Beach, Queensland =

McEwens Beach
- Town
- Interactive map of McEwens Beach
- Coordinates: 21.2516°S 149.2052°E
- Country: Australia
- State: Queensland
- LGA: Mackay Region
- Location: 15.1 km (9.4 mi) S of Mackay; 327 km (203 mi) NNW of Rockhampton; 941 km (585 mi) NNW of Brisbane

Government
  - State electorate: Mirani
  - Federal division: Dawson

Area
  - Total: 14.2 km^{2} (5.5 sq mi)

Population
  - Total: 159 (2021 census)
  - Density: 11.20/km^{2} (29.00/sq mi)
- Time zone: UTC+10:00 (AEST)
- Postcode: 4740
Localities around McEwens Beach
Bakers Creek	Paget	Coral Sea
Rosella	McEwens Beach	Coral Sea
Chelona	Dunnrock	Dunnrock

McEwens Beach is a coastal town and rural locality in the Mackay Region, Queensland, Australia. In the 2021 census, the locality of McEwens Beach had a population of 159 people.

== Geography ==
The locality is bounded to the east by the Coral Sea with a long sandy beach along the length of the coast, also known as McEwens Beach (21.2526°S 149.2064°E). The town of McEwens Beach is on the south-eastern coast facing Sandringham Bay (21.2497°S 149.2219°E).

The north-east of the locality is Bakers Creek Conservation Park (21.2403°S 149.2049°E). The aim of the park is to protect the shore birds. This includes both the Australian beach stone-curlew which is deemed as vulnerable as well as migratory shore birds.

The town is a small residential area along the south-east coast, accessible via McEwens Beach Road. The area surrounding the town is undeveloped, being mostly marshland. The west of the locality is used to grow sugarcane while the middle of the locality is used for grazing on native vegetation.

There is a cane tramway in the west of the locality to transport the harvested sugarcane to the local sugar mill for processing.

== History ==
From the 1920s the location was known as McEwen’s Beach, after Robert Field McEwen who had purchased land in the area.

The area was named as a township by the Queensland Place Names Board on 11 December 1980.

== Demographics ==
In the 2016 census, the locality of McEwens Beach had a population of 202 people.

In the 2021 census, the locality of McEwens Beach had a population of 159 people.

== Amenities ==
The Mackay Regional Council operates a mobile library service on a fortnightly schedule at Aura Street.

McEwens Beach Reserve is a foreshore park to the south of the town (21.2539°S 149.2054°E). There is an foreshore esplanade at the north of the town (21.2491°S 149.2073°E).

== Education ==
There are no schools in McEwens Beach. The nearest government primary school is Chelona State School in neighbouring Chelona to the south-west. The nearest government secondary school is Mackay State High School in Mackay to the north.
