= Shoal Point, Queensland =

Shoal Point Mackay, Queensland
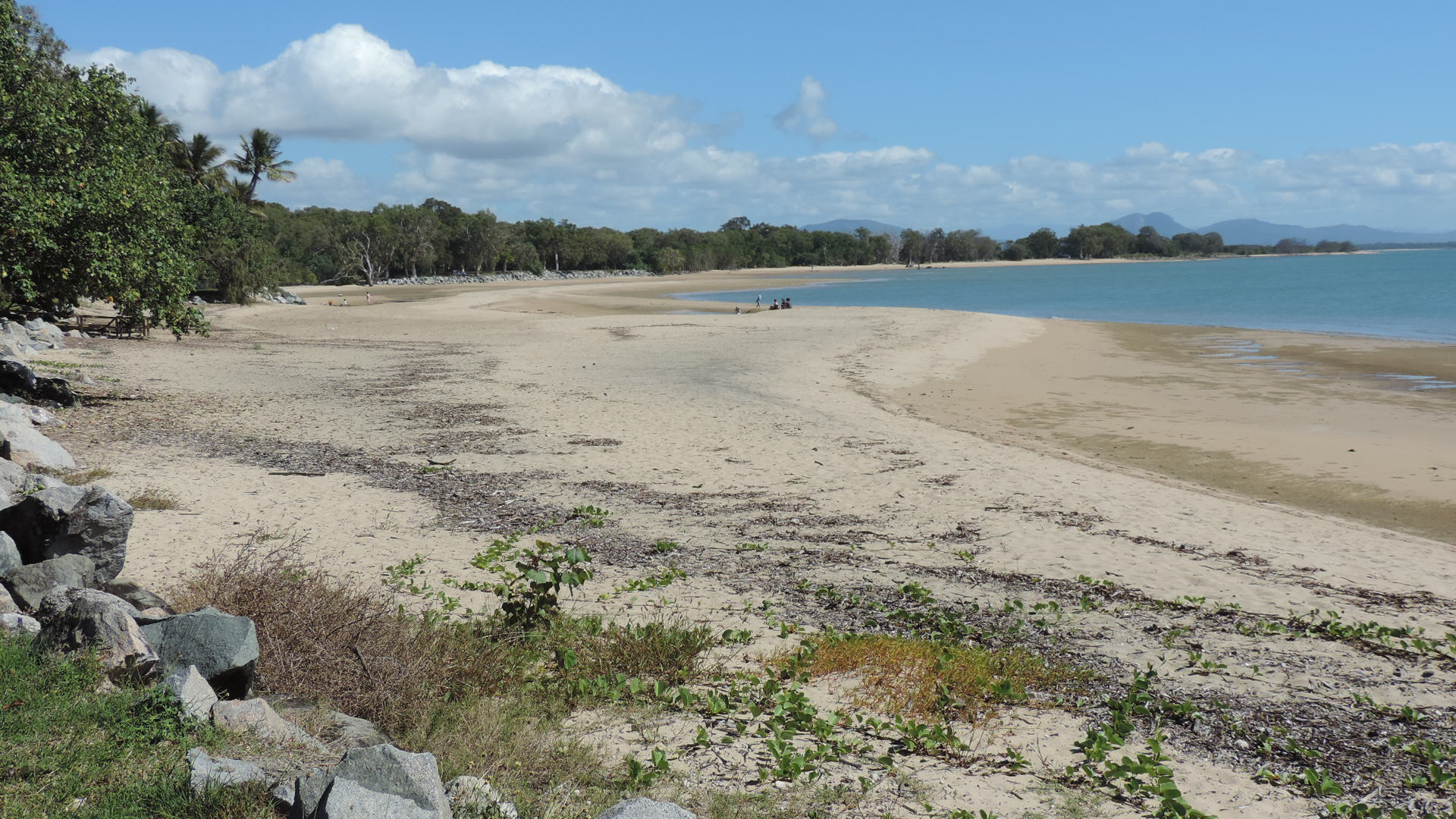
- Looking west along the beach from the esplanade, 2016

- Coordinates: 21.0166°S 149.1422°E
- Population: 1,104 (2021 census)
  - Density: 181.0/km^{2} (469/sq mi)
- Postcode(s): 4750
- Area: 6.1 km^{2} (2.4 sq mi)
- Time zone: AEST (UTC+10:00)
- Location: 6.3 km (4 mi) N of Rural View; 17.8 km (11 mi) N of Mackay; 987 km (613 mi) NNW of Brisbane
- LGA(s): Mackay Region
- State electorate(s): Whitsunday
- Federal division(s): Dawson
Suburbs around Shoal Point:
Coral Sea	Coral Sea	Coral Sea
Habana	Shoal Point	Coral Sea
Habana	Bucasia	Bucasia

Shoal Point is a coastal suburb in the Mackay Region, Queensland, Australia. In the 2021 census, Shoal Point had a population of 1,104 people.

== Geography ==
Shoal Point is a headland at the north-east of the locality (21.0009°S 149.1577°E).

The waters and inlets of the Coral Sea form the eastern and northern boundaries, and most of the western boundary. The Coral Sea coast is a long sandy beach.

The land in the west of the suburb along the inlet is most marshland. The land use along the Coral Sea coast is predominantly surburan housing. Further inland the land use is a mixture of grazing on native vegetation and growing sugarcane and other tropical crops.

== Demographics ==
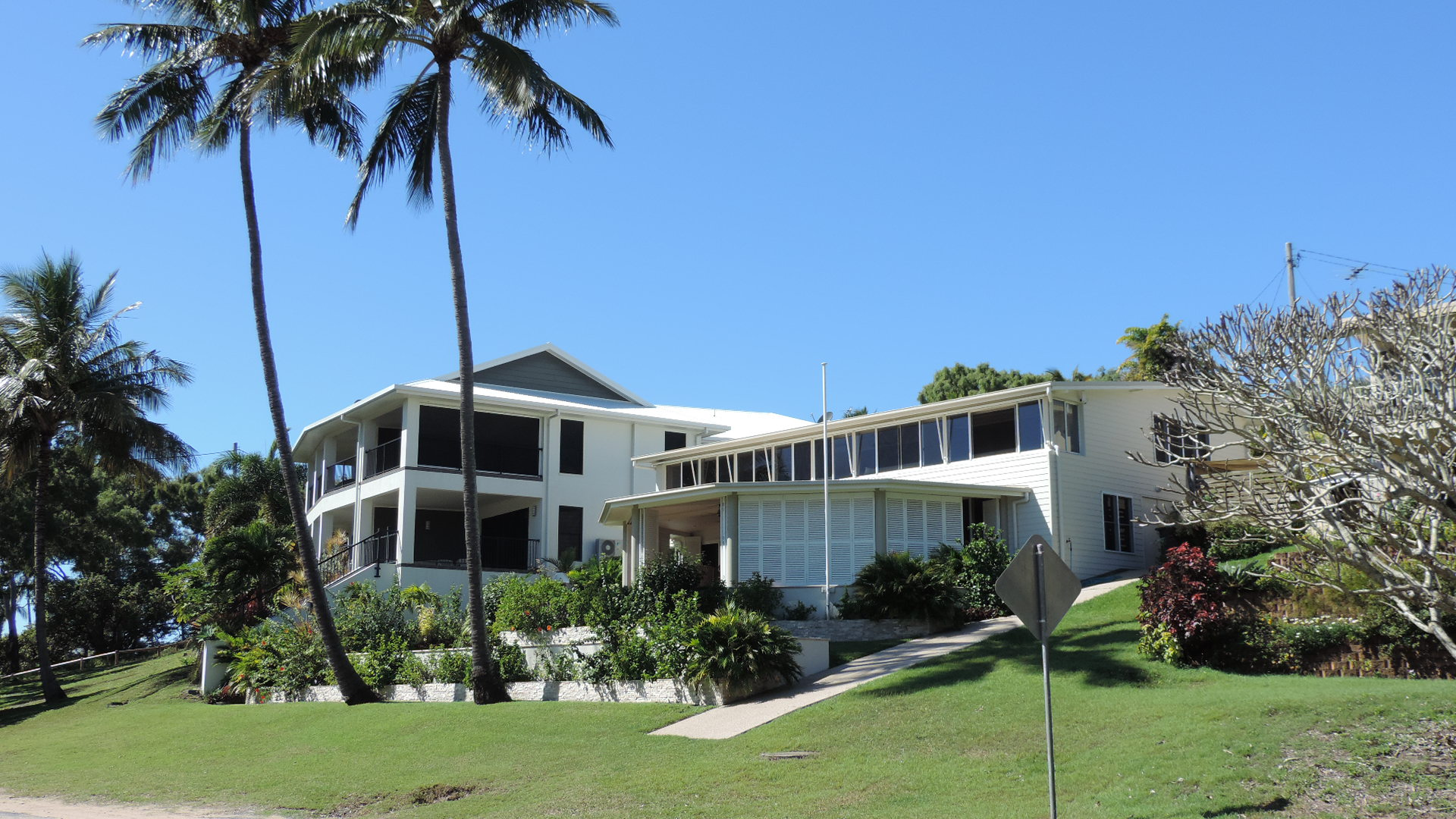
Houses on the O'Brien Esplanade, 2016

In the 2016 census, Shoal Point had a population of 977 people.

In the 2021 census, Shoal Point had a population of 1,104 people.

== Education ==
There are no schools in Shoal Point. The nearest government primary school is Bucasia State School in neighbouring Bucasia to the south-east. The nearest government secondary school is Mackay Northern Beaches State High School in Rural View to the south.

== Amenities ==
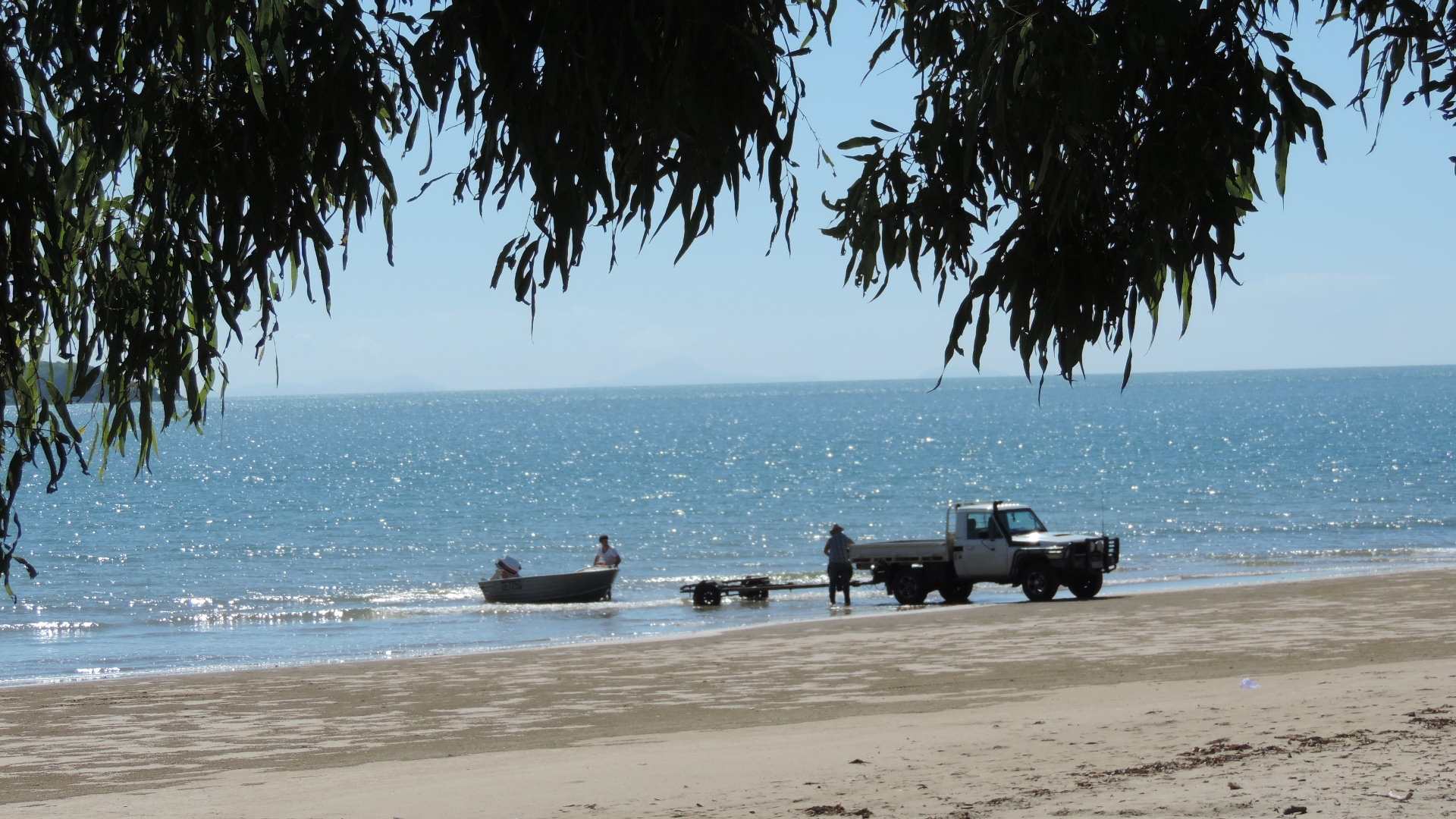
Boat launching, Shoal Point, 2016

The Mackay Regional Council operates a mobile library service on a fortnightly schedule at O'Brien Esplanade.

There is a boat ramp at the northern end of the O'Brien Esplanade (21.0010°S 149.1555°E).

There are a number of parks in the area (from north to south):

- Hodges Road Park (21.0032°S 149.1501°E)
- Cone Street Park (21.0035°S 149.1543°E)
- Nautilus Park (21.0113°S 149.1538°E)
- Dolphins Park (21.0356°S 149.1471°E)
