= Rosella, Queensland =

Rosella
- Suburb
- Interactive map of Rosella
- Coordinates: 21.2425°S 149.1452°E
- Country: Australia
- State: Queensland
- LGA: Mackay Region
- Location: 12.9 km (8.0 mi) SSW of Mackay CBD; 323 km (201 mi) NNW of Rockhampton; 396 km (246 mi) SE of Townsville; 963 km (598 mi) NNW of Brisbane

Government
  - State electorate: Mirani
  - Federal division: Capricornia

Area
  - Total: 8.5 km^{2} (3.3 sq mi)

Population
  - Total: 78 (2021 census)
  - Density: 9.18/km^{2} (23.77/sq mi)
- Time zone: UTC+10:00 (AEST)
- Postcode: 4740
Suburbs around Rosella
Bakers Creek	Bakers Creek	Bakers Creek
Sandiford	Rosella	McEwens Beach
Chelona	Chelona	Chelona

Rosella is a rural locality in the Mackay Region, Queensland, Australia. In the 2021 census, Rosella had a population of 78 people.

== Geography ==
The Bruce Highway enters the locality from the south (Chelona) and exits to north (Bakers Creek). The North Coast railway line enters the locality from the south-west (Chelona) and exits to the north-west (Bakers Creek) with Rosella railway station serving the locality (21.2399°S 149.1391°E).

The land use is predominantly growing sugarcane. There is a cane tramway network to transport the harvested sugarcane to the local sugar mill.

== Demographics ==
In the 2016 census, Rosella had a population of 85 people.

In the 2021 census, Rosella had a population of 78 people.

== Education ==
There are no schools in Rosella. The nearest government primary school is Chelona State School in neighbouring Chelona to the south. The nearest government secondary school is Mackay State High School in South Mackay to the north. There are also non-government schools in Mackay.
