= Sandiford, Queensland =

Sandiford
- Suburb
- Interactive map of Sandiford
- Coordinates: 21.2466°S 149.1025°E
- Country: Australia
- State: Queensland
- LGA: Mackay Region
- Location: 17.6 km (10.9 mi) SW of Mackay CBD; 967 km (601 mi) NNW of Brisbane

Government
  - State electorate: Mirani
  - Federal division: Capricornia

Area
  - Total: 25.2 km^{2} (9.7 sq mi)

Population
  - Total: 168 (2021 census)
  - Density: 6.67/km^{2} (17.27/sq mi)
- Time zone: UTC+10:00 (AEST)
- Postcode: 4740
Suburbs around Sandiford
Palmyra	Te Kowai	Bakers Creek
Homebush	Sandiford	Rosella; Chelona
Homebush	Balberra	Balberra

Sandiford is a rural locality in the Mackay Region, Queensland, Australia. In the 2021 census, Sandiford had a population of 168 people.

== History ==
Sandiford Provisional School opened on 5 October 1908. On 1 January 1909, it became Sandiford State School. It closed on 23 December 1992 due to falling enrolments. It was at 517 Homebush Road (21.24761°S 149.09981°E). As at 2008, the school building was still on the site.

== Demographics ==
In the 2016 census, Sandiford had a population of 175 people.

In the 2021 census, Sandiford had a population of 168 people.

== Education ==
There are no schools in Sandiford. The nearest government primary schools are Homebush State School in neighbouring Homebush to the south-west, Chelona State School in neighbouring Chelona to the east, and Dundula State School in neighbouring Bakers Creek to the north-east. The nearest government secondary school is Mackay State High School in South Mackay.
