= Sarina, Queensland =

Sarina
- Town
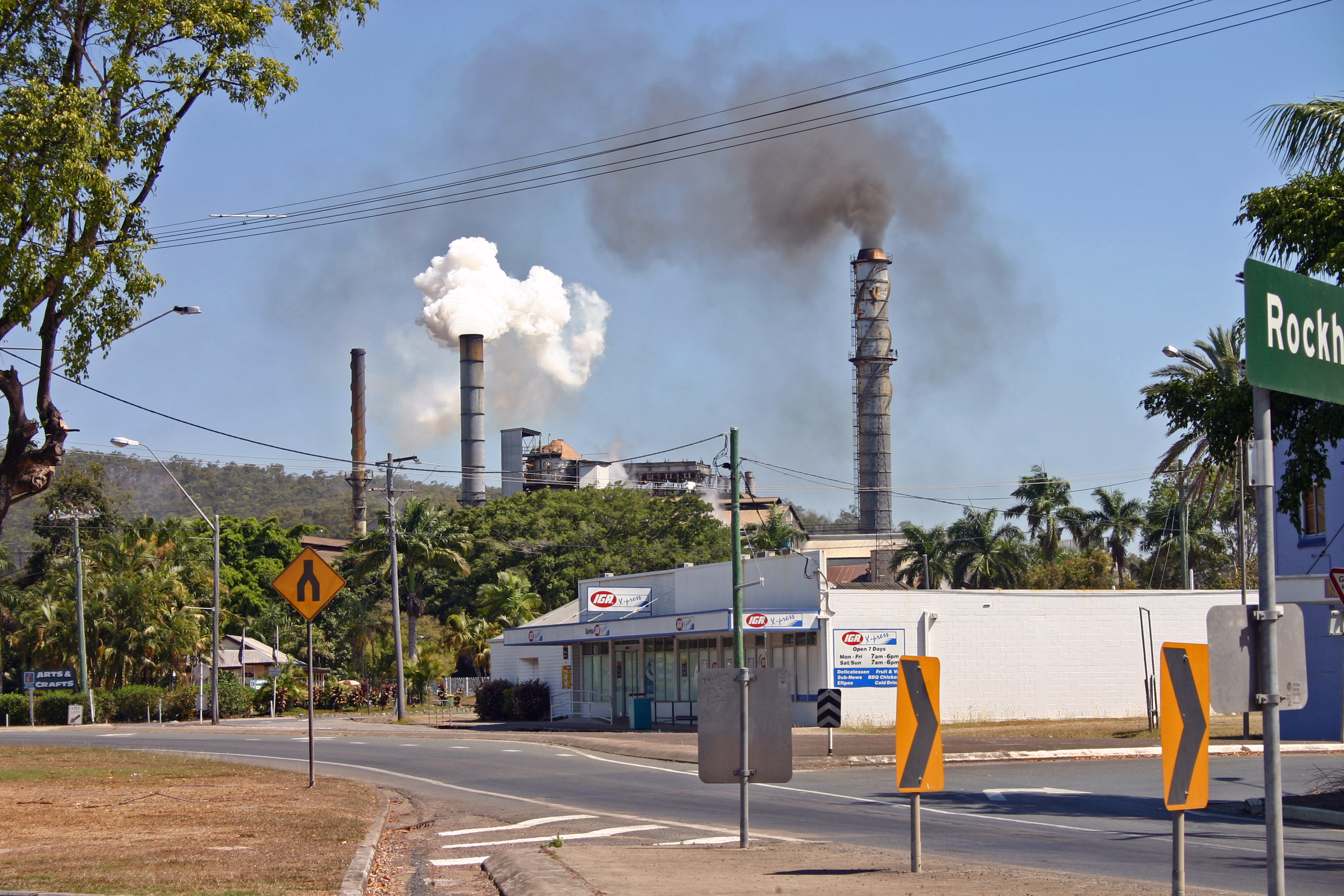
- Plane Creek Sugar Mill

- Interactive map of Sarina
- Coordinates: 21.4225°S 149.2175°E
- Country: Australia
- State: Queensland
- LGA: Mackay Region
- Location: 38.2 km (23.7 mi) S of Mackay; 301 km (187 mi) NNW of Rockhampton; 936 km (582 mi) NNW of Brisbane

Government
  - State electorate: Mirani
  - Federal division: Capricornia

Area
  - Total: 250.7 km^{2} (96.8 sq mi)

Population
  - Total: 5,619 (2021 census)
  - Density: 22.413/km^{2} (58.050/sq mi)
- Time zone: UTC+10:00 (AEST)
- Postcode: 4737
Localities around Sarina
| Sunnyside | Munburra; Alligator Creek | Grasstree Beach; Sarina Beach |
| Blue Mountain | Sarina | Freshwater Point; Armstrong Beach |
| Sarina Range | Koumala | Coral Sea |

Sarina /səˈriːnə/ is a rural town in the Mackay Region, Queensland, Australia. In the 2021 census, the locality of Sarina had a population of 5,619. Before being renamed Sarina in 1907, the early township had been called Plane Creek. It is situated on land that was traditionally occupied by the Yuwi people, who spoke Yuwibara language.

== Geography ==
Sarina lies just inland of the east coast of Queensland, 34 kilometres (21 mi) south of the city of Mackay, and approximately 300 kilometres (190 mi) north of the city of Rockhampton. The Bruce Highway passes through the locality from south to north, as does the North Coast railway line.

The town of Sarina is located on Plane Creek, which flows into the Coral Sea, but most of the urban development is on the northern side of the creek. The Bruce Highway and the railway line pass through the town, which is served by the Sarina railway station.

Plane Creek West (previously known as Plane Creek Upper) is a neighbourhood within the locality (21.4167°S 149.1667°E), approximately 5.5 kilometres (3.4 mi) west of the town of Sarina.

The neighbourhood of Oonooie lies 6.8 kilometres (4.2 mi) south of the town (21°28′00″S 149°13′59″E) and is the name of a former railway station on the North Coast line, which was named on 29 April 1915, reportedly after a principal clanswoman of that area.

The neighbourhood of Mount Convenient lies 4.8 kilometres (3.0 mi) north of the town (21°24′00″S 149°12′00″E) and is the name of a former railway station on the North Coast line, which was named on 30 October 1913 after a nearby peak, Mount Convenient.

The neighbourhood of Swayneville lies 9.9 kilometres (6.2 mi) south-west of the town (21°28′00″S 149°09′00″E).

The Goonyella railway line passes along the eastern boundary of the locality towards the Hay Point coal terminal.

Mount Chelona (204 metres (669 ft) above sea level) is located in the north of the locality near where the Bruce Highway exits the locality north to Alligator Creek.

The Marlborough–Sarina Road enters from the southwest.

== History ==
Yuwibara (also known as Yuibera, Yuri, Juipera, Yuwiburra) is an Australian Aboriginal language spoken on Yuwibara country. It is closely related to the Biri languages/dialects. The Yuwibara language region includes the landscape within the local government boundaries of the Mackay Region.

Sarina was originally known as Plane Creek, but took its present name from the Sarina Inlet which was in turn named after Sarina, the Greek mythological enchantress, by William Charles Borlase Wilson, a surveyor, some time before 1882.

Plane Creek Provisional School opened on 5 August 1897. In 1907 it became Plane Creek State School. In 1912 it was renamed Sarina State School. On 31 January 1956 a secondary department was added to the school, which operated until January 1964, when Sarina State High School opened.

Plane Creek Upper Provisional School opened in 1900 and closed in 1969. On 1 January 1909 it became Plane Creek Upper State School. In 1928 it was renamed Plane Creek West State School. It closed in 1969.

On Sunday 29 March 1908, the foundation block was laid for an Anglican church, adjacent to the court house. On Sunday 18 October 1908, the church was officially opened by Reverend T. Hely-Wilson. The church was dedicated to St Luke the Evangelist.

Hillside State School opened in 1909 and closed circa 1926.

Middle Creek Provisional School opened in 1915. In 1916 it was renamed Laburnum Grove Provisional School. It closed circa 1941.

St Anne's Catholic Primary School was officially opened on 23 May 1925 by the Sisters of Mercy.

Mount Chelona State School opened on 4 September 1933 and closed circa 1941.

Swayneville State School opened on 26 August 1935.

Sarina State High School opened on 28 January 1964. In 2014, the school celebrated its 50th anniversary.

At the 2006 census, Sarina had a population of 3,285.

In the 2011 census, Sarina had a population of 5,730.

On 24 October 2014 the former Mount Pelion State School building was moved to Sarina from the Northview State School in Mount Pleasant (where it was relocated in 1987) to be restored as part of the Sarina Art and Craft Centre in Railway Square.

In the 2016 census, the locality of Sarina had a population of 5,522.

In the 2021 census, the locality of Sarina had a population of 5,619.

== Heritage listings ==
Sarina has a number of heritage-listed sites, including:

- Broad Street (21.4222°S 149.2172°E): Sarina Air Raid Shelter
- Broad Street (21.4243°S 149.2178°E): Sarina War Memorial

== Economy ==
Industries include sugar cane growing and milling, cattle grazing and agriculture. It is a major supplier of ethanol through Wilmar International's Plane Creek sugar mill (21.4283°S 149.2162°E).

Approximately 15 kilometres (9 mi) north is the second largest export coal terminal in Australia, and one of the biggest coal distribution terminals in the world, Hay Point.

== Education ==
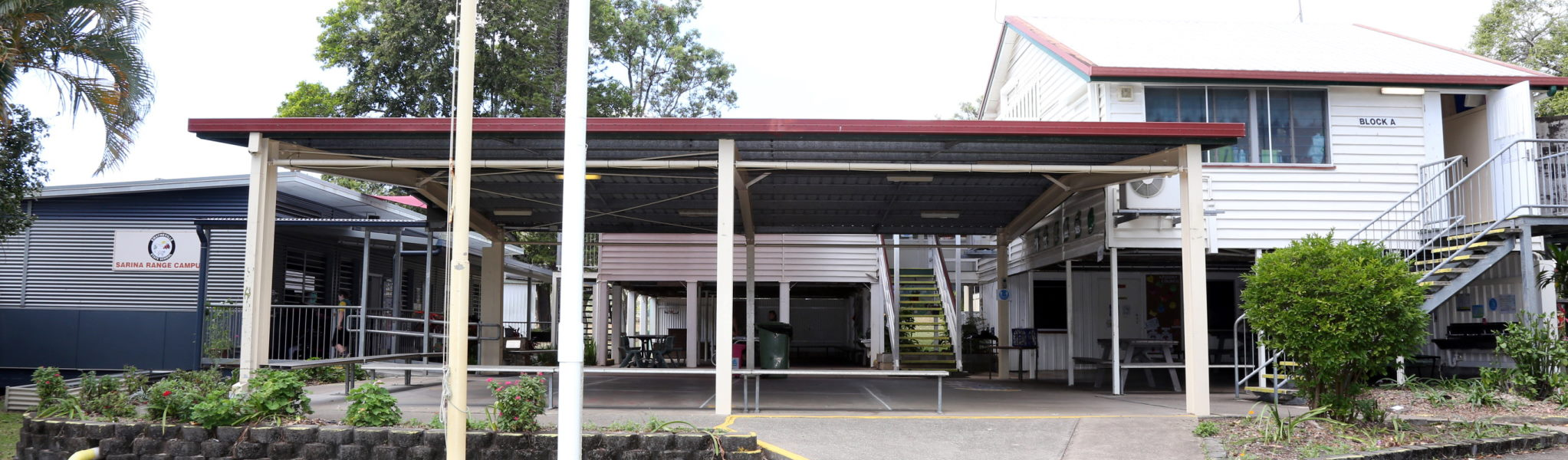
Swayneville State School, 2021

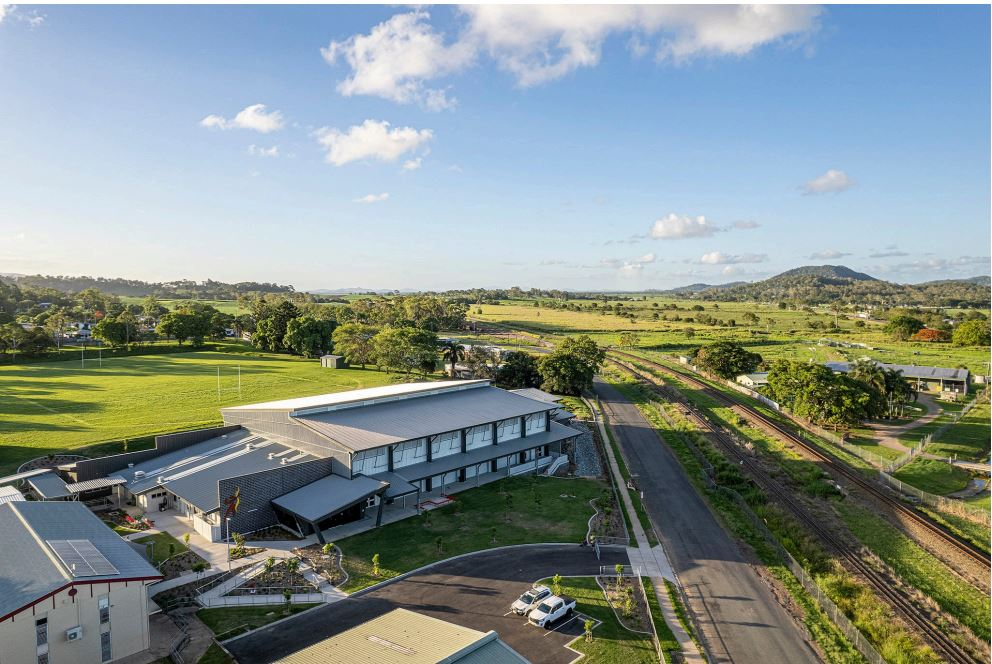
Sarina State High School, 2021

Sarina State School is a government primary (Prep–6) school for boys and girls at Broad Street (21.4222°S 149.2174°E). In 2017, the school had an enrolment of 465 students with 35 teachers (33 full-time equivalent) and 24 non-teaching staff (17 full-time equivalent). It includes a special education program.

Swayneville State School is a government primary (Prep–6) school for boys and girls at 952 Sarina Marlborough Road (21.4726°S 149.1440°E). In 2017, the school had an enrolment of 112 students with 12 teachers (10 full-time equivalent) and 11 non-teaching staff (6 full-time equivalent). It includes a special education program.

St Anne's Catholic Primary School is a Catholic primary (Prep–6) school for boys and girls at 3 Range Road (21.4243°S 149.2143°E). In 2017, the school had an enrolment of 210 students with 20 teachers (17 full-time equivalent) and 15 non-teaching staff (7 full-time equivalent).

Sarina State High School is a government secondary (7–12) school for boys and girls at Anzac Street (21.4208°S 149.2136°E). In 2017, the school had an enrolment of 743 students with 64 teachers (61 full-time equivalent) and 43 non-teaching staff (27 full-time equivalent). It includes a special education program.

== Amenities ==
The Mackay Regional Council operates a library at 65 Broad Street (21.4213°S 149.2166°E) and operates a mobile library service on a fortnightly schedule at Swayneville near the school. The library facility opened in 1984 with a major refurbishment in 2013.

The Sarina branch of the Queensland Country Women's Association meets at the QCWA Hall at 2 Broad Street (21.4257°S 149.2187°E).

There are a number of churches in Sarina, including:

- St Michael's Catholic Church at 1 Range Road (21.4238°S 149.2142°E)
- St Luke's Anglican Church at 58 Broad Street (21.4212°S 149.2172°E)
- Sarina Uniting Church at 7 Range Road (21.4243°S 149.2137°E)
- Wesleyan Methodist Church at 87 Range Road (21.4315°S 149.2068°E)
- Sarina Presbyterian Church at 23 Sarina Beach Road (21.4154°S 149.2187°E)
- New Life Church at 1 Leslie Street (21.42312°S 149.2140°E)

== Sport ==
Sarina is home of the Sarina Crocodiles, a Rugby league club, producing Queensland representative players including Martin Bella, Dale Shearer, Kevin Campion, Daly Cherry-Evans and dual international Wendell Sailor.

== Attractions ==
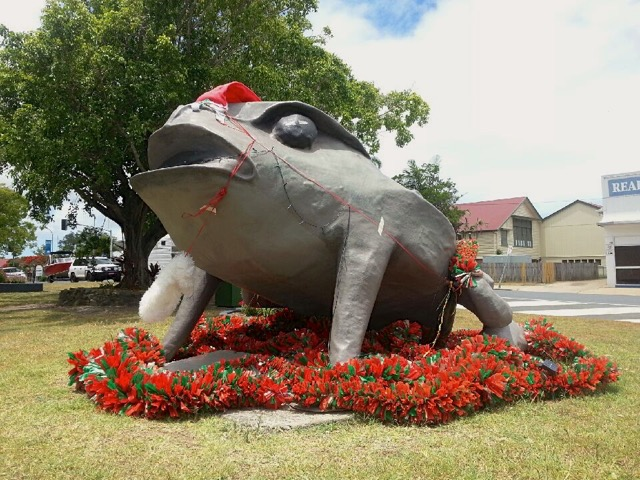
Buffy, the Big Cane Toad

A large cane toad statue, called Buffy, is situated in the town centre on the Bruce Highway (21.4226°S 149.2173°E) in honour of Sarina's cane farming history. Buffy was made from fibreglass in the early 1980s for a parade float for the Apex Sugar Festival. The name Buffy comes from the species name bufo marinus. Buffy has been painted for the "state of origin" football game multiple times and has even been stolen. To try and deter further theft, buffy has been chained to the concrete slab on broad street where he resides, though this hasn't stopped people from decorating Buffy with "Queenslander" flags and state of origin banners.

The Sarina Arts & Craft Centre is at 1 Railway Square (21.4263°S 149.2175°E) adjacent to the Mackay Region Visitor Information Centre. It occupies three historic buildings: the old court house built in 1906, the old jail built circa 1906, and the former Mount Pelion State School building built 1926.

Sarina Museum is also in Railway Square (21.4267°S 149.2176°E) in the former Catholic presbytery relocated to this site in 2001.

Also in Railway Square is the Sarina Sugar Shed (21.4275°S 149.2177°E), an information centre about the sugar industry. It shows how sugar is grown and processed using a working miniature sugar mill into an array of products.

== Notable people from Sarina ==
- Martin Bella – former professional rugby league player, represented Queensland and Australia
- Kevin Campion – former professional rugby league player, represented Queensland
- Daly Cherry-Evans – professional rugby league player, represented Queensland and Australia
- Brianna Clark - professional women's rugby league player, NRLW 2025 premiership winner, represented Queensland and New Zealand
- Wendell Sailor – former professional rugby league and Rugby union player
- Dale Shearer – former professional rugby league player, represented Queensland and Australia

== See also ==
- Sarina railway station
- List of tramways in Queensland
