= Dunnrock, Queensland =

Dunnrock
- Suburb
- Interactive map of Dunnrock
- Coordinates: 21.265°S 149.1816°E
- Country: Australia
- State: Queensland
- LGA: Mackay Region
- Location: 20.0 km (12.4 mi) S of Mackay CBD; 970 km (600 mi) NNW of Brisbane

Government
  - State electorate: Mirani
  - Federal division: Dawson

Area
  - Total: 11.2 km^{2} (4.3 sq mi)

Population
  - Total: 58 (2021 census)
  - Density: 5.18/km^{2} (13.41/sq mi)
- Time zone: UTC+10:00 (AEST)
- Postcode: 4740
Suburbs around Dunnrock
McEwens Beach	McEwens Beach	McEwens Beach
Chelona	Dunnrock	McEwens Beach
Balberra	Balberra	Balberra

Dunnrock is a coastal rural locality in the Mackay Region, Queensland, Australia. In the 2021 census, Dunnrock had a population of 58 people.

== Geography ==
The locality is bounded to the south and south-east by the meandering Sandy Creek, which flows into Sandringham Bay (21.2498°S 149.2219°E) of the Coral Sea, which forms the eastern boundary of the locality.

Most of the south of the locality is within Sandringham Bay Conservation Park except for a small residential area (the former town) at the mouth of the creek (21.27238°S 149.18402°E). The land use in the west of the locality is growing sugarcane. The land in the east nearest the coast is marshland with the centre of the locality being used for grazing on native vegetation.

== History ==
The locality was named after farmer Samuel Dunn, who cut a track to the township site. Dunn was the lessee of Portion 8V, Parish of Chelona. The locality was officially named and bounded on 3 September 1999.

== Demographics ==
In the 2016 census, Dunnrock had a population of 75 people.

In the 2021 census, Dunnrock had a population of 58 people.

== Education ==
There are no schools in Dunnrock. The nearest government primary school is Chelona State School in neighbouring Chelona to the west. The nearest government secondary school is Mackay State High School in South Mackay.

== Amenities ==
There is a boat ramp on Dunrock Esplanade is a boat ramp on the north bank of Sandy Creek (21.2731°S 149.1837°E). It is managed by the Mackay Regional Council.
