= Mount Martin National Park =

National park in Australia

- IUCN category II (national park)
- Location within Queensland
- Location: Queensland
- Coordinates: 21°04′19″S 148°49′46″E
- Area: 4.76 km^{2} (1.84 sq mi)
- Established: 1994
- Governing body: Queensland Parks and Wildlife Service

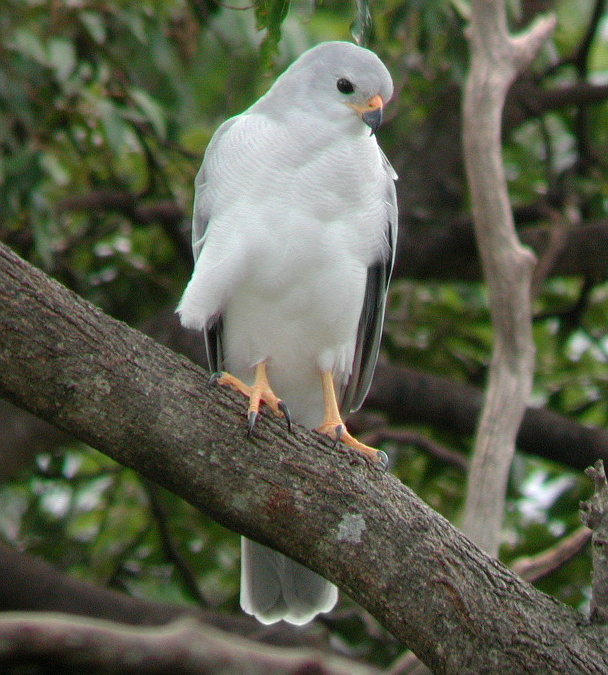
Grey goshawk, endemic to coastal Australia.

Mount Martin is a national park in Queensland, Australia, 829 km northwest of Brisbane.

== See also ==
- Protected areas of Queensland
