= Mount Ossa National Park =

National park in Queensland, Australia

- IUCN category II (national park)
- Location within Queensland
- Location: Queensland
- Coordinates: 20°58′45″S 148°49′12″E
- Area: 4.96 km^{2} (1.92 sq mi)
- Established: 1994
- Governing body: Queensland Parks and Wildlife Service

Mount Ossa is a national park in Queensland, Australia, 838 km northwest of Brisbane.

There is rainforest with hoop pines.

== See also ==
- Protected areas of Queensland
