= Pioneer Peaks National Park =

National park in Australia

- IUCN category II (national park)
- Location within Queensland
- Location: Queensland
- Coordinates: 20°59′02″S 148°55′26″E
- Area: 18.40 km^{2} (7.10 sq mi)
- Established: 1992
- Governing body: Queensland Parks and Wildlife Service

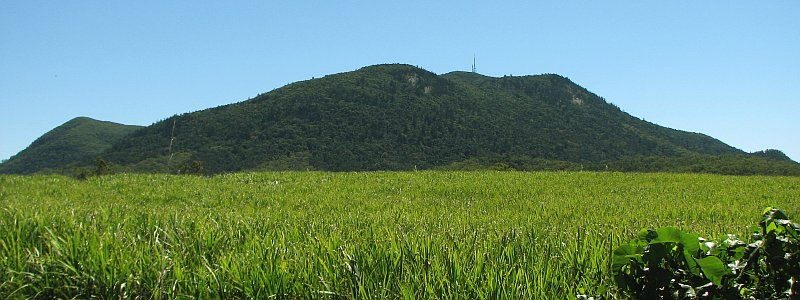
Mount Blackwood

Pioneer Peaks is a national park in Queensland, Australia, 833 km northwest of Brisbane.

== See also ==
- Protected areas of Queensland
