= Reliance Creek National Park =

National park in Australia

- IUCN category II (national park)
- Location within Queensland
- Location: Queensland
- Nearest city: Mackay, Australia
- Coordinates: 21°02′52″S 149°05′59″E
- Area: 0.14 km^{2} (0.054 sq mi)
- Established: 1980
- Governing body: Queensland Parks and Wildlife Service

Reliance Creek is a national park in Queensland, Australia, 818 km northwest of Brisbane and about 17 km north-east of Mackay.

Contains remnant palm forest that was once common to the coastal plain. It is the most intact example of coastal palm forest in the region, an ecosystem that was once prolific.

== See also ==
- Protected areas of Queensland
