= Chelona, Queensland =

Chelona
- Suburb
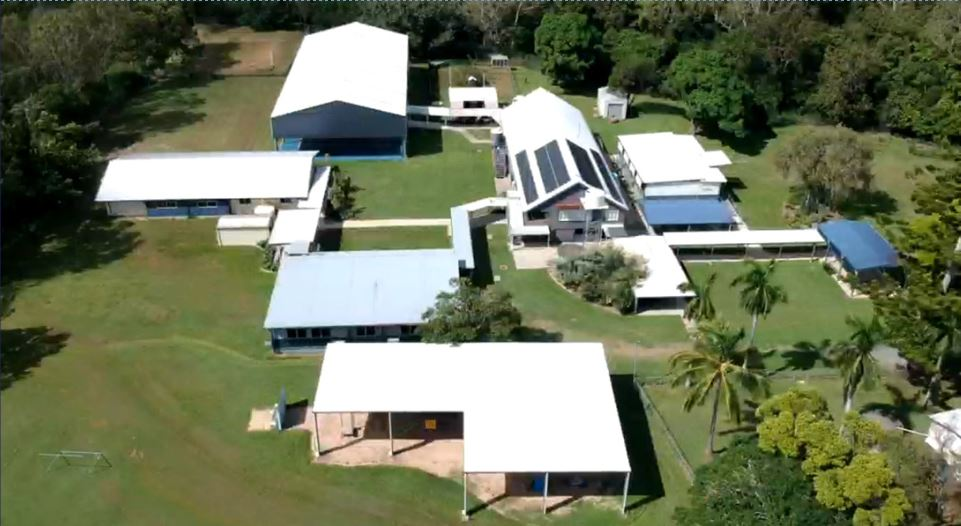
- Chelona State School, 2024

- Interactive map of Chelona
- Coordinates: 21.2588°S 149.1416°E
- Country: Australia
- State: Queensland
- LGA: Mackay Region
- Location: 16.6 km (10.3 mi) S of Mackay; 323 km (201 mi) NNW of Rockhampton; 399 km (248 mi) SE of Townsville; 941 km (585 mi) NNW of Brisbane

Government
  - State electorate: Mirani
  - Federal divisions: Capricornia; Dawson

Area
  - Total: 9.8 km^{2} (3.8 sq mi)

Population
  - Total: 120 (2021 census)
  - Density: 12.2/km^{2} (31.7/sq mi)
- Time zone: UTC+10:00 (AEST)
- Postcode: 4740
Suburbs around Chelona
Sandiford	Rosella	McEwens Beach
Sandiford	Chelona	Dunnrock
Balberra	Balberra	Dunnrock

Chelona is a rural locality in the Mackay Region, Queensland, Australia. In the 2021 census, Chelona had a population of 120 people.

== Geography ==
The locality is bounded to the south by Sandy Creek.

The Bruce Highway enters the locality from the south (Balberra) and exits to the north (Rosella). The North Coast railway line also enters the locality from the south and exits to the north, further west than the highway. There is also a network of cane tramways that transports harvested sugarcane to the sugar mills.

The predominant land use is sugarcane farming. Most of the residential development is along the Bruce Highway.

== History ==
The now-abandoned Chelona railway station (21.2579°S 149.1320°E) on the North Coast railway line was named on 30 October 1913 after Mount Chelona (21.3778°S 149.2106°E), which was named by surveyor William Charles Borlase Wilson. The locality takes its name from the railway station.

Chelona State School opened on 23 January 1893.

A postal receiving office opened at Chelona in August 1902. It became a post office on 1 July 1927 and closed on 2 March 1964.

== Demographics ==
In the 2016 census, Chelona had a population of 100 people.

In the 2021 census, Chelona had a population of 120 people.

== Education ==
Chelona State School is a government primary (Prep-6) school for boys and girls at 13 Chelona School Access Road (21.2603°S 149.1451°E). In 2018, the school had an enrolment of 107 students with 8 teachers (6 full-time equivalent) and 7 non-teaching staff (4 full-time equivalent).

There is no secondary school in Chelona. The nearest government secondary school is Mackay State High School in South Mackay to the north.

== Amenities ==
The Mackay Regional Council operates a mobile library service on a fortnightly schedule at Dunrock Road near the school.
