= Sarina State High School =

Coordinates: 21°25′13.14″S 149°12′45.4″E

- Sarina, Queensland; Australia

Information
- Type: Public
- Motto: Imagine Believe Together Achieve
- Established: 31 January 1956
- Principal: Jane Grieger
- Enrolment: ~600
- Campus: Urban
- Colours: Maroon, white and yellow
- Website: sarinashs.eq.edu.au

Sarina State High School is located in the small rural town of Sarina, Queensland, Australia. The school had 600 students in 2013 with a reported 20 percent continuing studies at University.

Sarina State High previously boasted a marine aquarium with a reef tank, freshwater tank, an estuarine tank, and a touch tank where students can get a literal "feel" for marine life.

There is a A$659 vocational qualifications agricultural initiative completed at the school that has national ministerial support.

Sarina High School has produced 4 State of Origin Representatives: Dale Shearer, Kevin Campion, Wendell Sailor and Reuben Cotter. Radio host Paul Campion is also an alum.
