= County of Carlisle =

Carlisle Queensland
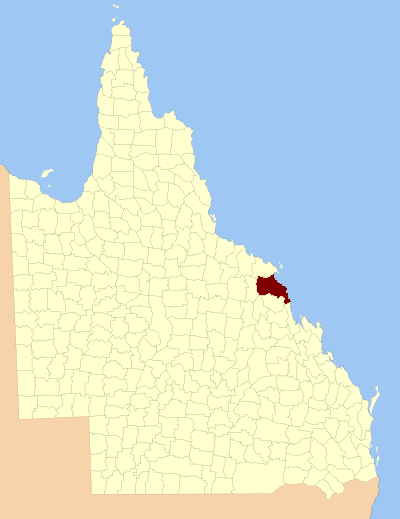
- Location within Queensland
Lands administrative divisions around Carlisle:
Herbert	Herbert	Coral Sea
Drake	Carlisle	Coral Sea
Grosvenor	Wodehouse	Murchison

The County of Carlisle is a county (a cadastral division) in Queensland, Australia. The county is centred on the city of Mackay and includes most of the Mackay Region. It takes its name from Carlisle in England.

On 7 March 1901, the Governor issued a proclamation legally dividing Queensland into counties under the Land Act 1897. Its schedule described Carlisle thus:

Bounded on the south by the counties of Murchison, Wodehouse and Grosvenor; on the west by the eastern boundaries of Suttor Creek and Cerito portion B Resumption, Byerwen Consolidation and Havilah Lease, part of the south and the east boundaries of Sonomo Resumption, and by the east boundary of Henry O.L.; on the north by the south boundaries of Ellen Valley Consolidations, parts of the west and north boundaries of the Normanby Gold Field, part of the west and the south boundaries of Mountain Home Lease, the south boundary of Mountain Home Resumption, part of the north-west, the south and east boundaries of Bromby Park Lease to the Andromache River, by that river and the O'Connell River downwards to the sea-coast; and on the east by the sea-coast,—inclusive of all adjacent islands.

== Parishes ==
Carlisle is divided into parishes, as listed below:

Parish	LGA	Coordinates	Towns
Abingdon	Mackay	21°12′S 148°54′E	Marian, Mirani
Bassett	Mackay	21°05′S 149°07′E	North Mackay, Andergrove, Bucasia, Slade Point
Beverley	Mackay	21°21′S 149°45′E	(offshore)
Bloomsbury	Mackay	20°40′S 148°38′E	Bloomsbury
Bong Bong	Mackay	21°20′S 148°45′E	
Chelona	Mackay	21°15′S 149°08′E	Chelona, Homebush
Eton	Mackay	21°19′S 149°00′E	Eton
Greenmount	Mackay	21°10′S 149°03′E	Walkerston
Hamilton	Mackay	21°07′S 148°51′E	
Hampden	Mackay	21°04′S 149°00′E	Hampden, Habana
Hazledean	Mackay	21°21′S 148°53′E	
Hector	Mackay	21°20′S 149°14′E	Hay Point, Sarina Beach
Homebush	Mackay	21°21′S 149°06′E	Munbura
Howard	Mackay	21°11′S 149°10′E	Mackay, Bakers Creek
Ingot	Mackay	20°42′S 149°10′E	(offshore)
Kelvin	Mackay	21°39′S 149°14′E	Koumala
Lacy	Mackay	20°54′S 148°39′E	Yalboroo
Macartney	Mackay	20°41′S 148°31′E	
Marton	Mackay	20°57′S 150°05′E	(offshore)
Mia Mia	Mackay	21°12′S 148°39′E	Finch Hatton, Pinnacle
Mount Funnel	Mackay	21°35′S 149°21′E	Cape Palmerston NP
Ossa	Mackay	20°58′S 148°55′E	Seaforth, Kuttabul, Mount Ossa
Pelion	Mackay	21°04′S 148°39′E	
Sarina	Mackay	21°27′S 149°11′E	Sarina, Armstrong Beach
St Helens	Mackay	20°52′S 148°46′E	Calen, Pindi Pindi
Teemburra	Mackay	21°19′S 148°37′E	

== See also ==
- Lands administrative divisions of Queensland

== External links ==
- "Map of the County of Carlisle (sheet 1)". Queensland Government. 1923.
- "Map of the County of Carlisle (sheet 2)". Queensland Government. 1923.
