= Cape Hillsborough =

Cape Hillsborough may refer to:

- Cape Hillsborough, Queensland, a locality in the Mackay Region, Queensland, Australia
- Cape Hillsborough National Park, a national park in the Mackay Region, Queensland, Australia
