= Belmunda, Queensland =

Belmunda
- Suburb
- Interactive map of Belmunda
- Coordinates: 20.9497°S 149.0163°E
- Country: Australia
- State: Queensland
- LGA: Mackay Region
- Location: 14.8 km (9.2 mi) SE of Seaforth; 42.5 km (26.4 mi) NW of Mackay CBD; 374 km (232 mi) NNW of Rockhampton; 1,012 km (629 mi) NNW of Brisbane

Government
  - State electorate: Whitsunday
  - Federal division: Dawson

Area
  - Total: 3.2 km^{2} (1.2 sq mi)

Population
  - Total: 6 (2021 census)
  - Density: 1.88/km^{2} (4.9/sq mi)
- Time zone: UTC+10:00 (AEST)
- Postcode: 4740
Suburbs around Belmunda
Cape Hillsborough	Cape Hillsborough	Coral Sea
Cape Hillsborough	Belmunda	Coral Sea
Mount Jukes	Coral Sea	Coral Sea

Belmunda is a coastal locality in the Mackay Region, Queensland, Australia. In the 2021 census, Belmunda had a population of 6 people.

== Geography ==
Sand Bay (part of the Coral Sea, 20.950°S 149.054°E) forms the eastern boundary and part of the southern boundary of the locality. The eastern coastline is sandy and known as Belmunda Beach (20.9510°S 149.0273°E).

Most of the locality is low-lying marshland, apart from a number of hills in the south-eastern peninsula. The only significant land use is some beachside housing at the base of the hills (20.9530°S 149.0278°E). This housing is accessed via Belmunda Road which enters the locality from the south-west (Mount Jukes) and travels east around the base of the hills towards the beach.

== Demographics ==
In the 2016 census, Belmunda had a population of 7 people.

In the 2021 census, Belmunda had a population of 6 people.

== Education ==
There are no schools in Belmunda. The nearest government primary school is Seaforth State School in Seaforth to the north-west. The nearest government secondary school is Mackay North State High School in North Mackay to the south-east. There are numerous non-government primary and secondary schools in Mackay and its suburbs.
