= Kuttabul =

Kuttabul may refer to:

- HMAS Kuttabul (naval base)
- HMAS Kuttabul (ship)
- Kuttabul, Queensland
