= St Helens Beach, Queensland =

St Helens Beach
- Town
- Interactive map of St Helens Beach
- Coordinates: 20.8358°S 148.8405°E
- Country: Australia
- State: Queensland
- LGA: Mackay Region
- Location: 15.4 km (9.6 mi) NE of Calen; 68.0 km (42.3 mi) NW of Mackay CBD; 1,029 km (639 mi) NNW of Brisbane

Government
  - State electorate: Whitsunday
  - Federal division: Dawson

Area
  - Total: 39.1 km^{2} (15.1 sq mi)

Population
  - Total: 175 (2021 census)
  - Density: 4.476/km^{2} (11.59/sq mi)
- Time zone: UTC+10:00 (AEST)
- Postcode: 4798
Localities around St Helens Beach
Mentmore	Mentmore	Coral Sea
Pindi Pindi	St Helens Beach	Coral Sea
Calen	Calen	Coral Sea

St Helens Beach is a coastal town and locality in the Mackay Region, Queensland, Australia. In the 2021 census, the locality of St Helens Beach had a population of 175 people.

== History ==
Yuwibara (also known as Yuibera, Yuri, Juipera, Yuwiburra) is an Australian Aboriginal language spoken on Yuwibara country. It is closely related to the Biri languages/dialects. The Yuwibara language region includes the landscape within the local government boundaries of the Mackay Region.

Giya (also known as Kia) is a language of North Queensland. The Giya language region includes the landscape within the local government boundaries of the Whitsunday Regional Council, particularly the towns of Bowen and Proserpine.

The town was originally known as Wootaroo but was changed to St Helens by the Queensland Place Names Board on 1 April 1973 and then changed from St Helens to St Helens Beach on 2 September 1989. St Helens was the name of a pastoral run founded by pastoralists R. W. Graham and brothers John and William Macartney in the 1870s. The word beach is a reference to the sandy beach along the coastline of the Coral Sea.

== Demographics ==
In the 2016 census, the locality of St Helens Beach had a population of 197 people.

In the 2021 census, the locality of St Helens Beach had a population of 175 people.

== Education ==
There are no schools in St Helens Beach. The nearest government primary schools are Calen District State College in neighbouring Calen to the south and Pindi Pindi State School in neighbouring Pindi Pindi to the west. The nearest government secondary school is Calen District State College (to Year 12).
