= Mount Jukes, Queensland =

Mount Jukes
- Suburb
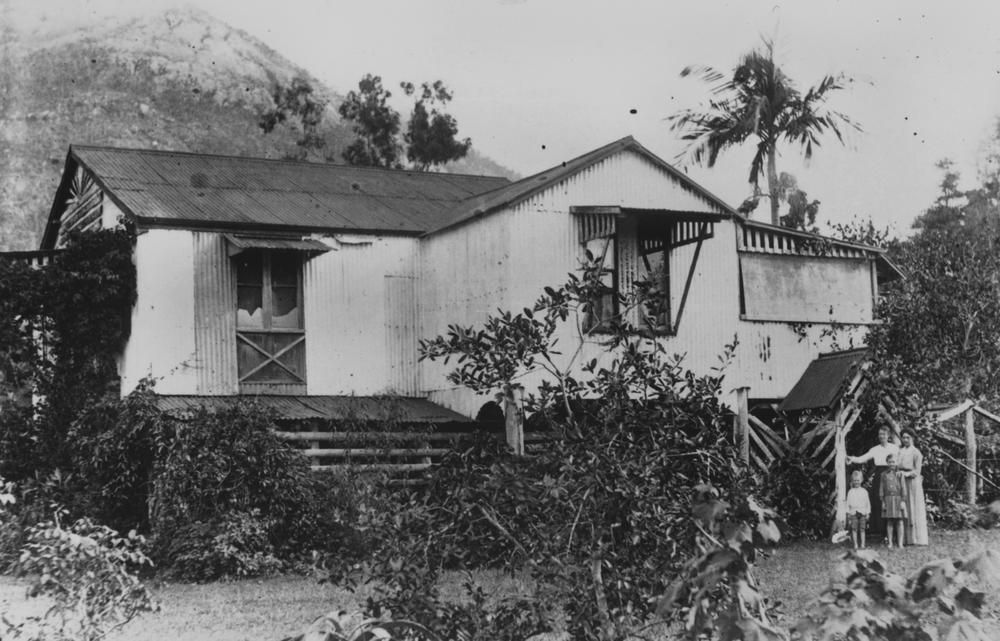
- The house "Inglenook" with the mountain in the background, 1909

- Interactive map of Mount Jukes
- Coordinates: 20.9805°S 148.9716°E
- Country: Australia
- State: Queensland
- LGA: Mackay Region
- Location: 8.6 km (5.3 mi) S of Seaforth; 35.1 km (21.8 mi) NW of North Mackay; 41.1 km (25.5 mi) NW of Mackay CBD; 1,012 km (629 mi) NNW of Brisbane

Government
  - State electorate: Whitsunday
  - Federal division: Dawson

Area
  - Total: 75.3 km^{2} (29.1 sq mi)

Population
  - Total: 373 (2021 census)
  - Density: 4.954/km^{2} (12.830/sq mi)
- Time zone: UTC+10:00 (AEST)
- Postcode: 4740
Suburbs around Mount Jukes
| Seaforth | Ball Bay | Cape Hillsborough; Belmunda |
| Kuttabul | Mount Jukes | Coral Sea |
| Kuttabul | Kuttabul | The Leap |

Mount Jukes is a mountain and surrounding coastal rural locality north of Mackay in the Mackay Region, Queensland, Australia. In the 2021 census, Mount Jukes had a population of 373 people.

== Geography ==
The locality is bounded to the east by the Coral Sea, to the south-east by Constant Creek which flows into the Coral Sea, and to the south-west by Nielson Creek, a tributary of Constant Creek.

There are three sections of the Pioneer Peaks National Park in the west, south-west and south of the locality.

The mountain Mount Jukes is located in the south-west of the locality (20.9978°S 148.9492°E) within the south-western section of the national park and the Central Mackay Coast IBRA Region. It rises to 547 metres (1,795 ft) above sea level and is composed of igneous rock that has been weathered and eroded.

Mount Adder is another mountain within the western section of the national park (20.9834°S 148.9188°E) rising to 380 metres (1,250 ft). The mountains originated from volcanic activity approximately 32 million years ago.

Apart from the national parks, the land use is a mixture of crop growing (mostly sugarcane), grazing on native vegetation and rural residential housing.

Offshore is Sand Bay (20.950°S 149.054°E).

Yakapari-Seaforth Road enters the locality from the south (Kuttabul) and exits to the north-west (Seaforth). There is a network of cane tramways in the locality to transport the harvested sugarcane to the local sugar mills operated by Mackay Sugar.

Mount Jukes has a species of shrubs growing in its trees called the Mount Blackwood holly (Graptophyllum ilicifolium), a species only found in Mount Blackwood area.

== History ==
Mount Jukes was named by George Elphinstone Dalrymple in 1862 after geologist Joseph Beete Jukes, who served as a naturalist on the explorations of HMS Fly from 1842 to 1846.

In 1896, Harold Forster Blaxland had purchased land on Mount Jukes to open a coffee plantation. Eight acres of coffee plants were planted in 1897 and a further seven was planted in the following years. Due to financial struggles the coffee plantation closed in 1919.

== Demographics ==
In the 2016 census, Mount Jukes had a population of 394 people.

In the 2021 census, Mount Jukes had a population of 373 people.

== Education ==
There are no schools in Mount Jukes. The nearest government primary schools are Seaforth State School in neighbouring Seaforth to the north-west and Hampden State School in neighbouring Hampden to the south. The nearest government secondary schools is Mackay North State High School in North Mackay to the south-east.

== Amenities ==
There is a boat ramp in Howell's Road into Constant Creek (21.0097°S 148.9974°E). It is managed by the Mackay Regional Council.

== See also ==
- List of mountains in Australia
