= Cape Hillsborough, Queensland =

Cape Hillsborough
- Suburb
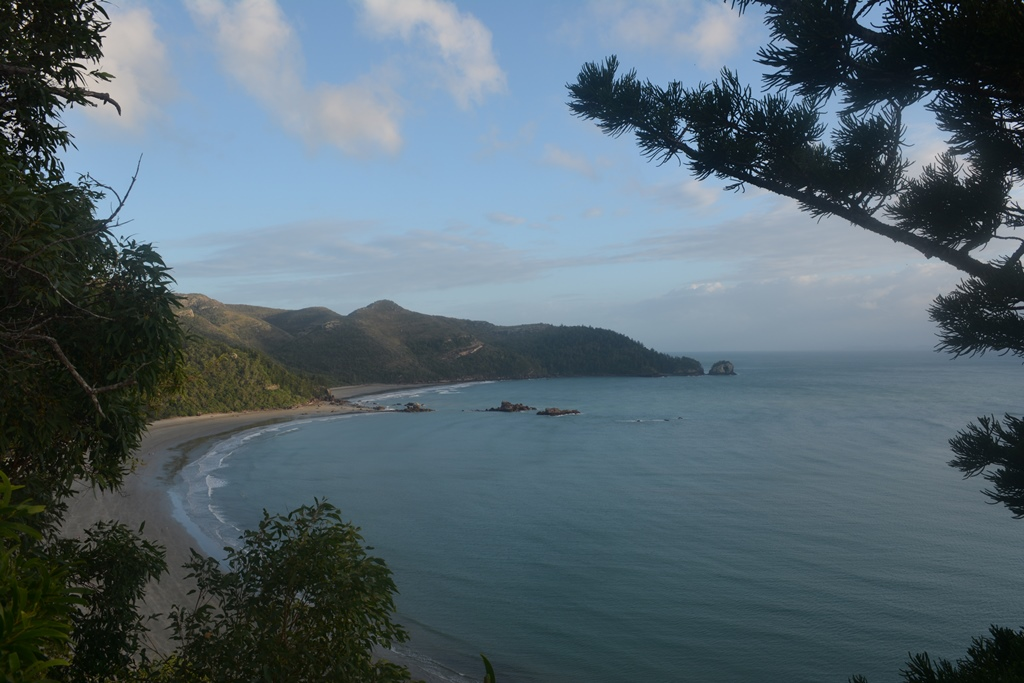
- View from Twin Beaches Lookout, 2015

- Interactive map of Cape Hillsborough
- Coordinates: 20.9136°S 149.0283°E
- Country: Australia
- State: Queensland
- LGA: Mackay Region
- Location: 9.1 km (5.7 mi) SE of Seaforth; 48.8 km (30.3 mi) NW of Mackay; 1,010 km (630 mi) NNW of Brisbane

Government
  - State electorate: Whitsunday
  - Federal division: Dawson

Area
  - Total: 11.7 km^{2} (4.5 sq mi)

Population
  - Total: 39 (2021 census)
  - Density: 3.33/km^{2} (8.63/sq mi)
- Time zone: UTC+10:00 (AEST)
- Postcode: 4740
Suburbs around Cape Hillsborough
| Coral Sea | Coral Sea | Coral Sea |
| Ball Bay | Cape Hillsborough | Coral Sea |
| Mount Jukes | Belmunda | Coral Sea |

Cape Hillsborough is a coastal locality in the Mackay Region, Queensland, Australia. In the 2021 census, Cape Hillsborough had a population of 39 people.

== Geography ==
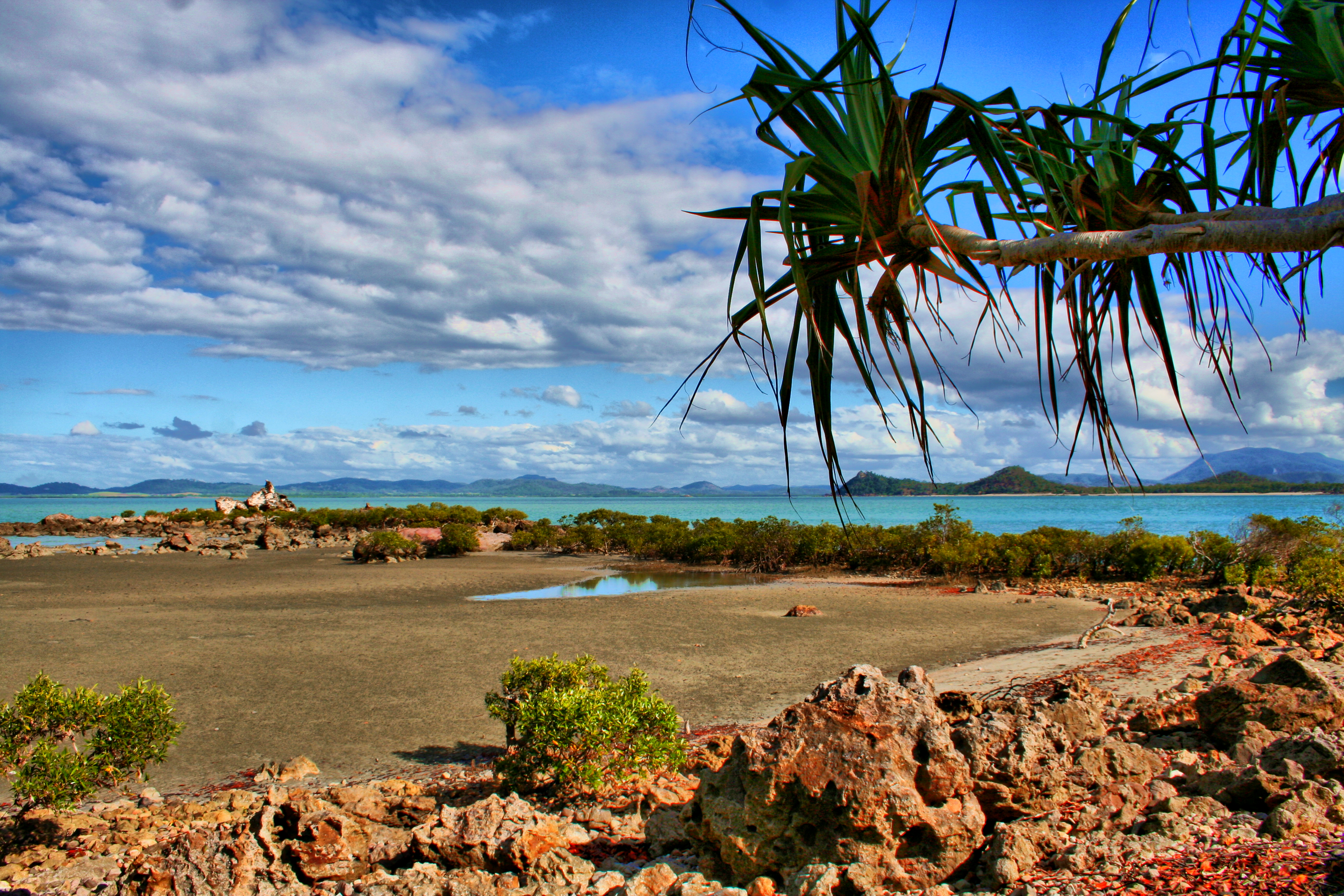
Cape Hillsborough national park, 2010

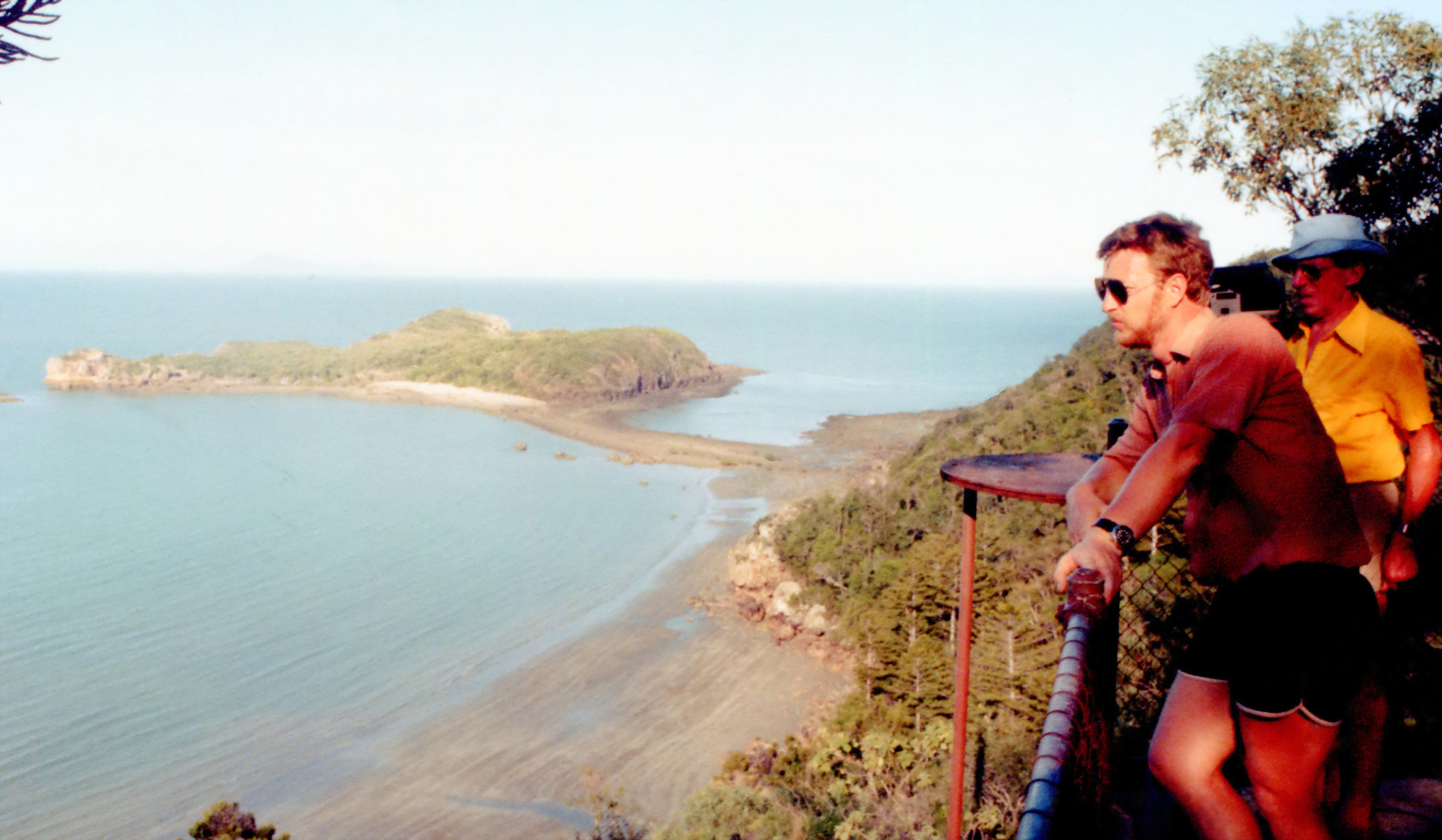
Wedge Island, accessible by a causeway at low tide, 2013

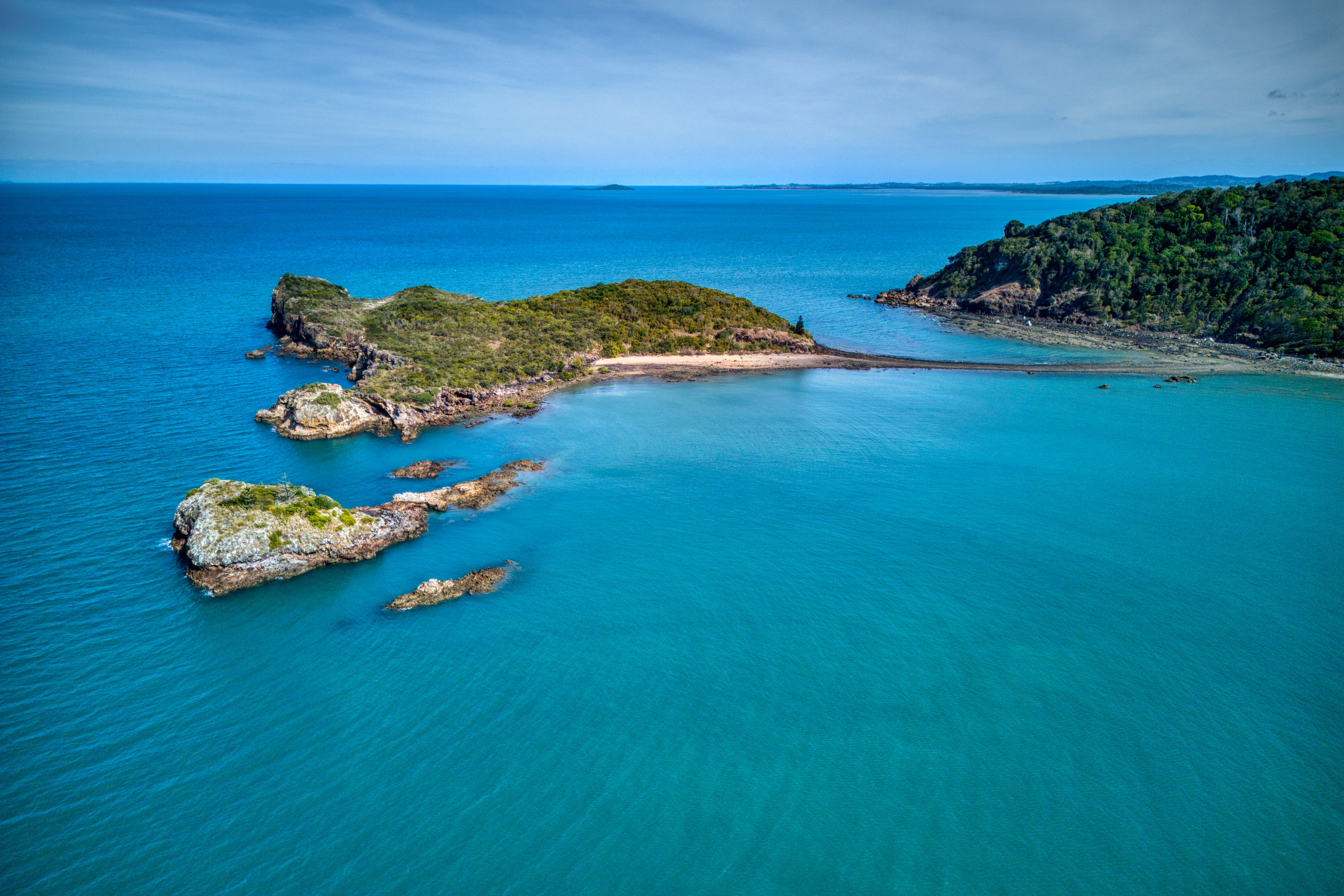
Wedge Island at low tide, 2024

The waters of the Coral Sea surround the locality to the north, east, and south.

Cape Hillsborough has the following coastal and close offshore features (clockwise):

- Ball Bay (20.9051°S 149.0094°E)
- Smalleys Beach (20.9130°S 149.0112°E)
- Cape Hillsborough (20.9066°S 149.0489°E)
- Andrews Point (20.9281°S 149.0590°E)
- Wedge Island (20.9229°S 149.0604°E)
- Sand Bay (20.9501°S 149.0536°E)

Further offshore are:

- Allonby Island (20.7520°S 149.1614°E)
- Finger and Thumb Islands (20.7556°S 149.2195°E)
- Coffin Island (20.7338°S 149.2330°E)
- Maryport Island (20.7593°S 149.2715°E)

The north of the locality is within the Cape Hillsborough National Park. Apart from this protected area, the land use is mixture of grazing on native vegetation and rural residential housing.

== Demographics ==
In the 2016 census, Cape Hillsborough had a population of 44 people.

In the 2021 census, Cape Hillsborough had a population of 39 people.

== Education ==
There are no schools in Cape Hillsborough. The nearest government primary school is Seaforth State School in Seaforth to the west. The nearest government secondary school is Mackay North State High School in North Mackay to the south-east.

== Attractions ==
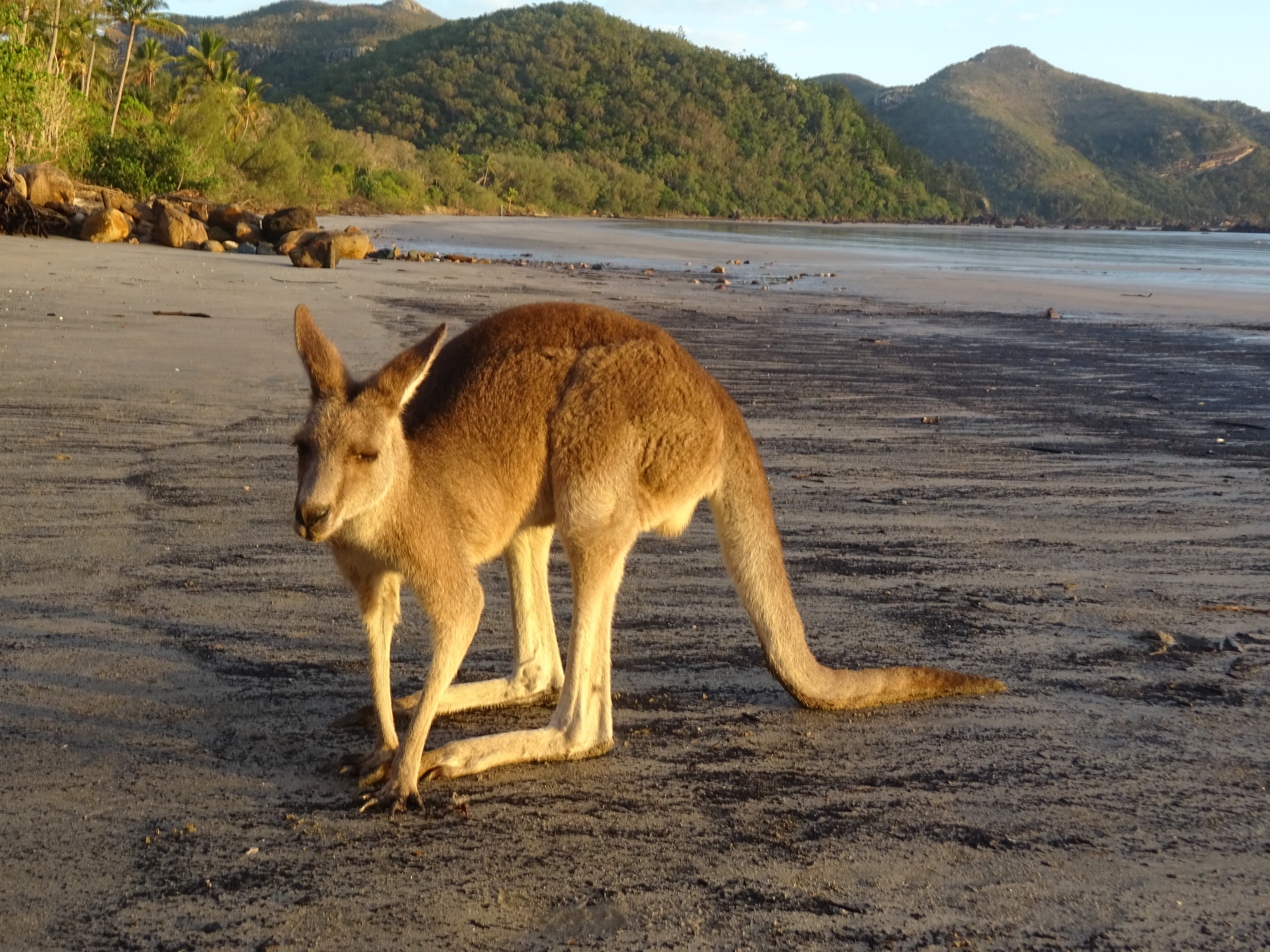
Kangaroo on the beach at Cape Hillsborough, 2017

Within the national park, the Cape Hillsborough Resort on Risley Parade provides accommodation (20.9250°S 149.0480°E). The Andrews Point walking track commences there, providing access to the following lookouts:

- Twin Beaches Lookout (20.9265°S 149.0524°E)
- Turtle Lookout (20.9285°S 149.0573°E)
- Andrews Point Lookout (20.9280°S 149.0589°E)
- Wedge Island Lookout (20.9263°S 149.0572°E)

Seeing kangaroos on the beach is a popular tourist attraction.
