= Ball Bay, Queensland =

Ball Bay
- Town
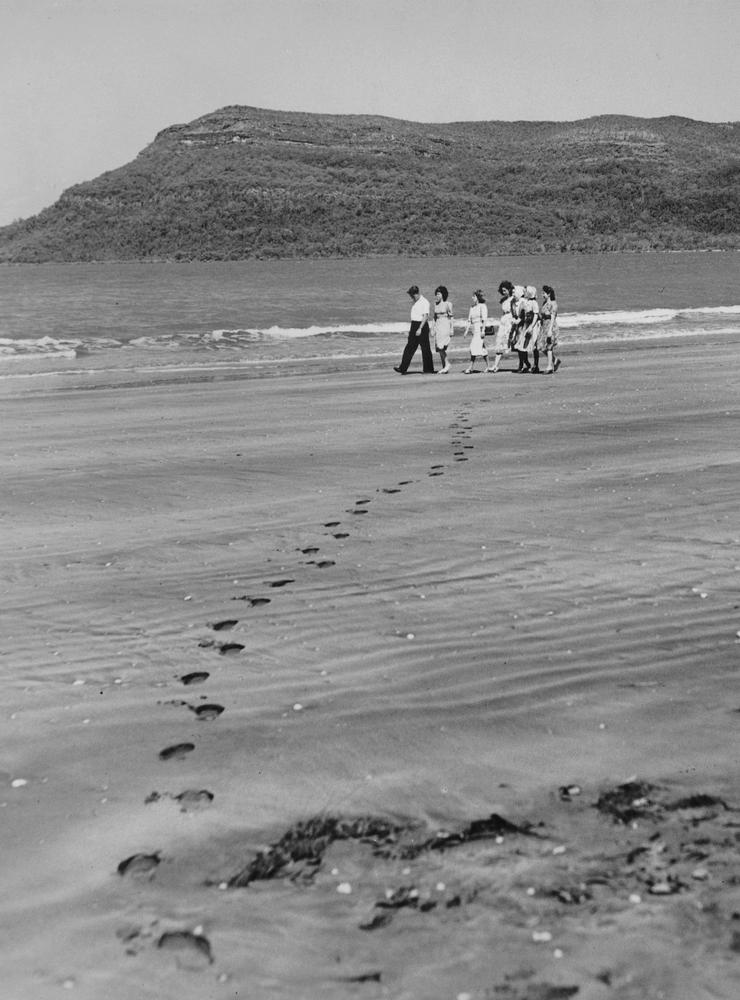
- Footprints in the sand at Ball Bay, 1948

- Interactive map of Ball Bay
- Coordinates: 20.9058°S 148.9969°E
- Country: Australia
- State: Queensland
- LGA: Mackay Region
- Location: 46.7 km (29.0 mi) NW of North Mackay; 48.2 km (30.0 mi) NW of Mackay CBD; 380 km (240 mi) NNW of Rockhampton; 1,020 km (630 mi) NNW of Brisbane

Government
  - State electorate: Whitsunday
  - Federal division: Dawson

Population
  - Total: 384 (2021 census)
- Time zone: UTC+10:00 (AEST)
- Postcode: 4741
Localities around Ball Bay
Haliday Bay	Coral Sea	Coral Sea
Seaforth	Ball Bay	Cape Hillsborough
Mount Jukes	Mount Jukes	Cape Hillsborough

Ball Bay is a coastal rural town, a locality and a bay in Mackay Region, Queensland, Australia. In the 2021 census, the locality of Ball Bay had a population of 384 people.

== Geography ==
Ball Bay is located 43 kilometres (27 mi) north-west of Mackay and 71 kilometres (44 mi) south-east of Proserpine. It is the nearest settlement to Cape Hillsborough National Park.

== Demographics ==
In the 2011 census, the locality of Ball Bay had a population of 628 people.

In the 2016 census, the locality of Ball Bay had a population of 360 people.

In the 2021 census, the locality of Ball Bay had a population of 384 people.

== Education ==
There are no schools in Ball Bay. The nearest government primary school is Seaforth State School in neighbouring Seaforth to the west. The nearest government secondary school is Mackay North State High School in North Mackay to the south-east.

== Amenities ==
The Mackay Regional Council operate a camping ground at Ball Bay. Beach fishing is a popular local activity.

The Mackay Regional Council operates a mobile library service on a fortnightly schedule at Coconut Grove.
