= Haliday Bay, Queensland =

Haliday Bay
- Suburb
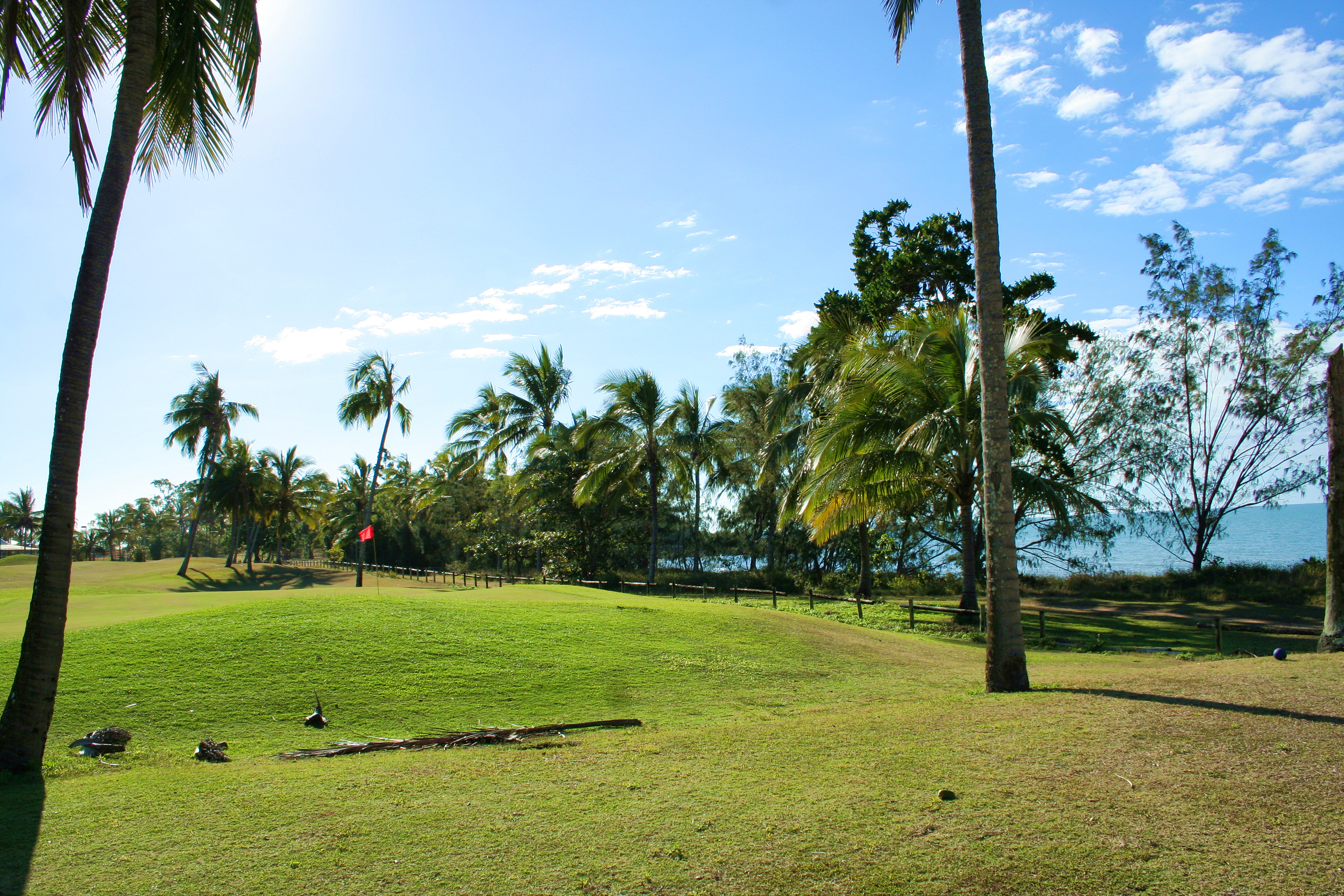
- Haliday Bay Golf Course, 2011

- Interactive map of Haliday Bay
- Coordinates: 20.9033°S 148.9863°E
- Country: Australia
- State: Queensland
- LGA: Mackay Region
- Location: 9.2 km (5.7 mi) NE of Seaforth; 48.9 km (30.4 mi) NW of Mackay; 363 km (226 mi) SE of Townsville; 1,021 km (634 mi) NNW of Brisbane

Government
  - State electorate: Whitsunday
  - Federal division: Dawson

Area
  - Total: 2.5 km^{2} (0.97 sq mi)
- Elevation: 0–100 m (0–328 ft)

Population
  - Total: 172 (2021 census)
  - Density: 68.8/km^{2} (178/sq mi)
- Postcode: 4740
Suburbs around Haliday Bay
Seaforth	Coral Sea	Ball Bay
Seaforth	Haliday Bay	Ball Bay
Seaforth	Ball Bay	Ball Bay

Haliday Bay is a rural locality in the Mackay Region, Queensland, Australia. In the 2021 census, Haliday Bay had a population of 172 people.

== Geography ==
The locality is bounded to the north-west and north by the Coral Sea and to the north-east by the bay Haliday Bay (20.8929°S 148.9914°E). Ball Bay Road forms most of the locality's eastern boundary, while Cape Hillsborough Road forms its southern boundary.

The centre and east of the locality is within the Cape Hillsborough National Park which extends into the neighbouring locality of Ball Bay.

The land is mostly low-lying with elevations of 0 to 10 metres (0 to 33 ft) above sea level but there is one unnamed hill which rises to 100 metres (330 ft) in the north-east of the locality near the boundary with Ball Bay.

The land use in the south of the locality is predominantly growing sugarcane, while the north of the locality near the sea is divided between suburban housing with the Haliday Bay Golf Course fronting onto the sandy beach of the bay Haliday Bay.

== History ==
The bay was named after "Captain" George Haliday, an Irish-born ship's engineer who served in the Royal Navy. He selected Portion 1371 in the Parish of Ossa in 1883. He collected built a coral-stone house with a thatched roof on the selection using stones he had collected from the beach and lived there until 1887. The house was called Bellbrook or Bell Brook. Haliday died in Melbourne in 1935. Historically it has also been written as Halliday Bay.

== Demographics ==
In the 2016 census, Haliday Bay had a population of 167 people.

In the 2021 census, Haliday Bay had a population of 172 people.

== Education ==
There are no schools in Haliday Bay. The nearest government primary school is Seaforth State School in neighbouring Seaforth to the west. The nearest government secondary school is Mackay North State High School in North Mackay to the south-east.

== Amenities ==
Haliday Bay Golf Club has a 9-hole course at 2 Headland Drive (20.8947°S 148.9880°E).

== Facilities ==
Haliday Bay Rural Fire Station is operated by a volunteer rural fire brigade at 1 Headland Drive (20.8979°S 148.9875°E).
