= Pindi Pindi Brickworks =

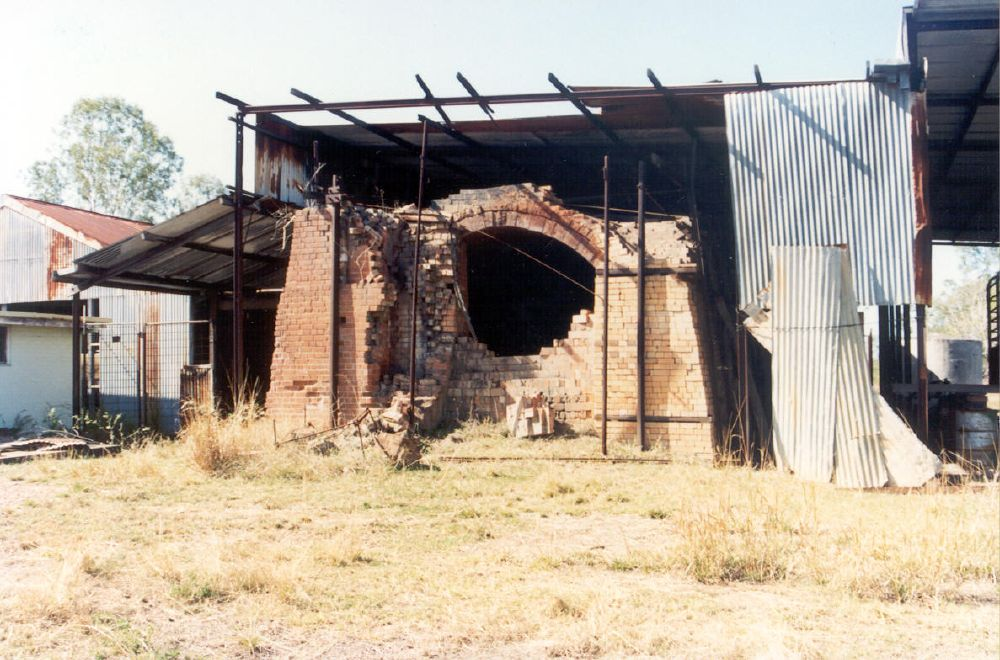
- Pindi Pindi Brickworks

- Location within Queensland Location within Australia
- 20.8703°S 148.7368°E
- Location: Off the Bruce Highway, Pindi Pindi, Mackay Region, Queensland, Australia

History
- Design period: 1919 - 1930s (interwar period)
- Built: 1933

Queensland Heritage Register
- Official name: Pindi Pindi Brickworks (former), Evans Firebricks Ltd, Pindi Pindi Firebricks Company
- Type: state heritage (archaeological, built)
- Designated: 27 October 2000
- Reference no.: 601655
- Significant period: c. 1933 (fabric); 1933- c. 1939, 1949-1958, 1961-1977 (historical)
- Significant components: store/s / storeroom / storehouse, machinery/plant/equipment - manufacturing/processing, office/administration building, chimney/chimney stack, kiln, quarry, residential accommodation - housing

Pindi Pindi Brickworks is a heritage-listed former brickworks off the Bruce Highway, Pindi Pindi, Mackay Region, Queensland, Australia. It was built in 1933. It is also known as Evans Firebricks Ltd and Pindi Pindi Firebricks Company. It was added to the Queensland Heritage Register on 27 October 2000.

== History ==
The former Pindi Pindi Brickworks were established in 1933 for Edmund Evans.

The production of bricks on the site was related to the presence of coal at the Fleetwood Colliery, in the Whiptail Ranges, a source that was first commercially exploited in 1927–28. This colliery supplied the brickworks with coal following the opening of the Pindi Pindi site. Production of bricks was possible due to the high quality of clay in the area.

The brickworks were established by Edmund Evans, a resident of Dinmore, a bricklayer by trade with experience in brick manufacture. A local resident, W Adams, assisted him in investigating the site. Construction on the brickworks site, established to supply the North Queensland market, began in May 1933. The first production of bricks took place at the end of 1933.

Local shareholders in the Mackay area invested in the establishment of the works, with the brickworks trading under the name of Evans Firebricks Ltd. In 1934, the works employed 18 local workers, three of whom quarried the material at the clay pit and fifteen employed in the works environment. 78 000 bricks were produced during this time. Increasing demand for building bricks, as well as for firebricks, necessary for the sugar industry in North Queensland, saw the continued expansion of the brickworks.

In 1937, the company won a lucrative contract to supply refractory firebricks used in the construction of brick arches in locomotive fireboxes for the Northern Division of Queensland Railways. It was the only local company capable of producing this material.

Following the replacement of Evans in 1938, Newbold Industries purchased the works, and Bill Gunthorpe was appointed as manager. Gunthorpe took up residence on site, living in a brick veneer dwelling, thought to be the first constructed in the area. This dwelling is currently separated from the brickworks site, situated on the Bruce Highway, across from the sheds. At this time, the works were renamed the Pindi Pindi Firebricks Company and continued to supply materials for the construction industry in North Queensland.

With the outbreak of World War II the works were forced to close, as a result of labour shortages and the loss of construction contracts in North Queensland. At the time, the threat to Australia from invasion was considered so real that machinery on site was buried to prevent it falling into the hands of the Japanese. At the end of 1947, the company closed, only to be reopened in 1949 by a local resident, Tony Giaiotti. Edmund Evans returned on site to act as an advisor to Giaiotti.

The bricks at Pindi Pindi were made by the semi-plastic method. A tramline ran from the clay and shale pit to the works. The clay was ground in the pan and then dropped into the brick press. The building bricks and fire bricks used the dry press method, however, bricks for fire arches in locomotive fireboxes had to be fashioned manually.

Early bricks produced on site were stamped with EFB (Evans Fire Bricks). The original brick pan and press were from Fowlers in Sydney. The pug-mill (mud mixer) was designed by Evans. The single cylinder engine remaining on site was imported from England, and is thought to be still capable of operating.

Products from the works also found markets in other parts of Queensland, firebricks being used at the Mount Isa smelters as well as at Ipswich. Labour shortages continued to afflict the works at this time, and during the sugar crushing season, the works closed entirely.

During the 1950s, the brickworks changed hands three times, being sold in 1951 to George Fattseas of Mackay. In 1955, Bitkin and Machen purchased the site, but closed the works in 1958. A local Mackay builder, Alan Porter, purchased the works in 1961, reopening them and continued in ownership until 1977. The Pindi Pindi works closed in 1977 with the brickworks being relocated to a new site at Glenalla Road, Mackay. At the time of closure, most of the machinery was moved to the new works; however, the kilns, brick pan and press and single cylinder engine (Ruston Hornsby) remain on site.

Bricks from the former Pindi Pindi Brickworks were used to construct the Mackay Central State School (formerly the Mackay Intermediate School), Mackay Court House and Mackay Technical College. The brickworks are no longer in operation.

== Description ==
The former Pindi Pindi Brickworks site is bounded by Blackrock Creek to the south and the Bruce Highway and railway line to the west. At present, the former Pindi Pindi Bricworks site includes the remnants of the kilns, the brick chimney stacks and the brick-floored "storage area".

Evidence of the clay and shale pit quarrying operation is still present, and now shares the boundary with another property on the eastern side of the allotment. The original processing area is still visible, with the floor being constructed of bricks produced at the works. Original wooden supports, roof beams and trusses also remain, along with corrugated iron roofing. The majority of the walls are open, and the roofed area has dirt floors.

Two brick kilns, with chimneys, remain. Located at the base of the kilns are a number of openings with arched brick lintels. The original clay conveyor belt and pan are also present under the covered works area. Two small, brick offices remain in the western corner of the site, as does a single storey brick house. The house is located near the river at the southern end of the property.

== Heritage listing ==
The former Pindi Pindi Brickworks was listed on the Queensland Heritage Register on 27 October 2000 having satisfied the following criteria.

The place is important in demonstrating the evolution or pattern of Queensland's history.

The former Pindi Pindi Brickworks, established in 1933, is important as an industrial in North Queensland, demonstrating industrial processes of the inter-war period. The establishment of the Brickworks resulted from the demand for the supply of building materials in North Queensland, as well as being the source of production for the supply of firebricks for the local sugar milling industry. It was the first brickworks to be established outside Brisbane capable of producing refractory firebricks, supplying these by contract to Queensland Railways.

The place demonstrates rare, uncommon or endangered aspects of Queensland's cultural heritage.

The site demonstrates a rare aspect of Queensland's history as the brickworks chimney stacks at the Pindi Pindi site are among the last remaining stacks in the district.

The place has potential to yield information that will contribute to an understanding of Queensland's history.

As an industrial archaeological site, the former Pindi Pindi Brickworks has the potential to reveal information which could contribute to an understanding of Queensland's heritage, providing more information on the manufacture of bricks in North Queensland.

The place is important because of its aesthetic significance.

The former Pindi Pindi Brickworks is significant for the landmark qualities of the chimney stacks.

The place has a strong or special association with a particular community or cultural group for social, cultural or spiritual reasons.

The bricks produced at the former Pindi Pindi Brickworks are associated with the development of the character and fabric of North Queensland, particularly in the Mackay area.
