= The Leap, Queensland =

The Leap
- Suburb
- Interactive map of The Leap
- Coordinates: 21.0638°S 149.0227°E
- Country: Australia
- State: Queensland
- LGA: Mackay Region
- Location: 22.7 km (14.1 mi) NW of Mackay CBD; 994 km (618 mi) NNW of Brisbane

Government
  - State electorate: Whitsunday
  - Federal division: Dawson

Area
  - Total: 55.4 km^{2} (21.4 sq mi)

Population
  - Total: 664 (2021 census)
  - Density: 11.986/km^{2} (31.04/sq mi)
- Time zone: UTC+10:00 (AEST)
- Postcode: 4740
Suburbs around The Leap
Mount Jukes	Coral Sea	Habana
Kuttabul	The Leap	Habana
Hampden	Balnagowan	Farleigh

The Leap is a coastal rural locality in the Mackay Region, Queensland, Australia. In the 2021 census, The Leap had a population of 664 people.

== Geography ==
The locality is bounded to the north-west by Constant Creek and to the north by its mouth (21.0000°S 149.0167°E) into the Coral Sea. Sand Bay is offshore (20.95000°S 149.0536°E).

The locality has a number of named peaks, including:

- Sugarloaf Peak (21.1034°S 149.0310°E) 254 metres (833 ft)
- The Leap (Mount Mandurana) (21.0682°S 149.0251°E) 306 metres (1,004 ft)
- The Sister (21.0617°S 149.0420°E) 182 metres (597 ft)

There is a section of the Pioneer Peaks National Park in the centre of the locality. To the immediate west and south of the national park are areas of rural residential housing. The land use in the rest of the locality is a mixture of grazing and crop growing (predominantly sugarcane).

The Bruce Highway enters the locality from the south-east (Farleigh) and exits to the south-west (Hampden). The North Coast railway line follows a similar route to the north of the highway but there are no railway stations on that line serving the locality. There is a network of cane tramways in the locality to transport the harvested sugarcane to the sugar mill for processing.

== History ==
The locality is named after the nearby mountain of the same name. It is named for a historical event in which it is widely believed an Aboriginal woman carrying her daughter leapt off a cliff to evade capture by the Queensland Native Police circa 1860. The woman died but her daughter survived.

The Leap Provisional School opened on 13 March 1893. On 1 January 1909, it became The Leap State School. In 1919, Arthur Edward Hunter (of The Leap Hotel) donated 1.1786 hectares (2.912 acres) of land for the school. The school closed on 8 August 1969. As the land had been donated for school purposes, the usual practice was that the land was returned to the donor or their heirs. Two people made claims to be Hunter's relatives, but the Queensland Government did not find the claims to be proven and decided in 1988 to sell the land and kept the proceeds. The school was at 2105 Maraju Yakapari Road (21.0700°S 149.00847°E).

The North Coast railway line reached The Leap in 1924, with the area being served by the following now-abandoned stations (from south to north):

- Wundaru railway station (21.0869°S 149.0597°E)
- Mapalo railway station (21.0823°S 149.0426°E)
- The Leap railway station (21.0774°S 149.0247°E)
- Yakapari railway station (21.0690°S 149.0029°E)

== Demographics ==
In the 2011 census, The Leap had a population of 673 people.

In the 2016 census, The Leap had a population of 642 people.

In the 2021 census, The Leap had a population of 664 people.

== Heritage listings ==
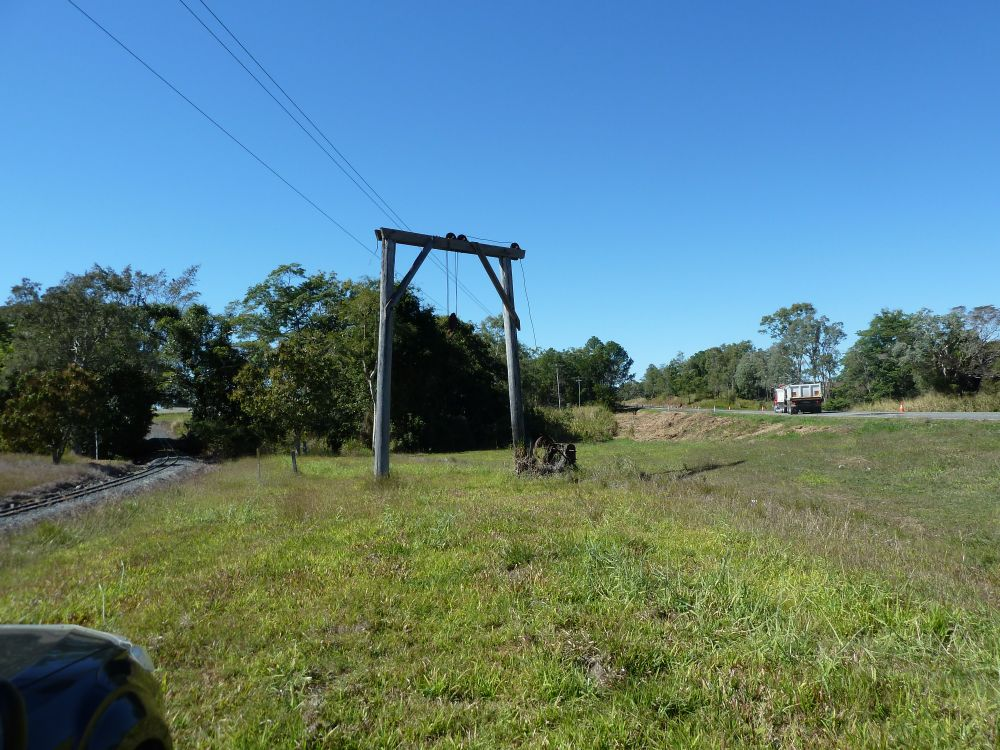
The Leap cane lift, 2011

The Leap has a number of heritage-listed sites, including:

- The Leap Cane Lift, Bruce Highway (21.0854°S 149.0335°E)

== Education ==
There are no schools in The Leap. The nearest government primary schools are Coningsby State School and Farleigh State School, both in neighbouring Fairleigh to the south-east. The nearest government secondary school are Mackay Northern Beaches State High School in Rural View to the east and Mackay North State High School in North Mackay to the south-east.

== Attractions ==
A sculpture representing the Aboriginal woman who jumped from the cliff was erected outside a local hotel in the area.
