= Mentmore, Queensland =

Mentmore
- Suburb
- Interactive map of Mentmore
- Coordinates: 20.7633°S 148.7383°E
- Country: Australia
- State: Queensland
- LGA: Mackay Region
- Location: 39.4 km (24.5 mi) N of Calen; 95.0 km (59.0 mi) NW of Mackay CBD; 1,071 km (665 mi) NNW of Brisbane

Government
  - State electorate: Whitsunday
  - Federal division: Dawson

Area
  - Total: 136.8 km^{2} (52.8 sq mi)

Population
  - Total: 0 (2021 census)
  - Density: 0.000/km^{2} (0.000/sq mi)
- Time zone: UTC+10:00 (AEST)
- Postcode: 4798
Suburbs around Mentmore
Bloomsbury	Midge Point	Coral Sea
Yalboroo	Mentmore	Coral Sea
Yalboroo	Pindi Pindi	Coral Sea

Mentmore is a coastal locality in the Mackay Region, Queensland, Australia. In the 2021 census, Mentmore had "no people or a very low population".

== Geography ==
The Tonga Range runs through the centre of the locality with Tonga Mountain, the highest peak at 233 metres.

Mentmore has the following mountains (from north to south):

- Tonga Mountain (20.7453°S 148.7237°E) 233 metres (764 ft)
- Rocky Mountain (20.7809°S 148.8185°E) 120 metres (390 ft)

Mentore has the following coastal features (from north to south):

- Ten Mile Beach (20.7010°S 148.7304°E)
- Mentmore Beach (20.7766°S 148.8058°E)
- Stewart Peninsula (20.7801°S 148.8127°E)
- Dewars Beach (20.7847°S 148.8340°E)
- Dewars Point, a headland (20.7924°S 148.8386°E)

Offshore are a number of named marine features:

- Gould Island (20.6726°S 148.7590°E)
- Midge Island (20.6906°S 148.7640°E)
- Cave Island (20.7836°S 148.8558°E)
- Brothers Islands, an island group (20.7895°S 148.8524°E).
- High Islands, an island group (20.8005°S 148.8751°E)
- St Helens Bay (20.81417°S 148.87583°E)

The land use is grazing on native vegetation.

== History ==
Menmore was officially named and bounded by the Minister for Natural Resources on 3 September 1999.

Mentmore Beach was a popular holiday destination in the 1930s and 1940s with swimming and fishing the main attractions. However, plans to develop the beach as a seaside resort required subdivision of land which was unable to proceed until a better access road was established and the road was never funded.

== Demographics ==
In the 2016 census, Mentmore had "no people or a very low population".

In the 2021 census, Mentmore had "no people or a very low population".

== Economy ==
There are a number of homesteads in the locality:

- Exmoor (20.7246°S 148.6638°E)
- Mentmore (20.7940°S 148.7808°E

== Education ==
There are no schools in Mentmore. The nearest government primary schools are Pindi Pindi State School in neighbouring Pindi Pindi to the south and Bloomsbury State School in neighbouring Bloomsbury to the north-west. The nearest government secondary school is Calen District State College in Calen to the south.
