= Devereux Creek =

- Suburb
- Interactive map of Devereux Creek
- Coordinates: 21.1008°S 148.8808°E
- Country: Australia
- State: Queensland
- LGA: Mackay Region
- Location: 9.5 km (5.9 mi) NW of Mirani; 35.8 km (22.2 mi) W of Mackay; 1,006 km (625 mi) NNW of Brisbane

Government
  - State electorate: Mirani
  - Federal division: Capricornia

Area
  - Total: 53.0 km^{2} (20.5 sq mi)

Population
  - Total: 406 (2021 census)
  - Density: 7.660/km^{2} (19.84/sq mi)
- Time zone: UTC+10:00 (AEST)
- Postcode: 4753
Suburbs around Devereux Creek
Kuttabul	Kuttabul	Hampden
Mount Martin	Devereux Creek	Hampden
Mirani	Mirani	Marian

Devereux Creek is a rural locality in the Mackay Region, Queensland, Australia. In the 2021 census, Devereux Creek had a population of 406 people.

== Geography ==
Devereux Creek has the following mountains (from west to east):

- Mount Toby (21.1068°S 148.8577°E) 359 metres (1,178 ft)
- Mount McGregor (21.1286°S 148.8859°E) 272 metres (892 ft)
- Mount De Moleyns (21.1097°S 148.9262°E) 411 metres (1,348 ft)

The Pioneer River forms the southern boundary of the locality. Devereux Creek rises on the slopes of Mount Toby and flows through the locality becoming a tributary of the Pioneer River on that southern boundary (21.13790°S 148.90803°E).

The land rises from 35 metres (115 ft) above sea level at the river rising to more mountainous terrain in the north of the locality (Mount De Moleyns being the highest peak). Most of the northern part of the locality is within the Mount Martin National Park or the three sections of Mount Toby State Forest. The southern parts of the locality on the flatter land near the river are used for growing sugarcane, while the centre and south-west of the locality is used for grazing on native vegetation and rural residential housing.

== History ==
The locality takes its name from the creek, which, in turn, was named after James Devereux, who, in the early days of the Hamilton pastoral station, was lost but then found at the creek. Mount Toby is named after one of the station hands, while Mount De Moleyns is named after a man who lost an eye in an accident while hunting for stock on the mountain.

In 1885, 3 acres (1.2 ha) of land was reserved for a school, but it was not until 1903 that approval was given to establish a provisional school. Devereux Creek Provisional School opened on 20 July 1903. On 1 January 1909, it became Devereux Creek State School. In March 1926, the school was described as:

"The Devereaux State School has been in existence 23 years. It is only a small building of the old type and capable of accommodating about 24 children. The school has been built in an awkward and out-of-the-way place, with the creek half encircling it close by and a broken gully or two in front ... The children have very little level ground to play upon. In looking back over the earliest records we find that Miss S. Malcomson (now Mrs. M'Faul) was the first teacher In 1903 ... There are only 12 children enrolled at present. These are well supplied with a library, containing 100 books to which the children have free access. Last year saw the first pupil pass for the High School ... "

The school closed in 1928, but re-opened in 1932 as Devereaux Creek State School (spelling variation). It closed permanently in 1970. It was on the northern side of Devereux Creek Road (approx 21.12235°S 148.90707°E).

== Demographics ==
In the 2016 census, Devereux Creek had a population of 381 people.

In the 2021 census, Devereux Creek had a population of 406 people.

== Education ==
There are no schools in Devereux Creek. The nearest government primary schools are Mirani State School in neighbouring Mirani to the south and Marian State School in neighbouring Marian to the south-east. The nearest government secondary school is Mirani State High School, also in Mirani.
