= Kuttabul, Queensland =

Kuttabul
- Town
- Interactive map of Kuttabul
- Coordinates: 21.0375°S 148.9088°E
- Country: Australia
- State: Queensland
- LGA: Mackay Region
- Location: 15.7 km (9.8 mi) N of Mirani; 38.7 km (24.0 mi) WNW of Mackay; 1,011 km (628 mi) NNW of Brisbane

Government
  - State electorate: Whitsunday
  - Federal division: Dawson

Area
  - Total: 128.0 km^{2} (49.4 sq mi)

Population
  - Total: 707 (2021 census)
  - Density: 5.523/km^{2} (14.306/sq mi)
- Time zone: UTC+10:00 (AEST)
- Postcode: 4741
Localities around Kuttabul
Mount Ossa	Seaforth	Mount Jukes
Mount Ossa	Kuttabul	The Leap
Mount Martin	Devereux Creek	Hampden

Kuttabul is a rural town and locality in the Mackay Region, Queensland, Australia. In the 2021 census, the locality of Kuttabul had a population of 707 people.

== Geography ==
The town is located in the centre of the locality. The Pioneer Peaks National Park is in the east of the locality, the Mount Martin National Park is in the south-west of the locality, and the Mount Toby State Forest is in the south of the locality.

Kuttabul has the following mountains (from north to south):

- Mount Roy (21.0334°S 148.8474°E) 260 metres (850 ft) in the west of the locality
- The Pinnacle (21.0363°S 148.9463°E) 246 metres (807 ft) within the Pioneer Peaks National Park
- Mount Blackwood (21.0411°S 148.9402°E) 590 metres (1,940 ft) within the Pioneer Peaks National Park
- Mount Martin (21.0723°S 148.8262°E) 490 metres (1,610 ft) within the Mount Martin National Park

The Bruce Highway crosses through the locality from the south-east (Hampden) to north-west (Mount Ossa), passing through the town. The North Coast railway line also crosses through the locality from the south-east (Hampden) to north-west (Mount Ossa) running roughly parallel and to the east of the highway passing through the town. The town is served by the Kuttabul railway station (21.0364°S 148.9087°E). The highway and railway pass through a low valley corridor (approx 40 metres above sea level).

Apart from the protected areas, the land use is predominantly growing sugarcane with some grazing on native vegetation and rural residential housing. There is a network of cane tramways to transfer the harvested sugarcane to the sugar mill.

== History ==
Narpi State School opened on 23 August 1926. On 31 December 2005, the school was mothballed, being finally closed on 31 December 2006. It was at 69 Narpi Road (20.9998°S 148.8753°E).

The town takes its name from the Kuttabul railway station, which was assigned by the Queensland Railways Department on 5 March 1927. The name is an Aboriginal word meaning "wonderful". There were a number of former railway stations in the locality (from north to south):

- Buthurra railway station (20.98639°S 148.86222°E)
- Narpi railway station (21.0000°S 148.87333°E)
- Geeberga railway station (21.02472°S 148.89528°E)
- Beallah railway station (21.04944°S 148.92222°E)

== Demographics ==
In the 2016 census, the locality of Kuttabul had a population of 730 people.

In the 2021 census, the locality of Kuttabul had a population of 707 people.

== Education ==
There are no schools in Kuttabul. The nearest government primary schools are Hampden State School in neighbouring Hampden to the south-east, Mirani State School in Mirani to the south, and Seaforth State School in neighbouring Seaforth to the north. The nearest government secondary schools are Mirani State High School in Mirani, Calen District State College in Calen to the north-west, and Mackay North State High School in North Mackay.

== Amenities ==
Kuttabul post office is at 3191 Bruce Highway (21.0405°S 148.9099°E).
