= Yalboroo, Queensland =

Yalboroo
- Town
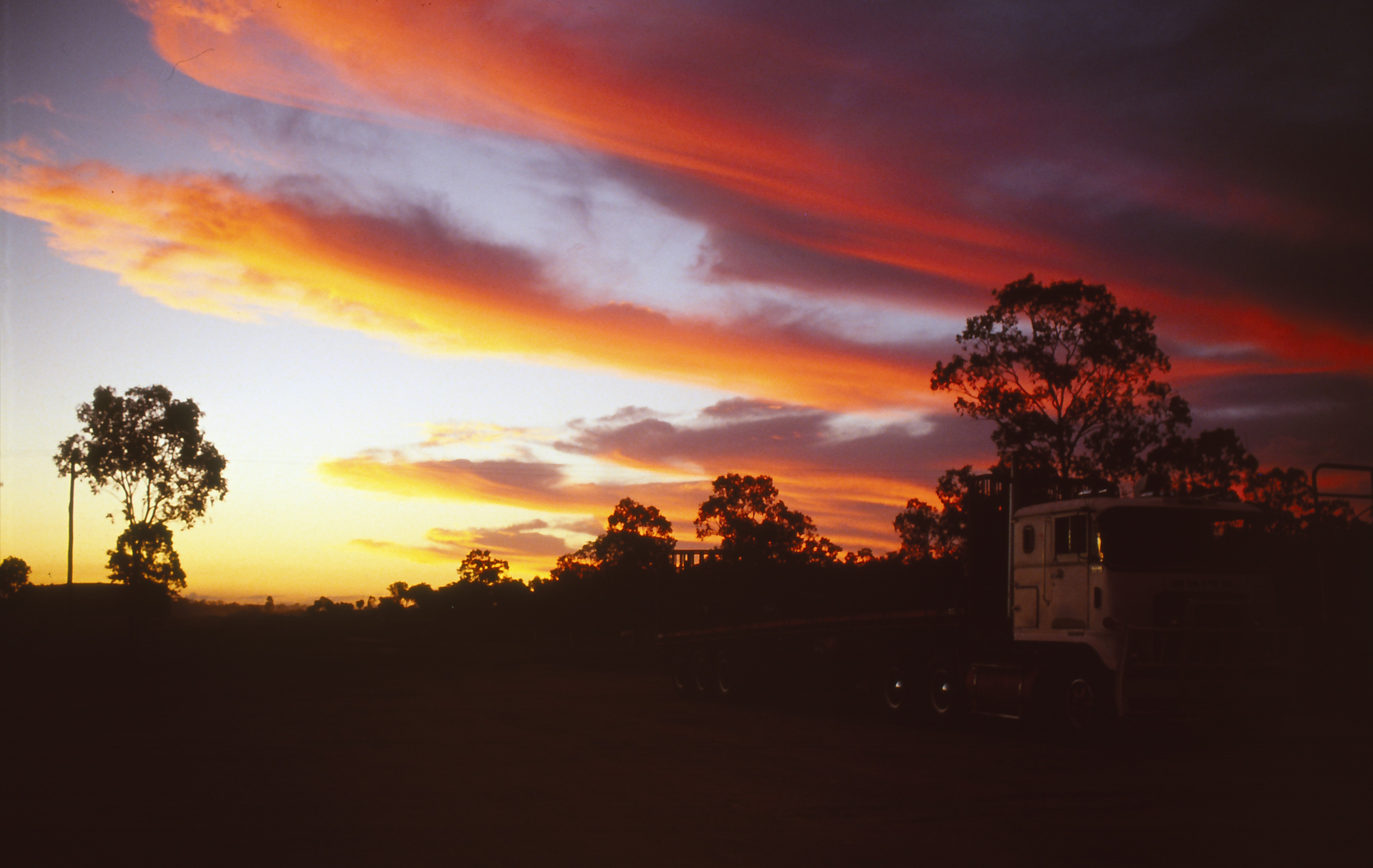
- Sunset, Yalboroo, 1990

- Interactive map of Yalboroo
- Coordinates: 20.8355°S 148.6508°E
- Country: Australia
- State: Queensland
- LGA: Mackay Region
- Location: 15.1 km (9.4 mi) NW of Calen; 55.2 km (34.3 mi) S of Proserpine; 70.7 km (43.9 mi) NW of Mackay; 1,041 km (647 mi) NNW of Brisbane

Government
  - State electorate: Whitsunday
  - Federal division: Dawson

Area
  - Total: 202.9 km^{2} (78.3 sq mi)

Population
  - Total: 146 (2021 census)
  - Density: 0.7196/km^{2} (1.864/sq mi)
- Time zone: UTC+10:00 (AEST)
- Postcode: 4741
Localities around Yalboroo
Bloomsbury	Bloomsbury	Mentmore
Eungella Hinterland	Yalboroo	Pindi Pindi
Eungella Hinterland	Calen	Calen

Yalboroo is a rural town and locality in the Mackay Region, Queensland, Australia. In the 2021 census, the locality of Yalboroo had a population of 146 people.

== Geography ==
Yalboroo is on the Bruce Highway, about 71 kilometres (44 mi) north-west of Mackay. The highway and the North Coast railway line pass through from east to north-west on the same alignment. The town is centred on the former Yalboroo railway station, which is the location of a passing loop.

Cathu is a neighbourhood in the locality, north of the town (20.8166°S 148.6333°E).

A disconnected section of the Eungella National Park is in the south-east of the locality, while the west of the locality is within the Cathu State Forest which extends north into neighbouring Bloomsbury.

Yalboroo has the following mountains (from north to south):

- Rocky Mountain (20.8166°S 148.6424°E) 270 metres (890 ft)
- Mount Seemore (20.8337°S 148.6222°E) 286 metres (938 ft)
- Rhino Mountain (20.8513°S 148.6287°E) 473 metres (1,552 ft)
- Mount Zillah (20.8555°S 148.6548°E) 502 metres (1,647 ft)
- Mount Beatrice (20.8630°S 148.6575°E) 528 metres (1,732 ft)
- Mount Catherine (20.8632°S 148.6776°E) 431 metres (1,414 ft)

== History ==
The town takes its name from the Yalboroo railway station, which was named by the Queensland Railways Department on 7 August 1920. It is an Aboriginal word meaning happy.

Yalboroo Siding Provisional School opened on 29 August 1927 and later that year became Yalboroo State School. It closed on 31 December 2000. The school was at 6885 Bruce Highway (20.8365°S 148.6498°E).

Yalbaroo Post Office opened on 1 December 1927, was renamed Yalboroo in April 1961, and closed on 28 February 1975.

Rise and Shine State School opened on 3 February 1936 and closed circa 1962. It was at 2 Watson and Boyds Road (corner Holds Road, 20.8888°S 148.6628°E).

O'Connell River School opened on 6 August 1937 and closed in 1960. It was to the west of the intersection of Cathu O'Connell Road and Frys Road (20.8632°S 148.6196°E).

== Demographics ==
In the 2016 census, the locality of Yalboroo had a population of 170 people.

In the 2021 census, the locality of Yalboroo had a population of 146 people.

== Education ==
There are no schools in Yalboroo. The nearest government primary schools are Pindi Pindi State School in neighbouring Pindi Pindi to the east and Bloombury State School in neighbouring Bloomsbury to the north. The nearest government secondary school is Calen District State College in neighbouring Calen to the south-east.

== Amenities ==
The Mackay Regional Council operates a mobile library service on a fortnightly schedule at the Community Hall.
