= Pindi Pindi =

- Town
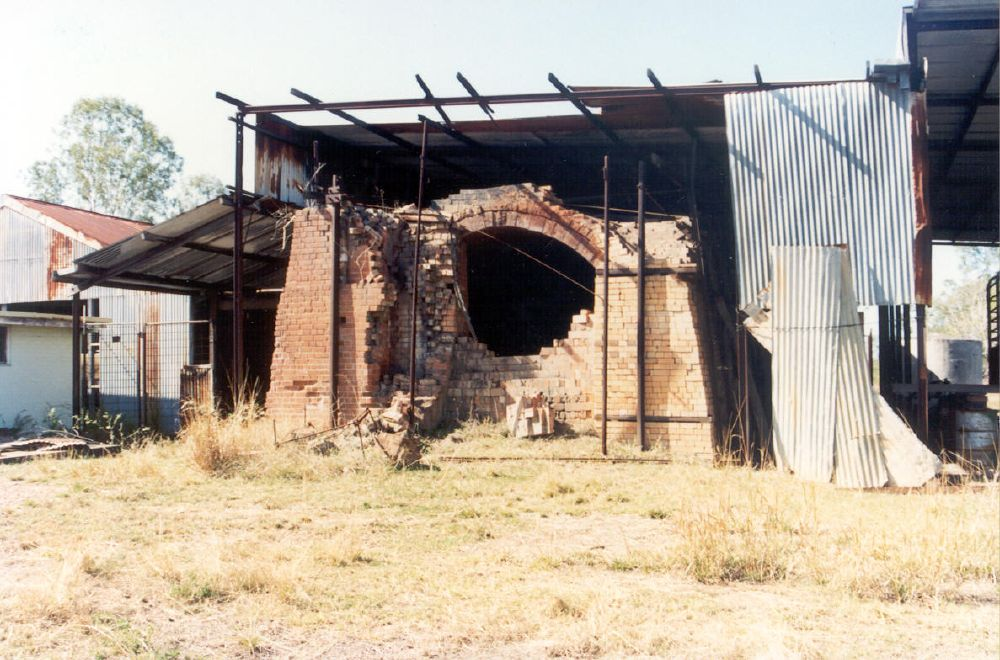
- Pindi Pindi Brickworks

- Interactive map of Pindi Pindi
- Coordinates: 20.855°S 148.7222°E
- Country: Australia
- State: Queensland
- LGA: Mackay Region
- Location: 6.5 km (4.0 mi) N of Calen; 61.3 km (38.1 mi) NW of Mackay; 327 km (203 mi) SE of Townsville; 1,011 km (628 mi) NNW of Brisbane

Government
  - State electorate: Whitsunday
  - Federal division: Dawson

Area
  - Total: 27.5 km^{2} (10.6 sq mi)

Population
  - Total: 86 (2021 census)
  - Density: 3.127/km^{2} (8.10/sq mi)
- Time zone: UTC+10:00 (AEST)
- Postcode: 4798
Localities around Pindi Pindi
Yalboroo	Yalboroo	Mentmore
Yalboroo	Pindi Pindi	St Helens Beach
Calen	Calen	Calen

Pindi Pindi is a rural locality in the Mackay Region, Queensland, Australia. In the 2021 census, the locality of Pindi Pindi had a population of 86 people.

== Geography ==
The locality of Pindi Pindi is bounded to the south and east by Blackrock Creek (which flows into the Coral Sea) and to the north and west by Catherine Creek (a tributary of Blackrock Creek); their confluence is the most easterly point of the locality. Apart from a few small hills which are largely undeveloped, the mostly flat locality is used for farming sugar cane.

The Bruce Highway runs from south-east to north-west through the locality. The North Coast railway line runs parallel and slightly north of the highway.

The locality has a network of privately operated tramway lines for transporting sugar cane to the sugar mill.

The town is located in the south-east of the locality, almost on the boundary to neighbouring Calen, where the school, the former brickworks, and some houses cluster around the former Pindi Pindi railway station (20.8695°S 148.7340°E). The former Wagoora railway station is located in the north-west of the locality (20.8498°S 148.7053°E) with a small cluster of houses around it (a neighbourhood known as Wagoora).

== History ==
The locality takes its name from the Pindi Pindi railway station, which was named by the Queensland Railways Department in 1915. Pindi Pindi is an Aboriginal word, meaning creek or flowing water.

Pindi Pindi Provisional School opened on 24 March 1928, later becoming Pindi Pindi State School.

Pindi Pindi Post Office opened by 1935 and closed in 1981.

Wagoora State School opened on 22 August 1949 and closed in 1963. It was at 5 Foxs Road (20.8460°S 148.7058°E).

== Demographics ==
In the 2011 census, Pindi Pindi had too small a population to be separately reported. However, the combined localities of Pindi Pindi and its neighbours Yalboroo and Mentmore had a population of 376 people.

In the 2016 census, the locality of Pindi Pindi had a population of 98 people.

In the 2021 census, the locality of Pindi Pindi had a population of 86 people.

== Heritage listings ==
Pindi Pindi has a number of heritage-listed sites, including:

- Pindi Pindi Brickworks, off the Bruce Highway (20.8703°S 148.7368°E)

== Education ==
Pindi Pindi State School is a government primary (Prep-6) school for boys and girls at 5923 Bruce Highway (20.8703°S 148.7322°E). In 2015, the school had an enrolment of 27 students with 3 teachers. In 2018, the school had an enrolment of 18 students with 3 teachers (2 full-time equivalent) and 7 non-teaching staff (2 full-time equivalent).

There are no secondary schools in Pindi Pindi. The nearest government secondary school is Calen District State College in neighbouring Calen to the south-east.
