= Hampden, Queensland =

Hampden
- Suburb
- Interactive map of Hampden
- Coordinates: 21.0830°S 148.9516°E
- Country: Australia
- State: Queensland
- LGA: Mackay Region
- Location: 18.3 km (11.4 mi) NE of Mirani; 30.2 km (18.8 mi) WNW of Mackay; 362 km (225 mi) NNW of Rockhampton; 980 km (610 mi) NNW of Brisbane

Government
  - State electorate: Whitsunday
  - Federal division: Dawson

Area
  - Total: 47.7 km^{2} (18.4 sq mi)
- Elevation: 20–232 m (66–761 ft)

Population
  - Total: 598 (2021 census)
  - Density: 12.537/km^{2} (32.47/sq mi)
- Time zone: UTC+10:00 (AEST)
- Postcode: 4741
Suburbs around Hampden
| Kuttabul | Kuttabul | The Leap |
| Devereux Creek | Hampden | The Leap |
| Devereux Creek | Marian | Balnagowan |

Hampden is a rural locality in the Mackay Region, Queensland, Australia. In the 2021 census, Hampden had a population of 598 people.

== Geography ==
The locality is bounded by Constant Creek to the north.

The land is mountainous to the south with the mountain Miltons Lookout (21.1047°S 148.9563°E) at 232 metres (761 ft) above sea level. There is a small section of Mount Martin National Park in the south-west of the locality extending into the neighbouring locality of Devereux Creek. The land then falls towards Constant Creek in the north at an elevation of 20 metres (66 ft) above sea level.

The Bruce Highway enters the locality from the east (The Leap), passes through the lower flatter land in the north of the locality then and exits to the north-west (Kuttabul). The North Coast railway line also enters the locality from the east (The Leap) and exits to the north-west (Kuttabul) with Aminungo railway station (21.0732°S 148.9877°E) serving the locality. There are also two abandoned railway stations on the line:

- Mulei railway station (21.0593°S 148.9415°E )
- Parapi railway station (21.0698°S 148.9644°E)

Mulei is a neighbourhood (21.0666°S 148.9333°E) that developed around the former Mulei railway station. Similarly, Parapi is a neighbourhood (21.0666°S 148.9666°E) the developed around the former Parapi railway station.

There is also a network of cane tramways through the locality to transport the harvested sugarcane to the sugar mills.

The lower flatter land to the north is used for crops, predominantly growing sugarcane. The higher elevations are used for grazing on native vegetation, while the highest areas are unused.

The Marian–Hampden Road commences at the Bruce Highway in the north of the locality and travels south exiting the locality in the south (Marian). In the south of the locality the road passes through is a flat area (232 metres (761 ft) above sea level) which is a rural residential area. The cane tramway also travels this route towards the Marian sugar mill.

== History ==
A postal receiving office opened at Hampden on 21 August 1884, became a post office in August 1904 and closed on 14 October 1924.

Hampden Provisional School opened on 9 May 1887. On 1 January 1909 it became Hampden State School.

The name Parapi as chosen by the Queensland Railways Department on 18 September 1923. It is an Aboriginal word meaning creek. It was originally called Mount Jukes from 12 January 1917.

The name Mulei was chosen by the Queensland Railways Department on 1 February 1926. It is an Aboriginal word meaning hill.

== Demographics ==
In the 2016 census, Hampden had a population of 566 people.

In the 2021 census, Hampden had a population of 598 people.

== Education ==
Hampden State School is a government primary (Prep-6) school for boys and girls at 2880 Bruce Highway (21.0601°S 148.9311°E). In 2018, the school had an enrolment of 76 students with 6 teachers (4 full-time equivalent) and 11 non-teaching staff (4 full-time equivalent).

There are no secondary schools in Hampden. The nearest government secondary schools are Mirani State High School in Mirani to the south-west and Mackay State High School in South Mackay to the south-east.

== Amenities ==
The Mackay Regional Council operates a mobile library service on a fortnightly schedule at the Bruce Highway near the school.
