= Seaforth, Queensland =

Seaforth
- Town
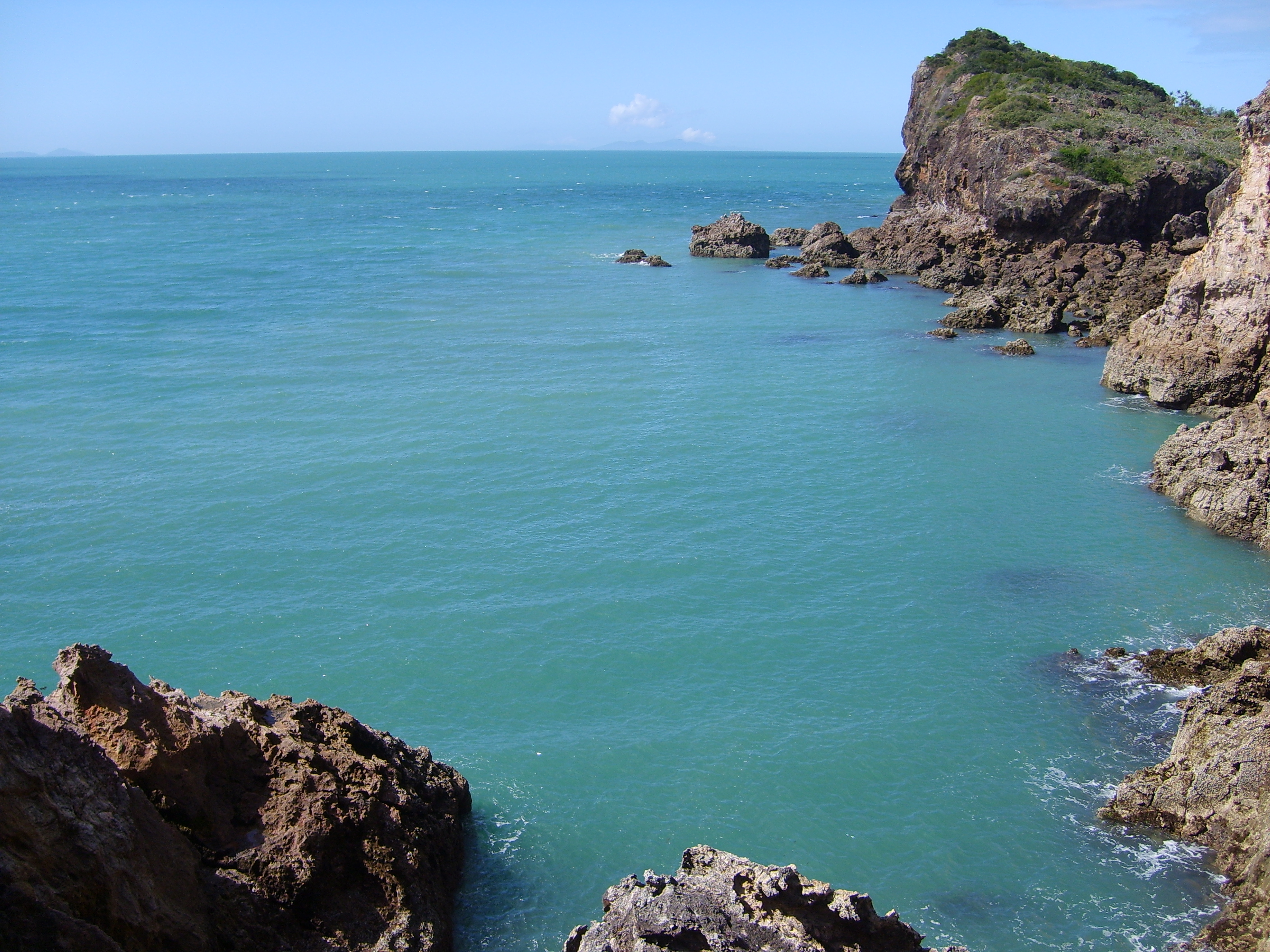
- View in Seaforth

- Interactive map of Seaforth
- Coordinates: 20.9013°S 148.9675°E
- Country: Australia
- State: Queensland
- LGA: Mackay Region
- Location: 27.1 km (16.8 mi) E of Calen; 41.7 km (25.9 mi) NW of Mackay; 991 km (616 mi) NNW of Brisbane
- Established: 1899

Government
  - State electorate: Mackay
  - Federal division: Dawson

Area
  - Total: 68.4 km^{2} (26.4 sq mi)
- Elevation: 0–250 m (0–820 ft)

Population
  - Total: 800 (2021 census)
  - Density: 11.7/km^{2} (30.3/sq mi)
- Time zone: UTC+10:00 (AEST)
- Postcode: 4741
- Mean max temp: 30 °C (86 °F)
- Mean min temp: 11 °C (52 °F)
Localities around Seaforth
| Mount Ossa | Coral Sea | Coral Sea |
| Mount Ossa | Seaforth | Haliday Bay |
| Kuttabul | Mount Jukes | Ball Bay |

Seaforth is a coastal town and locality in the Mackay Region, Queensland, Australia. In the 2021 census, the locality of Seaforth had a population of 800 people.

== Geography ==
Seaforth is a small holiday and fishing town located 35 kilometres (22 mi) north-northwest of Mackay.

Finlaysons Point is a headland at the northernmost of the locality (20.8766°S 148.9509°E). The coastline near the point and extending along the north-east coastline is a sandy beach. The town is beside the beach with most of the residential development in the town or along that stretch of coast.

The southern part of the locality is mountainous, rising to elevations of 250 metres (820 ft) above sea level. The northern part is lower and flatter with typical elevations of 10 to 20 metres (33 to 66 ft) above sea level and used for cropping (mostly sugarcane). Apart from this, the predominant land use is grazing on native vegetation.

Seaforth has the following mountains:

- Mount Springcliffe (20.9089°S 148.9504°E) 116 metres (381 ft)
- Mount Sweetland (20.9665°S 148.8938°E) 171 metres (561 ft)

and the following mountain passes:

- Macartneys Gap (20.9503°S 148.9281°E)
- Niddoes Gap (20.9695°S 148.9042°E)

Islands off-shore from Seaforth include:

- Redcliff Islands (20.8690°S 148.9599°E)
- Acacia Island (also known as Chings Island) (20.8616°S 148.9285°E).

== History ==
In 1899 the Queensland Government bought Seaforth Estate from H.M. Finlayson, a pioneer selector, as a settlement and named it Springcliff; however local residents always called it Seaforth and it was officially renamed Seaforth in 1966. Finlayson Point is named after Finlayson.

Seaforth Provisional School opened on 22 August 1887 and closed in late 1891. A second Seaforth Provisional School opened on 23 April 1935. On 25 October 1948 it became Seaforth State School. The old provisional school building was relocated to become the Seaforth Presbyterian Church, which opened in May 1949 and which served the congregation until May 1961 when the present church was opened. It later became known as the Seaforth Uniting Church after Methodist Church entered into the amalgamation to create the Uniting Church in Australia.

There is a former church building at 53 Palm Avenue (20.8993°S 148.9633°E).

== Demographics ==
In the 2006 census, the town of Seaforth had a population of 613 people.

In the 2016 census, the locality of Seaforth had a population of 789 people.

In the 2021 census, the locality of Seaforth had a population of 800 people.

== Education ==
Seaforth State School is a government primary (Prep-6) school for boys and girls at 2092 Seaforth Road (20.9210°S 148.9626°E). In 2018, the school had an enrolment of 80 students with 8 teachers (6 full-time equivalent) and 9 non-teaching staff (4 full-time equivalent). It includes a special education program.

There is no secondary school in Seaforth. The nearest government secondary schools are Calen District State College in Calen to the west and Mackay North State High School in North Mackay to the south-east.

== Amenities ==
The Mackay Regional Council operates a mobile library service on a fortnightly schedule near the school and at Seaforth Reserve Road.

The Seaforth branch of the Queensland Country Women's Association meets at 1-3 Margaret Street (20.9000°S 148.9637°E).

Seaforth Uniting Church is at 43 Palm Avenue (20.8996°S 148.9638°E).

Star of the Sea Catholic Church is at 2241 Yakapari-Seaforth Road (20.9080°S 148.9607°E). It is part of the Farleigh parish.

Seaforth Bowls Club is in Walsh Street (20.8976°S 148.9609°E).
