= Cape Hillsborough National Park =

National park in Australia

- IUCN category II (national park)
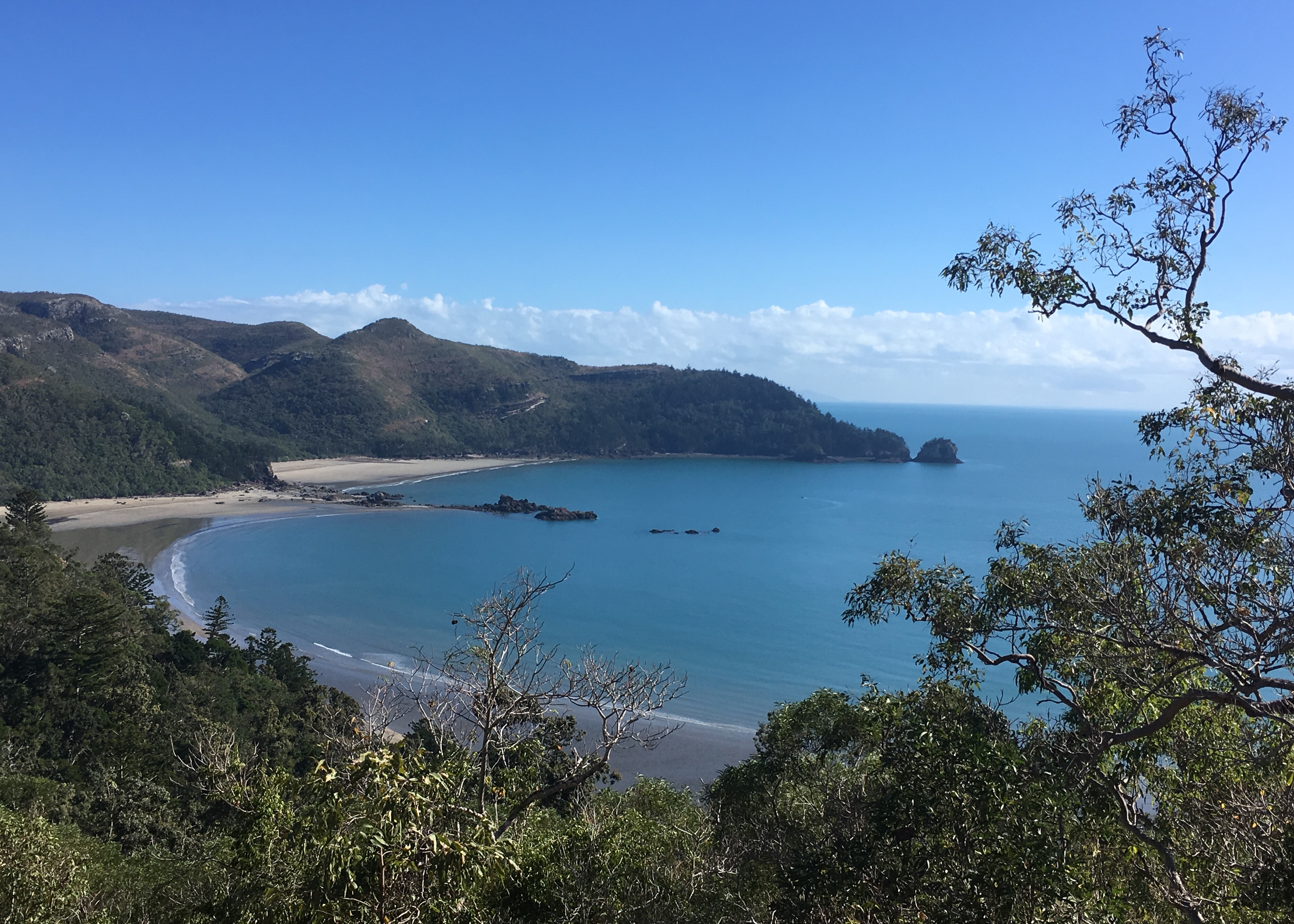
- View across the beach front and bay at Cape Hillsborough National Park

- Location within Queensland
- Location: Queensland
- Nearest city: Mackay
- Coordinates: 20°53′56″S 148°59′37″E
- Area: 10.22 km^{2} (3.95 sq mi)
- Established: 1985
- Governing body: Queensland Parks and Wildlife Service
- Website: http://www.nprsr.qld.gov.au/parks/cape-hillsborough/index.html

Cape Hillsborough is a national park in Mackay Region, Queensland, Australia.

== Geography ==
The park is 837 km northwest of Brisbane. The park is a peninsula of volcanic origin, covered largely by rainforest; the maximum elevation is 267 m. The cape at the tip of the peninsula was named by Lieutenant James Cook during his first voyage to the Pacific in 1770; the name is in honour of Wills Hill, Earl of Hillsborough who was President of the Board of Trade and Plantations from 1763 to 1765 and from 1768 to 1772. The nearest major town is Mackay, about 40 km to the southeast.

The park is located within the O'Connell River water catchment area and the Central Mackay Coast bioregion.

On National Parks Day 2010 (Sunday, 28 March 2010) the Queensland State Government announced the addition of 204 hectares to the park.

Annual precipitation is 1106 mm.

== Animals ==
Many species have been identified in the national park: including approximately 140 birds, 22 mammals, 25 reptiles and 8 amphibians.

Sand bubbler crabs leave their drawings on the sand during low tide, and many creatures hide in the tidal rocky pools.

== See also ==
- Protected areas of Queensland
