= East Gordon Street Sewerage Works =

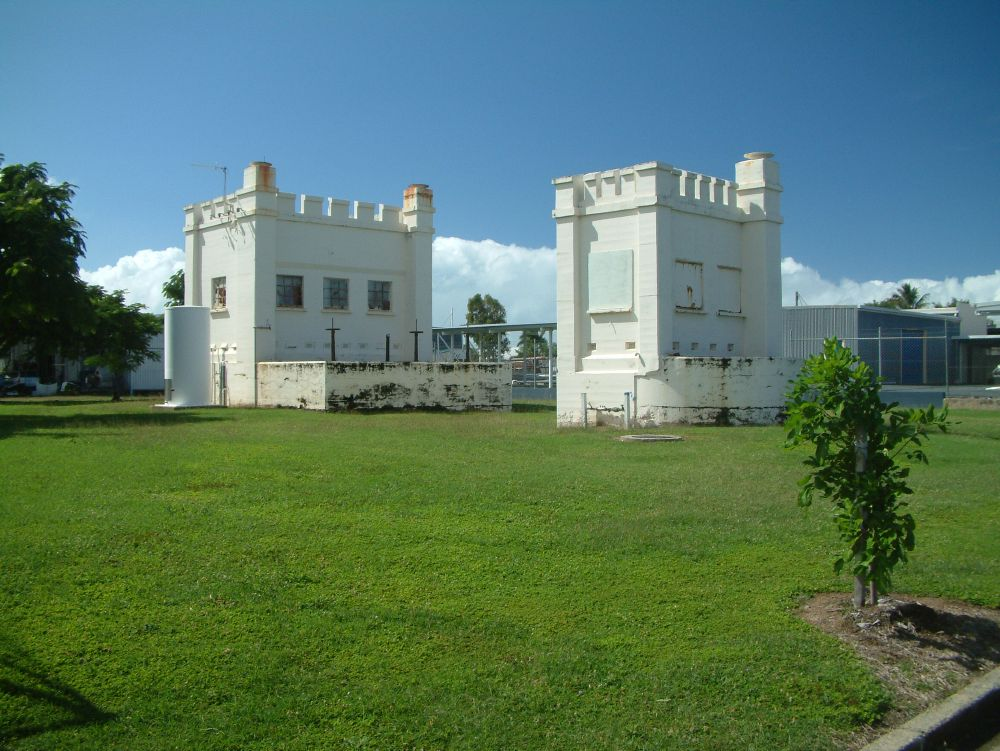
- East Gordon Street Sewerage Works, 2006

- Location within Queensland Location within Australia
- 21.1444°S 149.1929°E
- Location: Sewerage Works Buildings, 38 East Gordon Street, Mackay, Mackay Region, Queensland, Australia

History
- Design period: 1919–1930s (interwar period)
- Built: 1936

Site notes
- Architect: A E Harding Frew

Queensland Heritage Register
- Official name: East Gordon Street Sewerage Works, Pump Stations
- Type: state heritage (built)
- Designated: 10 July 2009
- Reference no.: 602727
- Significant period: 1936–

East Gordon Street Sewerage Works is a heritage-listed pumping station at Sewerage Works Buildings, 38 East Gordon Street, Mackay, Mackay Region, Queensland, Australia. It was designed by A E Harding Frew and built in 1936. It is also known as Pump Stations. It was added to the Queensland Heritage Register on 10 July 2009.

== History ==
The sewerage works in East Gordon Street, one of the first in Queensland, was opened by George Moody, Mayor of Mackay, on 25 January 1936. The consulting engineer was AE Harding Frew.

Mackay began as a settlement on the south bank of the Pioneer River serving pastoral holdings. By 1863 it had been surveyed and the first lots of land sold. It was gazetted as a port of entry and a customs house was opened. Sugar cane was introduced in 1865 and by the mid-1880s this was the major industry in the area. Mackay prospered as a port and as a commercial and administrative centre.

From the end of the nineteenth century until well after World War II, basic services in regional Queensland were progressively upgraded. Reticulated water supplies, sewerage systems and electricity were introduced into regional towns beginning with the major centres. Planning for Brisbane's sewerage system was underway by 1909. A sewerage scheme was introduced at Toowoomba in 1925, and development of a sewerage scheme at Rockhampton commenced in 1936. Most other regional centres did not have sewerage systems provided until after World War Two, with some local government areas waiting until the 1960s–1980s. Mackay's sewerage system, opened in January 1936, was among the first in regional Queensland.

The system was introduced at a time when Mackay was undergoing a major public works program to improve the infrastructure of the town and upgrade the harbour. A number of factors prompted this program. Through the 1920s and 1930s, Mackay enjoyed a period of substantial growth, even during the period of financial hardship and unemployment caused by the Depression. It was the fastest-growing town in Queensland, with its population almost doubling between 1923 and 1940. This was largely due to the linking of Mackay by the North Coast railway line to Rockhampton in 1921 and to Townsville in 1923. This improved access to markets and reduced transport costs, boosting not only the sugar industry, but also the developing dairy and tourist industries.

Another contributing factor was that the local Member of the Queensland Legislative Assembly, William Forgan Smith, was Premier of Queensland between 1932 and 1940 and he supported the growth of the region. It was hoped that the public works program, including the Outer Harbour scheme, would make Mackay one of Queensland's most frequented beauty spots and that, as an attractive modern city, it would become a base for those visiting Eungella and the islands.

The city council commissioned a town plan from Ronald McInnes in 1934. It was based on Britain's Town Planning Act of 1932 and was the first town plan designed for an existing city in Queensland, serving as a model for other cities for many years. The Mackay City Council undertook an ambitious plan for the beautification and modernisation of the city. The scheme included the provision of new parks, kerbing and channelling, new water mains, a new powerhouse and the establishment of the sewerage system.

At the opening of the East Gordon Street Sewerage Works on 25 January 1936 the chairman of the Mackay Harbour Board, Charles Frederick Bagley, paid tribute to the city council for its initiative in carrying out the scheme and to the consulting engineer AE Harding Frew who designed it.

Alison Eavis Harding Frew (1883–1952) was a prominent Queensland civil engineer. Harding Frew's designed about 80 bridges throughout Queensland during his career. He was a consulting engineer in Melbourne during the 1920s and on the Pyrmont Power House at Sydney in the early 1940s. He was a consultant on the 1926 Brisbane Cross River Commission and was the designing engineer for the William Jolly Bridge in Brisbane, from November 1926 to 1932. From 1932 to 1935 he was the engineer for bridge construction on the Hornibrook Highway project, the bridge linking Sandgate and Redcliffe. Frew's design for the fully automated pump houses at Mackay, featuring castellated parapets, encompasses one of the basic principles of civil engineering, which is to design creative solutions that are both functional and aesthetically pleasing.

At the opening of the works Bagley reiterated the view of the day that, with the completion of the sewerage works and the Outer Harbour Scheme, Mackay would become even more important, and the Government Medical Officer, Dr Ernest Wesley Chenoweth, emphasised the public health advantages of the new sewerage scheme.

Sewage was pumped to the site via concrete or glazed pipes, where it was held in a well and treated with chlorine before being pumped out to sea at high tide. The main elements of sewage treatment included the separation of solids from fluids by screening and allowing the solids to settle in a tank. The solids were drawn off and disposed of, and the fluids were often treated before being discharged into a waterway or the ocean. Chlorine was used as a disinfectant.

By December 1933 a total of 68,123 feet (20,764 m) of sewer main, including a main crossing at Sandfly Creek near the East Gordon Street site, had been pegged out. Tenders had also been let for the construction of the pump well and pump house, the supply and installation of pump machinery, and the construction of the chlorinator.

The smaller building (the chlorinator) toward the front of the site is now used for storage. The larger building is still in use as a pump station with a submersible pump external to the structure and a switchboard inside the building. A modern deodoriser has been installed next to this building. Sewage is pumped from the station at East Gordon Street to a pump station in Sydney Street.

The East Gordon Street works forms part of a major network of 135 pump stations throughout Mackay and they are associated with a sewer main of more than 630 kilometres (390 mi), which ultimately connects to one of three waste water treatment plants in the city. Mackay Water, a business unit of Mackay City Council (now of the Mackay Regional Council), is responsible for the management of Mackay's sewerage scheme.

== Description ==
The 1936 Sewerage Works is located on a level allotment in East Gordon Street, Mackay. The two principal early structures on the site are the pump house and chlorinator building. These are small, white, concrete buildings with castellated parapets. The larger is to the rear and the smaller to the front of the block.

The buildings are constructed from off-form concrete with a horizontal, wide-board pattern showing. Vent stacks are built as miniature towers at some corners of the structures; other corners have matching engaged buttresses. They sit on concrete tanks, their floors about 1.5 metres (4 ft 11 in) above the ground.

The smaller building (chlorinator) is rectangular in plan with the longer elevations facing south-west and north-east. Two square, metal-framed windows, covered with metal shutters open into both of these elevations. A square window into the north-west elevation is also covered with sheeting. The entrance to the building, in the south-east elevation, is via a concrete stair which ascends parallel to the wall finishing at a concrete landing. A wooden door opens from the landing. This is secured with a knob and a more recent lock. The top of the tank under the smaller building forms a raised semicircular concrete plinth which extends to the south-west. The tank contains a chamber with a tapered floor.

Internally, the building comprises a single room with unpainted concrete walls. It contains two large items of early machinery. One of these has a small brass name plate bearing the words "Filtration and water softening system".

The larger building (pump house) is also rectangular in plan with the long elevations facing south-west and north-east. Access to the building is via a concrete stair to the narrow, south-east elevation. The stair ascends at right angles to the wall finishing at a long landing. At the top of the landing, a double metal door opens into the interior. It has a curved handle and is secured by a barrel bolt. A plaque above the door commemorates the commissioning of the works on 25 January 1936. The opposite elevation has a single small, metal- framed glass window with nine panes.

The south-west elevation has three square, steel-framed windows. These pivot around a horizontal axis at mid-height. The top of the tank attached to the side of the building projects to form a rectangular plinth. A steel stairway ascends at right angles to the south-eastern side of the tank finishing close to the wall of the building. Four metal shafts project from the top of the tank. Three of these have metal wheels fitted to the top; threaded lengths of rod extend above these wheels. Hinged, steel panels provide access into the tanks.

The opposite (north-east) elevation has two square windows and a narrow hatchway around 1.5 metres (4 ft 11 in) in height. The windows are covered with sheeting which is boxed out from the wall a short distance. Two metal plates are bolted over the hatchway; a large square plate above a smaller rectangular one. Both plates have curved handles at each end.

The top of the tank forms a rectangular plinth extending from this elevation. There are small rectangular and arched openings into the base of the north-eastern end of the plinth.

Internally, the larger building is painted light grey on the lower part of the wall and pale green above, separated by a black band. The floor comprises a series of steel plates with a metal ladder descending to a sub-floor area that is now disused. The building contains a grey cabinet housing electrical equipment. This is not considered to be of cultural heritage significance.

The building also contains a manually operated overhead crane. Transverse movement of the crane is achieved by means of a simple chain and wheel mechanism. A similar chain and wheel raises and lowers a hook. This mechanism comprises a pulley and two back-to-back hooks. One of the hooks secures the mechanism to the overhead cross beam of the crane; the other dangles downwards for holding the load.

== Heritage listing ==
East Gordon Street Sewerage Works was listed on the Queensland Heritage Register on 10 July 2009 having satisfied the following criteria.

The place is important in demonstrating the evolution or pattern of Queensland's history.

The East Gordon Street Sewerage Works in Mackay, opened in 1936, was one of the first in regional Queensland. As such, it is important in demonstrating the progressive upgrading of basic infrastructure in regional Queensland, in particular the provision of sewerage schemes, which took place in regional towns and cities from the interwar period. Most other regional centres did not develop such schemes until after World War II, with some local government areas not constructing sewerage infrastructure until after 1960.

As one of the first sewerage works in regional Queensland, it is tangible evidence of the importance of Mackay as a regional centre in the 1930s and the influence the city enjoyed through their local Member of Parliament, William Forgan Smith, who was Premier at the time. During the 1920s and 1930s, Mackay was the fastest growing town in Queensland.

The place is important in demonstrating the principal characteristics of a particular class of cultural places.

The place is important in demonstrating the principal characteristics of a sewage treatment works of the interwar period. Characteristics include pump house, chlorination plant building, and the deliberate attempt to visually disguise the true purpose of these structures through the stylistic treatment of the exterior walls with their castellated parapets, which is unusual for such utilitarian structures.

The place also is important in demonstrating the work of prominent civil engineer AE Harding Frew, who designed the scheme. Frew made a substantial contribution to civil engineering infrastructure in Queensland including designing the William Jolly Bridge in Brisbane.
