= Korah Halcomb Wills =

English-born hotelier and politician in Australia

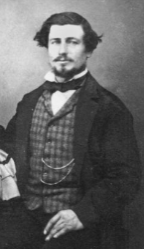
Korah Halcomb Wills

Korah Halcomb Wills (13 February 1828 – 7 December 1896) was an English-born hotelier and politician in the northern regions of colonial-era Queensland. He was elected as one of the first mayors of the colonial settlement of Bowen in the 1860s and later became mayor of the Mackay township. Wills is best known for his graphic depiction in his diary of his participation in a native police raid on a group of Aboriginal people near Bowen. In it he describes the shooting of these people and the kidnapping of the surviving children. Wills also gives a detailed account of how he dissected the body of one of the Aboriginal men killed during the raid, took the bones back to Bowen and put them on display in order to raise funds for the hospital in that town. Wills' diary is considered by historians to be an important document in the history of the Australian frontier wars.

== Early life ==
Korah Halcomb Wills was born on 13 February 1828 in Dover, England to parents William Wills and Jane Horn. In the late 1840s he married Louisa Hunter also from Dover.

== Arrival in Australia ==
In 1848, Wills emigrated to Australia with his wife, arriving in Adelaide, South Australia in April 1849. In 1851 they moved to the colony of Victoria where Wills became a gold miner at the diggings near Ballarat. The Wills' moved again in the late 1850s to the city of Melbourne where Wills established a butchery business on the corner of High Street and Brighton Road in St Kilda. He specialised in the breeding and slaughtering of prize-winning pigs and also became a member of the Volunteer Mounted Rifles.

== Mayor of Bowen ==
In 1862, Wills decided to move with his young family north to the colony of Queensland. A large farewell was organised in his honour at the Barkly Hotel in St Kilda where he was presented with a Terry breech-loading rifle. They arrived in Queensland and were among the first boatload of settlers to arrive in the new port of Mackay. Wills however, soon moved further north and bought a town allotment in Bowen in the northern region of the colony. Wills quickly positioned himself in the local society by establishing two hotels and participating in a number of committees. Wills was elected an alderman of the town in 1864 and became a director of the local building society the following year. In 1866 he was elected Mayor of Bowen.

== Participation in Native Police raids, kidnap and butchery of a human corpse ==
Around this time, Wills participated with the Native Police in a number of "dispersals" of local Aboriginal people. The Native Police were a government funded paramilitary force that were employed to conduct armed punitive expeditions against Indigenous Australians which usually resulted in massacre. Wills wrote in his diary that:

"many were the dispersing expeditions... I have been in and many are the curiosities that I have picked up in the camps of the Natives...dispersal was a name given for something not to be mentioned here, but it had to be done for the protection of our own hearths and Wives and families, & you may be sure we were not backward in doing what we were ordered to do and what our forefathers would have done to keep possession of the soil that was laying to waste and no good being done with it when we our own white people were crying for room to stretch our legs on... we have got the Country and may we for ever hold it for... we have risked our lives... in arresting it from the savage... in my time they were dispersed by hundreds if not by thousands."

Wills continued that the Native Police officer in charge would:

"select half a dozen fellows the staunchest he could find & press them into the service for the time being … as Special Constables & put [them] under arms... and off we would go for the scene of the outrage wheresoever it might be & to run the Culprits Down & disperse them."

In one particular raid, Wills gave a more detailed account:

"the blacks had been playing up & killing a shepherd & robbing his hut when we turned out & run them to earth... some paid dearly for their bravado. They had no idea that we could reach them to a dead certainty at a distance of a mile with our little patent breach loading “Terry’s” when they were brought to bear on them some of them jumped I am sure six feet into the air."

After the massacre was concluded, Wills:

"selected a little girl with the intention of civilizing & one of my friends thought he would select a boy for the same purpose & in the selection of which I stood a very narrow chance of being flattened out by a ‘Nulla Nulla’ from I presume the Mother of the Child I had hold of, but I received the blow from the deadly weapon across my arm which I threw up to protect my head and my Friend who has since been connected with the Government of the Colony & has held the high office of Chief Immigration Commissioner and protector of the Blacks … in my time was a kidnapper to the hilt."

Furthermore, Wills decided to:

"to get a few specimens of certain limbs and head of a Black fellow, which was not a very delicate operation I can tell you. I shall never forget the time when I first found the subject I intended to anatomize, when my friends were looking on, and I commenced operations dissecting. I went to work business-like to take off the head first, & then the Arms and then the legs, and gathered them together and put them into my Pack saddle."

After butchering the corpse of the Aboriginal man, Wills placed the kidnapped girl on his horse and they rode back to Bowen:

"with my little protegee [sic] of a girl … who rode on the front of my saddle... and crying nearly all the way... different people who hailed me with how do and so on and where did you get that intelegent [sic] little nigger from."

The girl later died of a respiratory illness. At an event to raise funds for the building of a hospital at Bowen, Wills decided to exhibit the remains of the Aboriginal man he had previously dissected. Wills took:

"my blackfellows [skull], arms and legs to the disgust of many. I remember I had to cover them up with a flag, the Union Jack and if anyone wished to see what was under that flag they had to ask the favor of one of the committee who were afraid the Ladies might get a shock if they left it uncovered... it was a grand success in a monetary point of view."

Historians have pointed out that even though some colonists thought Wills' actions were repulsive, he nevertheless remained in a position of high social standing. No thought was given to him or other participants being charged with any crime, showing that frontier colonial Queensland society had an ongoing acceptance of such activities.

== Mayor of Mackay ==
In 1868, Wills left Bowen and established the Wills Hotel in Townsville. After a couple of years there, Wills moved to Mackay where he expanded his hotel business. Wills again became involved in the political society and was elected Mayor of Mackay in 1876 and 1877. He remained in Mackay until 1885 when his profitable career as a hotelier enabled him to retire back to England with his wife and younger children.

== Later life and family ==
Wills spent his retirement in his comfortable home on Esmond Road in the London suburb of Bedford Park. He was able to continue to socialise with other British colonists of Australia at the Queensland Club in London. He died at his home on 7 December 1896. One of his daughters, Georgiana Jane Wills married the well-known banker and sugar planter Henry Brandon. Another daughter, Cora Louisa Wills, married Captain William Rosengren, who was one of Queensland's most active blackbirders of South Sea Islander labour.
