= Tristyn Kronk =

Australian bicycle racer

Tristyn Kronk or also known as TK (born 10 January 1996 in Mackay, Queensland) is an Australian BMX cyclist. He has competed at numerous National and International competitions with a National title and World rankings in his achievements.

In 2013 Kronk was set to make his first trip to the USA in the pursuit of becoming a full-time professional BMX racer, only days before he was scheduled to leave a training accident left him with a serious neck fracture. Since the accident in late 2013 Kronk has returned to Elite level racing and placed 2nd at the National Championships in 2014 and Narrowly missed qualifying for the final at the 2014 World Championships.

Tristyn is currently based in Brisbane and is sponsored by Phirebird and Faith Race. He travels around Australia and to international races in the pursuit of qualifying for the 2016 Rio Olympic Games.

Kronk is also a qualified BMX coach, helping many developing riders and educating them on bike safety and skills.

Kronk has also started his own brand TK, which provides an expanding range of services that currently include: coaching, track building, limited edition team jerseys and some soft goods. His popular hash tag #TKBMX is used on social media outlets by himself and aspiring race fans and followers.

== Achievements ==
=== 2011 ===
- Australian Champion 15 boys

- 5th in Australian for 15-16 Males Cruiser

- Australian Test Team Captain for 15-16 Males

=== 2012 ===
- 8th at the World Championships for 15-16 Males Cruiser 2012

=== 2013 ===
- 7th at the World Championships in Junior Men

- Represented Australia in the National High Performance team at the World Championships

- 2nd at Australian National Championships in Junior Elite Men

- 3rd Overall in the National Probikx Series in Junior Elite Men

=== 2014 ===
- 2nd at the Australian National Championships Junior Men

- Semi - finalist at the World Championships in Rotterdam

=== 2016 ===
- Mackay Sportsperson of the Year
