= Forgan Bridge =

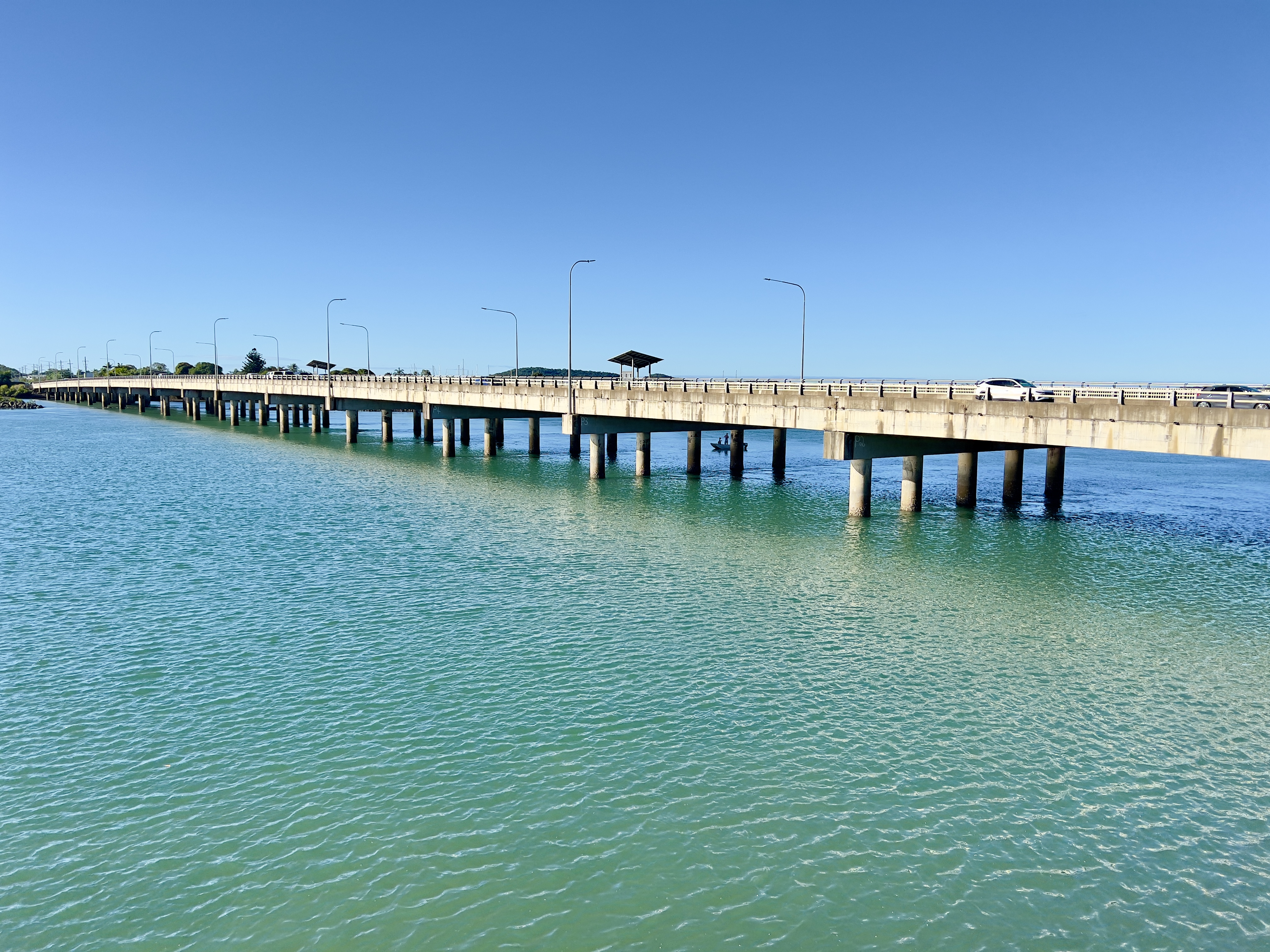
- Forgan Bridge, 2023
- Coordinates: 21°08′15″S 149°11′17″E
- Carries: Motor vehicles, Pedestrians
- Crosses: Pioneer River
- Locale: Mackay, Queensland, Australia
- Preceded by: Sydney Street Bridge (-1938), Forgan Bridge (1938–2011)

Characteristics
- Design: Pre-Cast Beam Superstructure
- Material: Prestressed concrete
- Total length: 485 metres (1,591 ft)
- Width: 26 metres (85 ft)

History
- Designer: GHD
- Constructed by: Golding Contractors
- Construction start: May 2008
- Opened: 14 August 2011

Statistics
- Daily traffic: (30,000 vehicles per day)

Location
- Interactive map of Forgan Bridge

The Forgan Bridge is a road bridge over the Pioneer River in Mackay, Queensland, Australia.

The construction of the duplication and replacement of the old Forgan Bridge commenced in May 2008 and was completed in August 2011.

== History ==
The original Forgan Bridge was opened on 30 March 1938 by Mrs Forgan Smith, wife of the Queensland Premier William Forgan Smith, as a replacement for the earlier Sydney Street Bridge. The bridge was named in memory of Mary Forgan, the mother of former Queensland premier William Forgan Smith.

The construction of a new 485-metre (1,591 ft) long, 4-lane bridge commenced in May 2008. The A$148 million Forgan Bridge Replacement and Duplication Project included replacement of two bridges; the Forgan Bridge and the Barnes Creek Bridge, and widening of Barnes Creek Road. The existing two-lane bridges and road were replaced with new four-lane bridges and road. The project was delivered in two stages; stage 1 included construction of new two-lane bridges and stage 2 included demolition of the existing bridges and construction of new two-lane bridges in their place. The new bridge was opened on 14 August 2011 by Main Roads Minister Craig Wallace, local member of parliament Tim Mulherin, and Mackay mayor Col Meng.
