= St Paul's Uniting Church, Mackay =

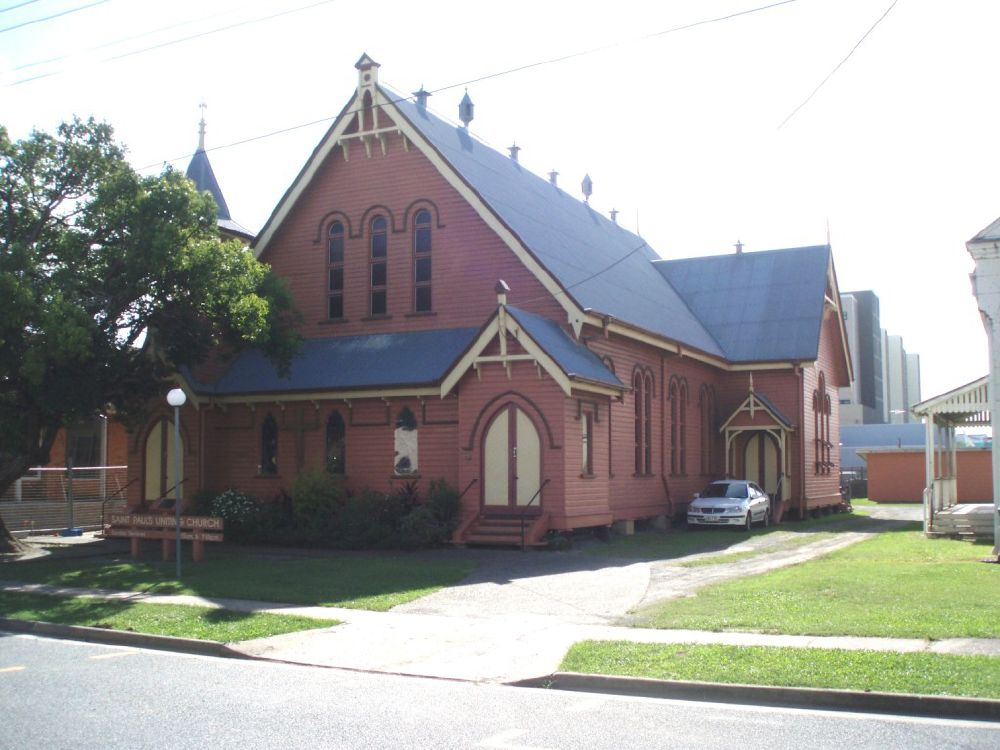
- St Paul's Uniting Church, in 2009
- St Paul's Uniting Church, Mackay
- 21°08′31″S 149°11′01″E
- Address: 21 MacAlister Street, Mackay, Mackay Region, Queensland
- Country: Australia
- Denomination: Uniting (since 1977)
- Previous denomination: Presbyterian (1897–1977)
- Website: stpaulsmackayunitingchurch.org.au

History
- Former name: St Paul's Presbyterian Church
- Status: Church
- Founded: c. 1897
- Founder: Reverend James Gibson
- Dedication: Paul the Apostle

Architecture
- Functional status: Active
- Architect: Walter Carey Voller
- Architectural type: Church
- Style: Arts and Crafts
- Years built: 1898–1918

Specifications
- Materials: Timber

Administration
- Parish: St Paul's, Mackay

Queensland Heritage Register
- Official name: St Paul's Uniting Church, St Paul's Presbyterian Church
- Type: State heritage (built, landscape)
- Designated: 21 August 1992
- Reference no.: 600668
- Significant period: 1890s–1910s (fabric) ongoing (social)
- Significant components: Tower – bell / belfry, tree groups – avenue of, church, furniture/fittings

St Paul's Uniting Church is a heritage-listed Uniting church at 21 MacAlister Street, Mackay, Mackay Region, Queensland, Australia. It was designed by Walter Carey Voller and built from 1898 to 1918. It is also known as St Paul's Presbyterian Church. It was added to the Queensland Heritage Register on 21 August 1992.

== History ==
The church is a large single-storey timber building which was opened as St Paul's Presbyterian Church in 1898.

The Presbyterian congregation in Mackay was established in 1872. The first church was erected in 1875 and the manse was built three years later. Following the appointment of Reverend James Gibson in 1895 the congregation flourished and plans for a new church were begun. The design by Brisbane architect Walter Carey Voller was accepted and construction began in 1897. Gibson, who claimed to have hammered in many of the nails himself, was prominent in the church in Queensland, three times Moderator, he was also a founder of Emmanuel College and Theological Hall. He later became Moderator-General of the Presbyterian Church in Australia.

The first Boys' Brigade in Queensland commenced at this church in 1897.

In 1918, Mackay was hit by the worst cyclone in its history which destroyed whole blocks of the city centre and much of the housing stock. The Anglican and Methodist churches, and the old Presbyterian church then used as a church hall, were also destroyed. The new church suffered some damage. While undertaking repairs, the choir loft and Elders' Court were added. A pipe organ was installed in 1953.

== Description ==
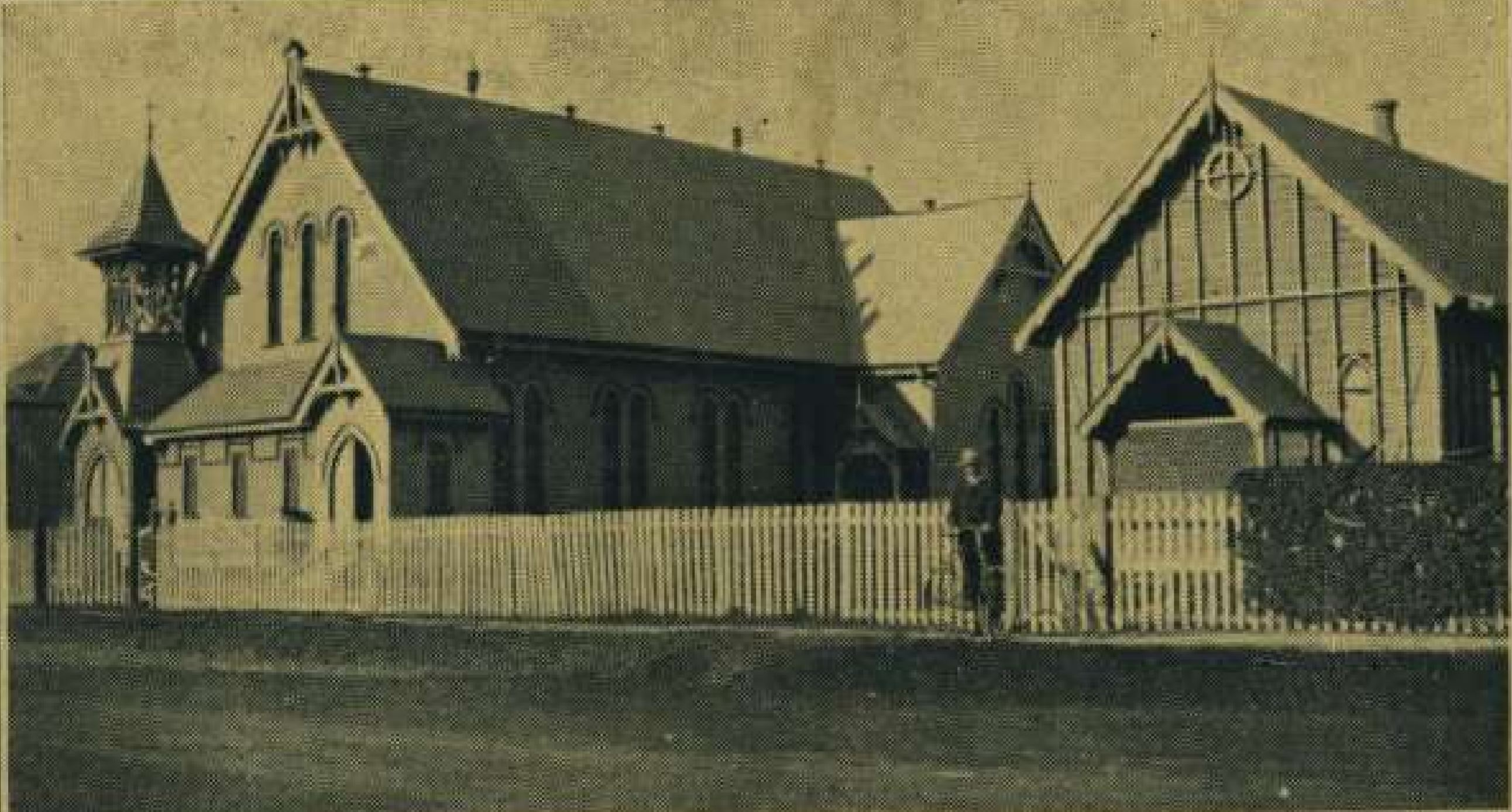
New and old church buildings

This single-storey timber-framed building is set on low timber and concrete stumps and clad in chamferboards. It has steeply pitched gable roofs sheeted with galvanised corrugated iron. The church is located in an established streetscape of mature trees, between two similarly scaled buildings, the Sunday School hall (1919) and the Youth Centre (1958).

A traditional Latin cross plan, the church consists of a wide nave, two short transept wings, a chancel that contains the choir loft, a projecting organ bay and private rooms. The western end of the nave faces the street and is the main point of entry.

The front facade consists of a high gable wall with a lower attached skillion roof and wall that joins two gabled entry vestibules. The twin vestibules are positioned on the north west and south west corners of the nave. Each has a set of arched timber entry doors approached by a short flight of timber stairs. The building is symmetrical except for an elaborately detailed timber belfry located over the north west entry vestibule. This picturesque element has a steep hip roof with a broken pitch. Two additional gable roofed entry porches are located on the eastern side of the transepts.

The confined space of the entry vestibules opens onto a spacious nave with a high vaulted ceiling and finely detailed exposed beams and trusses. At the end of the nave a chancel arch frames the organ and choir loft. A dais with low timber balustrades is located in front of the choir screen under the crossing. The pulpit and baptismal font are positioned on this dais.

The transepts are visually separated from the crossing by structural timber columns and decorative timber arches that span between the columns. Tall slender arched windows with panels of coloured glass are arranged in pairs or groups of three. There are three stained glass windows of more recent design in the front facade. Externally the windows have timber hood moulds following the line of the arches.

The church has most of its original fittings and is very intact. Minor additions are in keeping with the character of the building.

== Heritage listing ==
St Paul's Uniting Church was listed on the Queensland Heritage Register on 21 August 1992 having satisfied the following criteria.

The place demonstrates rare, uncommon or endangered aspects of Queensland's cultural heritage.

St Paul's Uniting Church demonstrates uncommon aspects of Queensland's cultural heritage as it is a rare example of an intact 19th century timber church in North Queensland. St Paul's Uniting Church is one of the few public buildings in Mackay which withstood the 1918 cyclone.

The place is important in demonstrating the principal characteristics of a particular class of cultural places.

St Paul's Uniting Church demonstrates the principal characteristics of a provincial 19th century timber church.

The place is important because of its aesthetic significance.

St Paul's Uniting Church accomplished design in terms of massing and composition, and its picturesque classical and gothic detailing exhibit aesthetic characteristics which are valued by the community.

The place has a strong or special association with a particular community or cultural group for social, cultural or spiritual reasons.

St Paul's Uniting Church has been strongly associated with the Presbyterian community and later the Uniting Church parish of Mackay.

The place has a special association with the life or work of a particular person, group or organisation of importance in Queensland's history.

St Paul's Uniting Church has a special association with James Gibson, who initiated the project.
