= Mackay, Queensland =

City in Queensland, Australia

Mackay
- City
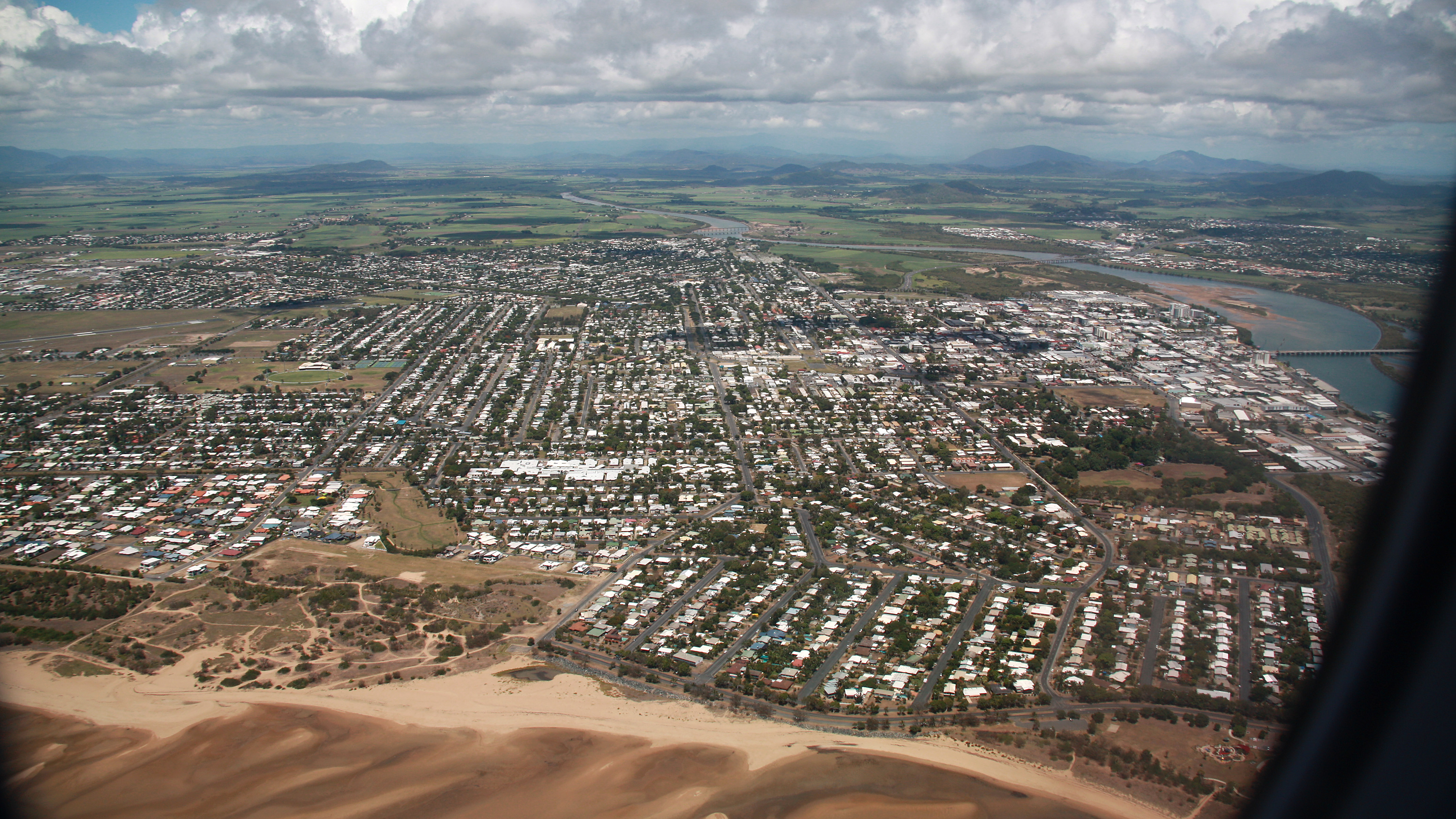
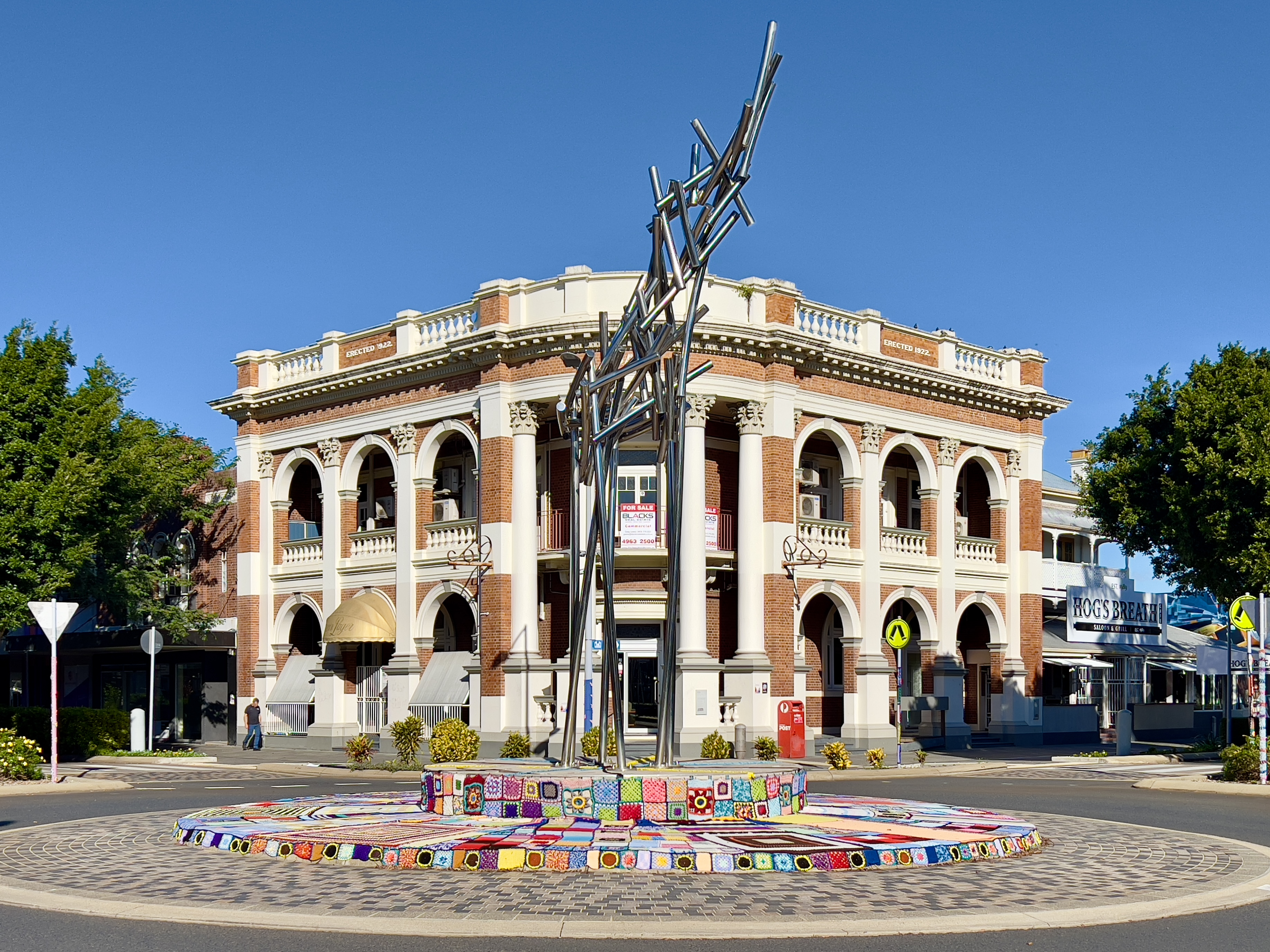
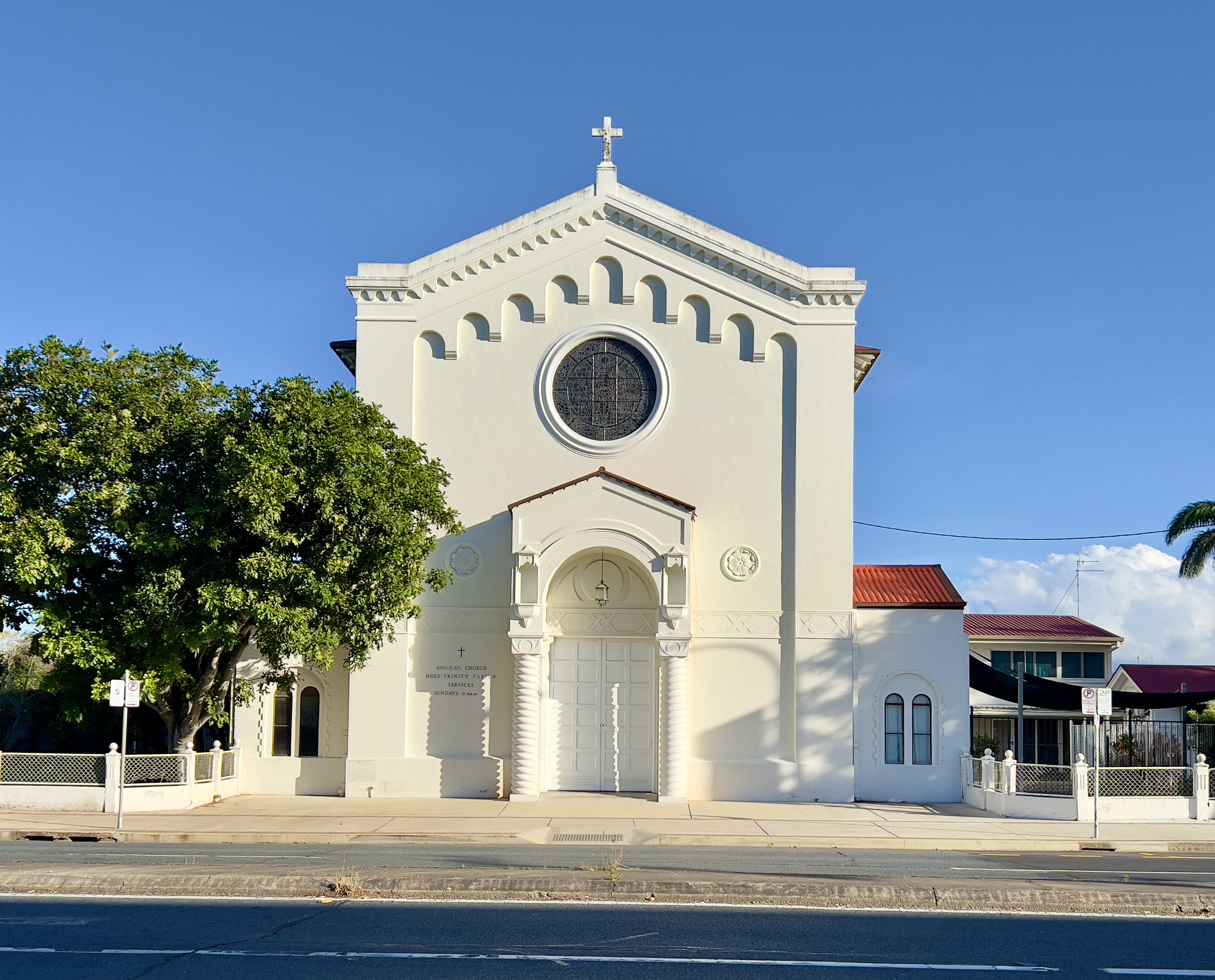
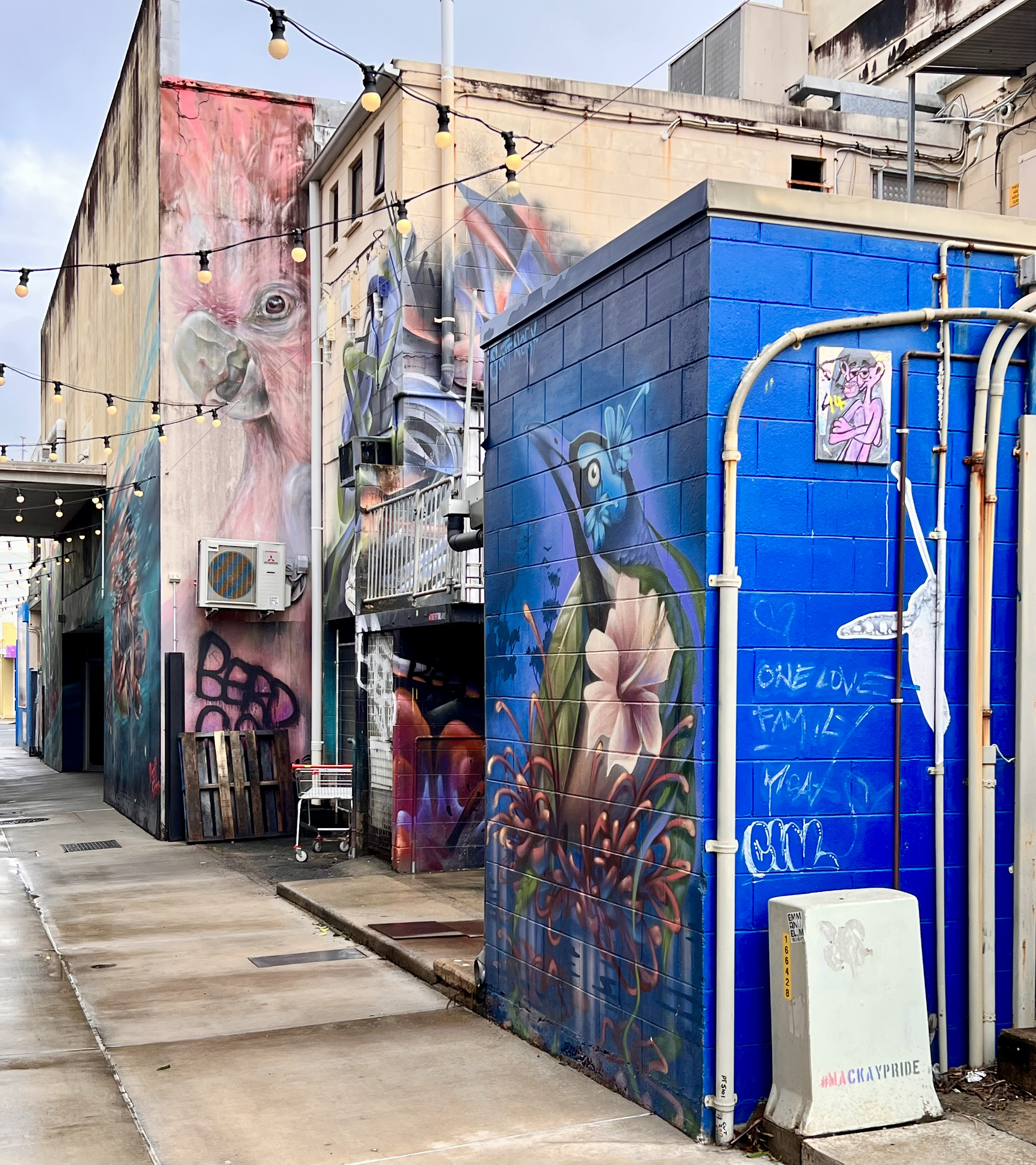
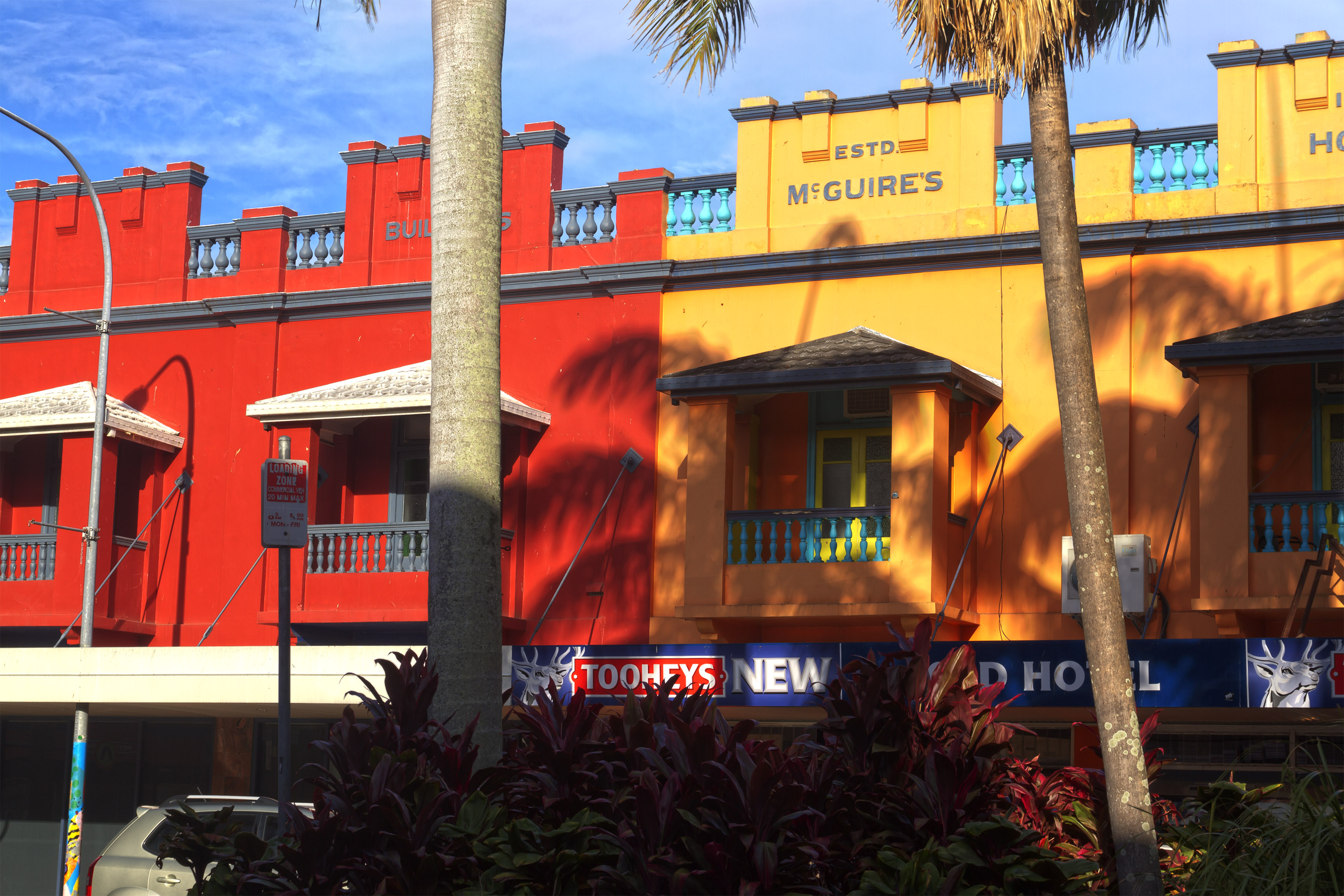
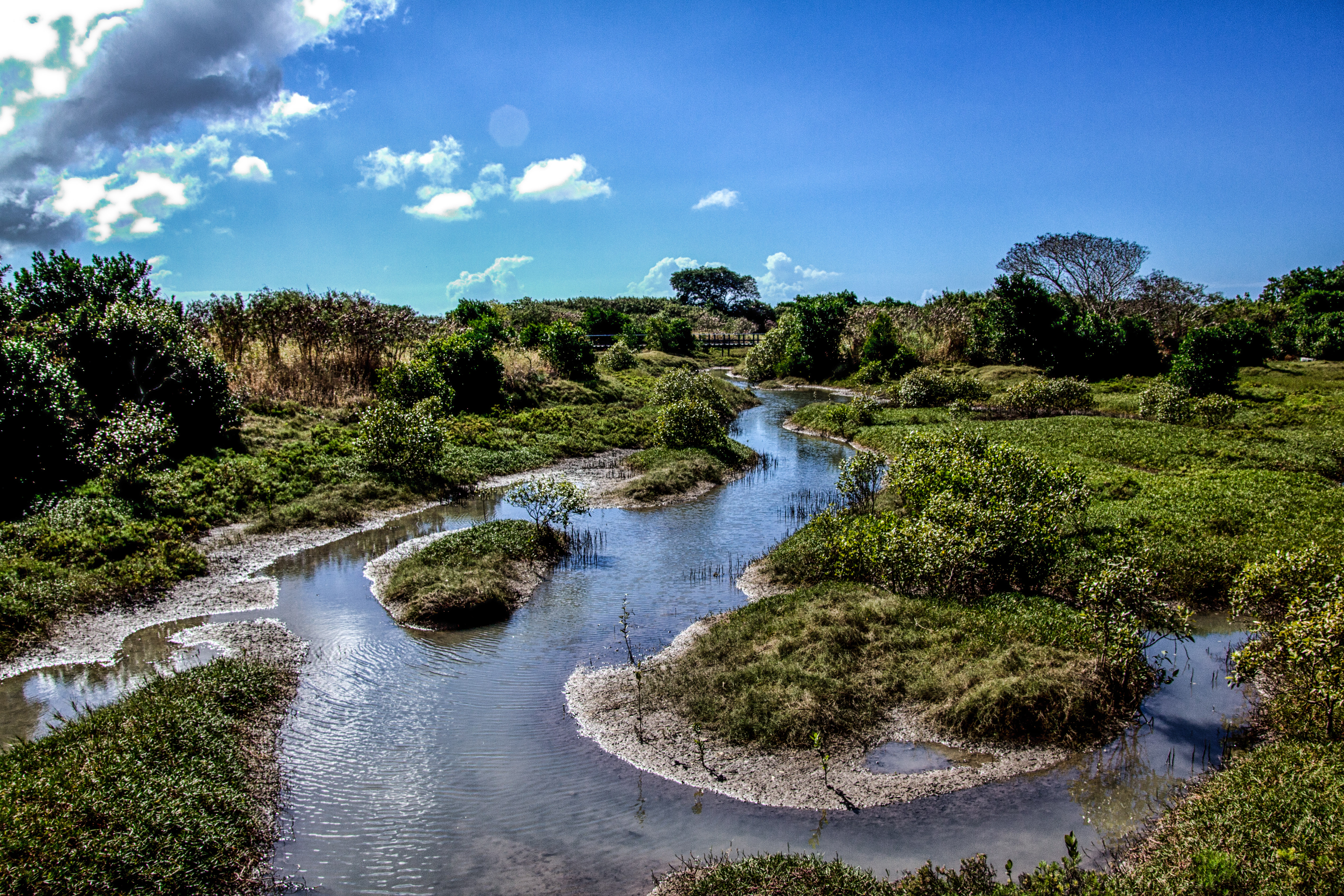
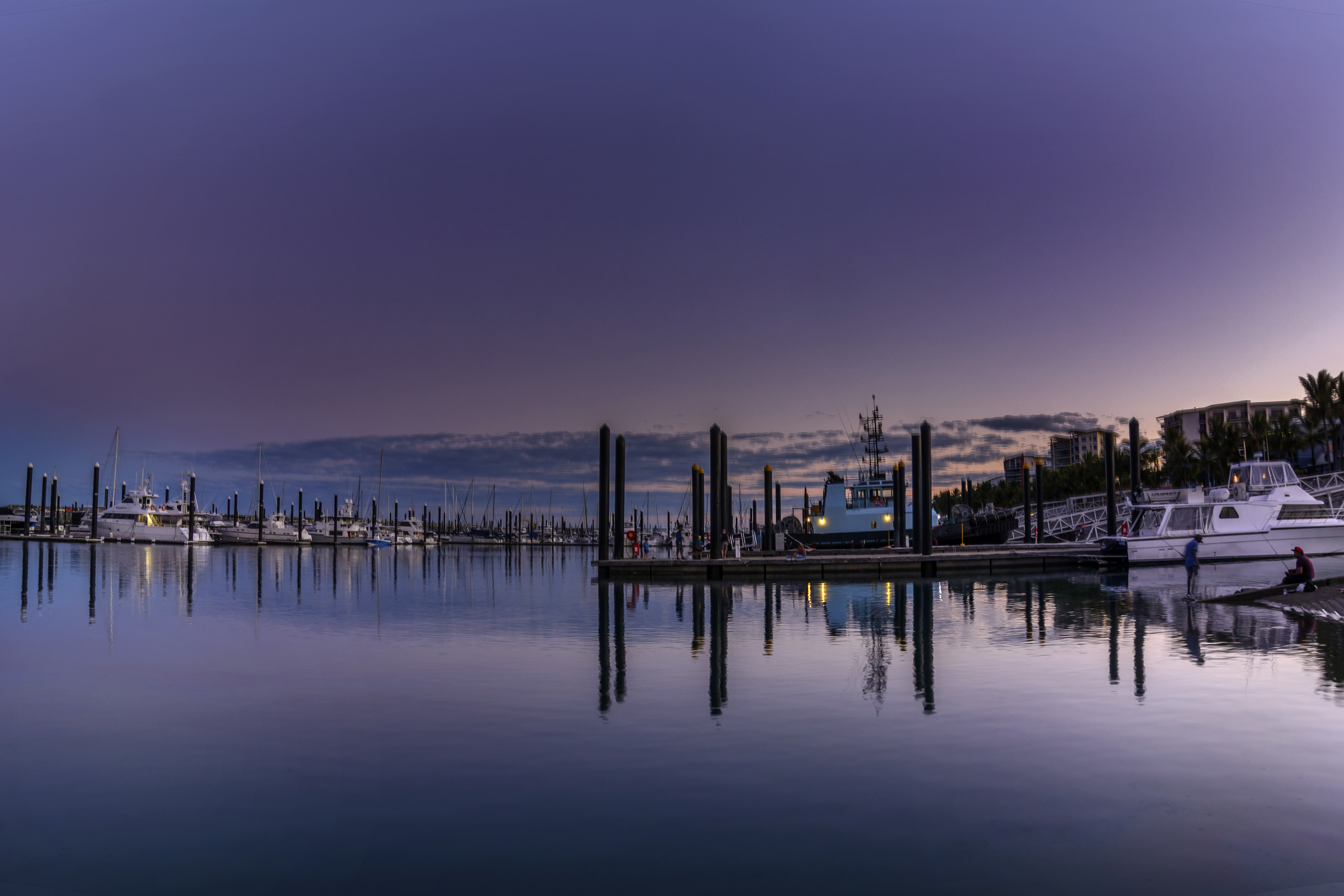
- Aerial view of Mackay, 2009 The Cane Fire sculpture Holy Trinity Church Street art down Fifth Lane Spanish Mission architecture along Wood Street Bluewater Sculpture trail Mackay Harbour

- Coordinates: 21.1411°S 149.1858°E
- Country: Australia
- State: Queensland
- LGA: Mackay Region
- Location: 336 km (209 mi) NNW of Rockhampton; 387 km (240 mi) SE of Townsville; 966 km (600 mi) NNW of Brisbane
- Established: 1862

Government
  - State electorates: Mackay (central and eastern suburbs); Mirani (south-western suburbs); Whitsunday (north-eastern suburbs); Burdekin (north-western areas)
  - Federal divisions: Capricornia; Dawson

Area (2021 urban)
  - Total: 212.4 km^{2} (82.0 sq mi)
- Elevation: 11.0 m (36.1 ft)

Population
  - Total: 84,333 (2021) (22nd)
  - Density: 397.05/km^{2} (1,028.35/sq mi)
- Time zone: UTC+10:00 (AEST)
- Postcode: 4740
- Mean max temp: 27.1 °C (80.8 °F)
- Mean min temp: 17.8 °C (64.0 °F)
- Annual rainfall: 1,606.9 mm (63.26 in)

Mackay (/məˈkaɪ/ mə-KYE) is a city in the Mackay Region on the eastern or Coral Sea coast of Queensland, Australia. It is located about 803 kilometres (499 mi) north of Brisbane, on the Pioneer River. Mackay is described as being in either Central Queensland or North Queensland, as these regions are not precisely defined. More generally, the area is known as the Mackay–Whitsunday Region. Nicknames of Mackay include the Sugar capital, Alexandra and Macktown.

Founded in 1862 on land traditionally owned by the Yuwibara (Yuibera) Indigenous people, the settlement was originally known as Alexandra, in honour of Princess Alexandra of Denmark, and was later renamed Mackay after John Mackay. Sugar became the economic foundation of the city, with plantations using indentured or enslaved South Sea Islanders. From about 1891, Mediterranean migrants from Italy and Malta began to work the sugarcane plantations, and by the 1930s one third of Australia's Italian migrants lived in North Queensland. The city was nearly destroyed in the 1918 cyclone, and the following reconstruction used primarily Art Deco and Spanish Mission architectural styles for which the city is known.

Mackay has a rich history and culture, known for its architecture, food, and as a cultural-melting pot. It has long established cross-cultural communities that have influenced the city; including Yuwi, South Sea Islanders, Italians, Maltese, and more recently Filipinos. Mackay is considered the capital of South Sea Islander culture, being home to the largest population in the nation. The city is noted for its seafood, tropical produce, public art and laneways, jazz scene, and festivals including the Mackay Festival of Arts and Jazz in the Park.

Major landmarks in Mackay include, Bluewater Quay and river markets, Mackay Harbour, the Leichhardt Tree, the Bluewater Sculpture trail and the Kommo Toera trail through the Mackay Wetlands. The city's hinterland includes, Mount Blackwood, Eungella National Park including Finch Hatton Gorge, along with the expansive mountain bike trails between Eungella and Finch Hatton. Mackay's coastal highlights include, Cape Hillsborough, the national parks of Round Top and Flat Top islands and the UNESCO World Heritage Site of the Great Barrier Reef.

== Name ==
The city was named after John Mackay. In 1860, he was the leader of an expedition into the Pioneer Valley. John Mackay's journal as his expedition party entered the Pioneer Valley on 20 May 1860 describes "a large river about one hundred yards broad, with good provision of water. McCrossan proposed it should be called the Mackay River, and the party agreed to it." He returned in 1862 with a herd of cattle and established the first settlement at Greenmount. By October 1862 a settlement was established on the banks of the "Mackay" river close to the mouth. But the unregistered name of the Mackay River didn't last long. Commodore Burnett of HMS "Pioneer" was surveying the Queensland coastline and as there was already a "Mackay" River in Rockingham Bay, he decided on 27 December 1862 to rename the river "Pioneer". In May 1863 Thomas Henry Fitzgerald completed the first survey of the township and proposed it would be called Alexandra after Princess Alexandra of Denmark, who married Prince Edward (later King Edward VII). Fitzgerald finally used the name Alexandra for his sugar cane plantation in 1866. It is also the name of a Mackay suburb of Alexandra today.

There has always been much contention over the pronunciation of the name Mackay. Correspondence received by Mackay City Library in 2007, from descendants of John Mackay, confirms that the correct pronunciation is /məˈkaɪ/, from the Gaelic name MacAoidh, which is pronounced "/aɪ/" not "/eɪ/".

== History ==
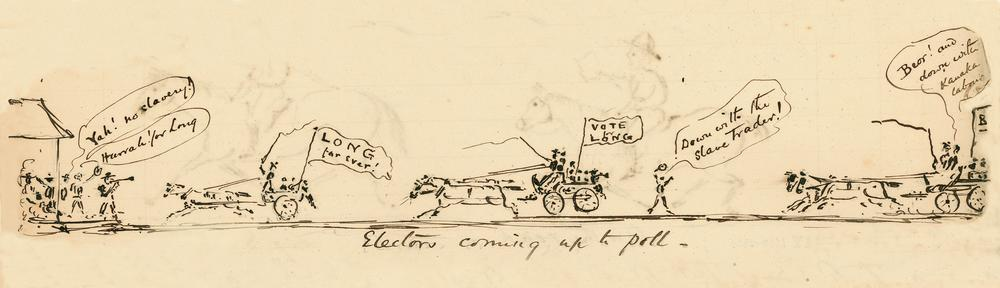
Anti-slavery drawing during the 1877 elections in Mackay by Charles Rawson

The area which is now Mackay City was originally inhabited by the local Yuibera people.

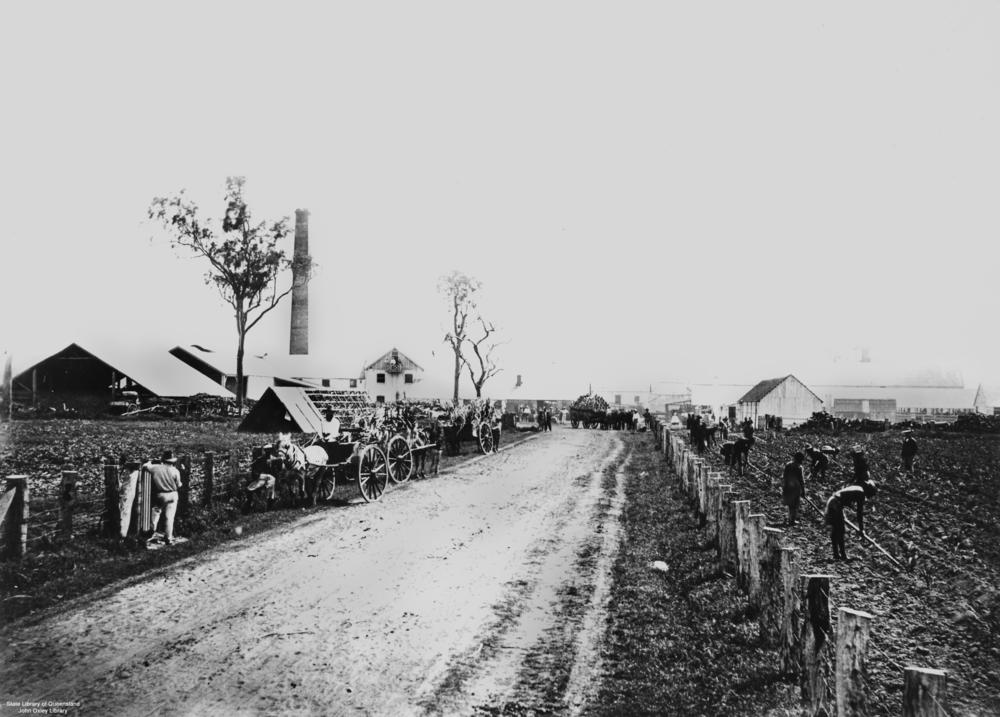
Road through Te Kowai Sugar Plantation c. 1880. To the right, South Sea Islanders till the soil.

Yuwibara (also known as Yuibera, Yuri, Juipera, Yuwiburra) is an Australian Indigenous language spoken on Yuwibara country. It is closely related to the Biri languages/dialects. The Yuwibara language region includes the landscape within the local government boundaries of the Mackay Region.

Captain James Cook, sailed past the Mackay coast on 1 June 1770 and named several local landmarks, including Cape Palmerston, Slade Point and Cape Hillsborough. It was during this trip that the Endeavour's botanist, Sir Joseph Banks, briefly recorded seeing Indigenous Australians.

In 1860, John Mackay led an overland expedition to the region to obtain land. Finding most of the inland areas already having been selected by other British colonists, Mackay turned toward the coast and entered what he called the May Plains but is now known as the Pioneer Valley. Mackay was the first European to visit the region that is now named after him. He selected three large areas of land which he named Greenmount, Cape Palmerston and Shamrock Vale. In 1862 he returned with James Starr and 1200 head of livestock to establish these cattle stations but soon got into financial difficulty and sold them off.

In 1863, Mackay was declared a port of entry for settlers. Amongst the first boatload of arrivals was hotelier and future mayor Korah Halcomb Wills. Mackay was initially named Alexandra but the government soon changed it to Mackay to honour its founder. The first sale of town allotments was in 1864.

During the 1860s, the local Aboriginal population, as Henry Ling Roth puts it, "did what they could to defend their country and their lives." The local detachment of the Native Police under Robert Arthur Johnstone started patrolling the area in 1867, and encountered several Aboriginal camps on the north side of the Pioneer River, one of which contained more than 200 people. A newspaper report of the time says that Johnstone dealt with these people "in the usual and only effectual mode for restraining their savage propensities." The usual mode of the Native Police was terror, violence and massacre. In 1868 a large group of Aboriginal people killed 7 cattle at Greenmount. Johnstone and his troopers were sent out after them but it is unclear if he succeeded in "administering a lesson to the blackskins." Colonist, George Bridgman, provided some sanctuary to the remnants of the tribes and in 1871 an Aboriginal Reserve was gazetted near Rosella. This reserve shut in 1885.

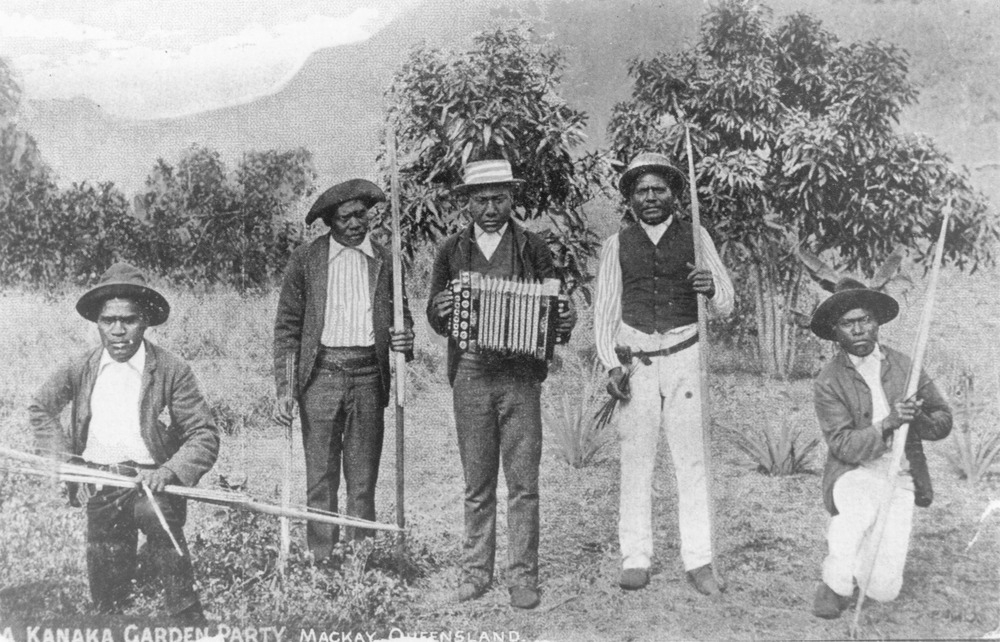
South Sea Islanders at a garden party near Mackay, c. 1900

In 1865, John Spiller, an Englishman who was connected with sugar plantations in colonial Java, planted the first sugarcane crop in the Mackay region. John Ewen Davidson and T. H. Fitzgerald built the first production sugar mill in 1868. Most of the labour on the sugar plantations was provided by South Sea Islanders. The first 70 of these workers arrived in Mackay on 12 May 1867 aboard the Prima Donna. and were sent to work at Fitzgerald's Alexandra Plantation.

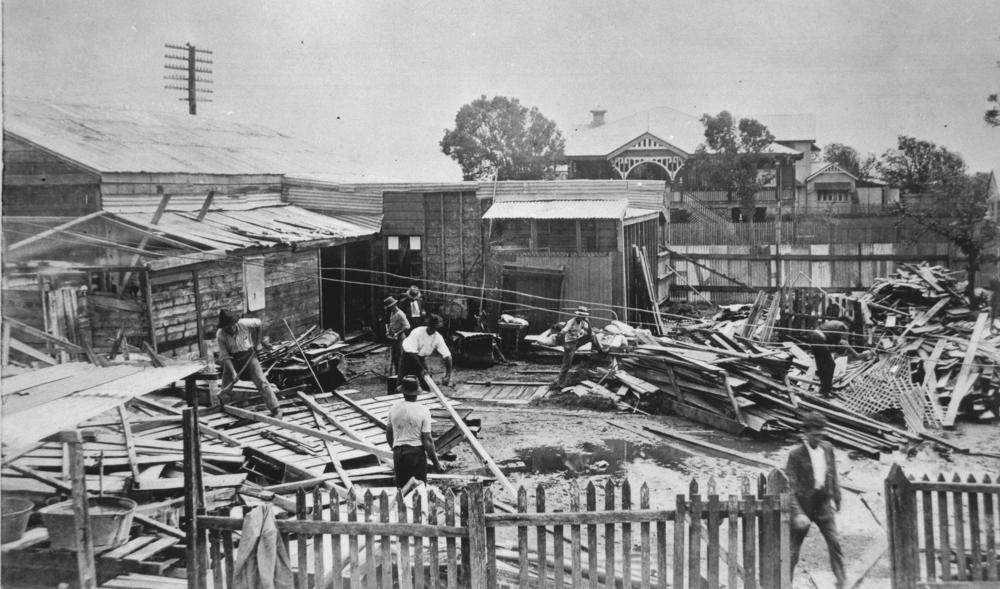
Workers clear a cyclone damaged house at Mackay, 1918

By the mid-1880s there were over 30 sugar plantations and 26 sugar mills in the Mackay region. Over one third of the 6000 inhabitants were South Sea Islander labourers. On Boxing Day 1883, a race riot occurred between members of these workers and some of the European population at the Mackay racecourse. Hundreds of people on both sides threw bottles at each other until around 50 Anglo-Australian horsemen wielding stirrup irons galloped into the group of Islanders, knocking them down with their improvised weapons and riding over them. Officially two Islanders were killed but it was believed a greater number later died of injuries. One white man involved, George Goyner, was found guilty of assault and sentenced to two months in prison. Around thirty Islanders were also imprisoned.

In 1918, Mackay was hit by a major tropical cyclone causing severe damage and loss of life with hurricane-force winds and a large storm surge. The resulting death toll was further increased by an outbreak of bubonic plague. Communication links into Mackay were destroyed. The outside world did not learn of the Mackay cyclone until five days after impact, leading to some speculation the city had been completely destroyed. The disaster remains one of the most destructive cyclones to strike a populated centre in Australia.

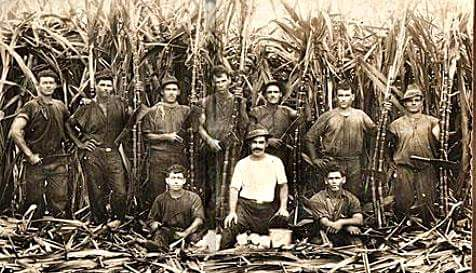
Migrants from Malta and Gozo working as canecutters in Mackay, c. 1919

The foundation stone of the Mackay War Memorial was laid on the river bank on 18 November 1928 by the mayor George Albert Milton. It was unveiled on 1 May 1929 by the mayor. Due to flooding, the memorial was relocated to Jubilee Park in 1945. Due to the construction of the Civic Centre, it was relocated to another part of the park in March 1973.

The largest loss of life in an Australian aircraft accident was a B17 aircraft, with 40 of 41 people on board perishing, on 14 June 1943, after departing from Mackay Aerodrome, and crashing in the Bakers Creek area.

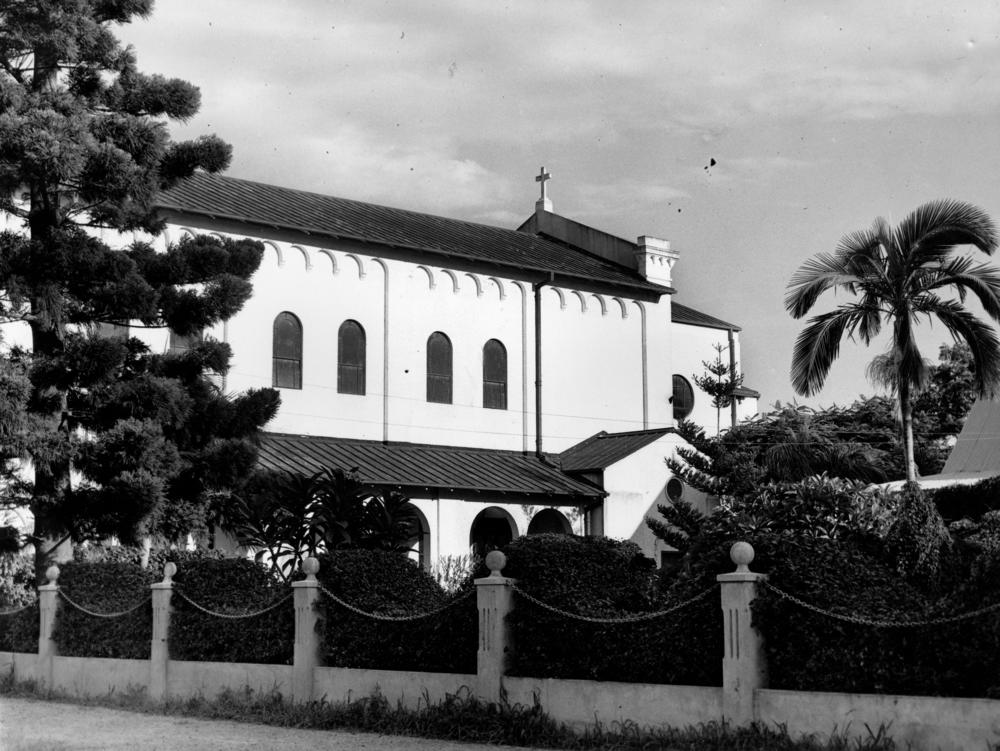
The Holy Trinity Church built in 1926 and designed by architect Lange Leopold Powell, utilising Romanesque, Spanish Mission and Mediterranean architectural styles

The Rats of Tobruk Memorial commemorates those who died at and since the Battle of Tobruk. The memorial was dedicated on 4 March 2001.

On 18 February 1958, Mackay was hit with massive flooding caused by heavy rainfall upstream with 878 mm of rain falling at Finch Hatton in 24 hours. The flood peaked at 9.14 metres (29.99 ft). The water flowed down the valley and flooded Mackay within hours. Residents were rescued off rooftops by boats and taken to emergency accommodation. The flood broke Australian records.

In 1970 Queen Elizabeth II, the Duke of Edinburgh, and Princess Anne toured Australia including Queensland. The Queensland tour began on Sunday 12 April when the royal yacht Britannia entered Moreton Bay at Caloundra, sailing into Newstead Wharf. After visiting Brisbane, Longreach and Mount Isa the Royal Family travelled to Mackay. The visit to Mackay in the evening followed a late afternoon flight from Mount Isa on 16 April. The Royal Family were taken to the Anglican Parish Hall at the intersection of Sydney and Gordon Streets for a civic reception, held in honour of their arrival.

On 15 February 2008, almost exactly 50 years from the last major flood, Mackay was devastated by severe flooding caused by over 600 mm of rain in 6 hours with around 2000 homes affected.

Mackay was battered by Tropical Cyclone Ului, a category three cyclone which crossed the coast at nearby Airlie Beach, around 1:30 am on Sunday 21 March 2010. Over 60,000 homes lost power and some phone services also failed during the storm, but no deaths were reported.

The Dudley Denny City Library opened in 2016.

In 2016 census, the city of Mackay had a population of 78,685.

On 25th February 2020, the Yuwibara people were granted a mixture of exclusive and non-exclusive Native Title to an area of 6450 square kilometres, after first applying in 2013 for legal recognition of their traditional homelands and cultural rights.

== Heritage listings ==
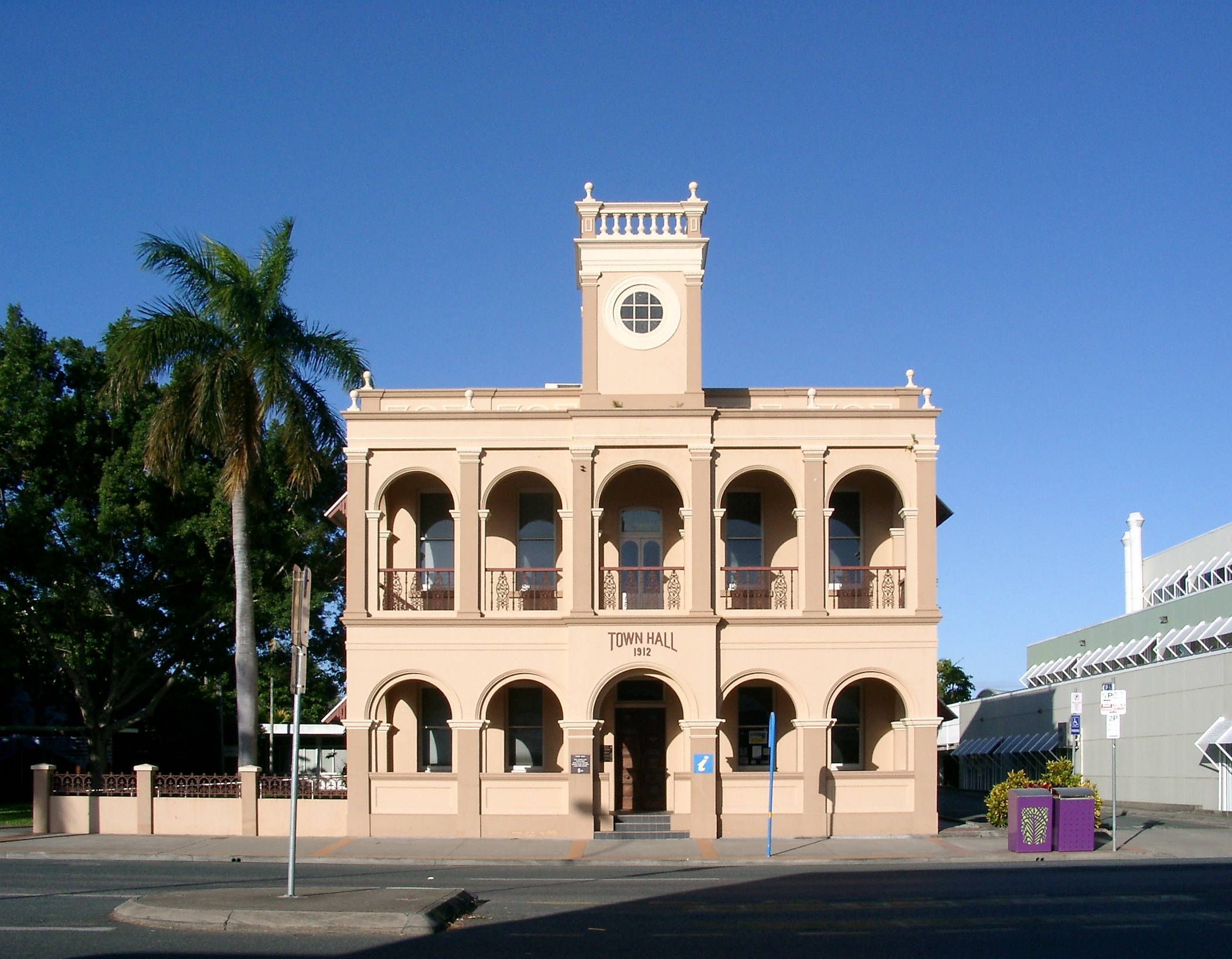
Town Hall, built in 1912, now serves as a tourist information centre.

Mackay has a number of heritage-listed sites, including:

- Mackay Technical College, Alfred Street
- World War I Cenotaph, Alfred Street
- Mackay Central State School, 251 Alfred Street
- Mackay General Cemetery, Cemetery Road
- Selwyn House, Mackay, Cowleys Road
- East Gordon Street Sewerage Works, 38 East Gordon Street
- Holy Trinity Church, 39 Gordon Street
- Richmond Mill Ruins, Habana Road
- St Pauls Uniting Church, 21 MacAlister Street
- Mackay Memorial Swimming Centre, 2 Milton Street (21.1411°S 149.1777°E):
- WH Paxton & Co buildings, 10 River Street
- Mackay Customs House, 31 River Street
- Sugar Research Institute, 239 Nebo Road
- Mackay Town Hall, 63 Sydney Street
- Mackay Court House and Police Station, Victoria Street
- Commonwealth Bank Building, 63 Victoria Street
- Queensland National Bank, 79 Victoria Street
- Pioneer Shire Council Building, 1 Wood Street
- Mackay Masonic Temple, 57 Wood Street

== Geography ==
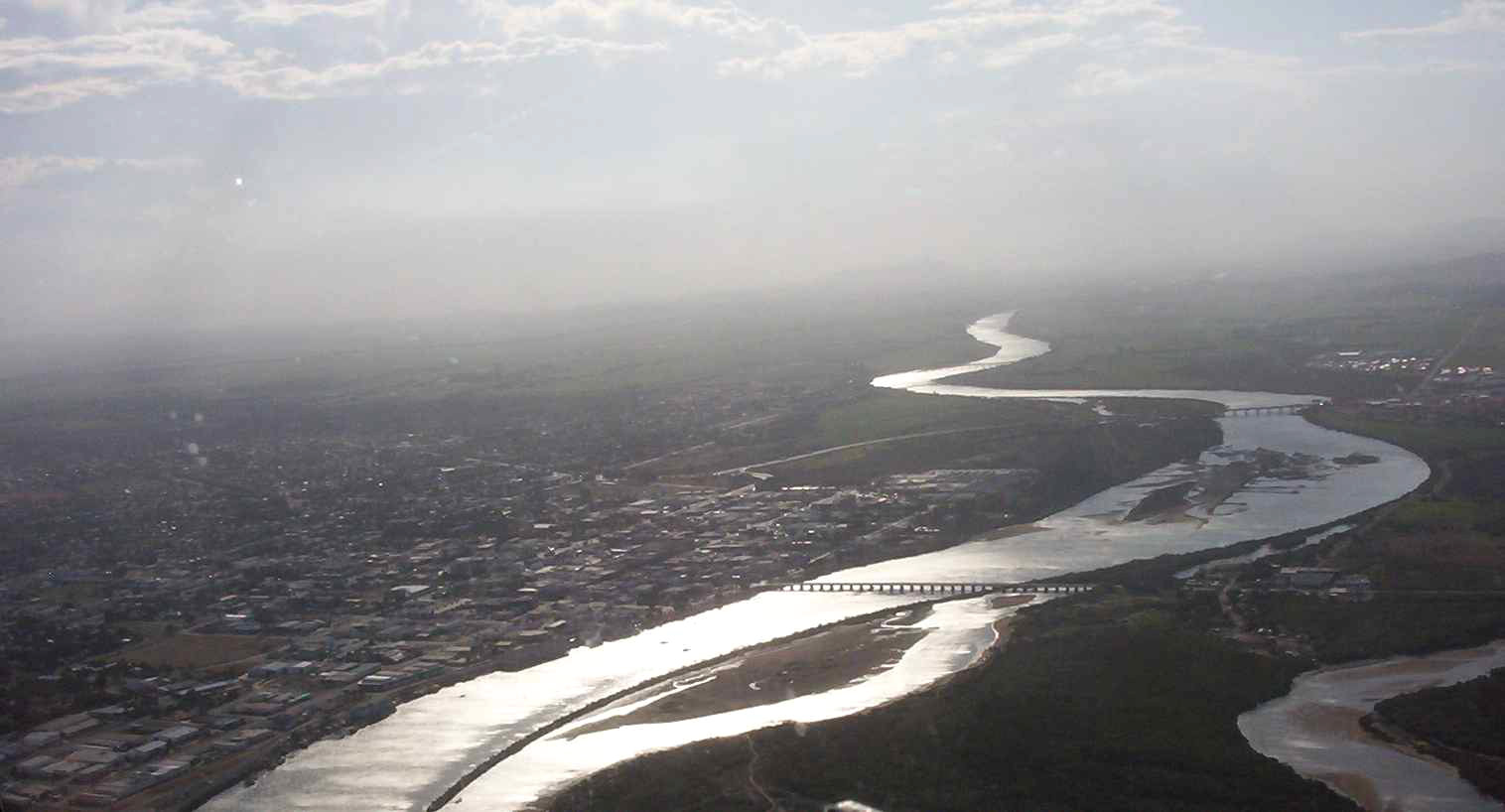
The Pioneer River

Mackay is situated on the 21st parallel south adjacent to the Coral Sea coast and about both banks of the Pioneer River. The Clarke Range lies to the west of the city. The city is expanding to accommodate for growth with most of the expansion happening in the Beachside, Southern, Central and Pioneer Valley suburbs. Suburbs to the north of the city such as Midge Point are also fast growing with residential estates in demand.

There is disagreement about how to describe the location of Mackay, with debate ongoing as to whether the city is located in North Queensland or Central Queensland. There is no uniform agreement among either state or federal government agencies on the definition of North Queensland, with government services for Mackay being provided through both Townsville (North Queensland) and Rockhampton (Central Queensland). In its news coverage, the national Australian Broadcasting Corporation consistently describes Mackay as being in North Queensland. The ABC's local radio station in Mackay is also called ABC Tropical North. However, Queensland Health designates Mackay as a health district distinct from both Central Queensland and Townsville health districts and the Mackay-based rescue helicopter, part of the Queensland Health Aeromedical Retrieval Service, is called CQ Rescue.

=== Climate ===
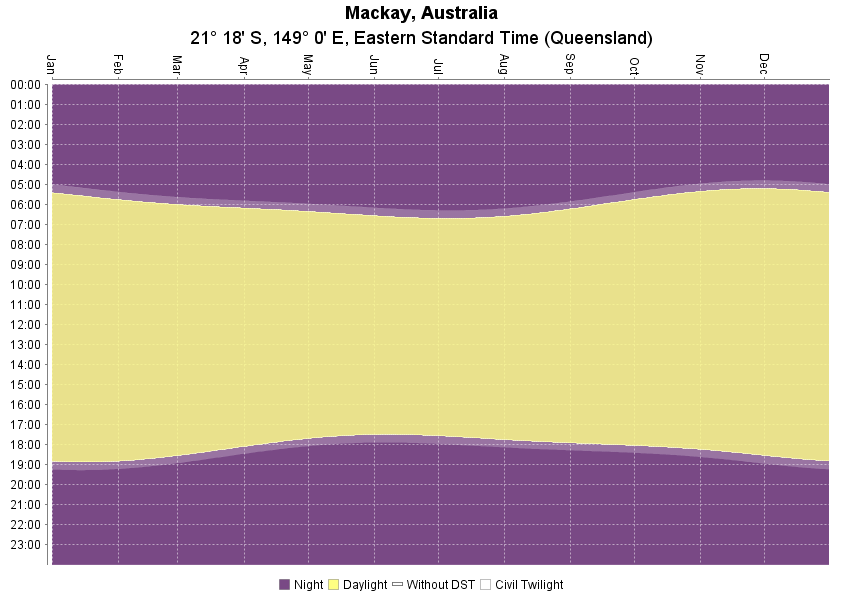
Mackay sunrise and sunset times

Mackay has a dry-winter humid subtropical climate (Koppen: Cwa), closely bordering a tropical savanna climate (Koppen: Aw) with hot, very rainy summers and very mild, dry winters. Warm to hot weather predominates throughout the year, with mean maximums averaging from 30.5 °C (86.9 °F) in January to 22.8 °C (73.0 °F) in July, while minimums range from 11.4 °C (52.5 °F) in July to 23.3 °C (73.9 °F) in February.

The wet season, lasting from December to March, is characterised by hot weather, high humidity and intense rainfall, with occasional monsoonal low pressure systems and tropical cyclones. Meanwhile, the dry season, from June to October, are cooler and less humid. The majority of the 110.0 clear days are recorded during these months; which are sunny and relatively dry. While frost is extremely rare in Mackay, it has been recorded to the west of the city during some winters. April and November are transitional months – moderately rainy and humid.

Extreme temperatures in Mackay have ranged from 39.7 °C (103.5 °F) on 26 November 2018 to −0.4 °C (31.3 °F) on 22 July 1951. The highest rainfall recorded in one day was 627.4 mm (24.7 in) on 22 January 1918.

Climate data for Mackay Aero (21º10'12"S, 149º10'48"E, 5 m AMSL) (1950–2024 normals and extremes, sun 1983–2016)
Month	Jan	Feb	Mar	Apr	May	Jun	Jul	Aug	Sep	Oct	Nov	Dec	Year
Record high °C (°F)	36.9 (98.4)	37.3 (99.1)	35.4 (95.7)	33.6 (92.5)	31.4 (88.5)	32.0 (89.6)	30.1 (86.2)	32.1 (89.8)	35.4 (95.7)	38.5 (101.3)	39.7 (103.5)	38.2 (100.8)	39.7 (103.5)
Mean daily maximum °C (°F)	30.5 (86.9)	30.3 (86.5)	29.5 (85.1)	27.7 (81.9)	25.3 (77.5)	23.3 (73.9)	22.8 (73.0)	23.9 (75.0)	26.1 (79.0)	28.5 (83.3)	29.7 (85.5)	30.8 (87.4)	27.4 (81.2)
Mean daily minimum °C (°F)	23.1 (73.6)	23.2 (73.8)	22.2 (72.0)	19.6 (67.3)	15.8 (60.4)	12.9 (55.2)	11.4 (52.5)	12.1 (53.8)	14.9 (58.8)	18.3 (64.9)	20.6 (69.1)	22.3 (72.1)	18.0 (64.5)
Record low °C (°F)	16.5 (61.7)	18.0 (64.4)	14.2 (57.6)	7.8 (46.0)	3.8 (38.8)	1.7 (35.1)	−0.4 (31.3)	2.0 (35.6)	4.7 (40.5)	9.5 (49.1)	12.8 (55.0)	15.6 (60.1)	−0.4 (31.3)
Average precipitation mm (inches)	309.3 (12.18)	322.7 (12.70)	248.4 (9.78)	164.7 (6.48)	88.5 (3.48)	57.6 (2.27)	40.9 (1.61)	31.4 (1.24)	23.6 (0.93)	36.0 (1.42)	87.1 (3.43)	139.6 (5.50)	1,542.2 (60.72)
Average precipitation days (≥ 1.0 mm)	12.9	14.2	12.6	10.7	7.8	5.9	4.1	3.2	2.6	3.9	6.1	8.8	92.8
Average afternoon relative humidity (%)	69	72	69	69	66	65	63	61	61	60	61	63	65
Average dew point °C (°F)	22.3 (72.1)	22.9 (73.2)	21.6 (70.9)	20.0 (68.0)	16.9 (62.4)	14.6 (58.3)	13.6 (56.5)	13.9 (57.0)	15.8 (60.4)	17.9 (64.2)	19.5 (67.1)	21.0 (69.8)	18.3 (65.0)
Mean monthly sunshine hours	251.1	206.2	232.5	222.0	223.2	219.0	244.9	272.8	285.0	294.5	276.0	272.8	3,000
Percentage possible sunshine	61	57	61	64	65	67	72	77	79	75	70	66	68
Source: Bureau of Meteorology (1950–2024 normals and extremes, sun 1983–2016)

== Economy ==
As of the 2007–08, Mackay contributed $15.4 billion to the Australian economy, or 7.1% of Queensland's gross state product (GSP). This is largely on the back of its export-oriented industries of sugar and mining.

Mackay is famous for its history as one of Australia's largest sugarcane farming regions. However, in recent years, the mining industry has become the mainstay of the local economy.

=== Mining ===
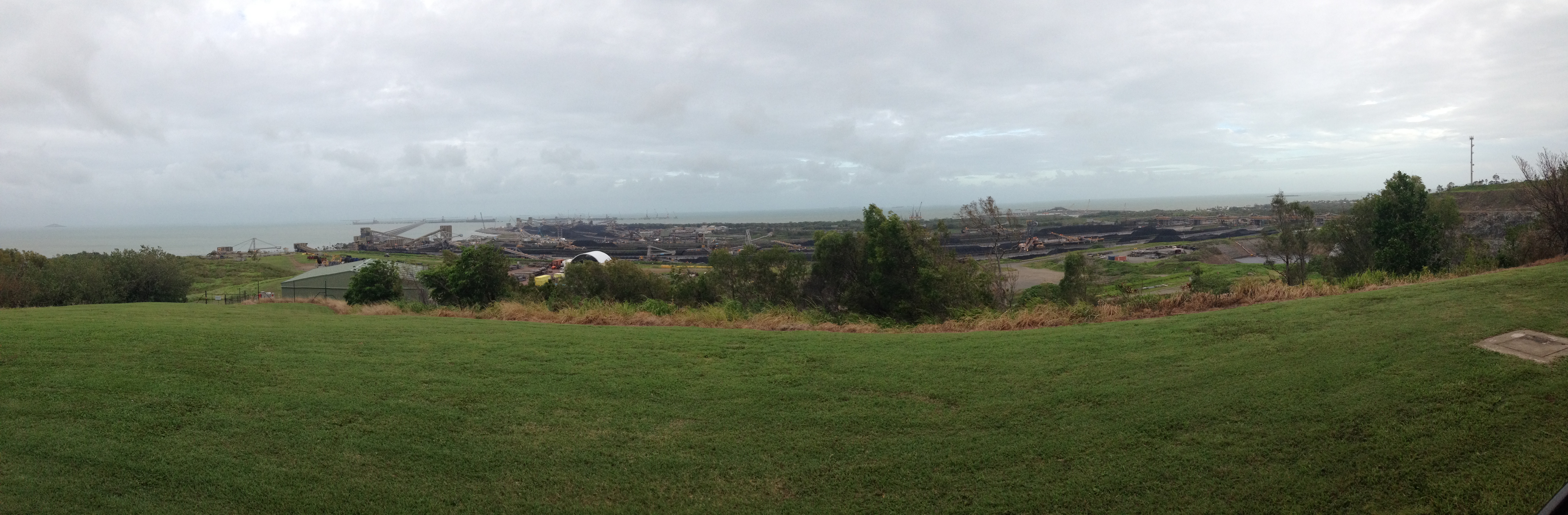
A panorama of Hay Point Coal Terminal

Mackay is widely recognised as the gateway to the Bowen Basin coal mining reserves of Central Queensland. It is the single largest coal reserve in Australia, with 34 operational coal mines extracting more than 100 million tonnes annually.

=== Sugar ===
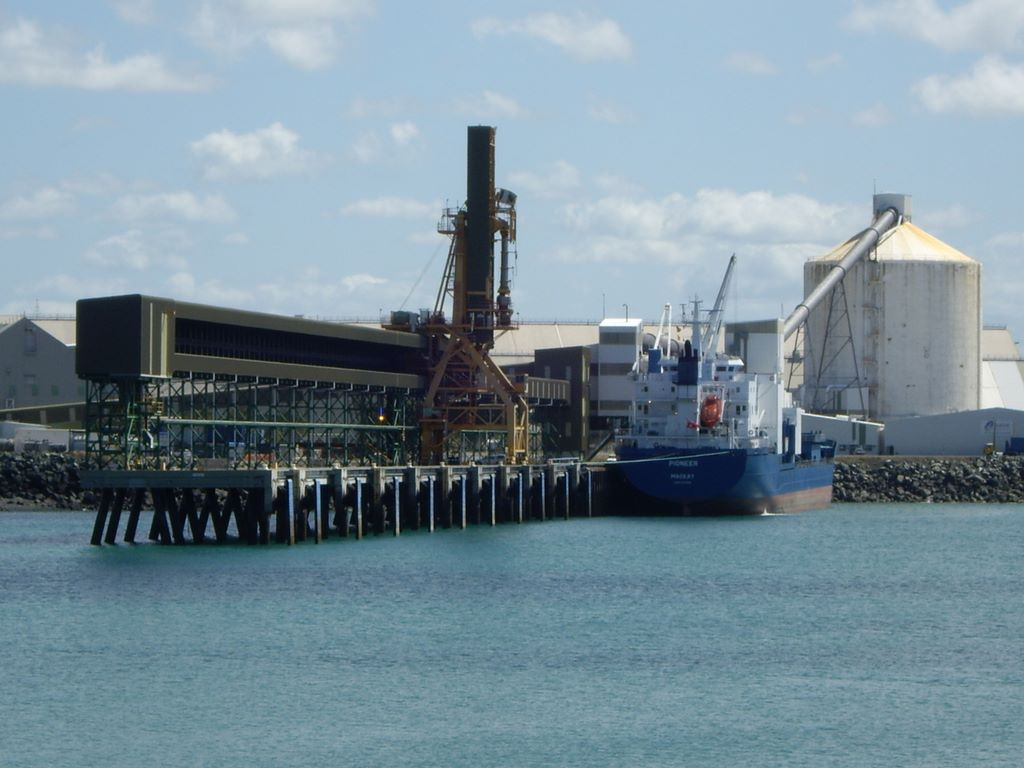
The bulk sugar terminal

Mackay was known as the "sugar capital" of Australia, producing a sizeable portion of Australia's domestic supplies and exports. However, the industry experienced a decline in the 2000s.

The industry in Mackay has its roots back in the 19th century. Historically, plantations were small and had their own mills to crush the cane during harvest. Over the years as the industry grew and developed, co-operatives were formed to consolidate the harvesting, crushing and distribution of the sugar in selected zones. Throughout the 20th century, the privately owned mills in the Mackay district closed one by one until only three remained – Marian, Racecourse Mill, and Farleigh. Today, Pleystowe is the oldest surviving mill in the district (but closed in 2008).

The Marian Sugar Cane Mill is situated in Marian, 25 kilometres (16 mi) west of Mackay. At the Farleigh Mill, there are mill tours accessed via the internet. Racecourse Mill also does tours, and therefore accessible via the internet. Mackay Sugar operates three of these remaining mills, including Racecourse, which became site of the region's first sugar refinery (which is owned by CSR Limited) in the 1990s. Growers in the region have a total cane production area of approximately 86,000 hectares. The growers are capable (in good seasons) of supplying up to 6.5 million tonnes of cane to the factories for processing. On average, Mackay Sugar produces about 850,000 tonnes of raw sugar and 180,000 tonnes of the by-product molasses annually.

=== Marine ===
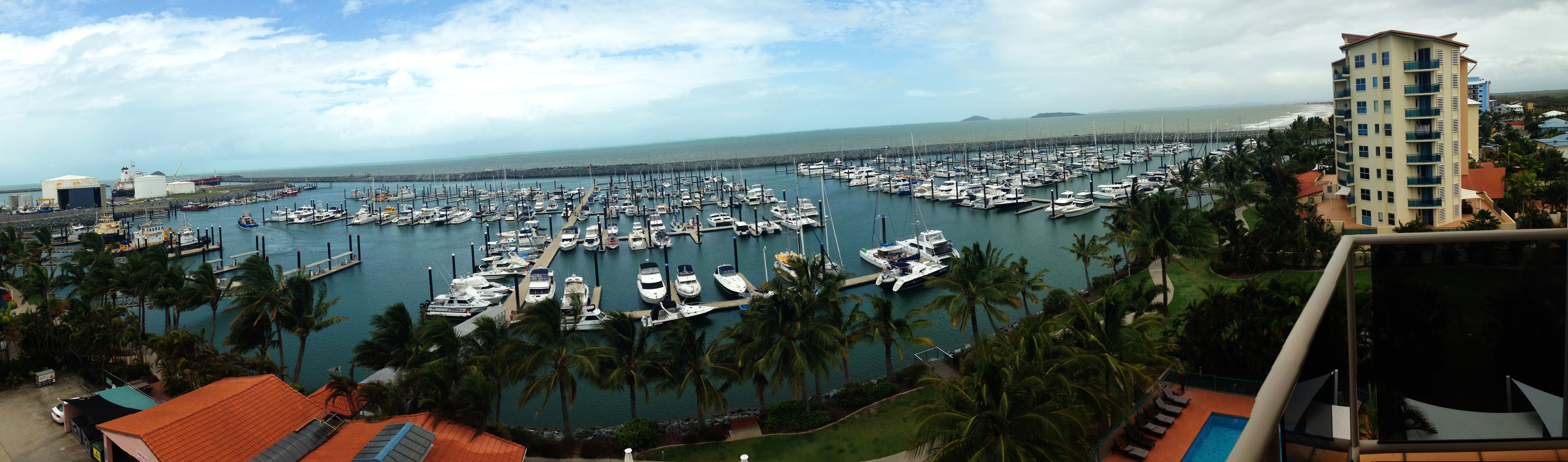
Mackay Marina viewed from the Premier Suite of the Clarion Hotel at Mackay Marina

Currently the Mackay Marina is the largest base in the district for the maintenance, refit and related services for all marine craft. The Mackay Whitsunday Super Yacht Cluster, a group of regional companies focusing on providing integrated repair, refit and provisioning for the increasing number of visiting super yachts.

=== Retail ===
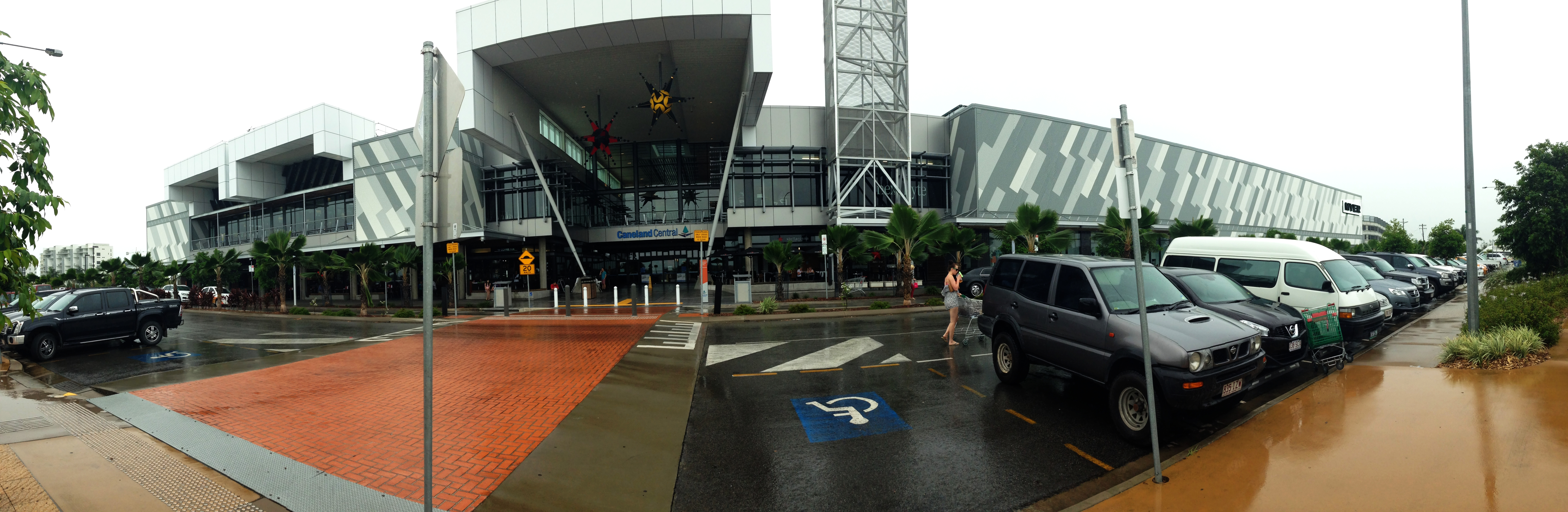
The new entrance to Caneland Central following expansion

Mackay has three main shopping centres. Caneland Central is the largest of these, with more than 130 speciality stores. Myer is among the new anchor tenants. This expansion was opened on 13 October 2011.

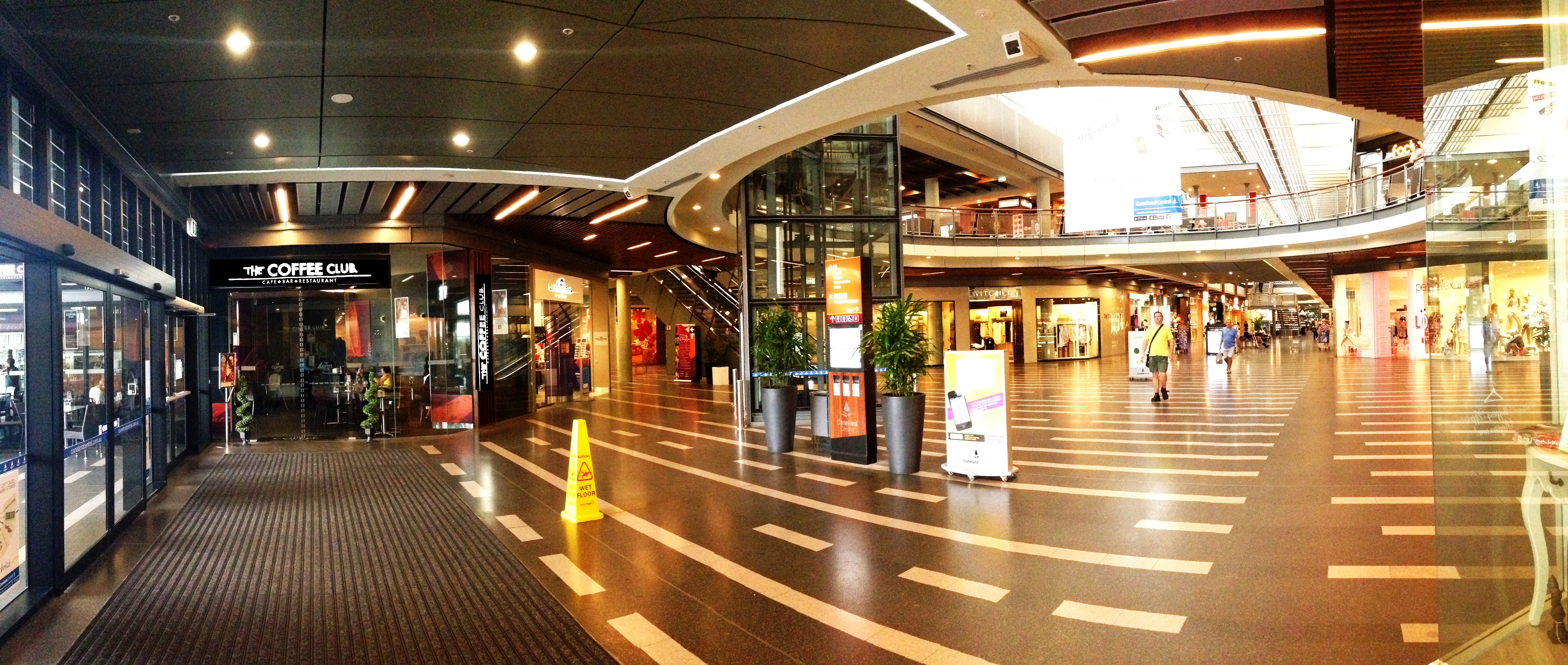
New entrance to Caneland Central Shopping Centre in Mackay

Mount Pleasant Shopping Centre is the second major shopping centre in the Mackay region. It hosts department stores, supermarkets and other speciality outlets. Outside the main centre, a number of bulky-good outlets also operate, along with a six-screen Birch Carroll and Coyle cinema complex.

== Local attractions ==
=== Bluewater Trail ===
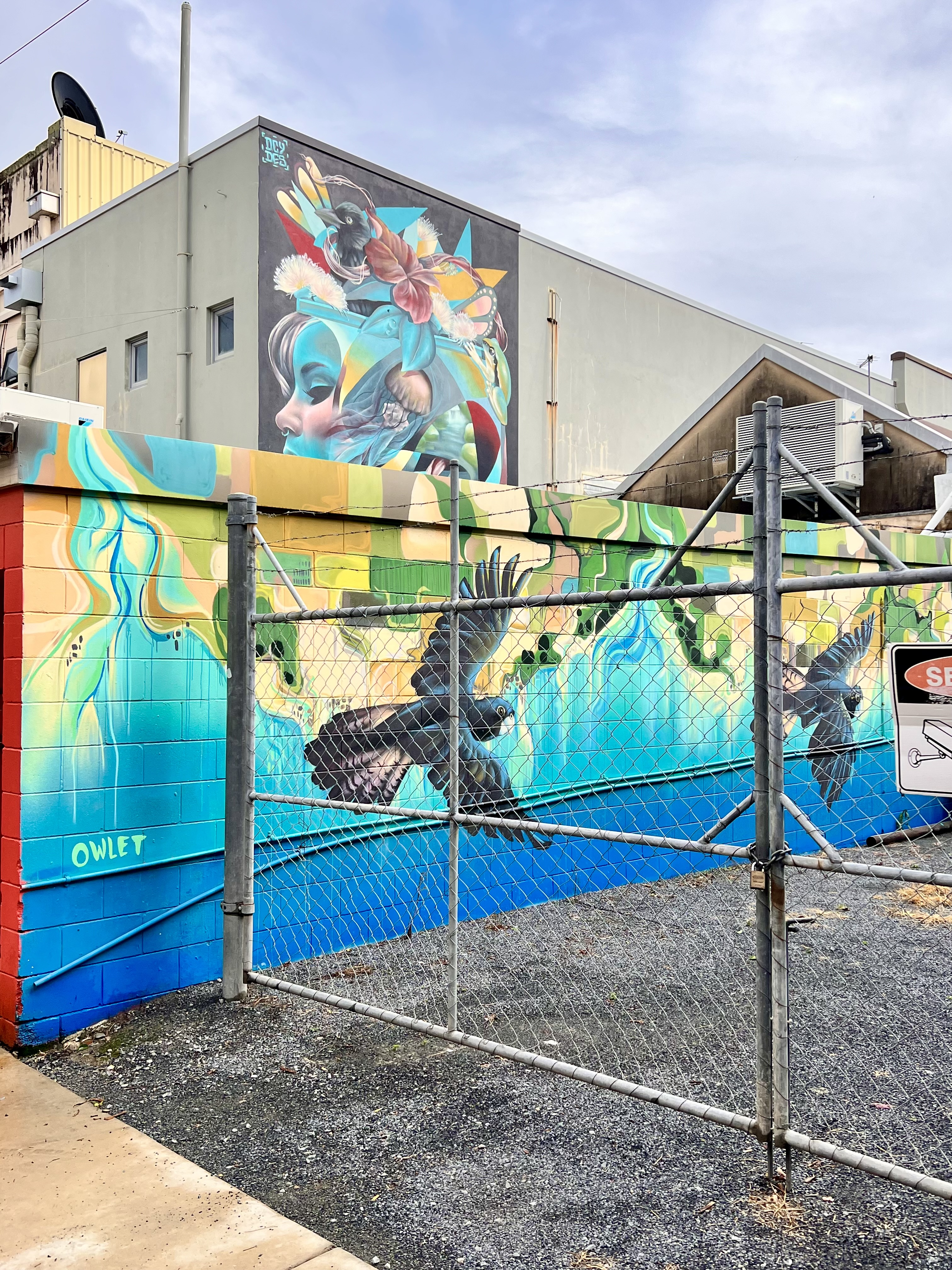
Street art in Mackay

The Bluewater Trail project, managed by the Mackay Regional Council, covers more than 20 kilometres (12 mi) of dedicated pedestrian paths and bikeways. The primary purpose of the Bluewater trail is to facilitate pedestrian and cyclist-friendly activities that can be enjoyed anytime during the day or night. Now completed the track links several new attractions and tourism infrastructure pieces around the city including the Bluewater Lagoon, the Bluewater Quay and the Mackay Regional Botanic Gardens. It also incorporates the Sandfly Creek walkway through East Mackay, and the Catherine Freeman Walk which connects West Mackay to the city under the Ron Camm Bridge.

Located in the south of Mackay, the Mackay Regional Botanic Gardens are the start of the Bluewater Trail. The gardens opened and replaced Queen's Park as Mackay's botanic gardens in 2003 containing an array of rare plants native to the Mackay area and Central Queensland. Before 2003, the area was commonly called The Lagoons, and is centred on the shores of a billabong that years ago formed part of the Pioneer River further to the north.

Heading east past the Mackay Base Hospital and along the Catherine Freeman Walk, the Bluewater Lagoon emerges. Comprising three tiered lagoons, the lagoon is a free family-friendly leisure facility overlooking the Pioneer River in the heart of Mackay's city centre. A waterfall connects the two main lagoon areas, which vary in depth up to 1.8 metres (5 ft 11 in). Similar to the well-known Streets Beach at the South Bank Parklands in Brisbane, the lagoon is a popular summertime attraction for locals and visitors.

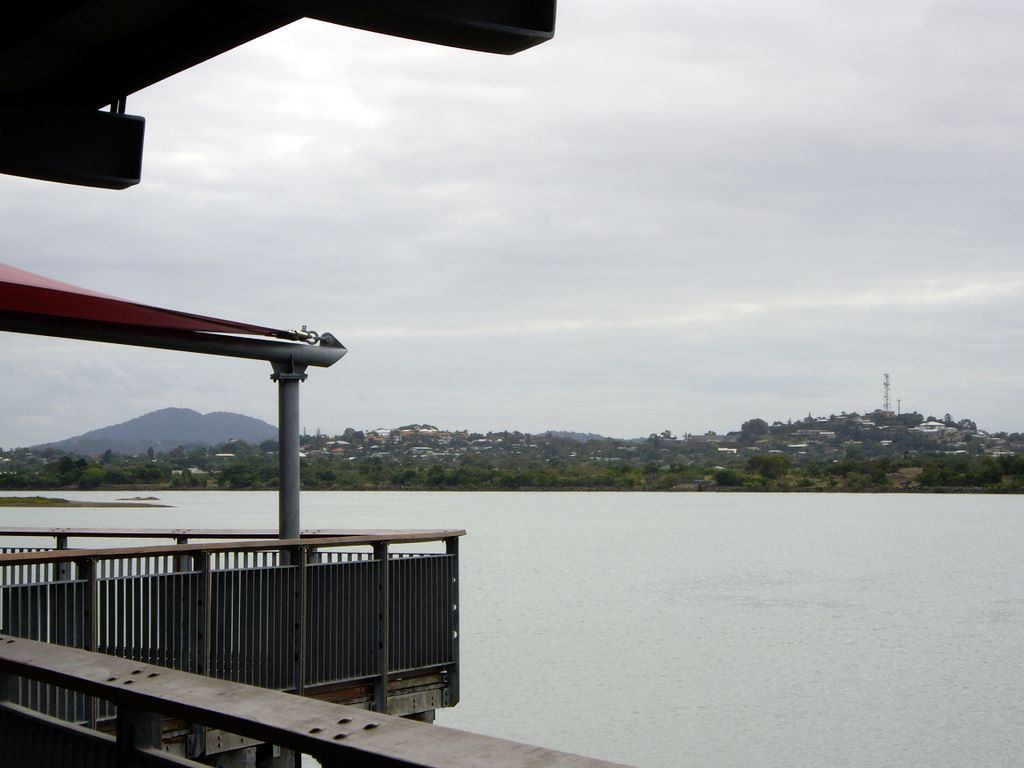
Views from the Bluewater Trail over the Pioneer River to Mount Pleasant

Further east along the trail is Bluewater Quay. As part of Queensland's 150th anniversary celebrations, $12 million has been invested into the transformation of River Street, to the immediate east of the Forgan Bridge. The street now has various public amenities including access to a new viewing platform, upgraded fishing jetty, stage areas, cafes and space for weekend markets. Being 250 metres (820 ft) long, the quay is built around the historic Leichhardt Tree (which falls under the Nauclea evergreen variety), a common meeting point for new migrants to Mackay who arrived at the old Port district along River Street.

The Bluewater Trail project has been very successful, gained significant recognition and received several awards:

- In 2010, it received national recognition, collecting two awards at the National Heart Foundation Local Government Awards. The Bluewater Trail was named the National overall winner and won its category (Planning for Active Living) at the Heart Foundation Local Government Awards.
- In 2010 and 2011, the trail was recognised in the Community Champions Award by the Queensland Spinal Injuries Association (QSIA). It was awarded for providing equitable and accessible facilities in the category of Best Recreation/Leisure Venue or Precinct.
- The Bluewater Trail has also gained considerable interest from other organisations and programs and has been used as an 'inspirational example' as part of the following two case studies in 2011:
1. 'Active Healthy Communities' – a resource package for local government to create supportive environments for physical activity and healthy eating coordinated by Queensland Government (Queensland Health) in partnership with the Heart Foundation and Local Government Association of Queensland Ltd (LGAQ).
2. 'Healthy Community / Healthy Workplace projects or initiatives' – case studies aiming to build the capacity of Queensland councils by raising awareness of the relevance, role and opportunities for creating healthy communities coordinated by Local Government Association of Queensland Ltd (LGAQ).
- In 2012 Mackay Regional Council Manager Recreation Services Mr Onno Van Es won the 2012 Local Government Association Queensland (LGAQ) Healthy Leaders Award (Senior Manager Category). "Onno was the visionary and leader behind two award winning council projects, the Bluewater Lagoon and the Bluewater Trail, that offer residents the chance to get outdoors and live a healthy lifestyle." He was recognised for "nurturing healthy partnerships across government jurisdictions and securing significant resources for healthy community infrastructure, shaping the environment through the creation of the award winning $30 million Bluewater Trail and $12.7 million Bluewater Lagoon projects and their activation through the delivery of healthy lifestyle programs."

=== Festival of Arts ===
The Mackay region is home to the Mackay Festival of Arts held annually throughout July. Now more than 20 years old, it is the largest regional arts festival in Queensland. The festival features wine and cheese tasting sessions, live jazz and other music, stand-up routines, art exhibitions, dance and other performances.

=== Artspace Mackay ===
Artspace Mackay, which opened in a new award-winning building designed by Cox Rayner Architects in February 2003, contains the Mackay Regional Council (MRC) Art Collection. This includes more than 1,200 artworks, and "one of the biggest holdings of artists' books in Australia outside of the capital cities".

=== City Centre ===
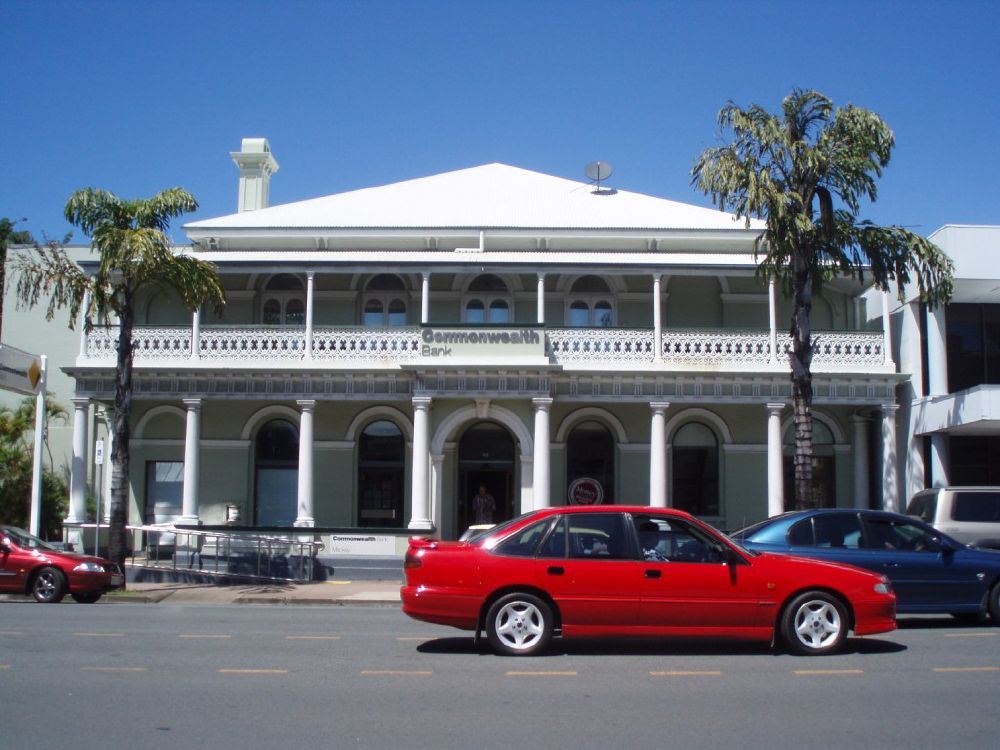
Commonwealth Bank

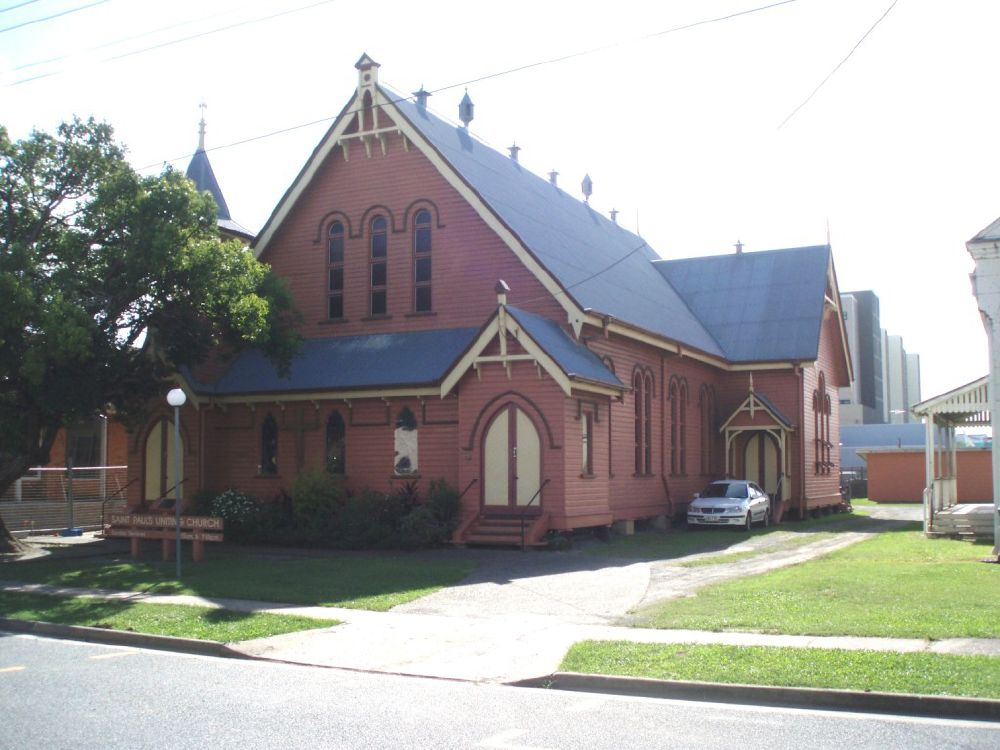
St. Paul's Uniting Church

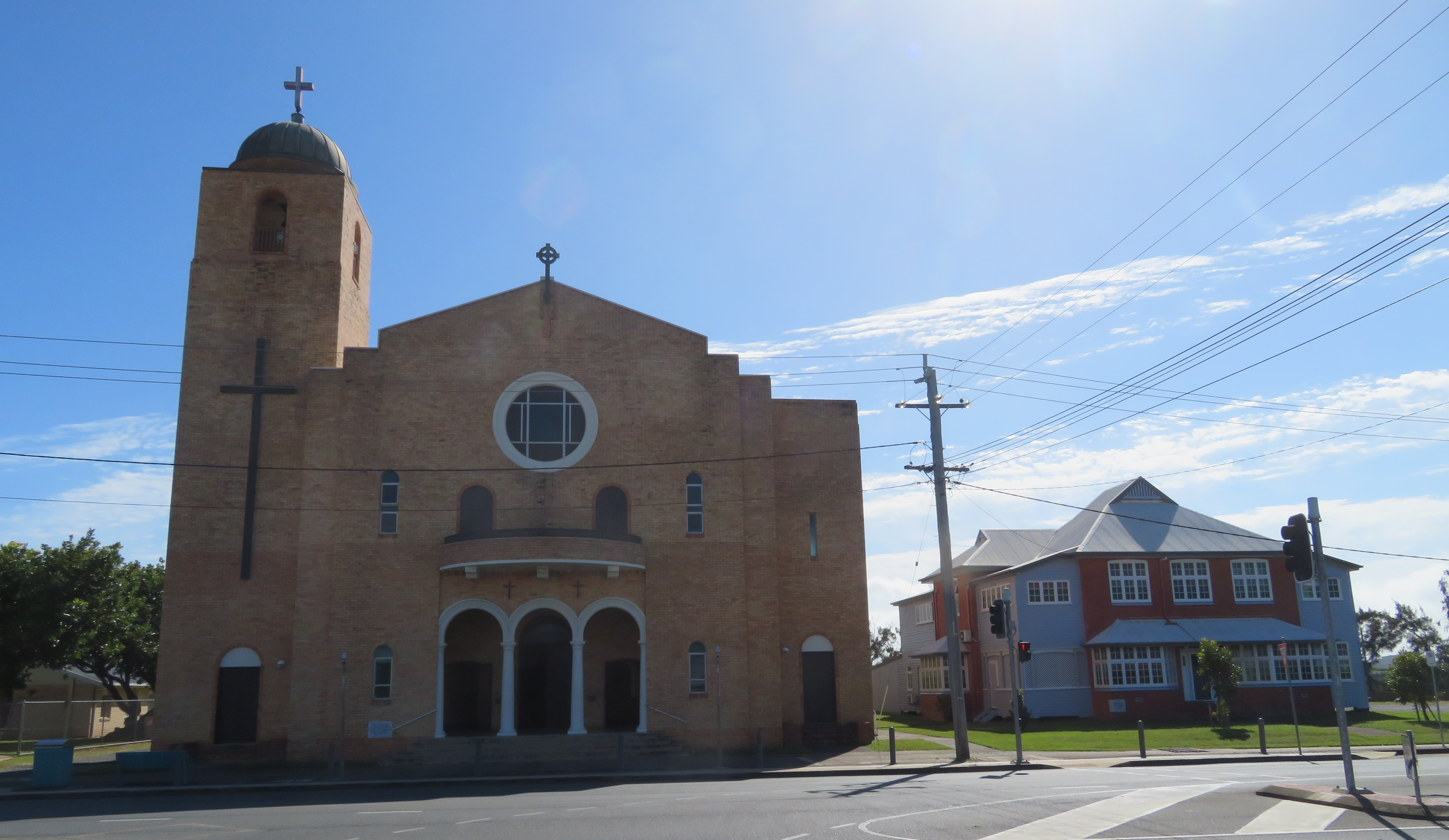
St. Patrick Church and its parsonage

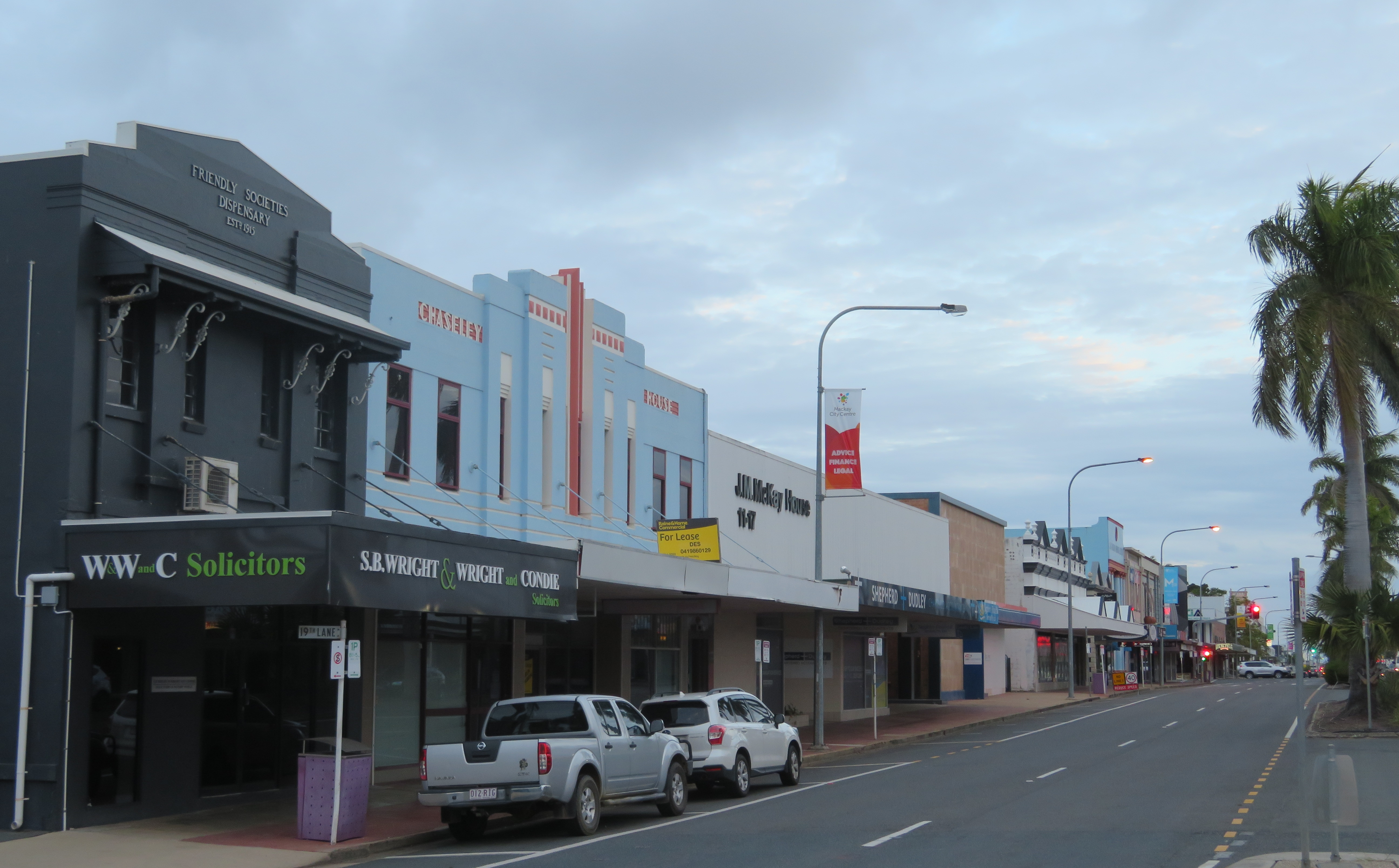
Chaseley House in Sydney Street

The City Centre is noted for its art-deco inspired architecture, with many buildings throughout the main streets of the central business district featuring distinctive designs from the early 20th century. Some of the most famous buildings are the former Main Post Office dating from 1940 with its clock tower, the Masonic Temple built in 1936, the Pioneer Shire Council built in 1935, Taylors Hotel (1936) and the Ambassador Hotel (1937). The Commonwealth Bank which was built as early as 1880 and the Old Court house dating from 1885 are two of the oldest buildings in town. The Technical College which was built 1911–12 is a part of the University. One of the most famous houses built in an art-deco style is Chaseley House in Sydney Street. The Town Hall dating from 1916 is one of the buildings which survived the cyclone of 1918 undamaged. St. Paul's Uniting Church which was completed in 1898 is the oldest church in town. One of the largest churches is St. Patrick's Church whose parsonage built in 1915 is one of the oldest residential buildings in Mackay. The precinct was upgraded in the 1990s through a unique community arts project. The overall theme depicts the environmental beauty of the Mackay region and consists of bronzed plaques, sculptures and terrazzo/mosaic tiles. Of particular interest is a sculptured free-form seat in the shape of a bommie, or bombora, and covered in myriad colours depicting the Great Barrier Reef through to the rainforests of Eungella National Park.

=== Mackay Marina Village ===
Mackay Marina Village is a coastal precinct located adjacent to the Mackay Harbour. The marina itself has nearly 500 berths.

=== Gateway to the Pioneer Valley ===
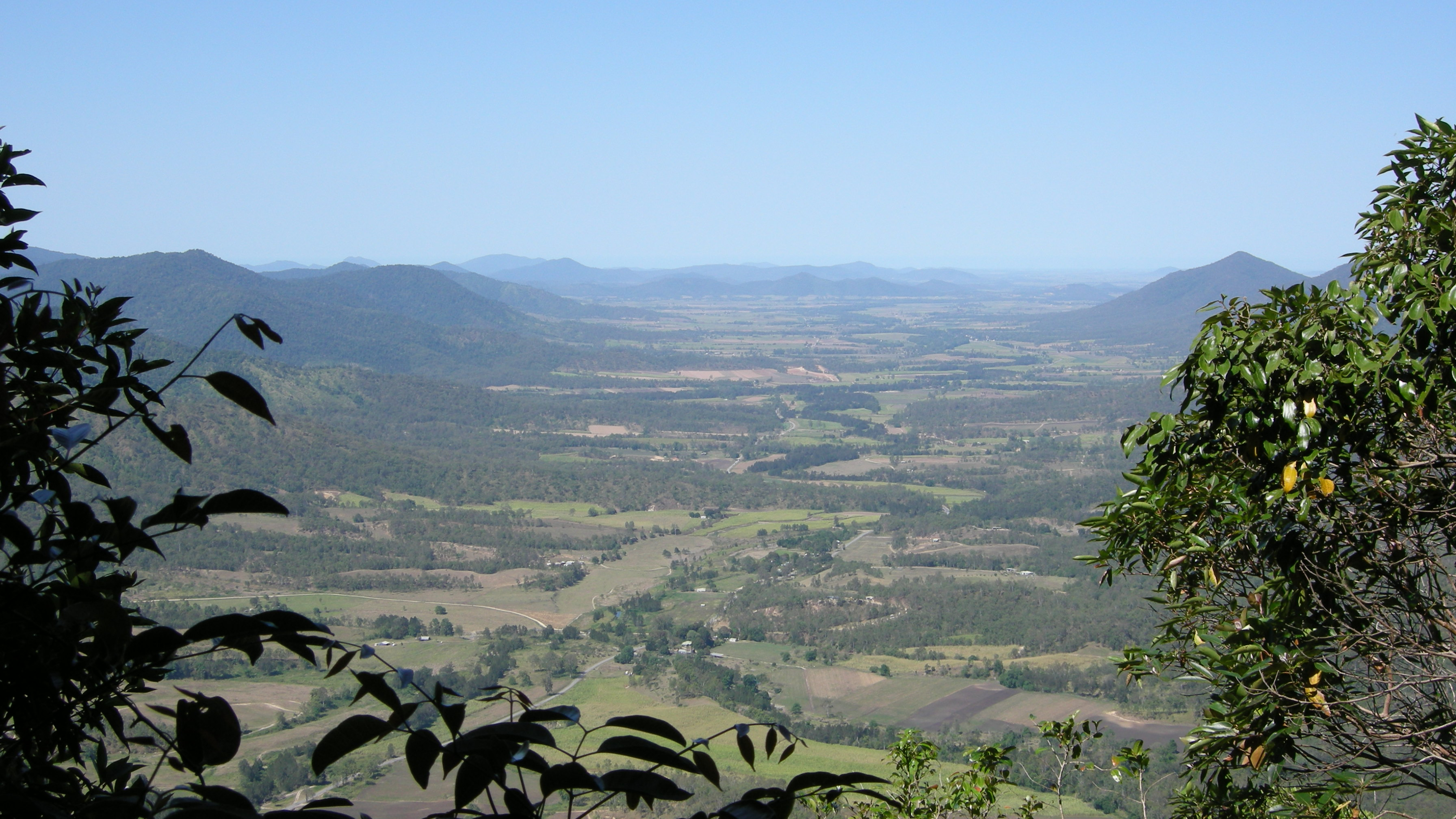
View from the Eungella 'Sky Window' looking east down the Pioneer Valley

Among the natural assets of the Pioneer Valley are the walking tracks and swimming holes of Finch Hatton Gorge. The Eungella National Park, located at the very top of the range, is the longest and oldest stretch of subtropical rainforest in Australia, covering more than 51,700 hectares. It is one of the few places where platypus can be seen swimming in the wild, while more than 225 species of bird have been recorded in the surrounding forests.

=== Islands and beaches ===
Mackay has 31 beaches within driving distance. Closest to the city are Illawong, Far and Town beaches. The patrolled Harbour Beach, adjacent to the Mackay Marina, is the most popular, being suitable for swimming. Lambert's Beach is also close to the city. Further north of the city are popular beaches at Bucasia, Dolphin Heads, Blacks Beach, Shoal Point and Eimeo – collectively these areas are known as the Northern Beaches. The Northern Beaches are popular with visitors, but are increasingly being developed as residential areas for Mackay's growing population.

=== River Sessions Festival ===
Held annually in June, River Sessions is Mackay and Central Queensland's premier youth and contemporary music festival. The festival features the best rock, hip-hop, alternative, folk, pop and dance music acts from around Australia.

== Transport ==
Two major highways, the A1 (Bruce Highway), and State Route 70 (Peak Downs Highway), pass through Mackay. The A1 connects the city to Townsville, Proserpine and Cairns in the north, and Rockhampton and Brisbane in the south. The Peak Downs Highway connects it to Moranbah, Clermont and Emerald in the south-west. In September 2020 the city was fully bypassed with users of the Bruce Highway able to use the new Mackay Ring Road to avoid the city.

The North Coast railway line meets the western line in the city's south. Trains from Brisbane pass through Mackay railway station and continue through to Proserpine, Townsville and Cairns, including the regular Spirit of Queensland service between Brisbane and Cairns. Minerals from the western line (Moranbah and other coal mining centres) are transported to Hay Point and Dalrymple Bay Coal Terminals for trans-shipment to other destinations. Mackay Harbour deals mainly with sugar exports and visiting cruise ships.

The city is served by Mackay Airport, from which QantasLink, Virgin Australia, and Jetstar offer flights to Brisbane and Melbourne, as well as to regional destinations such as Geelong, Cairns, Townsville, Rockhampton and Gladstone. MacAir Airlines previously provided a limited service into and out of Mackay for mining companies before it went into receivership in 2009.

Mackay Transit Coaches operates from North Mackay to South Mackay. The area with the best service coverage is Mackay's central business district.

== Health ==
The Mackay Base Hospital is at 475 Bridge Road in West Mackay, about 4 kilometres (2.5 mi) from the city centre.

The Mater Hospital, and the Mackay Specialist Day Hospital are in the city's north.

The Pioneer Valley Hospital, which had initially ceased operating, has been converted into an injury rehabilitation centre.

== Education ==
The Queensland Department of Education has 11 primary schools and 5 high schools in Mackay. The high schools are Pioneer State High School, Mackay State High School, Mackay North State High School, Mackay Northern Beaches State High School and Mirani State High School. One of the primary schools, Eungella State School was opened on 31 January 1928. Another, Mackay North State School, opened on 23 March 1915. The school celebrated its 100th anniversary in 2015.

The private system encompasses six and a half primary schools, Whitsunday Anglican School, two P–12 colleges, one P–10 college, Catherine McAuley College, a school currently at 7–10 but planning to expand to 7–12 by 2027, St. Patrick's College Mercy Campus, a 7–10 college, and St Patrick's College St. Patrick's Campus, which is the state's only 11–12 college.

The main Mackay campus of Central Queensland University is in the outer suburb of Ooralea with a second smaller campus in Sydney Street in the Mackay CBD. It is a dual sector University, offering both higher educational studies (diploma to doctorate levels) as well as vocational training and TAFE courses.

James Cook University provides clinical healthcare education at the Mackay Base Hospital and the Mater Private Hospital.

The Mackay Regional Council operates the Dudley Denny City Library at 134 Victoria Street, and the Gordon White Library in the outer suburb of Mount Pleasant.

== Government ==
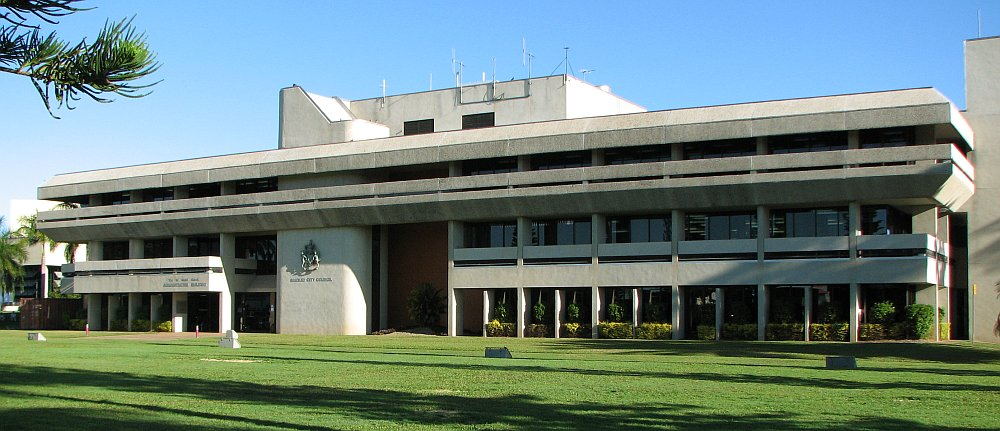
Mackay Regional Council Building, Gordon Street, Mackay

Mackay is governed locally by the Mackay Regional Council. The original Mackay City Council was formed in 1869. In 1994 the surrounding Pioneer Shire Council was amalgamated into the Mackay City Council. A further amalgamation in 2008 of the Sarina Shire Council and the Mirani Shire Council formed the present Mackay Regional Council The mayor is Greg Williamson. There are three State Government seats in the Mackay Regional Council footprint. Nigel Dalton is the member for the electoral district of Mackay, Glen Kelly represents Mirani and Amanda Camm represents Whitsunday. Andrew Willcox is the Federal Member for the Division of Dawson, which includes most of Mackay. Michelle Landry is the Federal Member for the Division of Capricornia which includes Sarina Mirani and some south Mackay suburbs.

== Sport ==
As with most Queensland cities and towns, Mackay's main sport is Rugby League. The Mackay Cutters compete in the Queensland Cup, having won the competition in 2013. Along with the Northern Pride and Townsville Blackhawks, the Cutters are affiliated with the National Rugby League's North Queensland Cowboys, with notable players playing for the Cutters including Jason Taumalolo, Reuben Cotter and Michael Morgan.

Mackay has a local Australian rules football league AFL Mackay and premiership AFLW matches are played at the Great Barrier Reef Arena.

In the 1920s the Olympic Theatre in Mackay was a popular venue for professional boxing and saw stars like Colin Bell and Tom Heeney fight there. Such teams in junior and senior are: Mackay City Hawks, Northern Beaches Magpies, Moranbah Bulldogs, Eastern Swans, Sarina Demons and Mackay Saints.

== Media ==
WIN Television (an affiliate of the Nine Network) previously produced a local WIN News bulletin for the area between April 2009 and May 2015. Southern Cross Nine aired a regional Queensland edition of Nine News from Brisbane, with local opt-outs for Mackay, from July 2017 to February 2019.

The only daily local newspaper in the city is the Daily Mercury. It is owned by News Corp. It ceased print editions in June 2020 and became online-only publication.

== Community groups ==
The Mackay branch of the Queensland Country Women's Association meets at the CWA Hall at 43 Gordon Street.

== People from Mackay ==
- Ashley Alberts, Rugby League player
- Drew Anthony, performing arts director/choreographer
- David Armitage, Australian rules footballer
- Tim Atkinson, Australian rugby union player
- Teneal Attard, Olympic field hockey player
- Ben Barba, Rugby League player
- Lauren Bella, Australian rules footballer
- Anthony Bennett, artist
- Todd Blanchfield, NBL player
- Sandy Brondello, Olympic basketballer
- Alayna Burns, racing cyclist
- Ram Chandra, snake showman and supported the development of antivenene
- Daly Cherry-Evans, Rugby League player
- Mark Christensen, Rugby League player
- Graeme Connors, country music singer/songwriter
- Brett Dallas, Rugby league player
- Delvene Delaney, model, TV presenter and actress
- Desmond Robert Dunn, author
- Kirstin Dwyer, Hockey player
- Cathy Freeman, Olympic sprinter
- Nick Frost, Olympic swimmer
- Declan Fraser, racing driver
- Shane Knuth, politician
- Dane Gagai, Rugby League player
- Jodi Gordon, TV actress and model
- Mick Gordon, video game composer and sound designer
- Tom Gorman, Rugby League player (1901–1978)
- Tia Gostelow, a musician
- Lloyd Graham, former Queensland Rugby Union player
- Josh Hoffman, Rugby League player
- Geoff Huegill, Olympic swimmer
- Karen Jacobsen, Entertainer; The original female Australian voice of the Siri application on Apple iPhones, iPods and iPads.
- Benita Johnson, Olympic distance runner
- Tristyn Kronk, BMX cyclist and coach
- Susan Lamb, former Federal Member for Longman in the Australian House of Representatives
- Linda Mackenzie, Olympic swimmer
- Melinda McLeod, world BMX champion
- Bob McTavish, surfboard designer
- George T. D. Moore, jockey and horse trainer
- Dane Nielson, Rugby League player
- Susie O'Neill, Olympic swimmer, born in Mackay
- Keith Payne, Victoria Cross recipient
- Emma Pittman, Australian rules football and soccer player
- Kalyn Ponga, Rugby League player
- Nicole Pratt, tennis player
- Jaxon Purdue, Rugby League player
- Grant Rovelli, Rugby League player
- Wendell Sailor, Rugby League Player
- Brett Seymour, Rugby League player
- William Forgan Smith, 24th Premier of Queensland
- Clint Steindl, NBL and Australian basketball player
- Grant Sullivan, cricketer
- Isaiah Tass, Rugby League player
- Gavin Urquhart, Australian rules footballer
- Jillian Whiting, former Seven and Nine news presenter
- Korah Halcomb Wills, former mayor of Mackay, kidnapper, butcher

== In popular culture ==
Mackay is mentioned in "Gladstone Pier", the song by Redgum from the 1984 album Frontline.

== Sister cities ==
Mackay has the following sister cities:

- Kailua Kona, Hawaii, United States since 4 January 1966
- Matsuura, Japan since 22 July 1989
- Honiara, Solomon Islands since 5 July 1995
- Yantai, China since 15 November 2012
