= Maryborough Base Hospital =

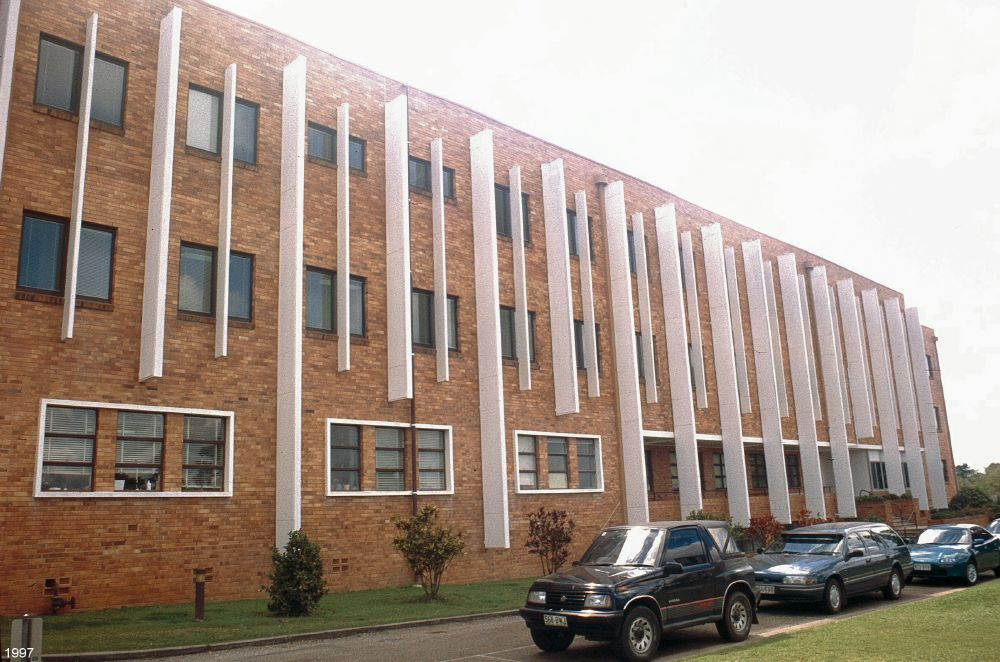
- "A" block seen from Walker Street, 1997

- Location within Queensland Location within Australia
- 25.5223°S 152.6902°E
- Location: Walker Street, Maryborough, Fraser Coast Region, Queensland, Australia

History
- Design period: 1870s–1890s (late 19th century)
- Built: 1887–1950

Site notes
- Architect: John James Clark

Queensland Heritage Register
- Official name: Maryborough Base Hospital, Maryborough General Hospital
- Type: state heritage (built)
- Designated: 2 February 1998
- Reference no.: 601907
- Significant period: 1887–1950 (fabric); 1887–ongoing (historical, social)
- Significant components: gate – entrance, office/administration building, kitchen/kitchen house, residential accommodation – nurses' quarters, bus shelter, morgue, ward – block, trees/plantings, store/s / storeroom / storehouse, residential accommodation – superintendent's house/quarters, theatre – operating, boiler room/boiler house, garden – bed/s, dining room, driveway, ambulance/first aid centre, residential accommodation – doctor's house/quarters
- Builders: Robert Taylor

Maryborough Base Hospital is a heritage-listed hospital at Walker Street, Maryborough, Fraser Coast Region, Queensland, Australia. It was designed by Queensland Colonial Architect John James Clark and built from 1887 by Robert Taylor. It is also known as Maryborough General Hospital. It was added to the Queensland Heritage Register on 2 February 1998.

== History ==
The current site of the Maryborough Hospital, which is the fourth hospital site, was established in 1887 when a complex of brick buildings was constructed to the design of Queensland Colonial Architect John James Clark. The hospital site has experienced many phases of development, most obviously in the late 1920s, the late 1930s and in the late 1940s and early 1950s. Many of the individual buildings, dating from both the nineteenth and twentieth centuries, are of cultural heritage significance.

The original township of Maryborough was situated, not in its current place, but on the north of the Mary River, after wharves were established in 1847–48 providing transport for wool from sheep stations on the Burnett River. In 1850 Surveyor, Hugh Roland Labatt arrived in Maryborough with instructions to "examine the River Mary...to suggest ...the best site or sites for the laying out of the town, having regard to the convenience of shipping on one hand and internal communication on the other...also...point out the spots desirable as reserves for public building, church, quay and for places for public recreation." The site recommended by Labatt was not where settlement was established but further east and from the early 1850s this is where the growing town developed.

In 1854 a hospital had been established in Maryborough in Fort Street, and prior to this the sick and invalided were treated at home by a few medical practitioners who lived in the town. By 1859 a Committee of Management had established another hospital, near the new centre of the town, at the corner of Ferry and Albert Streets, but was moved in 1863 to a site on the corner of Lennox and Walker Streets. In 1864 the hospital moved to its first purpose built building in Lennox Street, near the corner of Sussex Street. A substantial two storeyed brick building was constructed and a wing was added to this in 1865. In 1876 further additions were made to this site.

By the mid 1880s, the Lennox Street site was considered inadequate and another site on a large block in Walker Street on elevated ground on the western outskirts of the town was set aside for hospital use. This was officially reserved as a Hospital Reserve after the hospital was constructed, on 4 October 1888 and Henry Palmer, Henry Walker and William Southerden were appointed as trustees.

=== Centre Block and C-Block ===
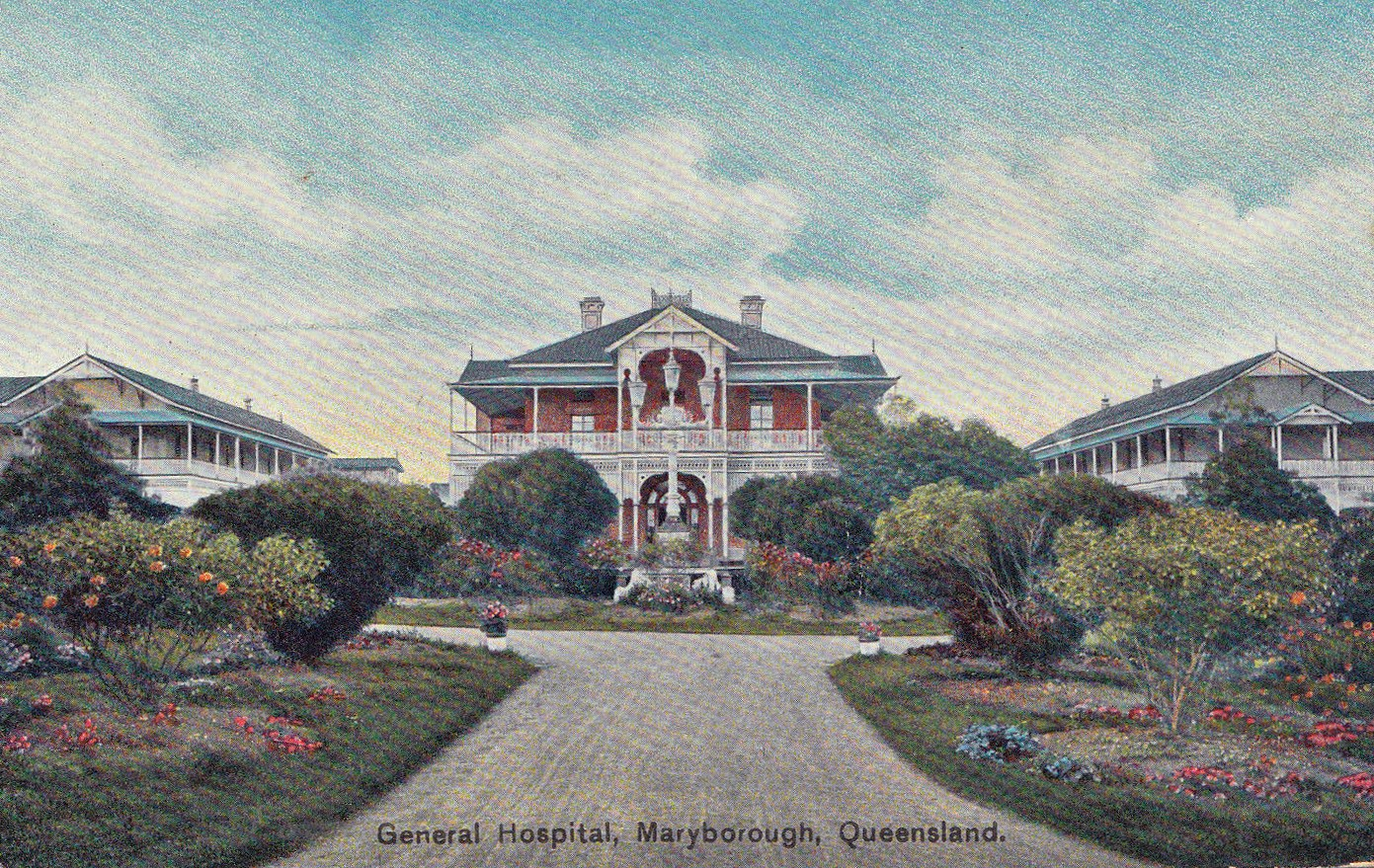
Maryborough Base Hospital, circa 1910

The first complex constructed on the new hospital site comprised three brick buildings, a central administrative core flanked by wards, as well as a separate medical superintendent's residence and a palisade fence with gates along Walker Street. These were designed by colonial architect JJ Clark and based on contemporary principles of hospital design about the pavilion plan.

For about eighty years, from the 1860s, all wards in hospitals built in Queensland were based on the principles of the pavilion plan which emerged as a development of hospital design in Europe in the 1850s. Pavilion planning was seen to overcome problems of good ventilation and sanitation. From the nineteenth century credence was given to the idea that disease was spread by foul air, according to miasmatic theory. The first pavilion plan was used in the design of the Lariboisière Hospital in Paris, which was a series of detached pavilions, where increased ventilation assisted patients in ridding themselves of their illness. This was a breakthrough in hospital design, because for the first time the building form was considered a crucial element of the healing process. By the 1870s and 1880s many pavilion plan type hospital wards were being constructed in major hospitals through Queensland.

Two of the nineteenth century buildings extant at the Maryborough Hospital, namely C-Block and Centre Block, are remnants of a pavilion planned hospital. The original 1887 complex comprised three buildings, a central administrative core flanked by two storeyed pavilion wards, those to the east for women and those to the west for men. Of these buildings only sections of the administrative core, Centre Block, and the men's wards, C Block, remain. The Centre Block housed offices and consulting rooms on the ground floor and residential quarters on the first floor.

Early photographs of the hospital showing these three buildings clearly manifest the ideals of pavilion planning; with three distinct and separated structures surrounded by verandahs. Of about eighty pavilion planned wards constructed in Queensland during the nineteenth century only six remain, three of these are at the Royal Brisbane Hospital, one at Isisford and one at Ipswich.

The foundation stone of the buildings was laid by the Queensland Premier, Sir Samuel Griffith on 15 April 1885, by which time much of the land had been cleared and trees planted. As well gates and fence rails were ordered from local founders, Walkers Ltd. The architect of the project John James Clark, was at that time the Colonial Architect a position he retained from 1883 until 1885. Though this was a limited period of employment Clark is a well regarded architect as the designer of many important Queensland buildings, includingthe Treasury Building in Brisbane; court houses in Mackay, Rockhampton, Warwick and Charters Towers as well as the Yungaba Immigration Depot in Brisbane. Clark designed many health related buildings throughout the state including hospitals at Charleville and Geraldton; additions to Townsville Hospital, the Baillie Henderson Hospital in Toowoomba, and the Lady Norman Wing at the Brisbane Children's Hospital.

The Maryborough Hospital buildings, comprising the hospital complex, residence and fence and gates, were opened on 20 May 1887. The total cost of the complex was about £16 000 to which substantial donations had been made by local benefactors and the Committee's General Fund with the remainder coming from the government. The contractor for the work was Robert Taylor. In the late 1880s a separate ward for Pacific Islanders was constructed on the Maryborough Hospital site.

The Hospitals Act (1923) introduced many changes to the practice of health care provision in Queensland, resulting in the state government providing more funding to hospitals, bringing about the current system of health care as a responsibility of the state. The Act allowed for the creation of districts, each with a hospital board responsible for fundraising and management issues. Shortfalls in funding were met by state and local governments.

In the decade following the introduction of the Act, the idea of the "modern hospital" emerged as a departure from the pavilion planned hospital. The modern hospital was focussed on cleanliness and efficiency influenced by the new germ theory of disease. These values were achieved within the framework provided by a new, modern architecture and characterised by multi levelled high rise structures incorporating new, building and health technology.

The Act of 1923 was amended in 1944 and, among other changes to the health care system, introduced the concept of base hospitals. Within each region of the state a base hospital was established to offer more specialised services than other hospitals in the region. It was in this way that the name of the Maryborough Hospital was changed to become the Maryborough Base Hospital. During the 1930s the Hospital Board appointed local architect, POE Hawkes to the position of Board Architect and he designed the buildings constructed in the 1938 redevelopment of the grounds. Much of the construction work designed by Hawkes was supervised by EH Boden.

=== Former Lady Musgrave Maternity Hospital ===
This was constructed in 1928 and took its name from an earlier maternity hospital constructed near the town centre to the design of local architect Samuel Bragg. Before the Maternity Act (1922) lying-in hospitals were run by charitable or religious institutes to provide services for women unable to pay for private pre-natal care. The institutions were named after the wife of the incumbent governor. The Act of 1922 changed the nature of maternity care in Queensland, providing free maternity hospitals and baby clinics throughout the state to engender an increase in population particularly in outback areas. Implementation began immediately and resulted in the construction of about 94 maternity hospitals or wards throughout the state before 1930.

As part of this program a maternity ward, the Lady Musgrave block was constructed in the grounds of the Maryborough Hospital. The building replaced an earlier 1888 lying-in hospital, from where the later buildings got their names. This 1888 building was constructed at the corner of John and North Streets in central Maryborough and was funded by a local fund raising committee. This earlier maternity hospital was opened on 8 November 1888.

The 1928 maternity ward, which replaced this earlier nineteenth century building, was a reinforced concrete building designed by prominent and innovative local architect POE Hawkes. Many of the state's maternity wards were constructed to a standard plan, based on pavilion planning principles with surrounding verandahs and all beds in the ward located near on operable opening. Attached to the rear of the wards by an open verandah or covered walk way was a septic ward. The plan of the Maryborough maternity ward was longer than the standard plan accommodating twenty five beds, nine private wards, matron's office, doctor's room, kitchenette, two labour wards, septic wards, sterilising room and matron's quarters. The building incorporated many features standard to 1920s maternity hospitals including a septic ward separated by verandahs. The Lady Musgrave Maternity Ward was opened on 24 November 1928 to co-incide with the opening of nurses' quarters.

On 31 July 1965, a new Lady Musgrave Maternity Ward was opened on land to the north of North Street, acquired by the hospital for the planning of this new wing. North Street was closed through the hospital grounds meaning that the 1928 maternity hospital, which was retained for future use as a disabled children's ward, no longer addressed a street, but faced the rear of the new maternity wing. Mr Douglas Tooth, the Minister for Health, opened the building which cost £250 000 and was designed by the Public Works Department.

=== The nurses' quarters ===
Two substantial two-storeyed buildings were constructed on the Maryborough hospital site as accommodation for nurses. The first, facing Walker Street, was constructed in 1928, but after only ten years was converted to private wards and another nurses' quarters was constructed facing Yaralla Street.

Following the introduction of the Hospital Nurses Award in 1921 basic rates were introduced for nursing staff stipulating wages, hours of work, and, importantly that all staff were entitled to free board and lodging in, if possible, separate rooms or suitable cubicles. The result of the award was the upgrading of accommodation for nurses and also an increase in the number of nurses employed at each hospital. Between 1924 and 1930, twenty six new nurses' quarters were constructed throughout Queensland.

The first nurses' quarters constructed at the Hospital, was a two storeyed reinforced concrete building providing accommodation for 78 nurses and domestic staff. The building was opened on 24 November 1928, along with the Lady Musgrave Maternity Hospital and both of the buildings were designed by Maryborough architect, POE Hawkes. This building served as a nurses' quarters for only ten years when a new nurses' quarters was constructed and the earlier building was converted to private wards.

When opened, the private wards were known as the Demaine Block, named after the incumbent Mayor of Maryborough, Mr William H Demaine who was also the chairman of the hospital board. The conversion of the building resulted in the opening of 35 private wards and to augment this an operating theatre and doctor's residence were constructed. The total building costs, including the construction of a new nurses' block, was £33 000 and the construction work was completed by Constructions Pty Ltd of Brisbane.

The 1938 nurses' quarters, constructed facing Yaralla Street were similar in design to the 1928 quarters, and was also designed by local architect, POE Hawkes, although it was supervised by another architect, EH Boden and he may have contributed to the final design. Provision was made for 100 bedrooms with an internal arrangement similar to the earlier buildings comprising central hallways from which the bedrooms were accessed, and front and rear verandahs to which nearly all of the internal rooms have access.

=== 20th-century residences ===
There are a number of twentieth-century residences on the Maryborough hospital site, including a two-storeyed building facing Walker Street, a brick duplex facing Yaralla Street, and a reinforced-concrete building at the corner of Walker and Yaralla Streets. Medical residence became popular during the inter-war period when various schemes were introduced to house medical officers on site.

During the first 1928 phase of development, a doctor's house was constructed at the corner of Walker and Yaralla Streets. Designed by Philip Oliver Ellard Hawkes, this building is of reinforced concrete and has wide surrounding timber-framed verandahs. This building was intended to replace a nineteenth-century residence which was partially demolished as a result of the nearby construction of the first nurses' quarters, now the Demaine Block. The new residence was constructed for under £2000 after the board asked the Public Works Department to revise their scheme, which was to cost considerably more. An inspection of the early plan of the building indicates that the building was carefully designed to ensure passive temperature control. It now houses the Wide Bay Hospitals Museum.

After ten years, in 1938 another doctor's residence was constructed on Walker Street, also to the design of local architect, POE Hawkes. Also a reinforced-concrete building, this was designed to be an imposing feature and is vaguely Mediterranean in its design inspiration, with an arcaded loggia of three smooth-faced arched openings forming a central entrance porch to the building. The living quarters were on the ground floor, and the sleeping accommodation is above. A newspaper reports that the external walls were to be finished in the "traventene style, whilst white plaster boards are being used on the inner walls and ceilings."

In 1950 another residence was constructed, facing Yaralla Street and designed by architects, Prangley and Tesch. The building was designed as a symmetrically arranged one-storeyed duplex as quarters for medical staff.

=== Other buildings ===
During the first major redevelopment of the hospital, when the new Lady Musgrave hospital and the first nurses' quarters were constructed in 1928, other new buildings on the site included a mortuary, also designed by POE Hawkes, which is used as such to this day. This is a small reinforced-concrete building rendered with roughcast stucco. At the time of the development the curator of the Gardens, Mr Fred Lawrence, was engaged to lay out the grounds.

The next phases of development, opened in 1938, resulted in the construction of a dedicated operating theatre, which was until this stage, housed in various other buildings on the site. The operating theatre was designed by POE Hawkes and is obviously influenced by Spanish Mission architecture which was a popular inter-war architectural style. The building was constructed adjacent to the western side of the newly opened Demaine Block. The design of the operating theatre was described in the local newspaper at the time of opening "as the most up to date in Australia" and influenced by a "famous hospital in Berlin". A lengthy report of the innovative fittings and finishes follows and this describes many features which are standard in operating theatres of today. The operating theatre was extended in the 1950s and again in the 1970s and was converted for use as a store when the new major blocks were constructed.

In 1950 a dining room, designed by Brisbane architects, Donoghue, Cusick and Edwards was constructed and this was a single storeyed timber building elevated on stumps. The building is now used as a School of Nursing. In conjunction with the construction of the dining room the same architects designed a brick kitchen constructed by the Queensland Building and Engineering Company. In November 1997 these buildings were substantially intact.

In the year following, 1951, an ambulance station was constructed on the Maryborough Hospital site. This was built facing Neptune Street for a cost of £7500 and housed four ambulance station bays and ancillary room. This is now used as an engineers' workshop.

In 1953 the first section of what is now the largest building on the site was constructed. Always intended to be extended, this section of the building formed the ground floor level of what is now B block, on the corner of Walker and Neptune Streets. An official opening of the building was held on 14 November 1953 by the Minister for Health and Home Affairs, Mr WM Moore, which was intended as the outpatients and administrative wing of the hospital. Cabinet had decided on a building programme for the site and approval was given in June 1948 for the acceptance of a tender from Queensland Building and Engineering Co for £89,945/10/-, although the cost of the buildings was £143,000 and the construction of a dining room and kitchen was the first part of this building programme. The building was extended in 1977 and opened by Dr Llewellyn Edwards on 23 April 1877 and again extended in 1987.

== Description ==
The Maryborough Hospital site is located to the west of the town centre on a large site bordered by Walker, Neptune and Yaralla Streets and Winston Noble Drive. The site was originally bisected by a continuation of North Street, parallel to Walker Street, but this was closed to traffic in the 1960s.

The site comprises a large number of buildings of varying ages and this description will list them in chronological order. There is little overall planning of the site evident, although individual buildings are surrounded by landscaped areas which address street frontage and provide context. There are a large number of significant trees on the site, as well as circular entrance drives, bedding and other landscape features which are important to the site. A small timber framed bus shelter with hipped roof is on the Walker Street boundary of the property, adjacent to the original entrance gates.

=== 1887 former Ward and Centre Block (now C Block and Centre Block) ===
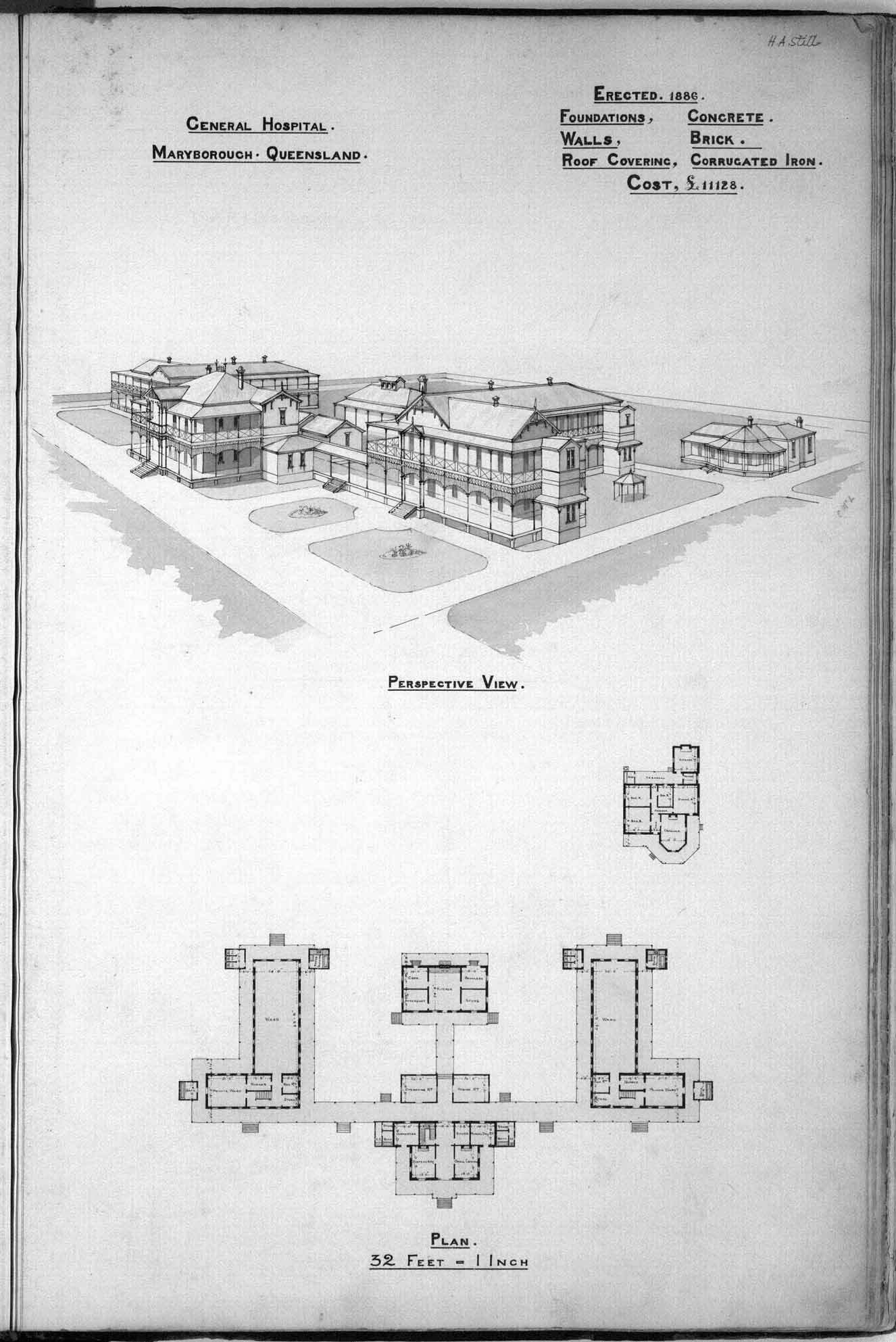
Architectural Plan of the Maryborough Base Hospital, 1888

Two of the three nineteenth-century buildings on the site, C Block and Centre Block. are now substantially disguised by later accretions, although many of these additions could be removed to reveal the form of the original buildings. The buildings, which are now linked to one another by a covered walkway, were two storeyed brick structures surrounded by open verandahs.

C Block, one of the original ward blocks, is not immediately recognisable as a nineteenth-century building, as the two storeyed verandahs surrounding the building have been infilled with a c. 1960s brick envelope through which aluminium framed openings are punched. The complex hipped roof of the original structure is evident above these verandahs and this retains an early corrugated iron cladding.

Internally the building has been renovated but retains many interesting features including an early stair hall and an open ward on the first floor. This ward, which has plaster rendered walls and a raked timber boarded ceiling, is an example of nineteenth-century pavilion planning.

Centre Block, like C Block is a two storeyed face brick building, with most of its verandahs infilled. The original corrugated iron clad pyramidal roof and verandah awnings are evident. Internally the building retains an early ground floor layout, with several rooms featuring nineteenth century timber joinery, fireplaces and openings. The early entrance to this block is a large double timber and glazed door surmounted by a round arched fanlight and all surrounded with aligned glazed openings and although some of the glazing has been replaced, this doorway survives substantially intact.

=== 1887 former Residence (now Information Technology Building) ===
When the original nurses' quarters were constructed in 1928 the original doctor's residence was partially demolished. However, what remains of this single storeyed brick building is legible as a nineteenth-century residence. The building is raised on concrete stumps and foundations and is surrounded at the eastern end by a timber framed verandah which follows the apsidal plan form of this end of the building. The complex hipped roof is clad with corrugated iron. The building has original openings and joinery.

=== 1887 gateway ===
Located in a central position on the Walker street boundary of the hospital site are four substantial rendered masonry gate posts with cast-iron palisade gate. The central two gate posts are larger than the flanking posts and all feature steeply pitched double gabled cap. The faces of the central posts have trefoiled lancet-type recesses and this motif is repeated on the smaller posts with circular recesses housing trefoils. The corner edges of the posts are chamfered and the posts have enlarged bases.

=== 1928 nurses' quarters (now Demaine Block) ===
The Demaine Block is prominently sited, facing Walker Street and between the street boundary and the building has a large circular drive around a small traffic island planted with an established poinciana tree. The symmetrically arranged building is a large two storeyed reinforced concrete structure comprising a long central wing, parallel to Walker Street, flanked by transverse wings. Lining the front and the rear of the block are two storeyed timber framed verandahs. The verandahs are housed under the corrugated iron clad hipped roof of the building and have a vertical timber battened balustrade. A centrally located simple concrete stair with timber balustrade provides access to the ground floor level of the building. Other, more recent stairs have been added to the internal corners of the building, although a straight timber stair survives on the rear elevation. The entrance stair sits within a projection on the front facade of the building and this is reflected by a large gabled projection in the roof. Although some openings remain, many of the original openings have been infilled and replaced. The building has been internally refurbished although the original floorplan survives in sections.

=== 1928 former Lady Musgrave Maternity Ward ===
This building which is now in the middle of the hospital site, originally faced the extension of North Street which was closed in the 1960s. The original maternity ward is a long one storeyed reinforced concrete building surrounded by an infilled timber framed verandah. The corrugated iron clad hipped roof extends over the early verandahs space, making it quite steeply pitched. Three small projections from the south eastern facade which would originally have been the rear elevation, house individual rooms and these are roofed with hipped projections from the principal roof. Adjoining the building at the western end is a small separately hipped roofed building. The other end of the former maternity ward is linked by a short semi enclosed walkway to a separate hipped roof structure. This small reinforced concrete structure, which was always intended as part of the larger maternity complex, is also surrounded by infilled verandahs, and the interior is substantially intact, with original internal partitioning, openings, ceilings and other joinery.

=== 1928 morgue ===
This small one storeyed reinforced concrete building is still in use as the hospital morgue. The building contains two adjoining sections, forming a T-shaped plan, with corrugated iron hipped roof and a centrally located roof ventilator. The building is rendered with rough cast stucco and, originally on the now closed North Street boundary of the site, is centrally located east of the maternity wing. The building comprises a viewing room, mortuary, post-mortem room and small waiting room.

=== 1928 medical superintendent's residence ===
This one storeyed reinforced concrete building has timber framed verandahs and external timber cladding on some sections. The residence is diagonally sited to address the corner of Walker and Yaralla Streets. The hipped roof of the building is clad with corrugated iron sheeting. When completed the building comprised three bedrooms, drawing room, dining room, study, kitchen, laundry and maid's room and remains substantially intact.

=== 1938 nurses' quarters ===
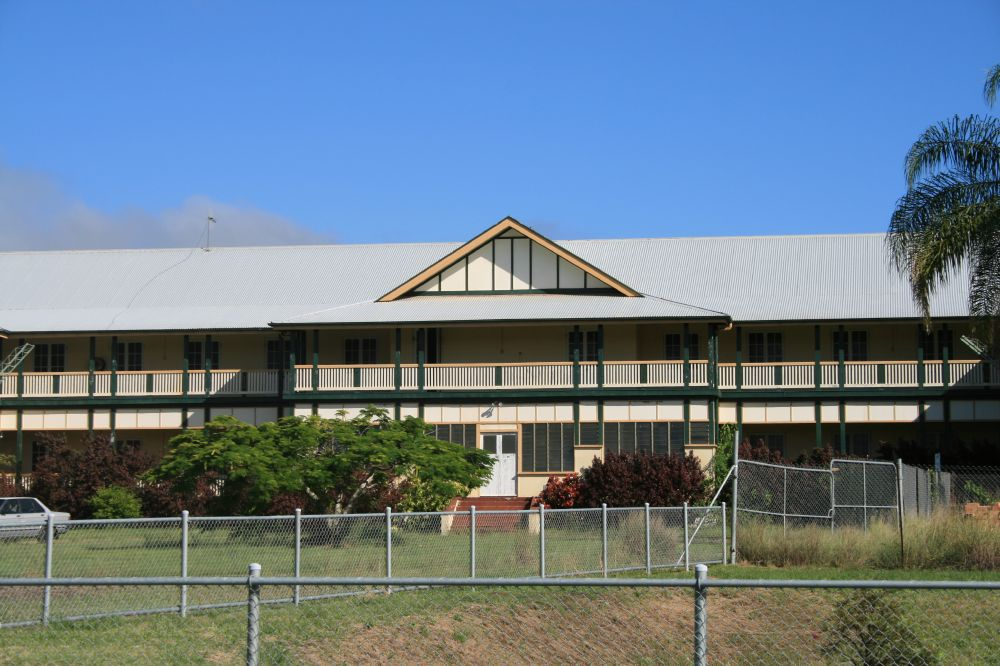
1938 Nurses quarters, seen from Yaralla Street, 2009

This building, which faces Yaralla Street, is similar to the original nurses' quarters, now known as the Demaine Block and is a two storeyed reinforced concrete building. Like the Demaine Block, the nurses' quarters has a large circular drive between it and the street. The building comprises a long central bay, parallel to Yaralla Street and flanked at the two ends by transverse bays which project both into the front and rear elevations, resulting in an H-shaped plan. The building has a hipped roof which extends to provide cover for the two-storeyed verandahs which line the front and rear elevations of the building. The timber-framed verandahs have similarly detailed balustrade and frieze panelling to that found on the Demaine Block. Likewise a similar centrally projecting section, houses the entrance and is reflected on the roof with a large gabled projection. The ground floor of this projection is lined with heavy rendered masonry, half and three quarter height, piers and this face has now been infilled with glazed louvres. The building is substantially intact with original openings, joinery, floorplan and entrances.

At the rear of the building is an iron framed and corrugated iron clad structure with a gabled roof and lined with timber framed window openings. This is thought to have been constructed for military purposes during World War Two.

=== 1938 former residence now staff quarters ===
This residence is an imposing two storeyed, rough cast rendered, brick building facing Walker Street. The building has a rectangular plan and corrugated iron clad hipped roof. The building has a centrally located, one storeyed arcaded projection from the front facade, which is formed by three arched openings forming an entrance loggia. Flanking this are two square headed openings, which also line the two stories of the other facades. A two storeyed rear verandah has been enclosed with fibrous cement sheeting and glazing. The building is substantially intact with few internal alterations.

=== 1938 former operating theatre (now CSSD) ===
This is a one storeyed rough cast rendered brick building, centrally located on the site adjacent to the western side of the Demaine Block and behind A Block. This building has a corrugated iron clad hipped roof with a central projecting gable on the former front elevation, which is clad with a decorative Spanish Mission inspired parapeted gable element extending the full height of the building. The building features a number of large, steel framed window opening, comprising a number of hinged operable glazing panels.

=== 1950 former Dining room (now School of Nursing) ===
This is a simple rectangular planned timber framed and clad building with hipped corrugated iron roof. The building is slightly elevated from the ground on timber stumps with timber framed hinged windows lining each of the elevations. Adjoining the two shorter ends of the buildings are shorter hipped roof projections. The building is substantially intact.

=== 1950 kitchen ===
This is a single storeyed brick building lined with iron framed window openings. The building has a rectangular floor plan and a gabled roof. Various brick additions have been made to this structure. The main food preparation area is at the western end of the building and a staff dining room is at the eastern end. This building has a large internal space divided by a concrete partition and remains substantially intact.

=== 1950 residence ===
This duplex residence, facing Yaralla Street, is constructed from polychrome brick. The building is symmetrically composed and has a hipped roof clad with ceramic tiles. The Yaralla Street elevation of the building has a central projection which is hipped roofed and features a line of six openings filled with timber framed hopper windows, which are aligned with six oversized ventilation openings at ground level. Flanking the windows are two iron grilled openings.

=== 1951 former ambulance (now engineers' workshop) ===
This is an interesting one storeyed partially rendered brick building facing Neptune Street, whose skillion roof is concealed by a rendered parapet. At the northern corner of the Neptune Street facade is a large square planned brick tower which has parallel vertical rendered brick fin elements and a rendered parapet and projecting brick quoining at the corners. A narrow cantilevered awning surrounds the building. Four large full length openings, originally used as ambulance vehicle bays give access to the building from Neptune Street.

=== Other structures on the site ===
A and B Blocks are large three and four storeyed brick buildings which dominate the site and are situated along the Walker Street boundary. The buildings comprise a number of variously aged additions but are characterised by flat face brick facades with horizontal strip openings and narrow vertical and horizontal fins used as sunshading devices.

The 1965 maternity block is located at the northern, rear end of the site. The one storeyed brick building is diagonally sited and has an L-shaped plan. The longer section of the L houses wards which have access to front and rear concrete framed verandahs. The building has a number of concrete surrounded window openings and a quite flat skillioned roof.

The pathology lab is a one storeyed L-shaped planned brick building centrally located on the site near the 1950 timber kitchen. A large two storeyed brick boiler is located on the Neptune Street elevation of the site. It has a dramatic steeply pitched skillion roof and horizontal strip openings and external concrete framing.

== Heritage listing ==
Maryborough Base Hospital was listed on the Queensland Heritage Register on 2 February 1998 having satisfied the following criteria.

The place is important in demonstrating the evolution or pattern of Queensland's history.

The site demonstrates the growth of Maryborough from a small settlement to a large provincial town in the latter part of the nineteenth century and through the twentieth century.

The place demonstrates rare, uncommon or endangered aspects of Queensland's cultural heritage.

The Maryborough Hospital is exceptional and rare in demonstrating the development of hospital sites in Queensland from the nineteenth century through the twentieth century. The site retains buildings from all periods of its development and many of these buildings are substantially intact. Centre block, C Block and the 1887 medical superintendent's residence are rare surviving hospital buildings from the nineteenth century. C Block is a rare surviving example of a pavilion planned ward in Queensland, an extensive number of such hospital wards were constructed but few have survived twentieth century development.

The place has potential to yield information that will contribute to an understanding of Queensland's history.

The site is important for its potential to reveal further information about the planning and development of hospitals dating from the nineteenth century.

The place is important in demonstrating the principal characteristics of a particular class of cultural places.

Maryborough Hospital demonstrates the principal characteristics of a Queensland hospital, on a large site on elevated ground away from the town centre. Individual buildings on the site are also able to demonstrate characteristics of hospital buildings, including nineteenth century pavilion ward planning; nurses quarters from the late 1920s and the late 1930s; maternity ward from 1928, several hospital residences and quarters; an ambulance station and morgue.

The place is important because of its aesthetic significance.

The site has aesthetic significance as a prominent Maryborough landmark. Individual buildings on the site have architectural merit as well composed buildings with significant streetscape and landmark qualities, including the remnants of the nineteenth century buildings, the two nurses quarters, ambulance station, former 1929 maternity hospital, single storeyed residence on the corner of Yaralla and Walker Streets and two storeyed residence on Walker Street. Other elements on the site contribute to aesthetic and historical significance of the site including the morgue, duplex on Yaralla Street, dining room, established trees and bed plantings and the bus shelter.

The place has a strong or special association with a particular community or cultural group for social, cultural or spiritual reasons.

The site is important to the Maryborough community as their principal site of public health care for about 110 years.

The place has a special association with the life or work of a particular person, group or organisation of importance in Queensland's history.

The site is associated with many early prominent Maryborough citizens who were instrumental in establishing the site and with architects John James Clark and POE Hawkes who designed many of the buildings.

== Notable people ==
- Ellen Barron: head nurse, General Hospital, 1902–1904; matron, Lady Musgrave Hospital, 1906–1908.
- Barbara Carson who led the Royal Australian Nursing Federation (Victorian Branch) to their first strike in 1985 worked here.
