= Mackay Court House and Police Station =

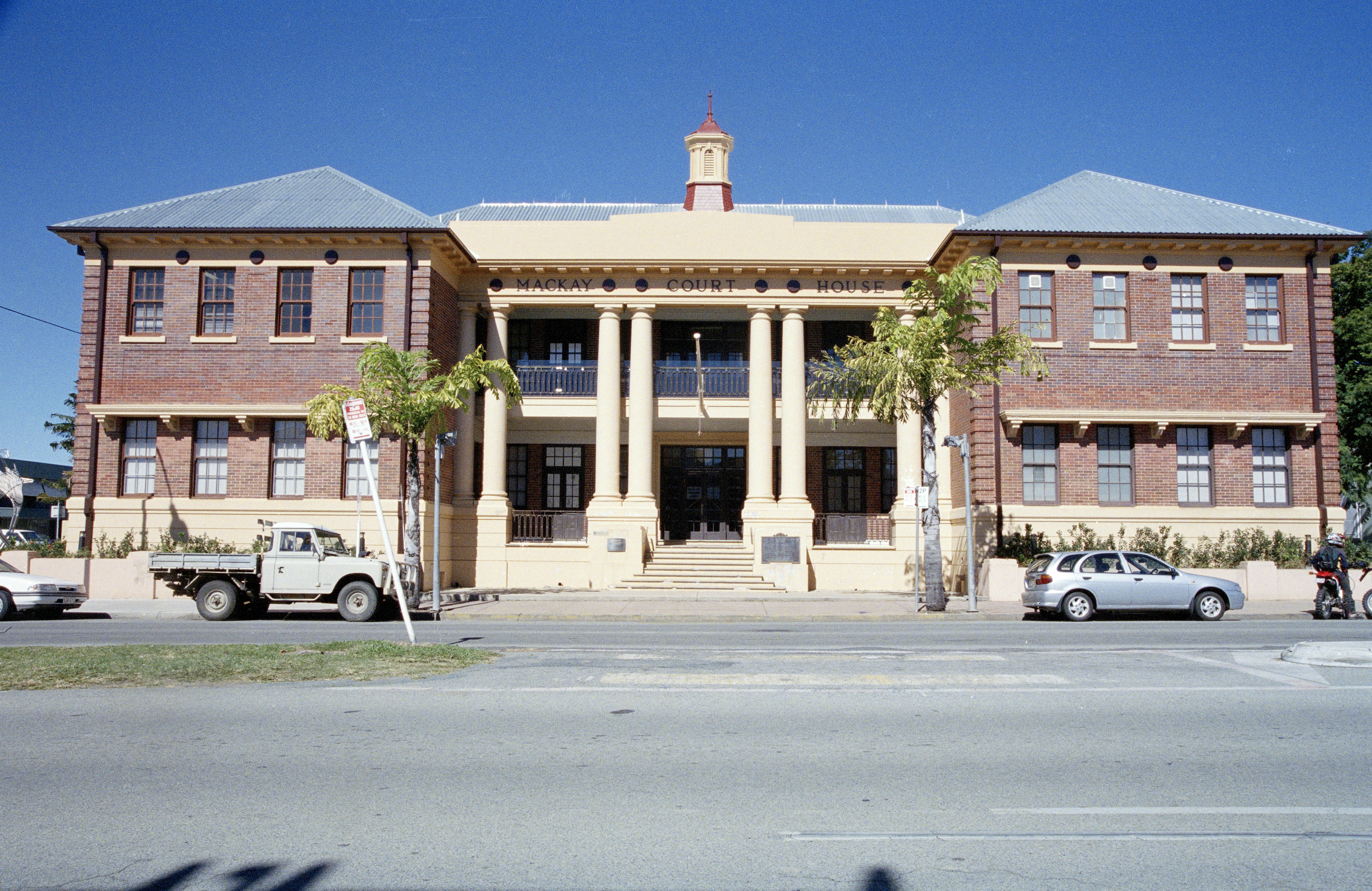
- Mackay Court House, 2005

- Location within Queensland Location within Australia
- 21.1421°S 149.1877°E
- Location: 67 Victoria Street and 14 Brisbane Street, Mackay, Mackay Region, Queensland, Australia

History
- Design period: 1870s–1890s (late 19th century)
- Built: 1886–1963

Queensland Heritage Register
- Official name: Mackay Court House and Police Station, Mackay Court House
- Type: state heritage (built)
- Designated: 21 October 1992
- Reference no.: 600673
- Significant period: 1880s, 1930s (historical); 1880s–1890s (fabric police station); 1930s (fabric court house)
- Significant components: court house, police station, residential accommodation – police sergeant's house/quarters, watch house

Mackay Court House and Police Station is a heritage-listed courthouse and police station at 67 Victoria Street and (on the same block) 14 Brisbane Street, Mackay, Mackay Region, Queensland, Australia. They were built from 1886 to 1963. It is also known as Mackay Court House and Mackay Police Station. It was added to the Queensland Heritage Register on 21 October 1992.

== History ==
The site has been associated with the police and judiciary in Mackay since the 1860s. Although buildings were erected and removed during the 19th and 20th centuries as the site developed, the major buildings remain and include the police station, built as a court house in 1886, the current court house, built in 1938, and two brick police residences from 1936 to 1937. A 1960s watch house and keeper's residence are also on this site.

The town of Mackay is named for John Mackay who entered the valley of the Pioneer River in 1860 and established a pastoral run there in the following year. In 1862 a settlement was begun on the south bank of the river and by 1863, the township had been surveyed and the first lots of land sold. It was gazetted as a port of entry and a customs house was opened. The town prospered as a port and as a commercial and administrative centre, drawing business from nearby pastoral holdings and the sugar cane plantations being developed along the river. There were 2 police constables in Mackay by late 1863.

1864 was the year in which a centralised police force under a Commissioner was inaugurated by Act of Parliament. It replaced a system of police districts where constables were under the direction of local magistrates and marked the beginning of a modern police force in Queensland. The government faced the problem of policing a huge area with a scattered population on a limited budget. Transport also posed problems, especially before the development of reliable roads and a railway network. The situation was addressed by instituting a system of regional courts served by visiting magistrates or judges and which had police offices, accommodation and lock-up facilities on the same site. The first report of the Commissioner of Police in 1865 recommended cutting costs and improving efficiency by combining police and judiciary functions in the same building. Because police travelled on horseback, the provision of stables and a paddock for police horses was necessary, so that police reserves for all these purposes were gazetted in major towns.

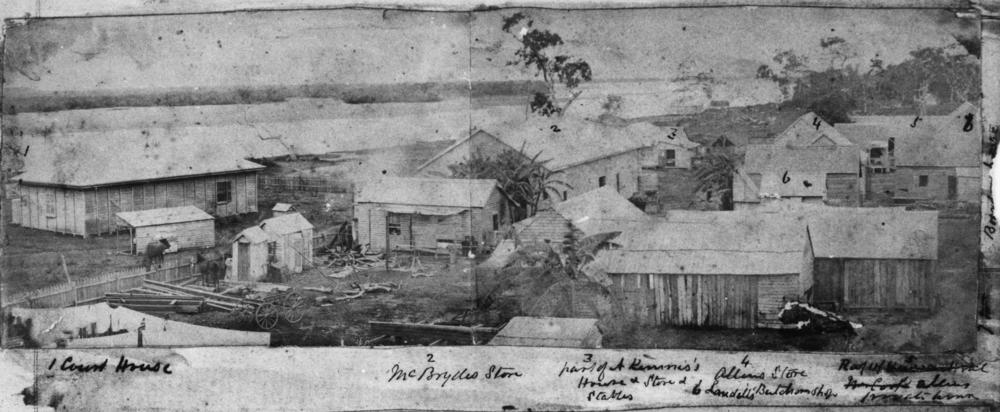
Business district of Mackay, 1868 (the court house is the low timber building on the far left)

A police watch house was built in Mackay in 1865 at the northern end of the current site and a Police Magistrate was appointed to serve the district. In 1872 a simple timber courthouse with a shingled roof was constructed. It was built near the Customs House rather than the police facilities and was inadequate from the beginning. A new courthouse was built in 1873 to the south of the lock-up and was soon extended, reflecting the speed with which the area was developing. A police station was constructed in 1878–1879 comprising cells and barracks.

The 1880s saw an expansion in police numbers and in court cases as the Queensland economy enjoyed a boom and people poured into the colony. Police numbers were expanded and police and judiciary facilities constructed at such a pace that it became difficult to obtain suitably qualified contractors. The sugar industry was also booming and Mackay was amongst those regional centres where substantial new court houses were erected. In 1884 contracts for a new court house were prepared following the construction of new police stables and lock-up keeper's quarters.

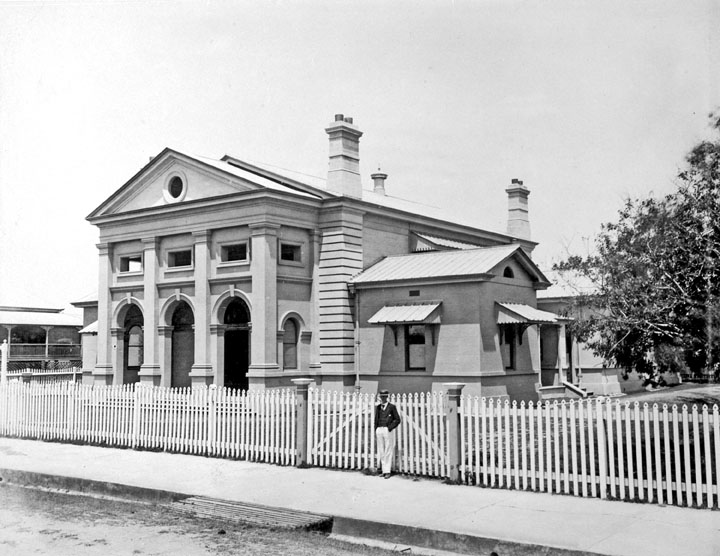
Court House (now Police Station), Mackay, c 1890

The new court house was designed by noted architect John James Clark, who was at the time Queensland Colonial Architect. Clark was born and trained in Liverpool, England. He arrived in Melbourne in 1853 and won a number of architectural competitions, his success in such competitions being a feature of his career. He designed some major public buildings in Melbourne, including the Treasury. He moved to Sydney in 1881 and in 1883 had become Queensland Colonial Architect. Although he left the position in 1885, he was responsible for some important public buildings including courthouses at Charters Towers, Rockhampton and Warwick. They and the Mackay court house were designed in the classical revival style thought appropriate for public buildings intended to convey a sense of stability and dignity, particularly a court house which represented the power of the law. The contractor for the work was Denis Kelleher and the cost on completion, including a strong room and furniture, was £4499/8/7. The court house was a single storey building with rooms extended to each side of the front entrance containing barristers and witnesses' rooms and which were later extended by one room on each side. Behind the bench were rooms for the judge, police magistrates, Clerk of Petty Sessions and Jury. It was opened on 27 May 1886 and the first local sitting of the Supreme Court was held on 15 June 1886.

A new gaol at North Mackay was completed in 1888 and facilities at the police complex and court complex improved with quarters for the police sergeant proposed in 1889 and police quarters in 1896.

Although suffering a devastating cyclone in 1918, Mackay enjoyed a period of substantial growth through the 1920s and 1930s. It was the fastest growing town in Queensland, its population doubling between 1920 and 1940. This was largely because its connection to the railway system in 1924 improved access to markets and reduced transport costs, thus boosting not only the sugar industry but the developing dairy and tourist industries. The growth of the region was supported by local Member and Premier of Queensland William Forgan Smith and important improvements were made to the infrastructure of the town and harbour. Although Mackay enjoyed prosperity, the country as a whole endured widespread unemployment during the Depression years and extensive public works programs were put in place to alleviate this.

New police residences were designed in 1935. The inspector's residence was built in 1936 and the watch house keeper's quarters in 1937, the difference in designation a subtle reflection of rank, although the buildings are very similar. They are unusual in that they are constructed of brick, although this may have been connected with the availability of good local bricks. They have the short passage and asymmetrical room plan typical of 1930s houses in the south, but which was modern for Mackay where many houses of a similar size were still built with central passage layouts. The residences are of a better quality than comparable police residences in other regional centres and represent a dramatic improvement from early police accommodation which was often cramped and inadequate. The size and quality of these ancillary buildings reflects not only the prestige accorded to these officers, but the prosperity of Mackay and the importance of its court and police station to the region.

The next phase of the upgrading of the police and judicial complex was the construction of a large and handsome court house to replace the 19th-century court house which had long been inadequate. At the time Andrew Baxter Leven was Queensland Government Architect. Leven was trained in Scotland and arrived in Queensland in 1911, working in Queensland and in New South Wales until 1914 when he became a draughtsman in the Public Works Department. By 1923 he was Assistant Architect and Chief Architect between 1933 and 1951. For 22 years he was the government representative on the Board of Architects, being Chairman for the last ten years. His office was responsible for the design of a number of public buildings in the Georgian Revival style. The Mackay Court House is amongst the grandest of these buildings with handsome internal detailing including panelled offices. The Court was also designed to accommodate other important government functions such as the office of the Lands Commissioner. The foundation stone was laid on 31 March 1938 by Premier Forgan Smith. The new court house addressed Victoria Street where the first police lock-up had been and thus provided the main street with an imposing public building.

The old court house became a police station after the court moved to its new premises effecting a reversal of zones of usage across the complex. It underwent additions and modifications for this purpose in 1940–1941, which extended the rear and created an upper level to part of the building to provide accommodation and a recreation room.

Plans were drawn in 1961 for a new cell block and facilities by Architect in Association Colin Tesch and the new watch house was constructed in 1962–1963 at a cost of £35,140. It is designed in the International Modernist style developed in Europe about twenty years before, which makes this a late example, though perhaps not in the local context. It was built as part of a surge of post-war development in response to growth in the population and economy and following the lifting of restrictions imposed on building during and immediately after World War II. A new watch house keeper's residence, costing £4387, was built adjoining the existing residence at the same time.

In 1989 the demolition of the police station was proposed, but the people of Mackay strongly supported retention of the building, which underwent refurbishment in 1990–1991 as did the 1938 Court House. A large new police building on site includes a watch house, the old one being used now mainly for storage.

== Description ==
The court house and police complex is situated in the central business district of Mackay on the corner of Victoria and Brisbane Streets.

=== Police station (former court house) ===
The Police Station (former Court House) is a classical revival building of rendered brick scribed to resemble stonework and is set well back from the street. The majority of the building rises to 2 storeys and the roof is clad with corrugated fibrous cement sheeting. The street entrance features an arcaded Tuscan order portico with 3 bays separated by square pilasters rising through 2 stories to the triangular pediment, which has a circular louvred vent in its centre. Three square windows are located in the spandrel over the arches, each with a moulded frame all around. This entrance is flanked by single storey wings which continue the arcaded effect with arched windows, now filled with glass louvres. The windows in the upper storey and the side windows and porches on the lower storeys are shaded by sun hoods on cast iron brackets. Windows were double hung and timber framed: some of these have been replaced.

There is a tall brick chimney set back from each side of the entrance serving the corner fireplaces in the former female witnesses room and barristers room. A third chimney rises at the rear. Internally, the courtroom space is now occupied by offices although the ground floor plan is actually little changed.

=== Court house ===
The court house is a two-storey Georgian Revival building constructed of face brick with rendered detail. It has two hipped roof bays flanking a parapeted Tuscan giant order colonnade, with paired cement rendered concrete columns and a wrought iron balustrade. The rear elevation also has a two-storey verandah supported on Tuscan order columns with iron balustrading between. The high hipped main roof is clad in fibrous cement tiles and is topped by a fleche centred over an octagonal well in the first floor vestibule. The Brisbane Street elevation has a pedimented parapet with a circular louvred vent set in the gable. The building has multiple paned sash windows which are shaded by sun hoods on the lower floor. The interiors are well preserved and the entry and stair halls and the vestibule are panelled with polished silky oak, the floor being finished with coloured terrazzo.

=== Police residences ===
The police residences are a pair of brick bungalows prominently sited fronting Brisbane Street. They have hipped roofs; that of the Inspector's Residence being clad in corrugated iron and that of the keeper's residence in corrugated fibrous cement sheeting. Each has a projecting gabled room to the front with a bay window under a strongly defined gable end. Although such gables are a feature of this style, they visually echo the triangular pediment of the police station which they serve. The front entrance is from a small verandah with timber balustrading which is approached by low timber steps. The windows are paired casements. The houses are not identical although similar in form, and the floor plans differ, presumably to suit the use of the first tenants. The interiors still reflect the era in which they were built, although the inspector's house has been fitted out as an office. Both houses have hardwood floors, plastered walls and fibrous plaster ceilings with decorative mouldings.

=== Watch house ===
The watch house is 2 storey, rectangular in plan and is constructed of brick and patterned concrete blocks to an asymmetrical but balanced design. The main floor is elevated with undercroft car parking. Both levels are now used principally for storage. The northern wing is of face brick featuring boldly framed deep set square windows and houses a staircase, records and storage. It is linked to the main block by a lower, recessed section with a textured wall finish and slot glazing. The main block is screened by patterned Besser blocks. The interior is severely utilitarian in finish.

The watch keeper's residence is an extension of the 1935 keeper's residence and is similar in style on the exterior although the interior is more typical of its era and has an open plan layout.

== Heritage listing ==
Mackay Court House and Police Station was listed on the Queensland Heritage Register on 21 October 1992 having satisfied the following criteria.

The place is important in demonstrating the evolution or pattern of Queensland's history.

The complex which contains the current and former court houses, police residences and other police buildings, illustrates several patterns important in understanding the development of Queensland. As the site of a court and police station which developed through the late 19th and 20th centuries in response to changes to legislation, population and the administration of justice, it illustrates the way in which the legal system was implemented and administered. This is individually and collectively reflected in the buildings on site. The quality of the buildings, in design and material, also illustrates the importance of Mackay as a regional centre, both in the 1880s when sugar was booming, and during the period between the World Wars when Mackay was the fastest growing town in Queensland. The 1930s buildings are major examples of buildings constructed as part of the public works program undertaken by the Labor government during the Depression to alleviate unemployment.

As major public works, the court houses are important in the life and work of government architects JJ Clark and AB Leven, both architects of distinction, who made an important contribution to the development of architecture in Queensland.

The place has potential to yield information that will contribute to an understanding of Queensland's history.

The buildings on the site and the relationship between them, the fabric and design of the buildings and the extensive documentation connected with them are important because of their potential to provide information on both the city and the law which served it.

The place is important in demonstrating the principal characteristics of a particular class of cultural places.

The two court houses in particular are notable examples of public buildings of their era and exemplify the high-quality work produced by the office of the government architect.

The place is important because of its aesthetic significance.

As substantial and prominently sited public buildings, of architectural merit, they make an important visual contribution to the character of Mackay.

The place has a strong or special association with a particular community or cultural group for social, cultural or spiritual reasons.

The court house and police complex have had a long connection with the people of Mackay and the surrounding district as the focus for the administration of justice in the area.
