= Teepoo Hall =

- Born: Frederick Teepoo Hall; 1858; Mysore, India
- Died: 1909 (aged 50–51); Melbourne, Australia
- Occupations: Physician and masseur
- Title: Honorary Secretary of the Australasian Massage Association (now known as the Australian Physiotherapy Association)
- Spouse: Winifred Hall

Academic background
- Education: Bangalore College

Academic work
- Discipline: Physiotherapy
- Sub-discipline: Massage
- Institutions: Melbourne Hospital, 1900-1907, Austin Hospital, Melbourne

Frederick Teepoo Hall (1858 - 14 May 1909) was an Australian physician known for helping to establish the field of physiotherapy in Australia. He was Senior Masseur at the Melbourne Hospital from 1900 to 1907 and helped found the Australian Physiotherapy Association in 1905. During his life and career in Australia, Hall was a fierce advocate for the British Indian community, and fought against racially motivated immigration restrictions. Hall fell ill and retired from actively practicing medicine in 1908, before dying of his illness in 1909.

== Early life and education ==
Fredierick Teepoo Hall was born in Mysore, India in 1858. His mother was Indian while his father was an Englishman. He was trained in medicine at Bangalore College and entered the Subordinate Medical service in 1876, before serving in the Third Anglo-Burmese War.

== Career ==
=== Arrival in Australia, career beginnings ===
Around 1888, Hall emigrated to Melbourne, Colony of Victoria in 1888. When he arrived in Melbourne he began practicing massage in his office at Collins Street. He was assisted in establishing himself as a physician by Sir Thomas Naghten Fitzgerald.

As a politically savvy and well educated man, Hall quickly grew in prestige as a practitioner and had several clients from Melbourne's high society. Some of his patients included John Hope, 7th Earl of Hopetoun, Supreme Court Judge Hartley Williams and several journalists from The Age.

From 1890 onwards, Hall published testimonials from his clients in local newspapers, which grew his clientele. Despite living in Australia at a time when Asian immigrants were looked down upon by Australian society, he became a highly regarded teacher of white physicians.

He trained his assistants as part of a two-year apprenticeship, and helped to establish a high standard of medical professionalism in the Australian massage industry. From 1900 to 1907, Hall was the senior Masseur and massage demonstrator at Melbourne Hospital. He also held a position at the Austin Hospital, Melbourne.

=== Anglo-Indian advocacy and stance on immigration ===
Hall was very active in the Indian Australian community, and advocated for Indians' right to emigrate to and work in Australia. Hall co-founded the Australian chapter of the British Indian Association, and served as vice president of the chapter. However, since Hall had better English skills than Bux, he handled more practical aspects of leading the organization. After the institution of the Immigration Restriction Act 1901, which prevented non-Europeans from entering Australia, Hall petitioned the government to loosen restrictions on travel, arguing that it would be harmful to Australia's ability to trade with countries like India. Throughout his career, he continued to battle legislation which attempted to restrict non-white immigration to Australia.

=== Australasian Massage Association ===
Hall convened and presided over a meeting of scholars in 1905 to address the need for an organization which could regulate and protect the profession of massage. Hall's proposal gained traction in Australia and he convened another meeting in December of that year to form the Australasian Massage Association (AMA) with the purpose of establishing massage as a professional field. Hall was the honorary secretary of the organization, while Sir Thomas Anderson Stuart was the association's first president. The AMA later became known as the Australian Physiotherapy Association, and began publishing the Journal of Physiotherapy in 1954.

== Final years and death ==
Hall fell ill in 1908, and stepped back from practicing medicine. In September, some of his friends arranged a theatrical performance at the King's Theatre in Melbourne for his benefit. The performance was supposed to take place on 13 October. On 14 May 1909 it was announced in the papers that Hall had died at the age of 50.
