= Charters Towers Courthouse =

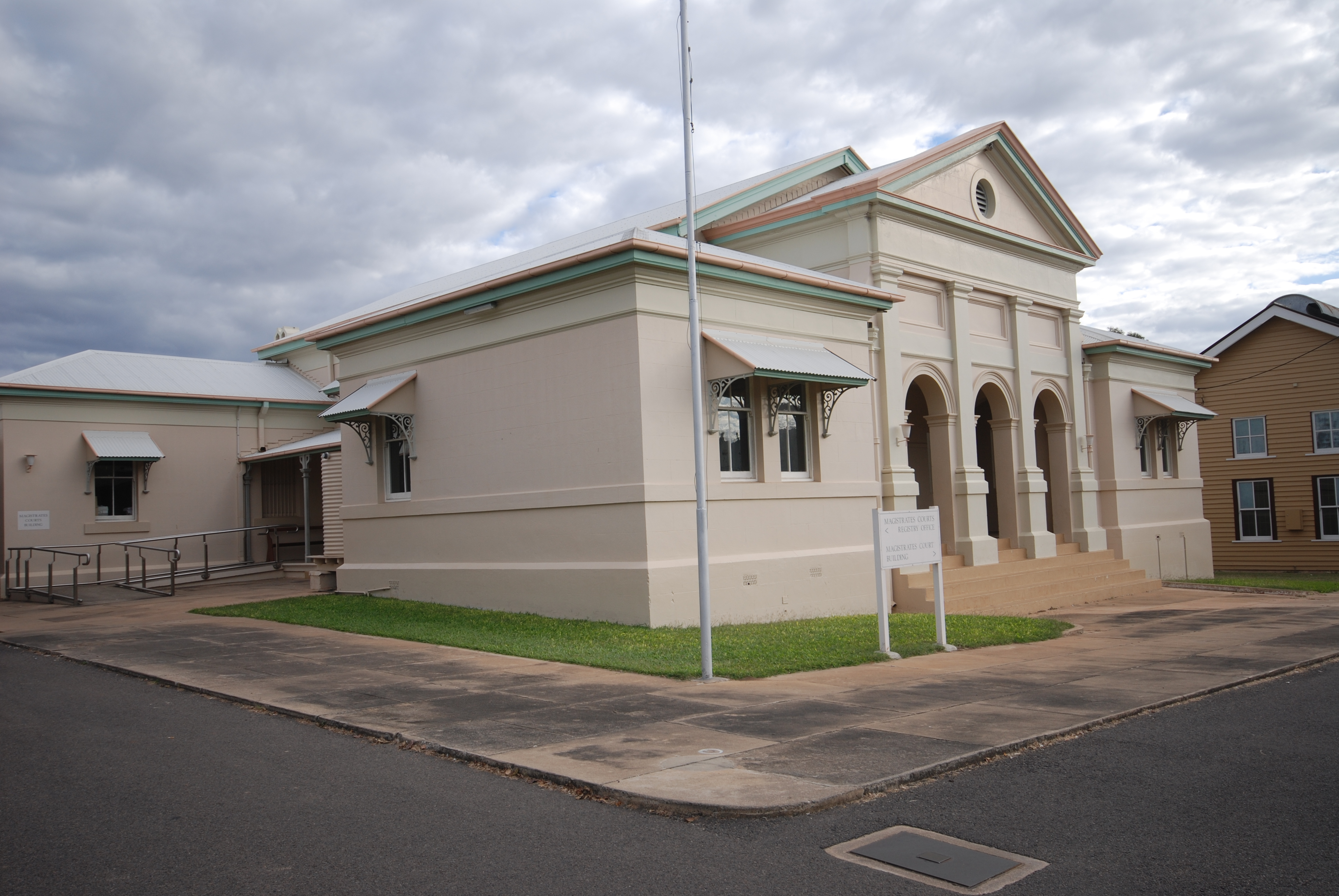
- Charters Towers Courthouse, 2009

- Location within Queensland
- 20.0783°S 146.2609°E
- Location: 28 Hodgkinson Street, Charters Towers City, Charters Towers, Charters Towers Region, Queensland, Australia

History
- Design period: 1870s–1890s (late 19th century)
- Built: 1886–1890

Site notes
- Architectural style: John James Clark

Queensland Heritage Register
- Official name: Charters Towers Court House
- Type: state heritage (built)
- Designated: 21 October 1992
- Reference no.: 600403
- Significant period: 1880s–1890s (historical); 1880s–1890s (fabric)
- Significant components: office/s, court house
- Builders: Charles Miller

Charters Towers Courthouse is a heritage-listed courthouse at 28 Hodgkinson Street, Charters Towers City, Charters Towers, Charters Towers Region, Queensland, Australia. It was designed by John James Clark and built in 1886 by Charles Miller. It is also known as Charters Towers Courthouse. It was added to the Queensland Heritage Register on 21 October 1992.

== History ==
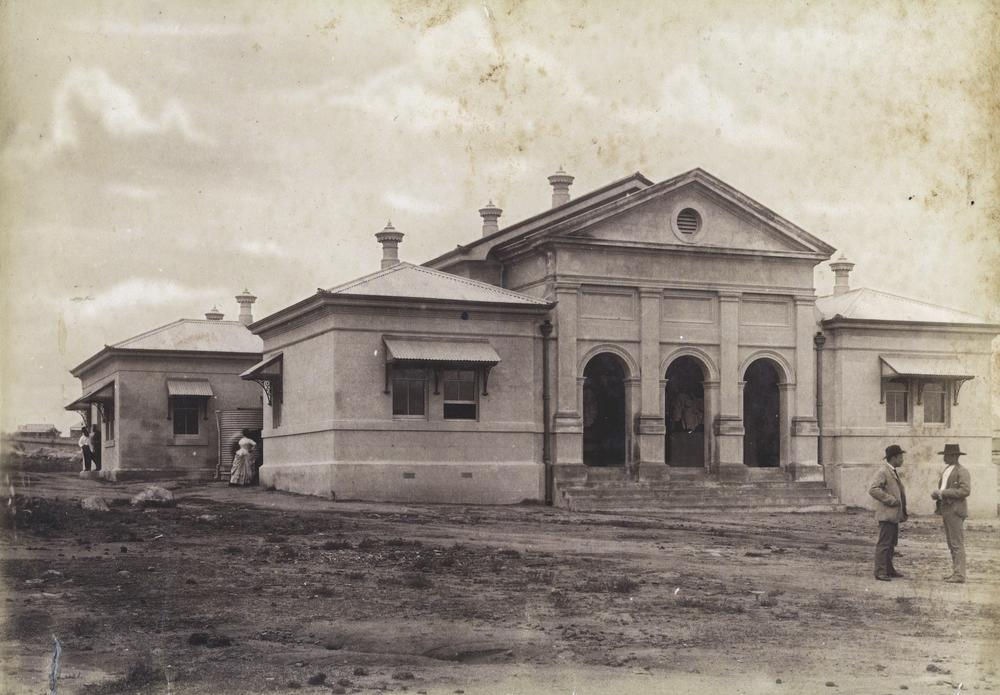
Charters Towers Court house c.1888.

The Charters Towers Courthouse was designed in 1885 by the Queensland Colonial Architect, John James Clark, as one of a series of substantial courthouses in major regional centres. It was completed in 1887 and extended by the addition of a wing in 1890.

Discovered in late 1871, Charters Towers became the richest of the North Queensland mining fields. The field was proclaimed a municipality (the Borough of Charters Towers) in 1877 and had become a prosperous settlement by 1882 when the Great Northern Railway line connected Charters Towers to the coast. Charters Towers gold was in deep reefs and the equipment needed to extract and process it was financed by substantial southern and overseas investment. The town became a major regional centre providing employment for a considerable number of people.

The 1880s was a period of expansion in Queensland generally as the economy enjoyed a boom and people poured into the colony. This necessitated an increase in police numbers and court facilities. In fact, police and judiciary facilities were constructed at such a pace in this period that it became difficult to obtain suitably qualified contractors. Charters Towers was amongst a number of regional centres where substantial new courthouses were erected, probably in response to the increase in its importance and population and in keeping with the handsome new buildings then rapidly replacing the modest structures of the early township.

The new courthouse was designed by noted architect J.J. Clark, who was at the time Colonial Architect. John James Clark was born and trained in Liverpool, England. He arrived in Melbourne in 1853 and won a number of architectural competitions; his success in such competitions being a feature of his career. Clark designed some major public buildings in Melbourne, including the Treasury, then moved to Sydney in 1881 and in 1883 became Queensland Colonial Architect. Although he left the position in 1885, he was responsible for some important public buildings during this time, including courthouses at Mackay, Rockhampton and Warwick. They and the Charters Towers courthouse were designed in the classical revival style thought appropriate for public buildings intended to convey a sense of stability and dignity, particularly a courthouse which represented the power of the law.

The Charters Towers courthouse was constructed by contractor Charles Miller at a cost of £4650 and opened on 9 February 1887. The local newspaper, The Northern Miner, indulged in some critical remarks about the appearance of the building, describing it as "unpretentious", but admitted that it was commodious and well ventilated. In general style and layout it resembled that of the courthouse at Mackay, built about the same time. Apart from the court, rooms were provided for the judge, police magistrate, Clerk of Petty Sessions, jury, witnesses and gold warden, plus a number of other offices. Even so, by 1890 the building had become inadequate, reflecting the rapid growth of the city. Local building contractor, Benjamin Toll, was employed to construct a large brick extension with verandahs on three sides alongside the court and connected to it.

The courthouse has changed little since and has served the Charters Towers and district community in this capacity for over a hundred years, with the 1890s wing now providing office space for the Department of Mines and Energy and the Department of Natural Resources.

== Description ==
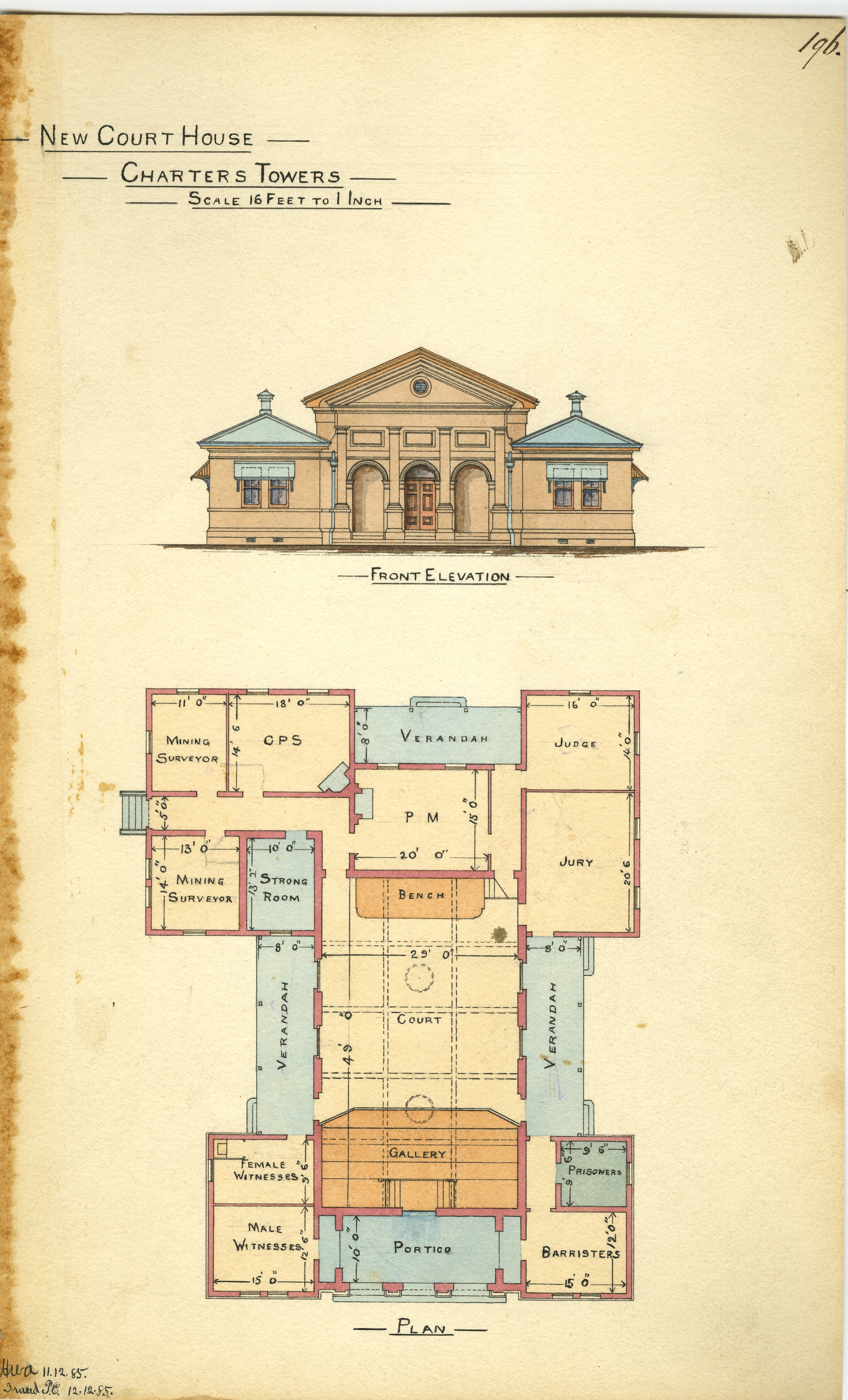
Architectural drawing of the new Court House, Charters Towers, 1885

The courthouse consists of 2 brick buildings parallel to each other and connected at the rear. They are situated on a large government reserve at the corner of Hodgkinson and Church Streets, Charters Towers, along with the former School of Mines.

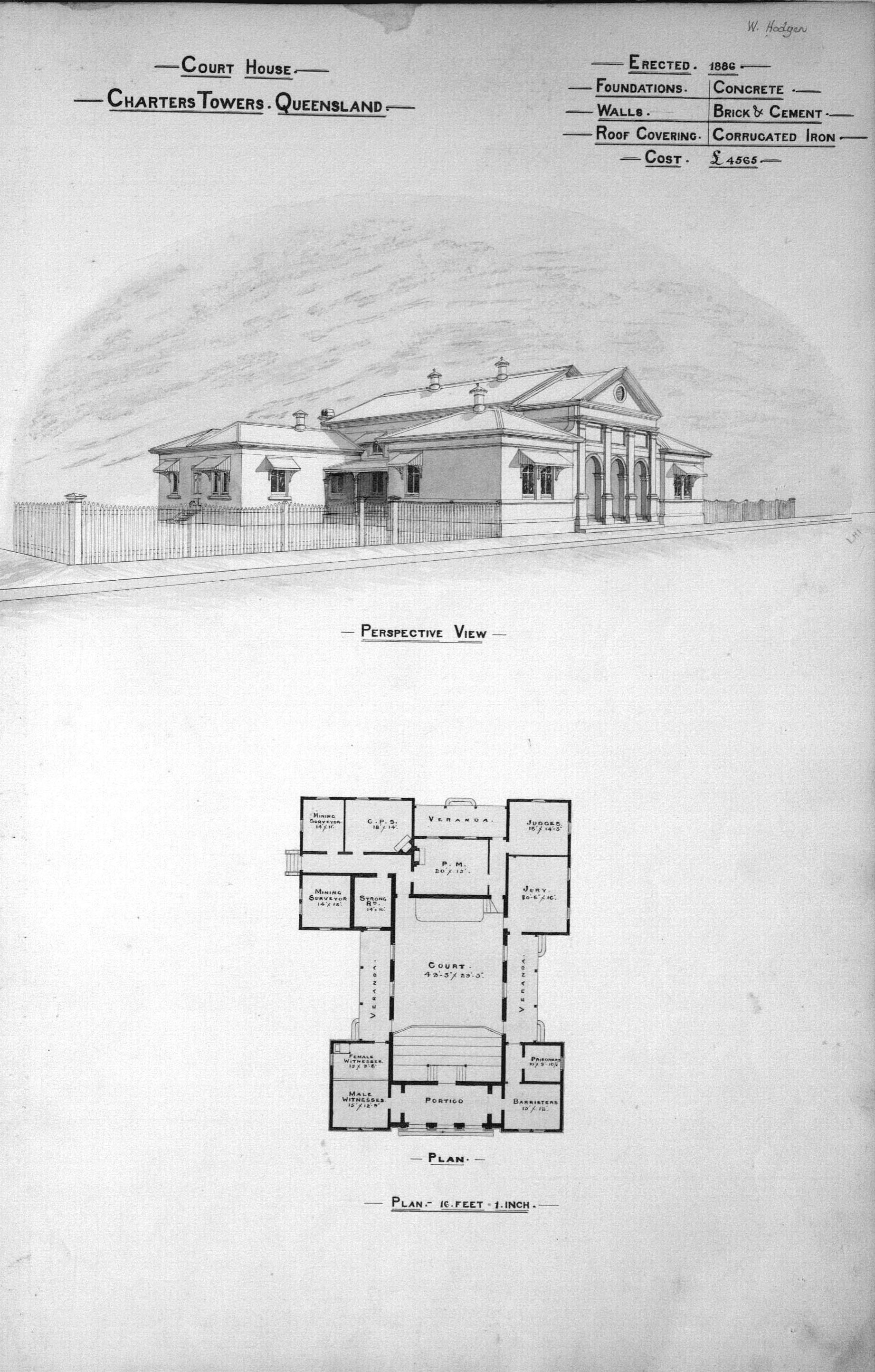
Perspective view of the Court House, 1888

The original courthouse is a classical revival building of rendered brick with a corrugated iron roof and is set well back facing Hodgkinson Street. The core of the building is the court room which rises to 2 storeys and is approached through a slightly lower portico with a Tuscan order arcade of 3 bays separated by square pilasters rising through 2 stories to the triangular pediment, which has a circular louvred vent in its centre. This entrance is flanked by single storey attached pavilions with pyramid roofs. These have pairs of sash windows shaded by a sun hood on cast iron brackets. The rear of the building has similar pavilion style wings linked by a verandah, and a verandah links the front and rear pavilions on the western side. The eastern verandah area is now used for disabled parking. The rear pavilion on the eastern side is linked to the newer building and now houses a tea room. It retains a chimney and corner fireplace. Other rooms to the rear include offices and a strong room. The court room is still in use for this purpose and has plastered walls and a rather austere coffered ceiling. There is a public gallery at the northern end. It retains cedar furniture and fittings.

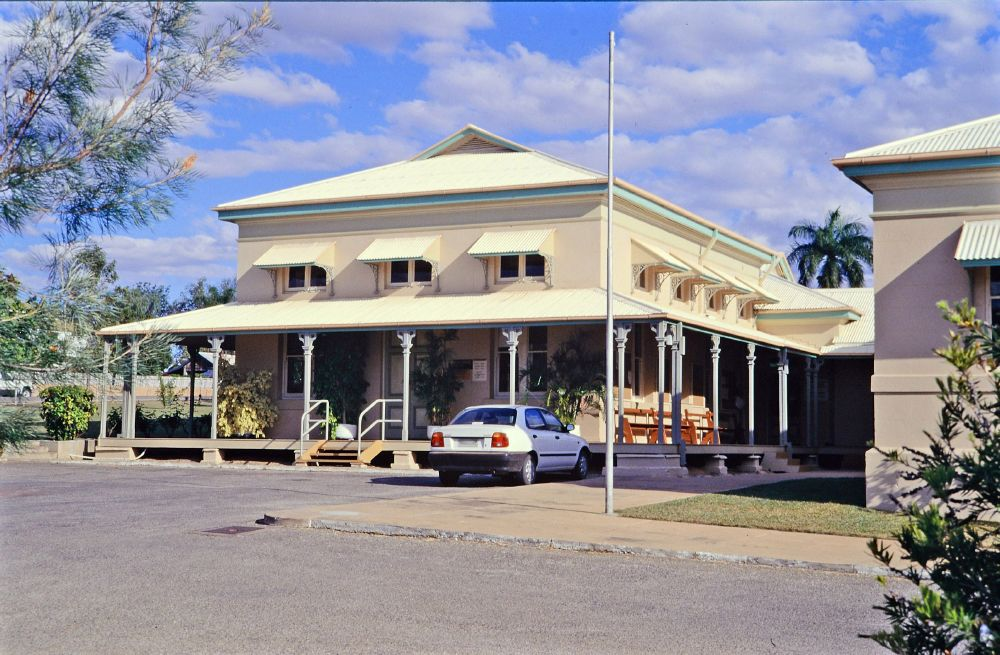
Rear extension from 1890, as seen in 1997

The 1890s extension building is set back from the older building and only joins it towards the rear. It is constructed of brick with a gambrel roof clad in corrugated iron and is basically rectangular in form. For much of its length it is free standing, having a ground floor verandah and awning which encircles the front and sides. This is supported on posts with decorative brackets. The building is symmetrical and has its own central entrance consisting of double doors flanked by windows and approached from across the verandah by low steps.

It houses the offices of the Department of Justice and Attorney General and other government department tenancies.

== Heritage listing ==
Charters Towers Courthouse was listed on the Queensland Heritage Register on 21 October 1992 having satisfied the following criteria.

The place is important in demonstrating the evolution or pattern of Queensland's history.

Charters Towers, as an extraordinarily rich goldfield, made a major contribution to the economy of Queensland and to the development of the North. The Charters Towers Courthouse, constructed in 1886 and extended in the 1890s, demonstrates the growth of Charters Towers as a major goldfield and reflects its importance as a regional centre in the late 19th century.

The place demonstrates rare, uncommon or endangered aspects of Queensland's cultural heritage.

The court room remains substantially unchanged since completion and retains the major components of its original furniture, which is now rare.

The place is important in demonstrating the principal characteristics of a particular class of cultural places.

The courthouse is characteristic of major regional courthouses, influenced by classical revival styles imbuing tradition and authority and providing a lofty courtroom with attendant offices. It is a fine example of a public building of its era and demonstrates the high quality work produced by the Colonial Architect's office in the late nineteenth century.

The place is important because of its aesthetic significance.

As a substantial and prominently sited public building, of architectural merit, it makes an important visual contribution to the character of Charters Towers.

The place has a strong or special association with a particular community or cultural group for social, cultural or spiritual reasons.

The courthouse has had a long connection with the people of Charters Towers and the surrounding district as the focus for the administration of justice in the area.

The place has a special association with the life or work of a particular person, group or organisation of importance in Queensland's history.

As a major public building designed during his tenure as Colonial architect, the courthouse has important associations with the life and work of JJ Clark who made an important contribution to the development of architecture in Queensland.
