= Andrew Baxter Leven =

Scottish architect

Andrew Baxter Leven (2 February 1885 – 1966) was a Scottish-born architect in Australia. As chief architect in the Queensland Department of Public Works, he designed many of Queensland's public buildings, some of which are now heritage-listed.

== Early life ==
Leven was born in Montrose, Angus in 1885. Leven trained as an architect in Scotland and then immigrated to Queensland in 1910 on the recommendation of friends.

== Architectural career ==
He became chief architect of the Queensland Department of Public Works (Queensland Government Architect) in 1927.

He was a Fellow of the Royal Australian Institute of Architects and chairman of the Board of Architects of Queensland and a member of the Architecture Faculty of the University of Queensland.

== Person life ==
Leven married Ethel Maud Richardson in 1919. They had one son and one daughter. He retired in February 1951 and died in 1966 in Brisbane.

== Notable works ==
- ANZAC Square, Brisbane
- Brisbane Dental Hospital and College
- Mackay Court House
- University of Queensland Mayne Medical School
