= Nurses and Midwives WA =

- Abbreviation: NMWA
- Founder: Australian Nursing and Midwifery Federation
- Founded: 13 November 2023
- Headquarters: Perth, Western Australia

Nurses and Midwives WA (NMWA) is an Australian political party, founded in 2023 by the Australian Nursing Federation (ANF).

The idea of registering a political party was first floated by the ANF in August 2023, and was formalised months later in November.

The party achieved the 500 members needed for registration in February 2024 and plans to contest the 2025 Western Australian state election, running candidates in the Legislative Council.
