= Barbara Carson =

Australian trade union leader

- Carson in approximately 1985
- Born: 22 March 1927; Bundaberg
- Died: 17 November 2015 (aged 88); Geelong
- Occupations: nurse, union branch secretary
- Employer: Australian Nursing and Midwifery Federation
- Known for: creating a union for nurses
- Successor: Irene Bolger
- Partner: Jenny

Barbara Carson (22 March 1927 – 17 November 2015) was an Australian nurse and trade union leader who led the Victoria State branch of the Australian Nursing and Midwifery Federation to its first ever strike in 1985.

== Life ==
Carson was born in Bundaberg in 1927. She trained as a nurse at Queensland's Maryborough Base Hospital. In 1971 she was promoted to Chief Nursing Officer. She later left to join what was then called the Royal Australian Nursing Federation. She was elected to be the Federation's branch secretary. Changes were introduced to the RANF including allowing nursing student members to vote in RANF elections. RANF created examinations for members of their profession and preparation could be made for the exams on college courses. RANF members, for the first time were given indemnity insurance. Carson most important change, followed her successful campaign, was to remove a clause in the Victoria branch rules of the Australian Nursing and Midwifery Federation in 1984 that prohibited strikes. In 1985 Carson organised a successful five-day strike that protested against nurses being required to do non-nursing duties.

Carson resigned in January 1986. Membership of the federation had increased and there were over 21,000 members. When Carson had started it was around 13,000. Irene Bolger, who had previously and unsuccessfully stood for election against Carson, became the replacement branch secretary.

== Death and legacy ==
Carson died on 17 November 2015 in Geelong leaving her companion, Jenny. Belinda Morieson who succeeded Bolger as Branch secretary credits Carson as "the first leader to industrialise and make a union of the ANF".

The Carson Conference Centre at the Victorian Branch of the ANMF is named in honour of Carson.
