= Mackay Customs House =

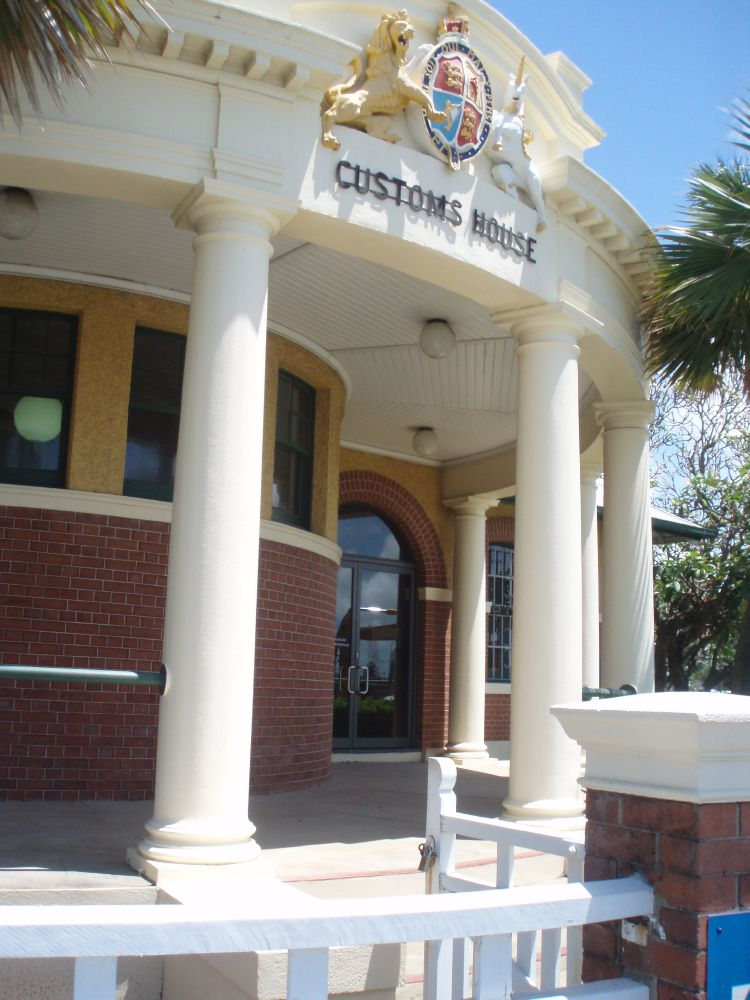
- Entrance to Mackay Customs House, 2010

- Location within Queensland Location within Australia
- 21.1397°S 149.1871°E
- Location: 31 River Street, Mackay, Mackay Region, Queensland, Australia

History
- Design period: 1900–1914 (early 20th century)
- Built: 1902

Site notes
- Architect: John Smith Murdoch (attributed)

Queensland Heritage Register
- Official name: Mackay Customs House
- Type: state heritage (built)
- Designated: 7 February 2005
- Reference no.: 600669
- Significant period: 1900s, 1935 (fabric); 1900s–1920s (historical)
- Significant components: trees/plantings, store – bond, fence/wall – perimeter, garage, customs house
- Builders: MS Caskie

Mackay Customs House is a heritage-listed customs house at 31 River Street, Mackay, Mackay Region, Queensland, Australia. The design is attributed to John Smith Murdoch and the builder was MS Caskie. It was completed in April 1902. It was added to the Queensland Heritage Register on 7 February 2005.

== History ==
The Mackay Customs House was completed in April 1902. The design of the building is attributed to John Smith Murdoch, District Architect with the Queensland Public Works Department, and it was constructed by MS Caskie for the tender price of £3797/18/0.

In search of new pastoral land, John Mackay and his party entered and named the valley of the Mackay River in 1860 (renamed Pioneer River in 1862), and the following year he returned to establish a cattle station. In 1862, the ketch "Presto" entered the Mackay River landing stores and building materials, then surveyed the river mouth, which consequently was gazetted as a Port of Entry. The first settlers arrived in October 1862, establishing the settlement of Port Mackay on the south bank of the river. In January 1863, John Tanner Baker was appointed Sub Collector of Customs for the new port (Baker also acted as Harbour Master and Magistrate). He arrived in February setting up in a tent, but soon established the Customs Office in a corner of the large store of Byrnes, Basset and Co. located on the riverbank. By the end of 1863, the name of the river had been changed to the Pioneer River, the first survey of the town of Mackay had been made, and the first land sale of town lots had been held.

It was soon obvious better premises were needed for the Queensland Customs Service in Mackay, and in 1864, £1000 was allocated for a new building. By May 1865 the Queensland Colonial Architect reported that the new timber Mackay Customs House had been completed. It was located on the corner of a large "Reserve for Government Buildings", overlooking the river.

The town of Mackay soon began to prosper through the growth of the port, the nearby pastoral holdings, and the plantations along the river which included the beginnings of the local sugar industry. River Street developed as a busy waterfront precinct with wharves (the Government wharf opened in 1868), warehouses, offices, ships' chandleries, boat builders, hotels and boarding houses, and the Customs complex which by 1870 included the Customs House, the bond store and the Sub Collectors residence.

By 1895, agitation had begun for a new Customs House befitting Mackay's prosperity and importance. Lacking funds, the Government constructed a timber extension to the existing building. The community protested, pointing out that these extensions contravened legislation and should have been of non-combustible materials. The agitation for a new Customs House continued, and in 1900 drawings for a new brick building were prepared and tenders called.

The design of the Mackay Customs House is attributed to JS Murdoch, District Architect Northern Division for the Queensland Works Department. At this time, Alfred Barton Brady was Queensland Government Architect and Acting Under Secretary of the Works Department (as shown on the tender notice), and Thomas Pye was District Architect Southern Division, and they both may have had input into the design. Under this team, the Government Architect's Office produced many of Queensland's finest public buildings, including a number for the new Commonwealth.

JS Murdoch was also responsible for the Customs Houses of Maryborough, Bundaberg and Townsville, which exhibit some similarities in style to that of Mackay. He later joined the Commonwealth Government where he was involved in the planning of Canberra and the design of the provisional Parliament House and the Canberra Hotel, and rose to the positions of Chief Architect and Commonwealth Director-General of Works.

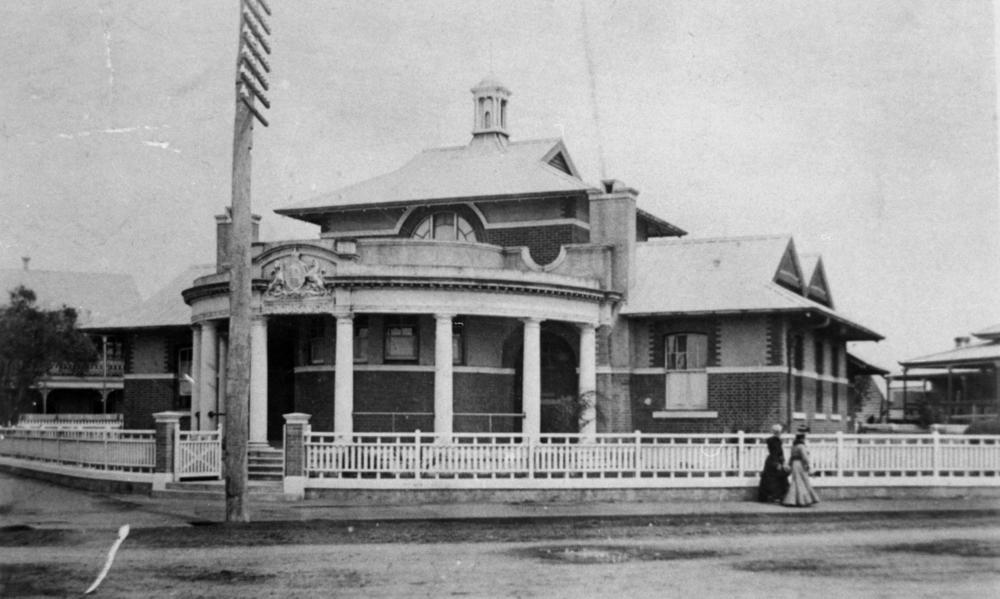
Mackay Customs House, circa 1909

The Mackay Customs House was completed in April 1902. It was reported as featuring locally made bricks, cement and plaster finishing, rolled galvanised iron roof, wood and zinc ceilings, and joinery and fittings of cedar. The original timber Customs House was moved sideways to become the front portion of the adjacent Second Officer's Quarters.

The original Reserve for Government Buildings was divided into the Customs House Reserve and the Post and Telegraph Reserve. In 1905, the Commonwealth subdivided the Customs Reserve further, returning the portion which included the Quarters to the State. Also in 1905, palm trees were planted to the north and the east of the Customs House.

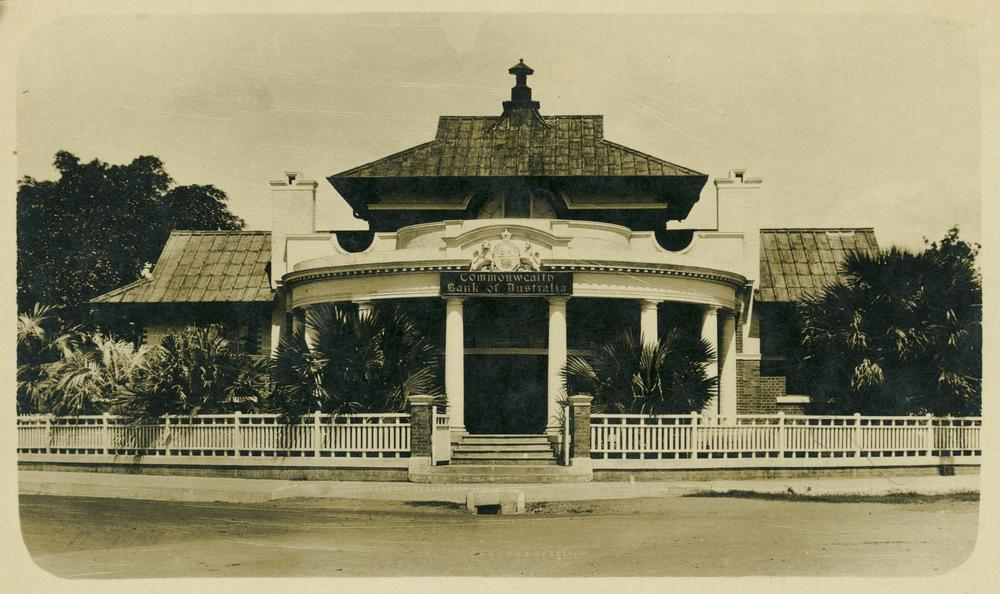
Mackay Customs House being used by the Commonwealth Bank (note the signage over the entrance)

In 1921, the Commonwealth Bank leased the Customs House for 10 years, moving the Customs Service back into the adjacent timber building. The Customs House has since been altered several times for multiple occupancy, housing various other government departments. The brick Bond Store, on the south-east corner of the site addressing Sydney Street, was constructed about 1935.

Following the devastating cyclone of 1918, Mackay enjoyed a period of substantial growth through the 1920s and 1930s. Local member and Premier of Queensland William Forgan Smith promoted Mackay's development, strongly supporting the Mackay Harbour Project and the Sydney Street bridge replacement. The first Sydney Street bridge, completed in 1887, was the second bridge across the river at Mackay, but for some time lead to nowhere. Located adjacent to the Customs House, it marked the "head of navigation" of the Pioneer River. The new bridge was completed in 1938, increasing traffic along Sydney Street to North Mackay.

The inadequacy of the river port had been recognised by 1914. In 1939, the new Mackay Outer Harbour was opened, and the services of the river port gradually transferred to the new harbour. Apart from the Customs House and the Bond Store, only a few of the buildings of the former river port still survive. In 1969–70, extensions were made to the rear of the Customs House. In the late 1980s, conservation and restoration works were undertaken, reversing some of the alterations which had been made to the interior of the building.

In 2004, the Customs House was sold to Alman Partners, a financial planning firm. In 2006, Alman Partners was awarded the Mackay City Council Heritage Award for their restoration of the building. Alman Partners sold the Customs House in September 2020 to Dean Williamson Dental, a local general dental practice who continue to run their dental surgery from the building.

In 2022, Dean Williamson Dental was awarded for its adaptive re-use of the State-Heritage Listed building. The refurbishments respected the origins and heritage features of the building whilst giving this iconic landmark a new direction and purpose. Dean Williamson Dental overcame a number of hurdles to repurpose the building while respecting the main heritage elements of the building.

== Description ==
The Mackay Customs House is a single storey brick building located at the corner of Sydney and River Streets, Mackay on the southern bank of the Pioneer River. It sits diagonally across the property, addressing the street corner and facing north-east towards the river mouth and the remaining buildings of the river port. Sydney Street continues north from this intersection as the Forgan Bridge across the river to North Mackay.

At the centre of the symmetrical plan of this building is the Customs Office or Long Room. To the front is the semi-circular public area with encircling colonnade, and to each side are offices, separated from the Long Room by a corridor. At the rear is an enclosed verandah, from which open several utility rooms including toilets and the strong room.

The elevations are also formal in composition, and predominantly symmetrical. The corrugated steel roof is highly modelled, with decorative timber gablets and rafter ends. The external walls are tuck-pointed red brick to the mid-height of the double-hung windows which have decorative metal security grills placed in place, with "roughcast" stucco panels with brick quoining above.

Raised several steps above the ground, the curved entrance colonnade has columns of Doric order supporting a moulded entablature. At its centre is a raised parapet with the Royal coat of arms in relief at its centre. From this colonnade, there is access to the public area through two pairs of French doors with leadlight glass panels, and access to the staff areas through timber panelled doors. The owners have undertaken some minor works including the removal of metal grill gates at the top of the steps to the colonnade entrance, and replaced these with slate grey, steel framed doors with full glazing panels.

Dividing the public area from the Long Room is a moulded archway and a panelled cedar counter. The Long Room is a double-height symmetrical space with semi-circular clerestory windows to each side, decorative pressed metal ceiling, and plaster mouldings to the opening surrounds. The interior of the building has plaster walls and varnished cedar joinery including doors, architraves and skirtings. Apart from the Long Room and the public area, the ceilings are tongue-and-groove timber boarding.

To the south-east corner of the site is the former bond store. It is a rectangular single-storey building, which addresses Sydney Street with a gabled parapet and awning over the footpath. The external walls are rendered masonry, and feature stucco panels to the upper sections reflecting the detail of the Customs House. To the rear of the site is a garage building, with a central bay of brick and lean-to additions enclosed in steel mesh to either side.

To both street frontages is a timber picket and rail fence with brick corner posts. The garden has palm trees, lawns and concrete paths, with a bitumen car parking area at the rear of the site

== Heritage listing ==
Mackay Customs House was listed on the Queensland Heritage Register on 7 February 2005 having satisfied the following criteria.

The place is important in demonstrating the evolution or pattern of Queensland's history.

Completed in 1902, the Mackay Customs House is located on the site of Mackay's first Customs House constructed in 1865. Community agitation resulted in the earlier timber building being replaced by a new brick structure befitting Mackay's prosperity at that time. Originally part of a Government Reserve surveyed soon after the settlement of Mackay, the site has been associated with the Customs Service for over 130 years. Located on the southern bank of the Pioneer River, the Mackay Customs House faces north-east towards the river mouth, and the precinct of the former river port of which it is one of few surviving structures. The Customs House also addresses the approach to the Forgan Bridge, which marked the head of navigation of the river.

The place is important in demonstrating the principal characteristics of a particular class of cultural places.

The Customs House was constructed in the first years of the new Commonwealth for Commonwealth use. It uses the architectural language of a domestic style of the period, sometimes termed "Federation", which was part of a broader movement searching for a cultural identity for the new nation. As the office of the Australian Customs Service in Mackay for a century, it displays the coat of arms in relief on the front parapet, and its central and grandest space is the Long Room, which is a symbolic and traditional element of a Customs House. The Bond Store which is an important part of a functioning customs house remains on the site adjacent to the Customs House. The exterior and interior of the building are substantially as they were when constructed. Exterior features include the curved entrance colonnade, "roughcast" stucco panels, gable treatments and tuck pointed brickwork. The interior has decorative metal and boarded ceilings, moulded plaster wall decoration and panels, leadlight door panels, cedar joinery, and clerestory windows to the Long Room.

The place is important because of its aesthetic significance.

The design of the building is attributed to JS Murdoch, District Architect with the Queensland Works Department, during a period when many great public buildings in Queensland were designed by that office under AB Brady and Thomas Pye. It shows a high degree of technical competence, successfully combining picturesque qualities and domestic scale with the traditional formality of government buildings. Along with several contemporary Customs Houses, it is one of the few Queensland public buildings of that style. Murdoch later had a successful architectural career with the Commonwealth government, playing a substantial role in the development of early Canberra.
