= Evelyn Paget Evans =

Australian medical administrator

Evelyn Paget Evans MBE
- Born: 11 November 1881; Auckland, New Zealand
- Died: 10 April 1960 (aged 78); Rydalmere, New South Wales, Australia

Evelyn Paget Evans MBE (11 November 1881 – 10 April 1960) was an Australian administrator. She led several organisations associated with medicine and nursing. She argued against nurses being in a union and for giving them improved working conditions. She was secretary of the Australian Physiotherapy Association from 1917 until 1956.

== Life ==
Evans was born in Auckland in 1881. Her parents were, Lillie Goodisson and her husband Lawford David Evans, who were both born in Wales. Her parents had married in London and then they emigrated to New Zealand. Her father was a doctor and her mother managed a private hospital in St Kilda. Her father died in 1903 and her mother remarried in the following year.

Evans had trained as a typist and a key point in her career was in July 1917. She was appointed to be not only the secretary to the Australasian Trained Nurses Association but also the General secretary of the Australian Physiotherapy Association which was then called the Australian Massage Association. She was the first paid secretary of the Australasian Trained Nurses Association and she oversaw the Australasian Nurses' Journal. In 1924 the Australian Nursing Federation was founded and Evans became the secretary to all three organisations.

In 1931 the New South Wales Nurses and Midwives' Association was formed despite Evans' opposition (as it was a union). She (and her employers) believed that nurses should not be in a trade union. She had previously given evidence to the Industrial Commission of New South Wales in 1929; and in 1934 she argued a similar point when she opposed a proposal to reduce the time that a nurse was required to work each working week. The rationale was that improving a nurses conditions at work would only encourage more people to join an over supplied profession.

In 1938 the Gazette noted that she had become a sister of St John and she served during World War Two. In 1946 she retired from the Australasian Trained Nurses Association with a £300 allowance and she was made the vice-president of the newly opened A.T.N.A. House. She would have retired the year before but no one was willing to take the job at the salary Evans had been paid. A.T.N.A. House was a retirement home for nurses and she had served on the committee that had created it.

Evans was appointed a Member of the Order of the British Empire in the 1955 New Year Honours. She was still the secretary and Chief Executive Officer of the Australian Physiotherapy Association until 1956.

Evans died in Sydney at Rydalmere mental hospital in 1960.
