= Margaret Anne Lyons =

Australian Nurse Activist

- Born: Margaret "Greta" Anne Lyons; 1869; Kyneton, Victoria, Australia
- Died: November 15, 1923 (aged 53–54)
- Occupations: Activist for nurses' rights, a private hospital owner
- Parent(s): Martin Lyons and Mary Elizabeth Moylan

Margaret "Greta" Anne Lyons (born in 1869) was an activist for nurses' rights, a private hospital owner, and a founding member of multiple nurses' associations.

Born in Kyneton, Victoria, Australia, Lyons trained in general nursing at the Alfred Hospital. She moved on to private nursing and established a career in activism for nurses' rights. She founded the Alfred Hospital Nurses League, Victorian Trained Nurses Association, The Trained Nurses Guild, and the Society for the Health of Women and Children.

== Early life and education ==
Margaret Anne Lyons, also known as Greta Lyons, was born in Kyneton, Victoria, Australia in 1869. She was born to Martin Lyons and Mary Elizabeth Moylan. Martin Lyons died on June 14, 1895, from a heart condition. Lyons was the second oldest of seven children. She went on to graduate as a general nurse from Alfred Hospital in July 1898.

== Midlife ==
Lyons was a founding member of the Royal Victorian Trained Nurses Association (RVTNA), created in 1901. She stayed with the organization for twenty years, advocating for nurses as private hospitals continued to take advantage of them.

Between 1898 and 1905, Lyons worked at Bendigo Hospital as a private nurse.

In 1905, Lyons transferred to the Williamstown Hospital. She was described by the Williamstown Hospital committee as "highly skilled."

In 1908, Lyons refurbished an old hospital and named it Glenhope.

In 1912, Lyons traveled to both Paris and London. While there, she learned about the "baby clinics" and schools for mothers that were offered. She was not impressed with the system, calling it a scheme "in vogue". While in France, she studied chiropody and upon returning to Australia she established a private practice in the specialty.

In 1914, Lyons and her colleague Maud Primrose created the Society for the Health of Women and Children. The organization strived to improve the health of mothers and babies.

In 1918, Lyons established the Alfred Hospital Nurses League, a recreational club to encourage community and socializing within the hospital.

== Private hospital ==
Lyons bought an old hospital in 1908 and refurbished it. Repairs took two years. Lyons officially opened her hospital in 1910. It was based in the former home and medical residence of a man named Dr. Edward Bonaventure Heffernan. The house was constructed in 1895 at 8 Brunswick Street, Fitzroy VIC 3065. The house was demolished in 1956. The hospital was named Glenhope, but it was referred to as "Miss Lyons' Private Hospital" by locals

In 1914, Lyons submitted a letter to the British Journal of Nursing encouraging young women to take up nursing and even find work at her private hospital. The letter included information pertaining to the fees she charged for foot pain treatment. 5 shillings for the public, and 3 shillings and sixpence for nurses and workers.

In 1918, Lyons became the president of the Royal Victorian Trained Nurses Association.

== Late life ==
In 1921, frustrated with the RVTNA's inaction regarding harsh working conditions for nurses, Lyons left the organization and established the Trained Nurses Guild (TNG). It was registered as an industrial establishment under the Federal Court of Arbitration. The VTNA repealed the registration of the TNG under the excuse that nursing was not an industrial practice. Lyons did not attempt to take further action with the guild, likely because she was battling cancer at the time. Nonetheless, her efforts helped pave the way for the Australian Nursing Federation.

In 1922, Lyons traveled to the United States with the intent of comparing the working conditions of nurses between the US and Australia. She seemed impressed with the eight-hour workday and approved of the way women supported each other in universities and colleges. She noted the difference in fashion, appreciating the lack of boned corsets and high-heeled shoes.

== Death ==
On November 15, 1923, Lyons died from cancer. She was 53 years old. Her estate was left to her sister, Clare Cormick. As a tribute, Mrs. Ellis Brown, a fellow nurse in the Alfred Hospital Nurses League, hung a watercolor portrait of Lyons in her home.

== Organizations ==
- Royal Victorian Trained Nurses Association
- Trained Nurses Guild
- Alfred Hospital Nurses League
- Society for the Health of Women and Children
- Women's Citizens Movement
- Australian Trained Nurses Association
