= Irene Bolger =

Australian trade unionist, barrister and politician

- Born: c.1943
- Occupations: trade unionist and barrister
- Employer: Australian Nursing and Midwifery Federation
- Known for: nurses strike leader
- Predecessor: Barbara Carson
- Successor: Belinda Morieson
- Political party: Australian Labor Party; Labour Coalition

Irene Bolger (c.1943 - ) is an Australian trade unionist, barrister and politician. She led a successful 50 day strike by nurses in Victoria. She was sacked and reinstated by the Australian Nursing and Midwifery Federation. After failing to be re-elected as branch secretary she trained as a barrister.

== Life ==
Bolger was born in about 1943 and she spent her childhood in the fishing town of Port Albert in South Gippsland. She failed to gain a school certificate at the Our Lady of Sion at Sale and in 1968 she went to work at The Alfred Hospital as a nurse. In her spare time she was a left-wing member of the Australian Labor Party (ALP). In 1983 she joined the Royal Australian Nursing Federation and she became an organiser who advocated industrial action by the union.

In 1984 Barbara Carson led a successful campaign to remove a clause in the Victoria branch rules of the Australian Nursing and Midwifery Federation that prohibited strikes. In the following year she led a successful five-day strike against nurses being required to do non-nursing duties. Carson resigned in 1986 and Bolger, who had previously and unsuccessfully stood for election against Carson, became the branch secretary.

Bolger led another longer strike in 1986. In October 1986, 5,000 nurses voted at a group meeting to go on an indefinite strike. The strike lasted 50 days and resulted in an increased offer from the state of Victoria.

In 1989 Bolger was in hospital when she was sacked by the union after she was accused of breaking union rules. Bolger took the case to court and she had her salary restored. The Federal court restored her membership of the union but she was not allowed to visit her place of employment. She went to a meeting of the nurses to defend her position but the organisers switched off the lights and sound system. At the next ballot she stood as an outsider, but she was beaten by Belinda Morieson who took 4124 votes to Bolger's 3185. The defeat left her without sufficient money and she had to sell her flat where she and her teenage son lived.

In 1996 she stood as an independent for election to represent Batman. She came fourth out of eight candidates. The winner was from the Australian Labor Party and he got more than ten times as many votes.

Bolger became a student-rights officer at the Royal Melbourne Institute of Technology until she enrolled as a mature student of law. She was 56 in 1999, when she qualified as a lawyer after she worked for a year at the Supreme Court under Philip Cummins.

Bolger served on the Australian Labor Party's administrative committee in New South Wales. She left the party to form a new "Labour Coalition" party in 2015 describing the ALP as "gutless". She stood for election to the Senate for Victoria and the party's other candidate, Mark Ptolemy, stood in New South Wales.

== Legacy ==
The effect of nurses being able to strike on attitudes was important. The strike that Bolger had led was a strike for and led by women. Bolger has noted that many history books do not mention the strike. It was “lengthy on an international scale, it was 50 days of rage. But still I can't seem to find any reference to one of the most significant strikes in Australian history. The sexism continues."
