= Queensland Nurses and Midwives' Union =

- Queensland Nurses and Midwives' Union of Employees
- Founded: November 8, 1921; 104 years ago
- Headquarters: West End, Queensland
- Members: 67,000 (2021)
- President: Simon Mitchell
- Vice-President: Lucynda Maskell
- Secretary: Sarah Beaman
- Key people: Grant Burton - Assistant Secretary (Nursing); Fridae King - Assistant Secretary (Midwifery)
- Affiliations: Queensland Council of Unions; Australian Nursing and Midwifery Federation
- Website: qnmu.org.au
- Formerly called: Australasian Trained Nurses' Association (Queensland Branch); Queensland Nurses' Union; Royal Australian Nursing Federation, Queensland Branch

The Queensland Nurses and Midwives' Union (QNMU), formally the Queensland Nurses and Midwives' Union of Employees, is a trade union representing nurses and midwives in Queensland, Australia. The QNMU is the state affiliate of the Australian Nursing and Midwifery Federation, and represents nurses and midwives of the public sector (i.e., Queensland Health) and private employers.

== History ==
The union was formed on 8 November 1921 under the name of the Australasian Trained Nurses' Association (Queensland Branch) Union of Employees. Its current incarnation began in 1982 when the union broke away from the Royal Australian Nursing Federation, now known as the Australian Nursing and Midwifery Federation (ANMF).

Before being known as the Queensland Nurses and Midwives' Union, the union went under the name of the Queensland Nurses' Union. This was changed in 2017.

Before this the union was known as the Royal Australian Nursing Federation, Queensland Branch, Union of Employees. This royal title was assumed, like other branches of the federation, in 1956 to mark the Queen's visit to Australia.

The QNMU is affiliated with the Queensland Council of Unions, and in the late 1980s signed a "harmonisation" agreement with the then ANF which recognised members of the then QNU as members of the Queensland Branch of the ANF.

In September 2010 the union announced the end of its affiliation with the Australian Labor Party.

== Notable people ==
- Ellen Barron, joint honorary secretary, 1922–1933.
- Florence Chatfield, presided over the founding meeting in 1904; joint honorary secretary, 1922-1933
