= Australian Nursing and Midwifery Federation =

Australian union

- Australian Nursing and Midwifery Federation
- Founded: 1922; 104 years ago
- Headquarters: Melbourne, Victoria
- Location: Australia
- Members: ▲341,990 (as at 31 December 2024)
- Key people: Annie Butler, secretary
- Affiliations: ACTU
- Website: anmf.org.au

The Australian Nursing and Midwifery Federation (ANMF) is the largest trade union in Australia with over 300,000 members. The union is run by nurses, midwives and assistants in nursing/personal carers to advance the industrial, political and professional interests of the nursing and midwifery professions. ANMF is a federated union, with branches in each state and territory in Australia.

== History ==
The Victorian Trained Nurses' Association was founded in 1901 when nurses worked 52 hours per week and no qualifications were required. The Federation of state organisations was founded in 1924 (then known as the Australian Nursing Federation) and the first secretary was Evelyn Paget Evans who was also the secretary of the Australasian Trained Nurses Association and the General secretary of the Australian Physiotherapy Association (which was then called the Australian Massage Association} who also managed the Australasian Nurses' Journal. Evans believed in long hours for nurses and strikes were outlawed.

Two years prior to this, on 24 February 1922, The Trained Nurses' Guild had gained registration. This registration was opposed by other nursing organisations including The Royal Victorian Trained Nurses Association. The registration was upheld, however the Guild was not active until being amalgamated with the ANF in the late 1940s under its new name of the Australian United Nurses Association.

In 1984 Barbara Carson, who was the branch secretary in Victoria, led a successful campaign to remove a clause in the Victoria branch rules that prohibited strikes. In the following year she led a successful five-day strike against nurses being required to do non-nursing duties. Carson's successor Irene Bolger led another longer strike in 1986. In October 1986, 5,000 nurses voted at a group meeting to go on an indefinite strike. The strike lasted 50 days and resulted in an increased offer from the state of Victoria.

== Leadership ==
All of the Federal Executive and Federal Council of the ANMF are qualified nurses and/or midwives.

ANMF members are employed in a wide range of enterprises in urban, rural and remote locations in both in the public and the private sectors, including hospitals, health and community services, schools, universities, aged care, GP clinics, schools, the armed forces, statutory authorities, local government, offshore territories and industry.

== Campaigns ==
The ANMF runs campaigns for all members throughout Australia, such as its ongoing campaign to legally mandate staffing ratios for aged care.

The ANMF has a range of national policies, guidelines, and position statements on nursing, health, and social justice issues for the guidance of members in their practice and at their workplaces.

== Federal structure ==
The ANMF is federally registered. Most branches also have a state-registered union, operating as the union in the state industrial relations system. The NSW branch operates as the New South Wales Nurses and Midwives' Association; the Queensland branch operates as the Queensland Nurses and Midwives' Union.

== International representation ==
The ANMF represents Australian nursing internationally through links with other national and international nursing organisations, professional associations and the International Labour Organisations. The ANMF is a member of the Commonwealth Nurses and Midwives Federation and the South Pacific Nurses Forum and is affiliated to the Australian Council of Trade Unions, International Centre for Trade Union Rights, and APHEDA, also known as Union Aid Abroad, the overseas aid agency of the Australian trade union movement.

== See also ==
- Nurses and Midwives WA
- Margaret Anne Lyons
