= Journal of Physiotherapy =

- Discipline: Physiotherapy
- Language: English
- Edited by: Mark Elkins

Publication details
- Former name(s): Australian Journal of Physiotherapy
- History: 1954-present
- Publisher: Elsevier on behalf of the Australian Physiotherapy Association (Australia)
- Frequency: Quarterly
- Open access: Hybrid
- Impact factor: 7.000 (2020)

Standard abbreviations
- ISO 4: J. Physiother.

Indexing
- ISSN: 1836-9553
- OCLC no.: 388201287

Links
- Journal homepage; Online access; Journal page at publisher's website

The Journal of Physiotherapy is a quarterly peer-reviewed medical journal covering physiotherapy. It is published by Elsevier on behalf of the Australian Physiotherapy Association (APA). The journal was established in 1954 as (The) Australian Journal of Physiotherapy and obtained its current title in 2010. As of 2020 the editor-in-chief is Mark Elkins of the Royal Prince Alfred Hospital. Its main focuses are systematic reviews and reports of clinical trials, economic analyses, experimental studies, qualitative studies, epidemiological studies, and observational studies.

== History ==
The first issue of The Australian Journal of Physiotherapy was published in 1955, and it continued under this name until 2009. All back issues are available online. With Volume 56 beginning in 2010, the name was changed to Journal of Physiotherapy.

In January 2008, the journal was the first physiotherapy journal to conform to the ICMJE requirement that randomised trials are registered with a recognised trial registry. In January 2014 it became the first physiotherapy/physical therapy journal to make editorials and peer-reviewed original research freely available. In 2016 the APA started sponsoring Open Access publication of all of the journal's content, including all past, present and future articles. It does not charge author fees for publication.
