= Australian Physiotherapy Association =

- Abbreviation: APA
- Formation: December 1905; 120 years ago
- Founder: Teepoo Hall
- Headquarters: 1175 Toorak Road, Camberwell, Victoria Australia
- President: Scott Willis
- Website: australian.physio
- Formerly called: Australasian Massage Association

The Australian Physiotherapy Association (formerly the Australasian Massage Association) was founded by Teepoo Hall in 1905. The APA has published the Journal of Physiotherapy since 1954.

== History ==
In February 1905, the prominent physician Frederick Teepoo Hall called a meeting of scholars to call attention to the need for an organization which protected the profession of massage. By December 1905, the idea had considerable traction and Teepoo Hall convened a special meeting to form the Australasian Massage Association (AMA) with the purpose of establishing massage as a professional field. Sir Thomas Anderson Stuart was the association's first president.

The first paid secretary, Evelyn Paget Evans, of the Australasian Trained Nurses Association also became the General secretary of this Association (which was then called the Australian Massage Association) in 1917. Evans served as the secretary until 1956.

== Activities ==
The first formal field of study for physiotherapy was developed by the AMA, and was approved by Federal Council in May 1906. During World War I and World War II, physical therapy and massage as a field became in much higher demand, and the term physiotherapy became more well known.

At the Second National Physiotherapy Congress in 1939, a decision was made to rename the organization as the Australian Physiotherapy Association. The APA began publishing Australian Journal of Physiotherapy (which was later renamed the Journal of Physiotherapy) in 1954. In August 1962 Queen Elizabeth II granted royal patronage to the APA.
