= Warwick Court House =

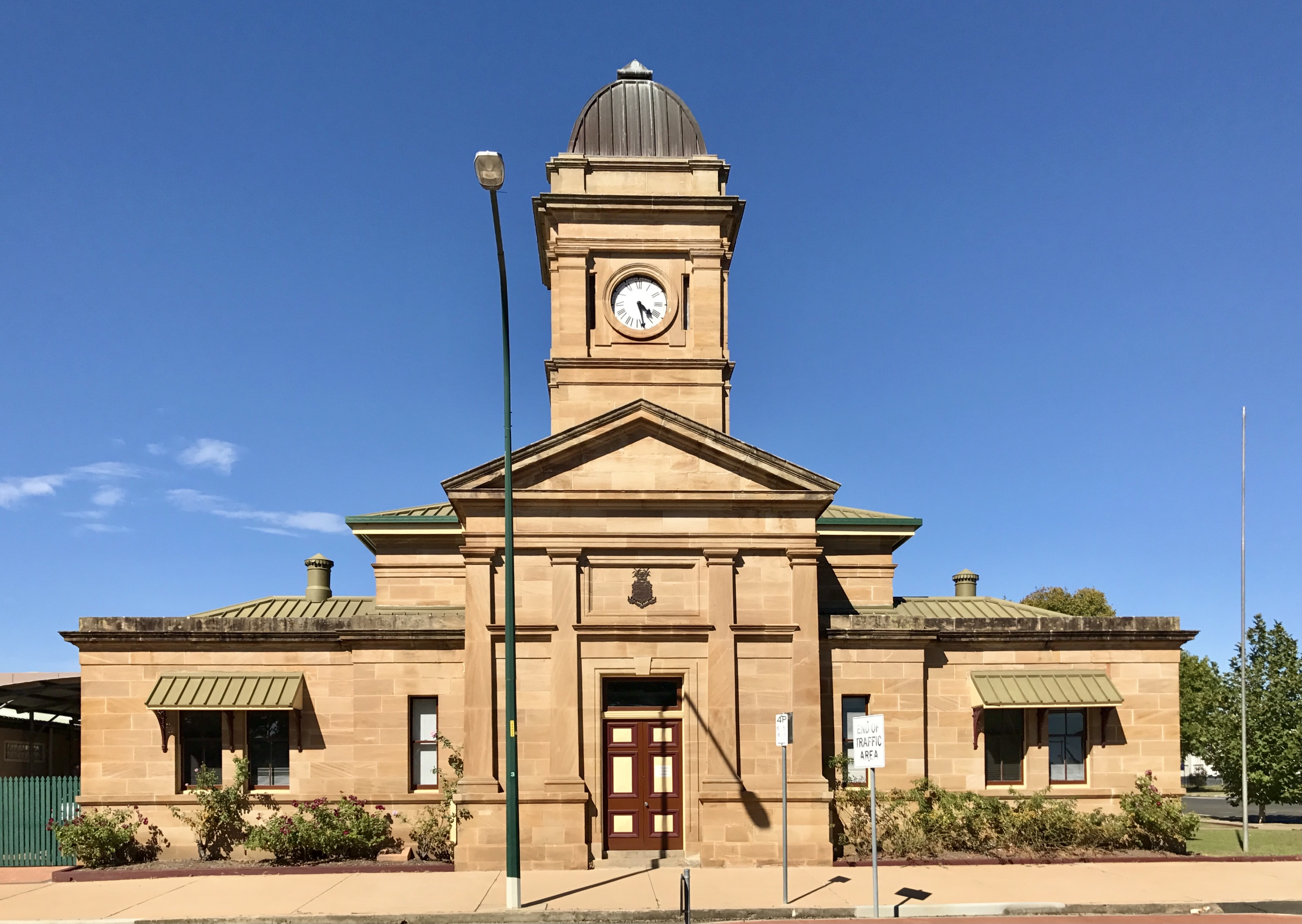
- Warwick Court House, 2017

- Location within Queensland Location within Australia
- 28.2143°S 152.0312°E
- Location: 88 Fitzroy Street, Warwick, Southern Downs Region, Queensland, Australia

History
- Design period: 1870s–1890s (late 19th century)
- Built: 1885–1914

Site notes
- Architect(s): John James Clark, Alfred Barton Brady

Queensland Heritage Register
- Official name: Warwick Court House and Police Complex
- Type: state heritage (built)
- Designated: 21 October 1992
- Reference no.: 600948
- Significant period: 1880s (historical); 1885 ongoing (social); 1885–1914 (fabric ct hse); 1890s (fabric lockup); 1899–19
- Significant components: police station, residential accommodation – lock-up keeper's house/quarters, court house, residential accommodation – police sergeant's house/quarters, barracks – police, roof/ridge ventilator/s / fleche/s, tower – clock, lock-up, out building/s
- Builders: William G Conley, J Ledbury, John Longwill

Warwick Court House and Police Complex is a heritage-listed courthouse at 88 Fitzroy Street, Warwick, Southern Downs Region, Queensland, Australia. It was designed by John James Clark and built from 1885 to 1914 by William G Conley. It was added to the Queensland Heritage Register on 21 October 1992.

== History ==
The Warwick Court House and Police Complex comprises a group of timber and stone buildings erected from 1885. The town of Warwick was gazetted in 1847, and a police unit is recorded as being established in Warwick from this time. A shepherd's hut on Canning Downs is believed to have been used as the first police station and barracks. In 1850 a township was laid out, and allotments auctioned. Warwick was incorporated as a municipality (the Borough of Warwick) in 1861. Indications are that Albion Street was the main centre of Warwick during the early development of the town. A reserve was set aside in Albion Street, and public buildings erected on this site included a court house (1862) and police station, post office (late 1860s) and telegraph office (front portion of the court house, erected 1875).

=== Court house ===
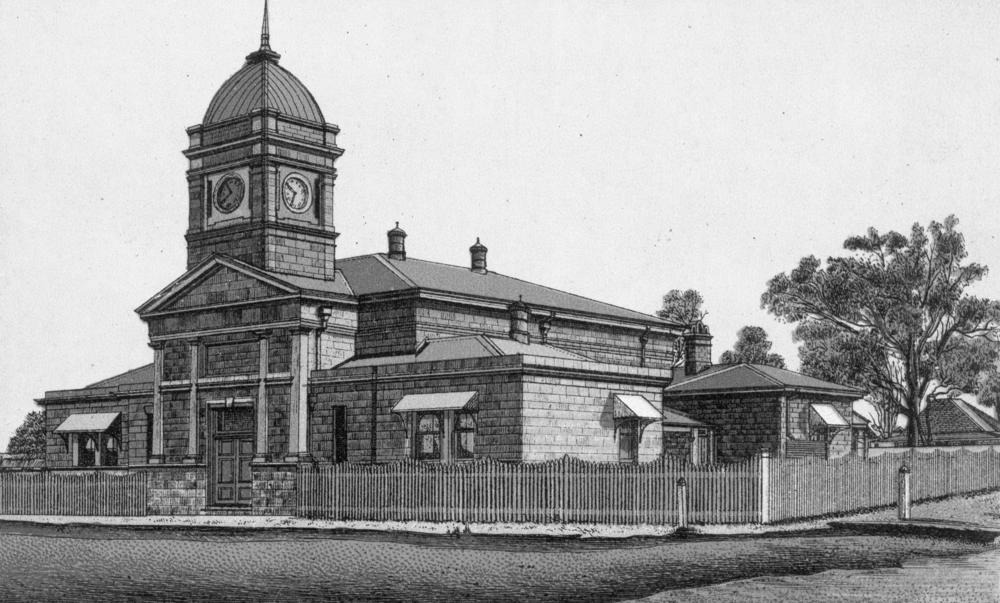
Warwick Court House, circa 1887

The Albion Street site was prone to flooding from the Condamine River, and by the mid-1880s plans had been prepared for a new court house on an allotment purchased from Frederick Hudson, at the southeast corner of Fitzroy and Guy Streets.

The design for the court house was prepared by the Department of Works, John James Clark being Queensland Colonial Architect at the time. The contract price for the building was just over £3700. The contractor for the building was William G Conley, and John McCullough completed the stonework on the building.

The decision to incorporate a clock tower at the front of the building was made during construction, and the clock was supplied by Messrs Flavelle Brothers and Roberts. A public clock appears to have been long sought after by Warwick citizens.

By late 1887, a shed and stables were needed; these were erected shortly after.

During the early years of use, the court house proved to be drafty and have poor acoustics, these problems being attributed to the "over-ventilation" of the court house through "superfluous" openings in the ceiling. Various measures were undertaken to overcome these problems, including capping the roof ventilators. A false ceiling was eventually added to the court room to reduce the volume of the space.

A brick strong room was erected at the rear of the court house in 1880. This building is now used as a storeroom.

Consistent with its public function, the court house has also provided offices for government agencies including Land Agent, the Labour Bureau and various Registrars and Inspectors, for example, the Inspector of Factories and Shops. Part of the rear verandah was enclosed and extended in 1914 to provide additional office space.

Alterations to the building have been undertaken from the 1960s, including the formation of a public entry/waiting area by enclosing the western verandah, and the rearrangement of office spaces within the building.

=== Former Timber Lock-Up (1892) / Former Acting Sergeant's Residence ===
The difficulties associated with separate sites for court house and lock-up became apparent following the erection of the court house in 1886. For example, prisoners had to be escorted through the streets to the court house; a situation which was regarded as highly undesirable. Sketch plans indicating the placement of a new lock-up on the court house site were prepared in the late 1880s.

Tenders were called in November 1891 for a "new Police Station in the court house yard", the contract of J Ledbury being accepted in December that year. The contract price was £415, and the building which included 3 cells and living quarters, was generally referred to as the lock-up/lock-up keeper's quarters. Contemporary newspaper reports indicate that the building was completed by the end of April 1892.

With the completion of a new stone police station on the adjoining land in 1901, consideration was given to the future use of the timber lockup; the options for which included sale of the building, or its removal to another district where a police station was required. The matter appears to have been settled in December 1900 when it was decided that it was "...a first rate building in excellent repair, and will make good quarters for a married Sub Officer...". The building has provided residential accommodation for police officers from this time.

Records indicate that in September 1903 it was recommended that the old cells be pulled down and stacked, ready for removal to other areas. It is assumed that the cells referred to, were those erected as part of the timber lock-up.

Evidence suggests that this building, originally in a U-shaped form combining living quarters and cells, is one of few remaining buildings of this type erected during late nineteenth century.

=== Police Buildings ===
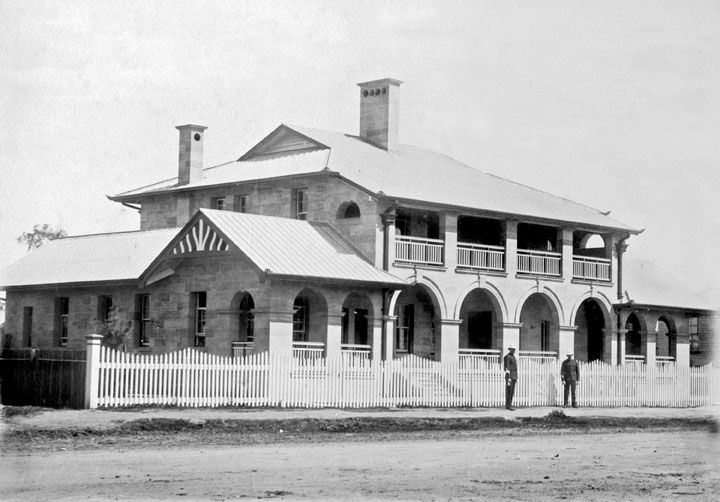
Police Station Warwick, circa 1890

By the late 1890s, accommodation at the police station in Albion Street was described as "...very indifferent...", and it was suggested that the old post office premises, (a new post office having been erected in Palmerin Street in 1898) be handed over to the police department to be made part of the station. The former telegraph and post office buildings were quite dilapidated by this time, and would have required major repairs to make them fit for habitation. As the town had extended in a south west direction, Albion Street was no longer as central, and attention turned to the allotment in Fitzroy Street adjoining the court house and timber lockup, as the site for a new police station.

Plans were prepared for the new building late in 1899 by the Department of Public Works, Alfred Barton Brady being the Government Architect at the time. The contract for the new stone police station was let to John Longwill of Warwick, at a price of just over £5700.

The final inspection of the new buildings was carried out in July 1901 by Thomas Pye, District Architect - Southern Division, who reported that "...The work has been carried out well, and the buildings as completed have a good and substantial appearance...". The new stone building provided office and residential accommodation, which included barracks and officer's quarters. Five new cells and a new lock-up keeper's residence, both of stone construction, and stables were also completed at this time.

Problems with the settlement of the foundations of the police station building required repairs throughout the early 1900s, including underpinning in 1908, insertion of tie rods in 1910 and bolting the walls in 1913.

During the 1940s an Air Raid Shelter was erected at the police station, which was converted into a police garage following the Second World War. Also around this time, the police stables were converted into a garage then Public Works Depot. These buildings have since been demolished.

Warwick Police District was created in the mid-1950s, the headquarters being at Warwick. It is likely that it was at this time the building ceased to be used for residential accommodation, with houses for police quarters being acquired elsewhere in Warwick. The building was rearranged to include an office for the district inspector and staff. An inspection of the station in 1971 found the buildings generally in poor condition, and there was some indication that plans for a new station were being prepared, although did not eventuate.

A new district office was erected at the police station c. 1990, and the station building was renovated c. 1992.

== Description ==
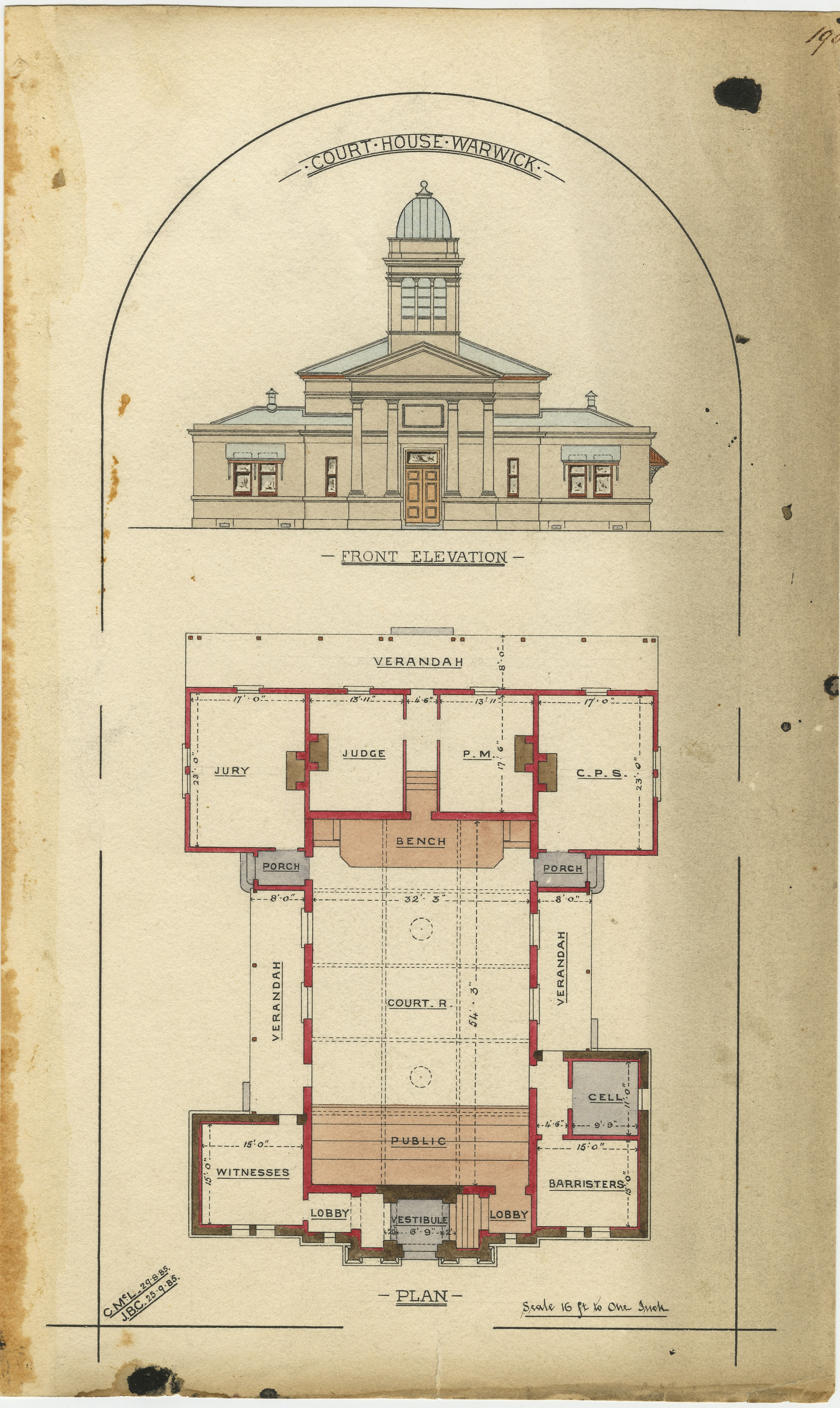
Architectural drawing of the court house, 1885

The Warwick Court House and Police Complex fronts Fitzroy Street to the north and is bounded by Guy Street to the west and Haig Avenue to the east. The complex consists of the court house, police station, lock-up, former lock-up keeper's residence, former acting sergeant's residence and service buildings.

=== Court house ===
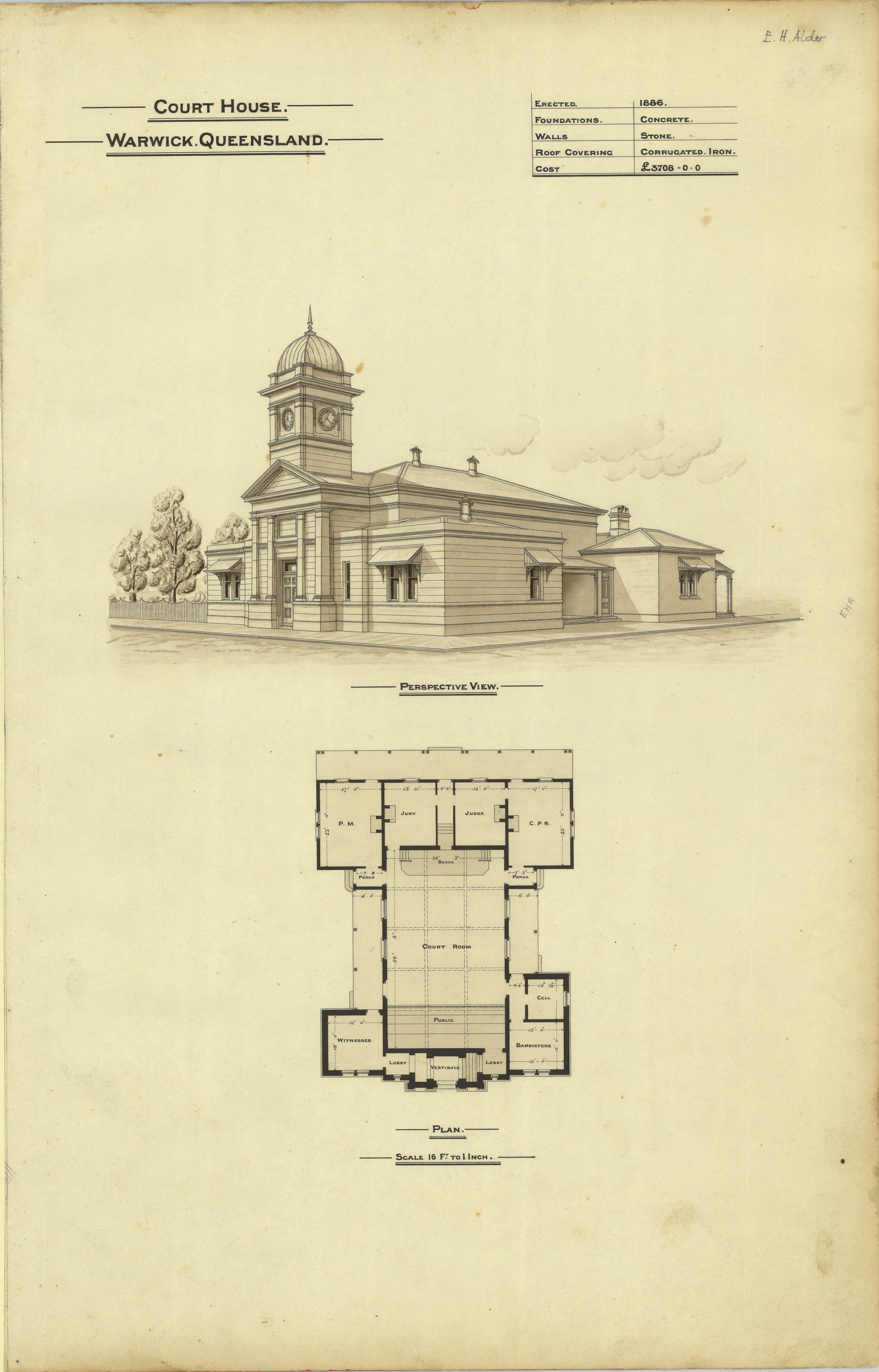
Perspective view of the court house, 1888

The court house is a single-storeyed (with attic) sandstone structure located on the corner of Guy Street fronting Fitzroy Street to the north. The building has a hipped sheet metal roof, with metal ridge ventilators, and a clock tower on the Fitzroy Street frontage.

The symmetrical Fitzroy Street facade, of dressed sandstone, is stepped in plan with the central clock tower and pedimented entrance abutting the footpath. The pediment is supported by four pilasters resting on a deep base framing an entrance. The entrance has double timber panelled doors with fanlight surrounded by a sandstone moulding and keystone. A deep string course crosses above the entrance between the pilasters at eave height, with a metal coat of arms positioned centrally above. The clock tower is square in plan with a clock face, surrounded by sandstone mouldings and framed by pilasters with a deep cornice above, to each side and a convex hipped sheet metal roof. The lower wings either side of the tower have parapet walls and continue the eave height string course and top ledge of the sandstone base. The rear of the structure is of rough faced sandstone. Windows are mainly timber sashes and have sheet metal hoods with cast iron brackets.

The building is H-shaped in plan, with the taller court room forming the main section of the building with lower offices and service rooms forming the cross wings at either end. The court room has verandahs on either side, with the western side having been enclosed to form the main entry fronting Guy Street and the eastern having steel posts. High level windows above the verandah roof on the west light the attic space which was formerly a gallery level.

Internally, the building has been refitted a number of times. Walls are rendered and ceilings are mainly of hardboard. Some painted timber fireplace surrounds remain, as do some panelled timber doors with glass fanlights. A strong room, now used for storage, retains the original steel door. The attic space, originally a gallery level and now accessed by a steep timber stair, has a coffered, boarded timber ceiling which now supports a curved, suspended ceiling to the court room below.

=== Police Station ===
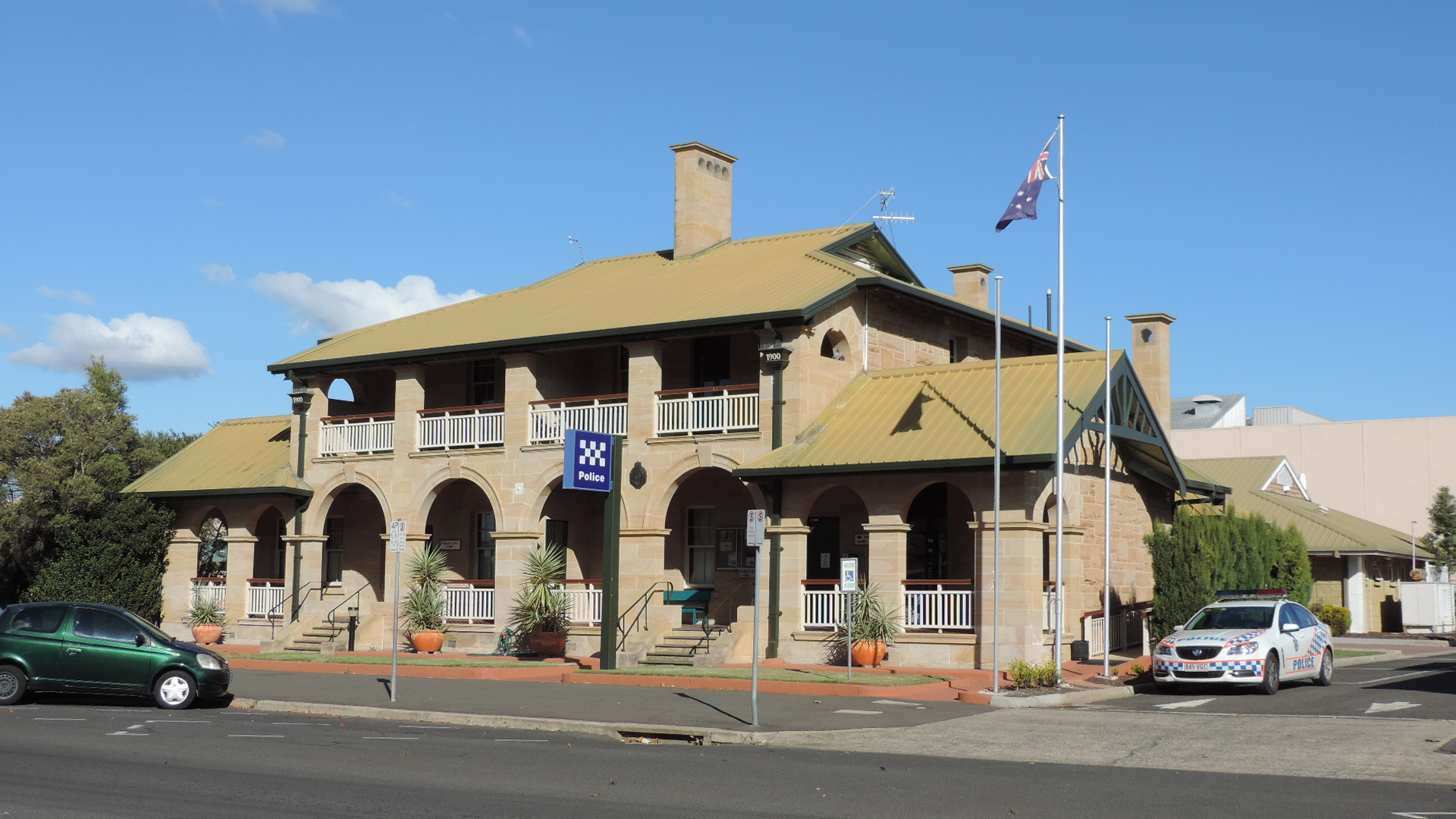
Warwick Police Station, 2015

The police station is a two-storeyed sandstone structure fronting Fitzroy Street to the north. The building has a gable and half-gable sheet metal roof, with dressed sandstone street facade, chimney stacks and quoining to the side and rear with square-snecked rock-faced ashlar. The chimney stacks are capped by a cornice and have circular openings on the vertical face. The symmetrical street facade has an arched sandstone arcade to the ground floor, consisting of four central arched bays supporting a verandah to the first floor, with two smaller arched bays on either side. A central stone wall divides the verandah and arcade, reflecting the original function of the building, with a set of stone entrance steps to each of the end central bays. The arches have pronounced extrados, imposts and keystones, and the verandah has timber batten balustrade and French doors with fanlights. Downpipe heads have the year 1900 in relief, gables have decorative timber panels and windows are timber sashes. A section of verandah is located at the rear on the ground floor, and a single-storeyed masonry toilet wing has been added to the southwest corner. Tie rods have been inserted through the building in various places.

Internally, the police station has recently been refitted. Twin entrances each lead into a hall containing a staircase with timber balustrade. Rooms retain timber doors, architraves and skirtings, boarded ceilings and some timber fireplace surrounds. Walls are rendered and large pendant lighting has been installed in every room.

=== Lock-Up ===
The lock-up, located to the southwest of the police station, is a single-storeyed sandstone structure with a corrugated iron gable roof with central ridge ventilator and a verandah on the western side. The building, consisting of five cells, has dressed sandstone quoining with rock-faced ashlar. Each cell has a steel door, corner toilet, corner security camera and rendered walls, with the southern cell being originally a padded cell. The verandah has been enclosed with steel mesh to create larger cell areas. A shower building is located to the southwest of the cell block and consists of a timber structure with a corrugated iron gable roof and concrete floor. The lock-up compound is surrounded by a timber framed corrugated iron fence, the top of which is serrated.

=== Former Lock-Up Keeper's Residence ===
The former lock-up keeper's residence, to the south of the court house, is located adjoining the lock-up and fronting Guy Street to the west. The building, U-shaped in plan, is a single-storeyed sandstone structure with dressed chimney stacks and quoining with vermiculated ashlar. The chimney stacks are capped by a cornice and have circular openings on the vertical face. The hipped corrugated iron roof extends over verandahs on the north and west, which have been enclosed with chamferboard, hardboard and a variety of windows. A small verandah located within the U on the east has also been enclosed.

Internally, the building is one room deep and consists of one large central room with a room opening to either side, enclosed verandahs west and north, and two rear rooms with a small enclosed verandah between. The sandstone walls have been painted to the enclosed verandah sides, and rendered to the room interiors. French doors with fanlights open to verandahs, windows are timber sashes and ceilings are boarded.

=== Former Acting Sergeant's Residence ===
The former acting sergeant's residence is located between the police station and court house fronting Fitzroy Street to the north. The single-storeyed chamferboard building is L-shaped in plan and has a corrugated iron gable roof with a hipped rear wing and two metal ridge ventilators. Evidence of an early second rear wing is apparent in the joins of the corrugated iron. The building has timber stumps with battens between, and verandahs on the north and south have been enclosed with chamferboard and a variety of windows. Most windows are timber sashes and have corrugated iron and timber batten hoods on the east and west.

Internally, the building is one room deep and consists of one large central room with a room opening to either side, enclosed verandahs front and rear, and a rear wing of two rooms. Verandahs have single- skin exposed framed timber walls and French doors with fanlights, and rooms have boarded ceilings.

=== Service Buildings ===
The service buildings consist of two toilets and a store. The toilets, one located to the north of the lock-up, and one to the north of the former lock-up keeper's residence, are single room sandstone structures with rock-faced ashlar and a corrugated iron gable roof. The store, located to the north of the former lock-up keeper's residence, is a single room rendered masonry structure with a curved corrugated iron roof and steel door.

== Heritage listing ==
Warwick Court House and Police Complex was listed on the Queensland Heritage Register on 21 October 1992 having satisfied the following criteria.

The place is important in demonstrating the evolution or pattern of Queensland's history.

The Warwick Court House and Police Complex survives as evidence of the consolidation of Warwick as a centre for the surrounding district during the late nineteenth and early twentieth centuries.

The place is important in demonstrating the principal characteristics of a particular class of cultural places.

It is a highly intact working example of a turn of the century police complex with adjoining late nineteenth century court house.

The place is important because of its aesthetic significance.

Through the use of materials (in particular the local sandstone) architectural forms and scale, the complex is a significant element within the Warwick townscape and identifies with other major public sandstone buildings.

The place has a strong or special association with a particular community or cultural group for social, cultural or spiritual reasons.

The complex, which has evolved on this site from 1885 maintains a strong association with the Warwick community and continues to provide a focus for policing and administration of justice, and other administrative functions.

The place has a special association with the life or work of a particular person, group or organisation of importance in Queensland's history.

The complex, which has evolved on this site from 1885 continues to provide a focus for policing and administration of justice, and other administrative functions.
