= Queensland Government Architect =

Public service position in Queensland, Australia

The Queensland Government Architect is a position within the public service of Queensland, Australia with responsibility for the design of government buildings in Queensland. It was formerly known as the Queensland Colonial Architect. The position is located within the Queensland Department of Housing and Public Works.

== List of Colonial Architects in Queensland ==
- Charles Tiffin, appointed in December 1859.
- Francis Drummond Greville Stanley, appointed in July 1873
- John James Clark, appointed in July 1883
- George St Paul Connolly, appointed acting Colonial Architect in December 1885 following the resignation of John James Clark, appointed Colonial Architect in July 1886 but backdated to January 1886, a position he held until the government abolished the position in July 1891
- Alfred Barton Brady, the Engineer for Bridges and Inspector of Divisional Board Works assumed the responsibilities (but not the title) of Colonial Architect in July 1891, but in September 1891 it was announced that his title would become Engineer for Bridges and Supervising Architect although he was frequently referred to as the Colonial Architect in newspaper reporting Brady retired in 1922.

== List of Queensland Government Architects ==
- Andrew Baxter Leven, appointed 1927, retired February 1951
- Michael Keniger 1999 to 2006
- Philip Follent 2008 to 2011
- Malcolm Middleton, appointed July 2011
- Leah Lang, appointed 2021

== Notable staff ==
Other staff employed within the office of the Queensland Government Architect include:

- Raymond Clare Nowland
- John Smith Murdoch
