= Gobe =

Gobe may refer to:

- Gobè, an arrondissement in Zou, Benin
- Gobe, Corisco, the largest settlement on Corisco, Equatorial Guinea
- "Gobe" (song), a 2013 single by Nigerian singer Davido
- Gobe Software (1997–2010), a software company
- Great Ordovician Biodiversification Event, an evolutionary radiation of animal life throughout the Ordovician period
- Glenda Gobe, Australian molecular biologist
- Góbé Hungarian world music formation
