= Diamantina Bowen =

Wife of Governor of Queensland (1832-1893)

Contessa Lady Bowen
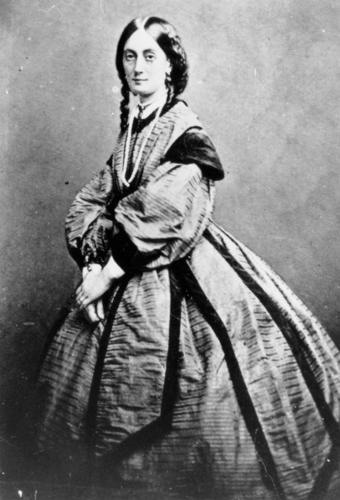
- The Lady Bowen

Spouse of the Governor of Hong Kong
- In office 30 March 1883 – 6 October 1887
- Governor: Sir George Bowen
- Preceded by: Catherine Hennessy
- Succeeded by: Marion Des Vœux

Personal details
- Born: Diamantina di Roma; 1832/1833 Ionian Islands
- Died: 1893 (aged 60) London, England
- Resting place: Kensal Green Cemetery
- Spouse: George Bowen (m. 1856)
- Children: 6

Diamantina, Lady Bowen (née di Roma; c. 1832/1833–1893), was a noble from the formerly Venetian Ionian Islands who became the wife of Sir George Bowen, the first Governor of Queensland.

== Personal life ==
The Contessa Diamantina di Roma was born in 1832 or 1833 in the United States of the Ionian Islands, then a British protectorate, today in Greece. Her place of birth was either Zante (Zakynthos), Corfu, or Ithaca.

Her parents were Count Giorgio-Candiano Roma and his wife Countess Orsola, née di Balsamo. Diamantina was the tenth of their eleven children. Her aristocratic family were descended from the Venetians who had settled in the Ionian Islands for centuries as part of the Stato da Màr. Her father was the President of the Ionian Senate (1850–1856), titular Head of State of the United States of the Ionian Islands. He was also appointed a Poet Laureate by Queen Victoria.

With her family, Diamantina had a privileged upbringing and was familiar with the workings of government, politics and diplomacy.

On 28 April 1856 at the Palace of St Michael and St George in Corfu, Diamantina married Sir George Bowen, an Ulsterman who was political secretary of the British Protectorate, and a former Rector of the Ionian Academy.

Their first two children were born in the Ionian Islands. Their first child, a son, died twelve days old. Their second child, a daughter, was born on 17 August 1858 and was called Adelaide Diamantina Bowen, but was known as Nina.

After their move to Brisbane, they had three more children there:

- Zoe Caroline Bowen, born 28 August 1860 at Adelaide House (the temporary Government House)
- Agnes Herbert Bowen, born 26 July 1862 at Government House
- George William Howard Bowen, born 9 April 1864 at Government House

A final daughter, Alfreda Ernestina Albertina Bowen, was born on 10 April 1869 at Government House, Auckland, New Zealand.

Diamantina was described as "pretty" but tempered perhaps by the remark "her beauty being in her expression rather than her features". She was described as "slender but graceful".

She could play the piano and sing well, even with previously unseen pieces of music.

Living most of her life in English-speaking countries, Diamantina spoke English well but with a slight accent. Although she spoke in English in public, it was claimed she spoke with her husband at home in Italian, her mother tongue. Diamantina was frequently described as "softly spoken".

Her husband's career took the family all over the world, as governor postings were typically for five years. We do not know how Diamantina felt about this frequent upheaval, but she cried copiously as the family departed from Brisbane, suggesting that she had had many close personal connections while there.

Her daughter Nina married Allan Campbell, a Queensland grazier.

Eventually the couple retired to London, England in 1883 accompanied by their two unmarried daughters.

Diamantina worshipped in the Greek Orthodox church during retirement in London, suggesting she maintained her connection to her religious roots throughout her life, despite so many years spent in British colonies.

Diamantina died at Bethnal Green, London, England on 17 November 1893 from acute bronchitis. She is buried in Kensal Green cemetery in London.

Her son George William Howard Bowen married Gertrude Chamberlain (daughter of Richard Chamberlain and niece of Joseph Chamberlain, Colonial Secretary) on 16 January 1896 in Holy Trinity Church, Sloane Street, London, England. His sister Alfreda was a bridesmaid.

Her daughter Alfreda married Robert Lydston Newman in October 1899 at St George's Church, Hanover Square, London, England. Her brother George gave Alfreda away (her father having died earlier that year).

A sculpture of Diamantina was created by sculptor Phillip Piperides in 1989 for the Greek Community Centre, South Brisbane, Queensland. In June 2009, it was moved to Old Government House at Queensland University of Technology.

== Public life in Queensland ==
George, Diamantina and their sixteen-month-old daughter Nina arrived in Brisbane on Saturday 10 December 1859 on board The Cordelia. As they stepped off their vessel at a landing stage at the Brisbane Botanic Gardens at Gardens Point, they were welcomed by a huge crowd of over 4000 people waving flags, both the British Union Jack and the Greek flag. The arrival of the first governor and his family had been eagerly expected a few days earlier, but adverse winds had delayed their trip up from Sydney and so when the news came late on Friday that their vessel was seen entering Moreton Bay, the excitement reached enormous heights. As well as residents of Brisbane, many of those present had travelled from other parts of Queensland to welcome the incoming governor. There was a 21-gun salute as they landed, there was a triumphal arch, fireworks and all manner of proclamations, speeches and celebrations, over a number of days.

Being the first Governor, there was not yet an official residence for the Governor and so they lived in Adelaide House (now The Deanery of St John's Cathedral) which was leased for three years.

Diamantina participated in the public life in Queensland in a number of ways:

- as wife of the Governor
- to the social tone of Brisbane through her sense of style, education and accomplishments
- to charity through her active patronage

Being still a prosperous but pioneer community on her arrival, Diamantina's dinner parties soon became a feature of the social scene and she is credited with raising the tone of Brisbane society.

Meanwhile, the official residence (now Old Government House) was being constructed and the family moved into the house in April 1862. It was an elegant and spacious building, constructed of sandstone and Brisbane tuff (sometimes incorrectly referred to as porphyry), in the Classic Revival style. Its grounds were surrounded by thirty acres (twelve hectares) of riverbank land, including the Brisbane City Botanic Gardens which were commenced at the same time under the supervision of Walter Hill. Diamantina personally supervised the layout of the gardens of the house, which included lawns, tennis courts as well as flower and vegetable gardens. On 16 June 1862, the couple hosted the first ball in the new building, celebrating Queen Victoria's birthday.

In 1864 at Ipswich, Queensland, Diamantina turned the first sod for Queensland's first railway-line between Ipswich and Bigge's Camp (later Grandchester) using with a silver spade and a cedar wheelbarrow.

Diamantina was involved in establishing the first Sunday School for children.

Diamantina was concerned about social welfare in Brisbane and was an active patroness of a group of local ladies who established the Lady Bowen Lying-In Hospital, Brisbane's first maternity hospital, the fore-runner of the present Royal Brisbane Women's Hospital.

== Named in her honour ==
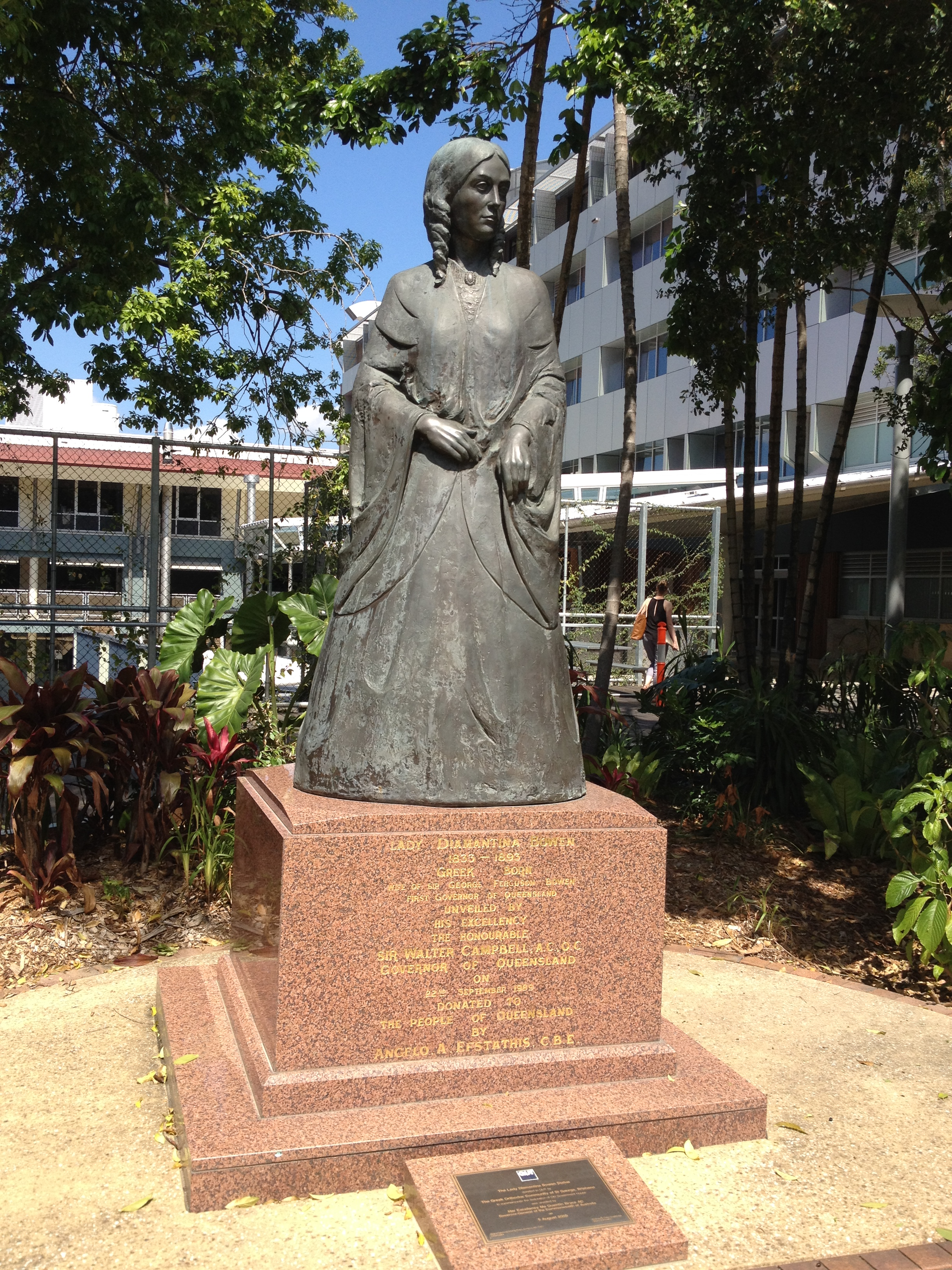
Statue of Lady Diamantina Bowen, beside Old Government House, Brisbane, 2013

Diamantina was very popular in Queensland and many places were named after her:

- The town of Roma, Queensland
- Roma Street, Brisbane and consequently
  - Roma Street railway station
  - Roma Street busway station
  - Roma Street Parklands
- Diamantina River, Queensland
- Shire of Diamantina, a Local Government Area in Queensland
- Mount Diamantina
- Diamantina Island near Gladstone, Queensland
- the iron paddle-wheeler Diamantina built for the A.S.N. company
- Diamantina Orphanage, established in 1883 in Brisbane
- Diamantina Hospital for Chronic Diseases, which was established in 1901 on the site of the Diamantina Orphanage and was later replaced by the Princess Alexandra Hospital
- Brisbane Diamantina Health Partners, an Academic Health Science System formed in 2014 and based on the Princess Alexandra Hospital campus
- The University of Queensland Diamantina Institute ("Frazer Institute" since 2022), the sixth research Institute of the University of Queensland, based at the Princess Alexandra Hospital, Brisbane
- Diamantina Health Care Museum, established 2004 in the only remaining building of the Diamantina Hospital
- Lady Bowen Hospital, Brisbane's first maternity hospital, the forerunner of the Royal Brisbane and Women's Hospital
- Lady Bowen Falls, at Milford Sound in Fiordland, New Zealand
- Ithaca Creek intended to be named after her birthplace, one of the Ionian islands.

In 1898, a statue of Lady Bowen was commissioned by Angelo Efstathis for the Greek Community Centre in South Brisbane, and sculpted by Brisbane artist Peter Piperides. When Old Government House was re-opened on 5 August 2009, after restoration by Queensland University of Technology, the statue was relocated to the western lawn of Old Government House, the western side of the house being the "female" side.

== See also ==
Much of Diamantina's life was dictated by the career of her husband Sir George Bowen as a colonial administrator and a more complete understanding of her life can be obtained by reading about his life.
