= Royal District Nursing Service (South Australia) =

Nonprofit organization based in Adelaide, South Australia

RDNS
- Type: Charity
- Industry: Nursing/Healthcare
- Founded: 1894
- Headquarters: Keswick, South Australia, Adelaide, Australia
- Website: www.silverchain.org.au/sa/

The Royal District Nursing Service (RDNS) is a not-for-profit community health and care provider with headquarters in Keswick, a suburb of Adelaide, South Australia. It has progressed through a series of iterations:

It was established in 1894 in South Australia as the District Trained Nursing Society (DTNS).
In 1937 District and Bush Nursing Society of South Australia
In 1965 Royal District and Bush Nursing Society of South Australia
In 1973 Royal District Nursing Society of South Australia.
In 1993 Royal District Nursing Service of SA.
In 2011 the organisation merged with Silver Chain Group, and is now known as RDNS Silverchain in South Australia and Silverchain throughout the rest of Australia.

== History ==
RDNS Logo until 2010

Bush District Nurse

The Royal District Nursing Society of South Australia was founded by Bishop Kennion on 12 July 1894 as the District Trained Nursing Society (D.T.N.S.), following 12 months work by a trained nurse, named McLellan, in the Adelaide suburb of Bowden. This experiment, which was supported by the Anglican Church and financed by the philanthropic Barr Smith and Elder families, convinced founders, Dr Allan Campbell, Rev. B. C. Stephenson (Note: Bryant Charles Stephenson died in 1894 — "a dying man ministering to dying men and women")) and Nightingale nurse Matron Edith Noble, of the local demand for a district nursing service. Meanwhile, the financial viability of such a venture was being demonstrated by the Pirie Street Nursing Sisters' Association, which was organised by the inner-city Pirie Street Wesleyan Methodist Church but supported by public donations. Founder Rev. Joseph Berry was on the inaugural committee of the D.T.N.S., although his Pirie Street Nursing Sisters' Association remained independent until 1898.

The second nurse appointed was Dora Sweetapple. In her first full year she was paid £30 with £55 for expenses. She took care of over 150 patients making 1612 visits to see them, taking advantage of free bus rides, a bicycle and a ferry crossing.

In 1912 Boer War hero Martha Sarah Bidmead RRC became the service's superintendent.

Subsequently, in 1937, the D.T.N.S. was renamed the District and Bush Nursing Society of S.A. Inc.; in 1965 the 'Royal' prefix was granted and in 1973 'Bush' was removed from the title.

In 1993 its name changed to Royal District Nursing Service of SA.

In September 2011, RDNS merged with the Silver Chain Nursing Association of Western Australia. Due to the strong history of RDNS within South Australia, the RDNS name and branding continues to be used within that State.

Presidents

- 1894–1899 Dr Allan Campbell
- 1899–1934 Dr Alfred Austin Lendon ( – 1935)
- 1934– S. C. Forgan (a.k.a. Mrs S. B. Forgan)

== Locations ==
RDNS provides care within local communities and as such has bases located throughout Adelaide.

== See also ==
- Australasian Trained Nurses' Association
- Royal District Nursing Service (Victoria)
