= Doris Bardsley =

UK born Australian nurse (1895–1968)

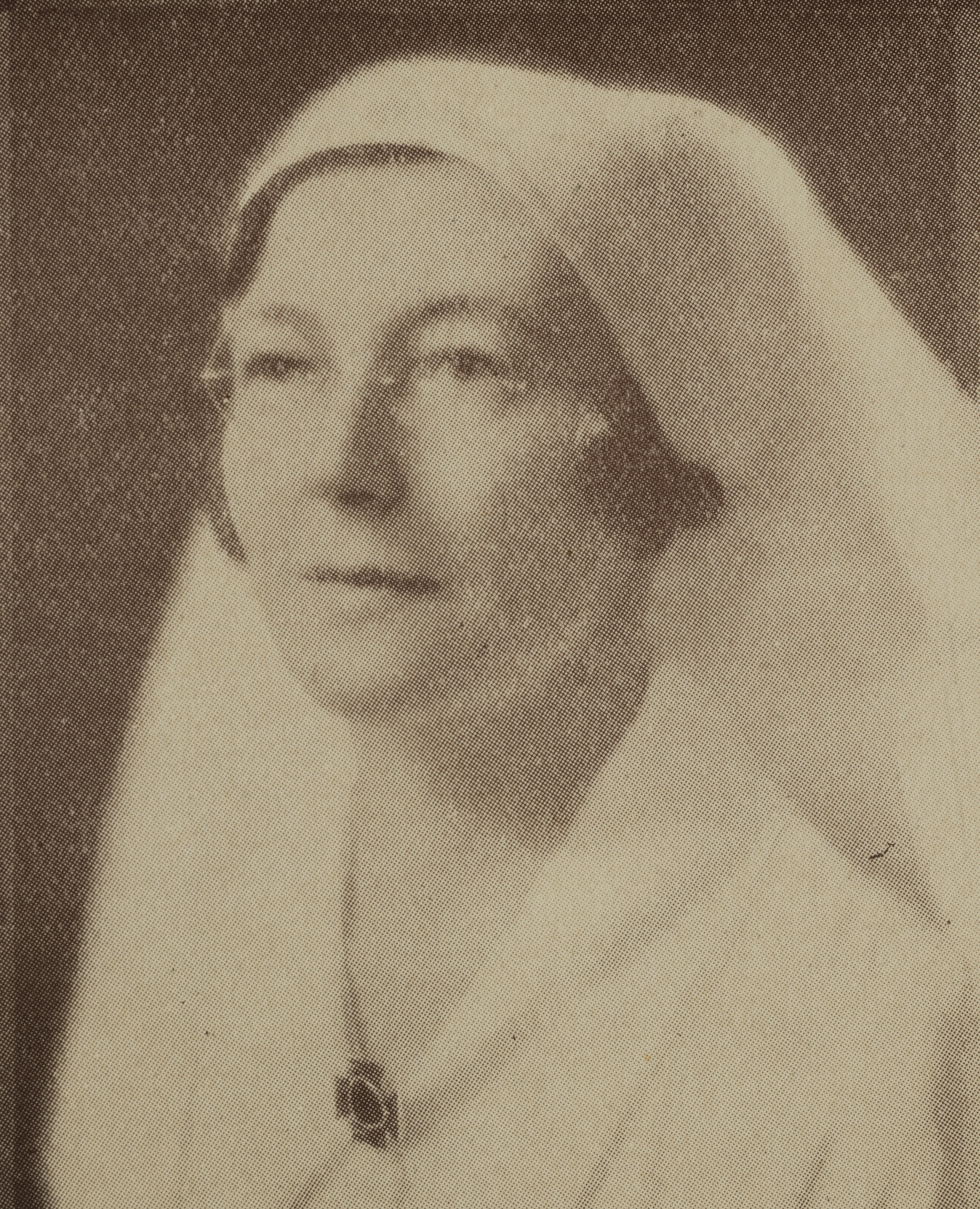
- Born: 9 April 1895; Gorton
- Died: 21 January 1968 (aged 72); Mosman
- Occupation: nurse

Doris Bardsley (9 April 1895 – 21 January 1968) was a UK-born leading Australian nurse. She began work in Brisbane at the Diamantina Hospital for Chronic Diseases and rose to lead the Australasian Trained Nurses' Association.

== Life ==
Bardsley was born in England at Gorton in 1895. Her parents were Arabella (born Whincup) and Joseph William Bardsley. Her father sold tea and she was educated in Liverpool at Lister Drive School. Before the start of World War One she and her family emigrated to Australia where they made their new home in Brisbane at Coorparoo. She started work locally as a nurse at the Diamantina Hospital for Chronic Diseases.

In 1923 Ellen Barron opened the first training school in child welfare nursing in Brisbane. Bardsley was on this course at Diamantina Hospital. By 1925 she was the sister-in-charge of the government's baby clinics in Queensland. During her twelve years in that role she was a delegate to the state's National Council of Women. The number of clinics expanded and in 1937 she became the acting infant welfare superintendent. The International Council of Nurses met in London in 1937 and she was the delegate. In 1939 she was confirmed as the superintendent of infant welfare.

In 1951 Bardsley became the President of the Australasian Trained Nurses' Association (later the Royal Australian Nursing Federation) even though she was already her state's president. The International Council of Nurses met in Brazil and Turkey in 1953 and 1955 and Bardsley was again the Australian delegate. In 1957 she addressed the New South Wales College of Nursing with a speech called "New Lamps for Old" which was later published.

Bardsley worked for the Queensland's Department of Health and Home Affairs in 1953 until she retired in 1961. She died in 1968 in the suburb of Sydney called Mosman.

Bardsley was the maternal aunt of Australian musicologist Roger Covell.
