= Old Government House, Brisbane =

Australian classical revival building

Old Government House
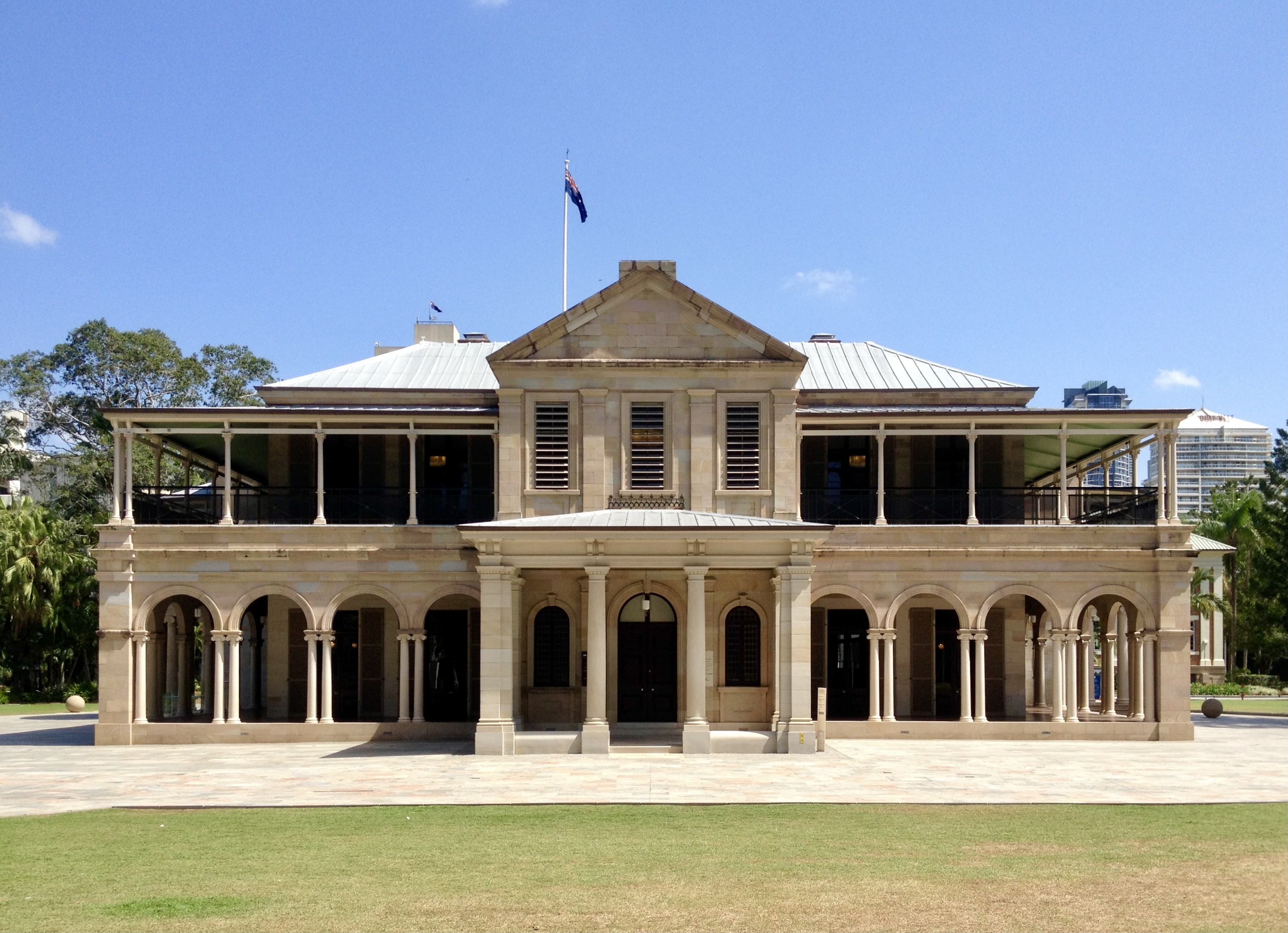
- Front facade view
- Interactive map of the Old Government House area
- Former names: Government House

General information
- Architectural style: Classical revival
- Location: Brisbane, Queensland, 2 George Street, Brisbane City
- Coordinates: 27.4773°S 153.0291°E
- Current tenants: Queensland University of Technology
- Construction started: 1860
- Completed: 1862
- Owner: Queensland Government

Technical details
- Floor count: 2

Design and construction
- Architect: Charles Tiffin
- Main contractor: Joshua Jeays

Queensland's first Government House is located at Gardens Point in the grounds of the Queensland University of Technology at the end of George Street in Brisbane, Queensland, Australia. The building's construction was the first important architectural work undertaken by the newly formed Government of Queensland. It is listed on the Queensland Heritage Register.

== Residence of the Queensland governor ==
=== Architecture and construction ===
The government residential building was constructed to accommodate the first Governor of Queensland, Sir George Bowen, and his family. On 22 May 1860, the first Queensland parliament met. One month later a vote to fund a new government house was successful. The site chosen for the building was a high point of Gardens Point overlooking the Brisbane Botanic Gardens and with expansive vistas of the Brisbane River. There was an issue with the building being built in Brisbane, as the capital of Queensland had not yet been decided.

The two-storey building was designed by colonial architect Charles Tiffin in the Classical revival style in 1860. The front half of the building contained the Governor's public and private rooms while the rear housed the service section. The front of the house had a plain design without displays of grandeur so as not to affront politicians and country citizens.

The first stage of the building was completed in March 1862 by builder Joshua Jeays. The building is built from locally sourced materials, with sandstone facades, Brisbane tuff (stone) (sometimes referred to incorrectly as 'Porphyry') to the service areas, red cedar, hoop pine and cast iron.

=== Governor Sir George Bowen ===
The family first arrived in Brisbane in 1859 and Adelaide House, now The Deanery of St John's Cathedral, was leased for their use as a temporary Government House, while the construction of this building was undertaken.

The Governor and his family moved into the building in April 1862. The first public function held in the building was a ball on Monday 16 June 1862 to celebrate the birthday of Queen Victoria. The ball was to have been earlier (Victoria's birthday being 24 May), but was postponed due to a period of public mourning for the Prince consort Albert. Sir George and Lady Diamantina Bowen hosted 300 to 400 guests. It was a gala occasion and the new Government House was praised for enabling "the Governor to exercise his hospitality without restrictions through the want of space". There were rooms available for dancing, drinking of claret, sherry, tea and coffee and the playing of the card game whist. Meanwhile, the dowagers and other ladies not involved in the drinking, dancing and card playing were entertained in drawing room. At 1 am, supper was served in the quadrangle, protected by a canvas roof and decorated with candles and Chinese lanterns. The dancing continued until 4 am, although the Bowens did not participate in the dancing due to his wife Lady Diamantina's delicate health.

Approximately one month later on 26 July 1862, Lady Diamantina was safely delivered of a daughter, Agnes. Lady Diamantina's "delicate health" at the Birthday Ball was presumably a delicate reference to her advanced pregnancy. Agnes is believed to be the first child born in the building (the custom of those times was that children were born at home, indeed, Brisbane had no maternity hospitals in that era). Their son, George William Howard, was also born at Government House on 9 April 1864.

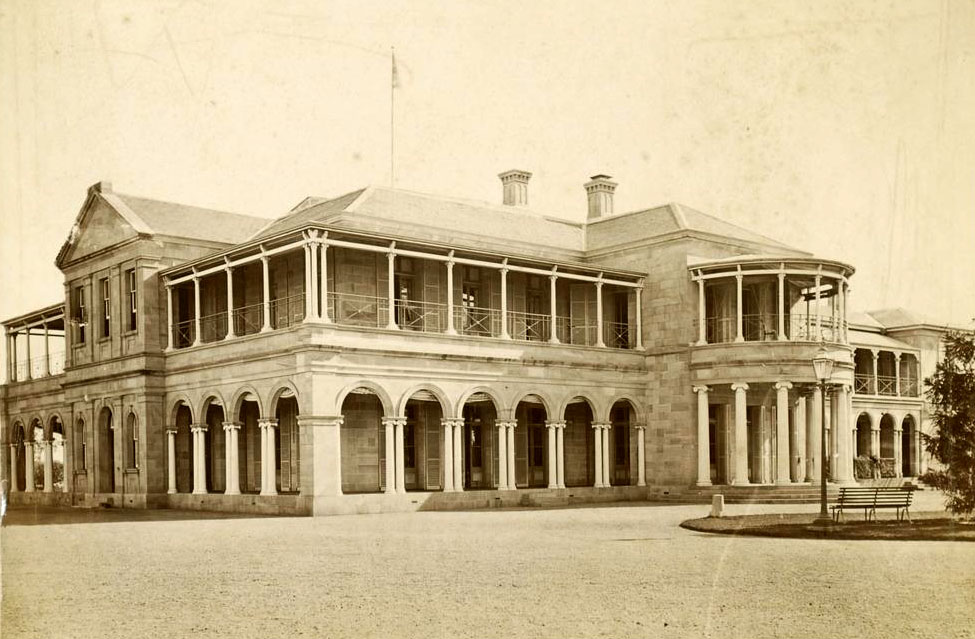
The then Government House circa 1879

Lady Diamantina Bowen was interested in the development of the gardens around the building, which features lawns and flower gardens on the public sides of the building and vegetable gardens at the rear. She collaborated with Walter Hill, curator of the adjacent Brisbane Botanic Gardens on a number of projects, including large public events which extended out from the grounds of Government House into the Botanic Gardens.

The house was originally lit with candles and kerosene lamps, but by the late 1860s, gas became available and was installed. Unfortunately the initial pipes used were too thin and it was not possible to turn on all the gas lights simultaneously.

In 1866 the Bread or Blood riot started, threatening the sacking of Government House. Hundreds of government officials were sworn in as Special Constables to assist police.

=== Other governors ===
The building was home to the first 11 of the Governors of Queensland and their families. The building was modified somewhat during those years, the most obvious difference to the public face of the building being the roofing of the previously open upper terraces converting them into more Queenslander-style verandahs. In 1873, a roof was built over the balcony. By the late 1870s the building was being described as inadequate, particularly for large scale entertainment purposes.

Some extensions were also made at the rear, but these were more related to the service areas. Larger gas pipes were eventually installed to allow all the lights to be used. Although Brisbane had electricity in the late 1880s, the cost of fitting it to Government House was regarded as too expensive.

About 1900, a billiard room was added at the request of Lord Lamington. The interior was renovated and redecorated in 1985–96.

=== Last resident governor ===
By 1909 the once spacious Government House was now nearly fifty years old, and by the standards of the times, perceived as being too small for the Governor's residence, especially as it lacked a ballroom deemed essential for entertaining. It was decided to give Government House to be the nucleus of Queensland's first university, the University of Queensland, which was to be established at Gardens Point. A plaque on the building commemorates this transfer in December 1909.

In early 1910, the Governor, Sir William MacGregor, relocated into the leased property Fernberg at Paddington, a suburb of Brisbane, as a temporary measure while a new Government House was constructed in Victoria Park. However, although the plans for the new Government House were drawn and the foundations laid, for some reason, the project was abandoned. In 1911 the Government purchased Fernberg for £10,000 to be the permanent Government House of Queensland, a role that continues to the present day.

== University of Queensland ==
On 10 December 1909, Old Government House was given to be the nucleus of the newly established University of Queensland, as part of the 50th anniversary celebrations of the founding of the State of Queensland. The university had electricity connected to the building about 1911.

The University of Queensland used the building until the late 1930s when the university outgrew the Gardens Point campus and relocated to its current main campus at St Lucia.

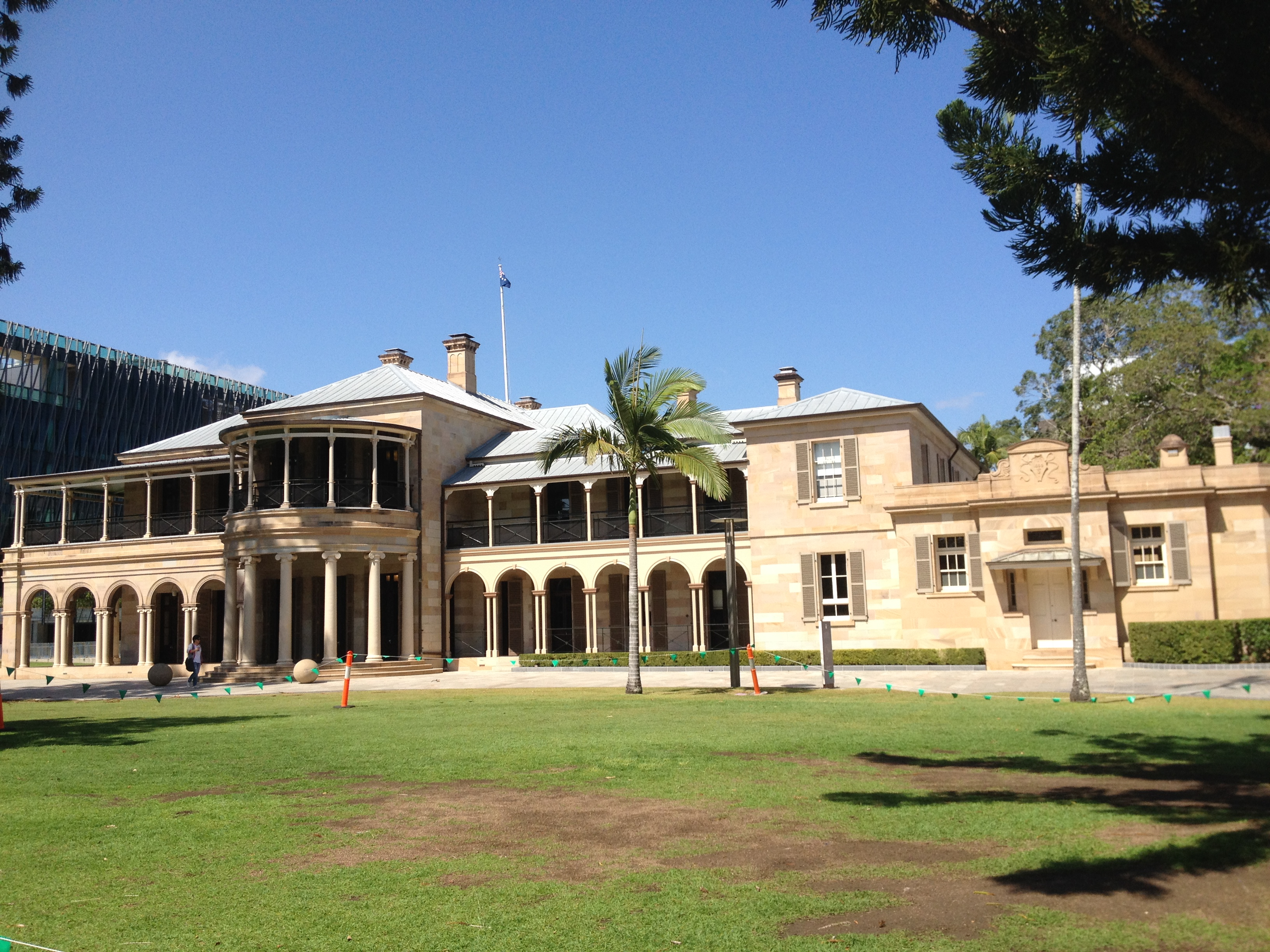
The first Government House in Queensland – side view

== Heritage protection ==
Old Government House has been used as the Queensland headquarters for the National Trust of Australia. Concerts have also been performed in the building.

In 1969, Old Government House was placed on the first list of significant heritage buildings compiled by the National Trust of Queensland, which protected the building from demolition. In March 1978, Old Government House became the first building to be protected by Queensland heritage legislation.

== Queensland University of Technology ==
In 2002, an agreement between the National Trust of Queensland, the Queensland Government and Queensland University of Technology gave custodianship of Old Government House to the Queensland University of Technology—QUT.

Queensland University of Technology performed a major three-year restoration of the building and it re-opened in 2009, with a ceremony on 7 June 2009 to mark the 150th anniversary of the establishment of Queensland. Speakers at the ceremony included Peter Coaldrake, Queensland Governor Penny Wensley, Queensland Premier Anna Bligh and QUT Chancellor (and former Queensland Governor) Peter Arnison. In addition to unveiling the plaque, Anna Bligh announced that QUT's lease of the building would be extended for another 30 years.

Having restored the buildings, QUT uses it for events and functions, and provide tours and information (including interactive displays) for visitors.

== Origin of the lamington ==
One of Australia's famous culinary features, the lamington was invented by the cook Armand Gallan at Government House, during the time of the Queensland Governor, Lord Lamington.

== See also ==
- Government House for information about Government House in Paddington, Queensland.
- Government Houses of Australia
- Government Houses of the British Empire
- Governors of Queensland
