= A. A. Lendon =

Australian medical practitioner

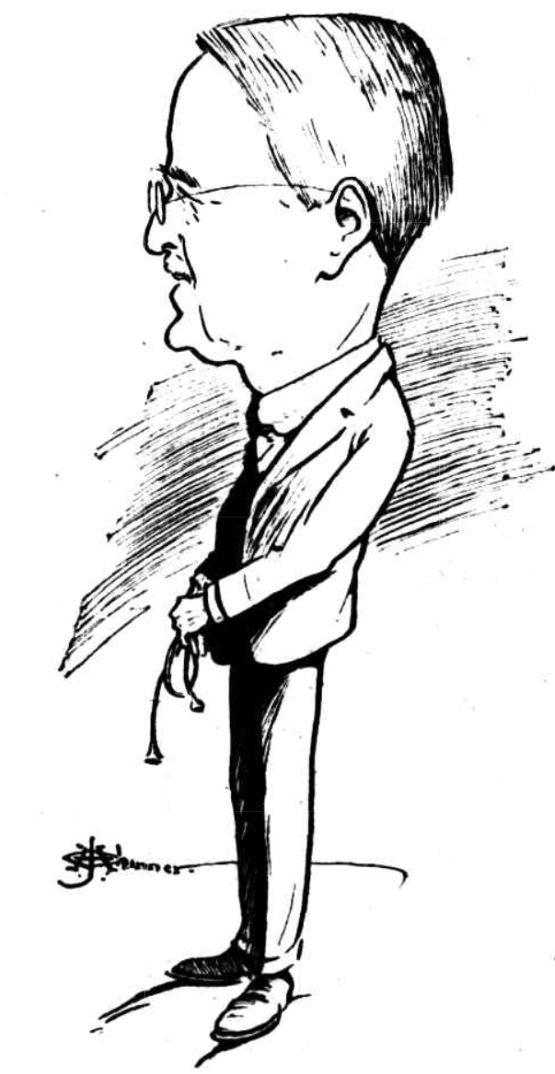
caricature by J. H. Chinner

Alfred Austin Lendon (died 29 June 1935) was an English medical doctor, of whom it was said few practitioners have exerted a wider influence on medical science in South Australia.

== Life ==
Lendon was born in Kent and educated at Maidstone Grammar School, King's College, London, and University College, London, where he gained his MD. and MRCS. degrees, and arrived in South Australia in 1883.

In 1884 he was, as a Government Medical Officer, sent to Bordertown to suppress an outbreak of smallpox, and was a member of the Medical Board from 1899 to 1932 and its president from 1912.

In 1885 he was elected to the board of the Adelaide Children's Hospital, which at the time consisted only of the Way block, and was active in three major stages of expansion. He replaced Dr William Peel Nesbitt (died 1894) as honorary medical officer from 1885, served as consulting surgeon, and succeeded the founder Dr Allan Campbell as vice-president, and was senior vice-president when he died.

He served as honorary physician to the Adelaide Hospital 1891–1894. He was president of the South Australian branch of the British Medical Association for two separate terms.

He was President of the District Trained Nursing Society from 1898, and saw it progress from a near-bankrupt organization to a vigorous, progressive and well-endowed institution. He also served for several years as national president of the Australasian Trained Nurses' Association. He was appointed patron of both organizations on his retirement. He had co-founded the ATNA's South Australia branch organisation with hospital owner Kate Hill and Dr Thomas George Wilson in 1905.

He was an occasional lecturer at the University of Adelaide and several collections of his lectures have been published.

== Publications ==
- Lendon, A. A. Clinical Lectures on Hydatid Disease of the Lungs (1902) London, Bailliere, Tindall and Cox
- Lendon, A. A. Nodal fever, febris nodosa : synonyms: erythema nodosum, erythema multiforme (1905)

He also edited several books on hydatid disease by John Davies Thomas (1844–1893).

== Other interests ==
He was founder and first president of the Numismatic Society of South Australia, president of the Commonwealth Club 1919–1922, and a longtime member of the Royal Geographical Society of Australasia, SA branch.

== Family ==
Lendon married Lucy Isabel Rymill (31 March 1865 – 22 April 1929), daughter of Henry Rymill on 26 August 1889.

- Dr Guy Austin Lendon (1895–1970)
- Dr Alan Harding Lendon (1903– )
- Dorothy Isabel Lendon (1890– )

They had a home on Brougham place, North Adelaide

He died after a long illness, and was privately cremated.

== Archives ==
The State Library of South Australia holds a collection of Papers of Dr Alfred Austin Lendon.
