= Dora Sweetapple =

Australian nurse (1872–1972)

- Born: Theodora Maude Sweetapple; 25 May 1872; Port Adelaide
- Died: 9 October 1972 (aged 100); Leabrook
- Education: Adelaide Children's Hospital
- Occupation: nurse
- Employer(s): District Trained Nursing Society, City of Adelaide ...
- Known for: Early district nurse
- Partner: Mabel Gill

Theodora Maude Sweetapple known as Dora Sweetapple (25 May 1872 – 9 October 1972) was an Australian nurse. She was one of the first district nurses and the first woman employed by the City of Adelaide.

== Life ==
Sweetapple was born in 1872 in Port Adelaide. Her parents Ann Mapleson (born Mitchell) and William Deane Sweetapple who had a brother born in the UK. Her father was a shipping agent, but he died when she was very young. She was the tenth child and her mother ran a school which she attended. Between 1891 and 1893 she trained as a nurse at Adelaide Children's Hospital where she and Mabel Gill became life-long friends.

The District Trained Nursing Society (DTNS), was inaugurated on 12 July 1894 following 12 months work by a trained nurse, named McLellan, in the Adelaide suburb of Bowden. Sweetapple had already been visiting and nursing people at the suggestion of the local rector. She became the second nurse employed by the DTNS. In her first full year she was paid £30 with £55 for expenses. She took care of over 150 patients making 1612 visits to see them, taking advantage of free bus rides, a bicycle and a ferry crossing.

Thomas Borthwick who became Adelaide's first bacteriologist in 1894 employed her as "city trained nurse" in 1899 and she was the first woman to work for the City of Adelaide.

The Australasian Trained Nurses' Association was founded in 1905 with Sweetapple as a member. In 1906 she and Maude Gill worked at a private hospital which they ran until 1913 when they went to Britain staying there throughout World War One employed by the Order of St John of Jerusalem and the Queen's Institute of District Nursing. Back in Australia after the war, they ran a nursing home and then a boarding house together.

Gill died in 1965 and Sweetapple was herself nursed in an infirmary. She died in Leabrook seven years later. Sweetapple had been able to vote from 1894 when women were first permitted in Adelaide. 125 years later the city celebrated this achievement and Sweetapple was added to the city's honour role.
