= Isla Blomfield =

Australian nurse

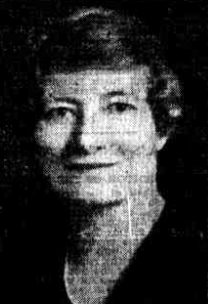
- in 28 February 1930 Sydney Morning Herald
- Born: Isla Stuart Blomfield; 9 July 1865; Mudgee
- Died: 16 August 1959 (aged 94); Potts Point
- Education: (later Royal) Prince Alfred Hospital
- Occupations: health visitor, public health official

Isla Stuart Blomfield (9 July 1865 – 16 August 1959) was an Australian nurse, sanitary inspector, and health visitor. She spent her career helping to reduce the high infant mortality in New South Wales, advising mothers about breastfeeding. She was the only woman health inspector in Sydney's health department, and she was an executive member of the Royal Society for the Welfare of Mothers and Babies.

== Life ==
Blomfield was born near Mudgee in New South Wales. She was the first of eight children of Margaret (born Cox) and Henry Wilson Blomfield, who was a grazier. Her parents were both born in Australia, and it is presumed that they employed a governess for her.

In January 1896, she started training as a nurse at the (later Royal) Prince Alfred Hospital. Susan McGahey was the matron. McGahey would co-found the Australasian Trained Nurses Association (ATNA). Blomfield left for a holiday after qualifying, and she was at London's Queen Charlotte's Lying-in Hospital in 1901 learning about midwifery. She went on a tour of American hospitals with McGahey, before returning to her former employees. At some time, she learned about treating diseases in China for three years and joined the ATNA.

In 1909, she took a train through Siberia, and continued to London where she was a fraternal delegate of the ATNA at the third congress of the International Council of Nurses in July in Westminster. In the following year, she was the nurse-in-charge at the Alice Rawson School for Mothers in Darlington. Sydney's Health Officer William George Armstrong had decided that half of the babies dying in NSW could be saved by good advice, and he employed Blomfield as a health visitor. He felt that additional artificial food was a poor supplement for breastfeeding. Blomfield visited young mothers at a rate of 1,400 per year until Baby Centres began in 1915. She advocated that young mothers should receive cheap milk so that they could better feed their babies.

The Royal Society for the Welfare of Mothers and Babies was formed in 1918 by the New South Wales government to address the continuing high infant mortality rate at a time when many young mothers were widows, and of the flu pandemic. Blomfield became an executive member.

In March 1930, she retired as the only woman health inspector in Sydney's health department. William George Armstrong claimed that the work with mothers had been the contributing factor to the later observed reduction in infant mortality.

Blomfield died in her flat in 1959 in the Sydney suburb of Potts Point, where she had taken up sculpture, and was cremated with Christian Science forms.
