= Florence Chatfield =

English-born Australian nurse (1867–1949)

Florence Chatfield OBE
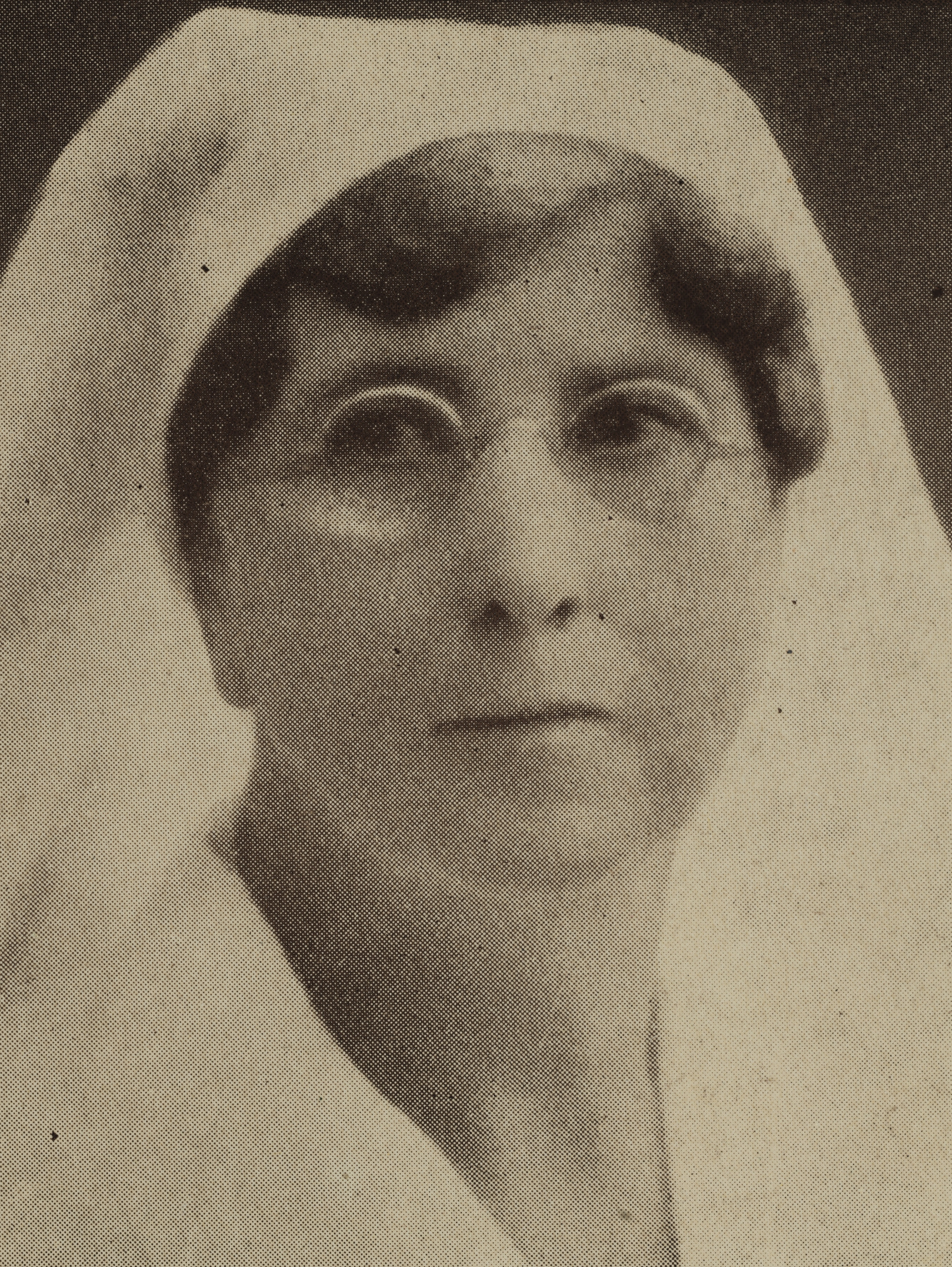
- Born: 1 February 1867; Worthing
- Died: 5 November 1949 (aged 82); Nundah private hospital
- Occupation: nurse
- Partner: Ellen Barron

Florence Chatfield OBE (1 February 1867 – 5 November 1949) was an English-born Australian nurse. She was the matron of the Diamantina Hospital for Chronic Diseases for over 30 years. She was the first organiser of the Queensland Government Baby Clinics and she was a founding member of the Queensland branch of the Australasian Trained Nurses' Association.

== Life ==
Chatfield was born in southern England in the town of Worthing in 1867. Her parents were Jane (born Porter) and William Chatfield who was a confectioner. She and her sister, Emily, left from Gravesend in 1885 and emigrated to Australia. They were on board the RMS Chyebassa with about 300 other immigrants. They were under the supervision of a matron. The rest of their family followed in 1887, although by this time their mother had died. They had arrived as domestic servants, but in 1889 she and her sisters trained as nurses at Brisbane General Hospital.

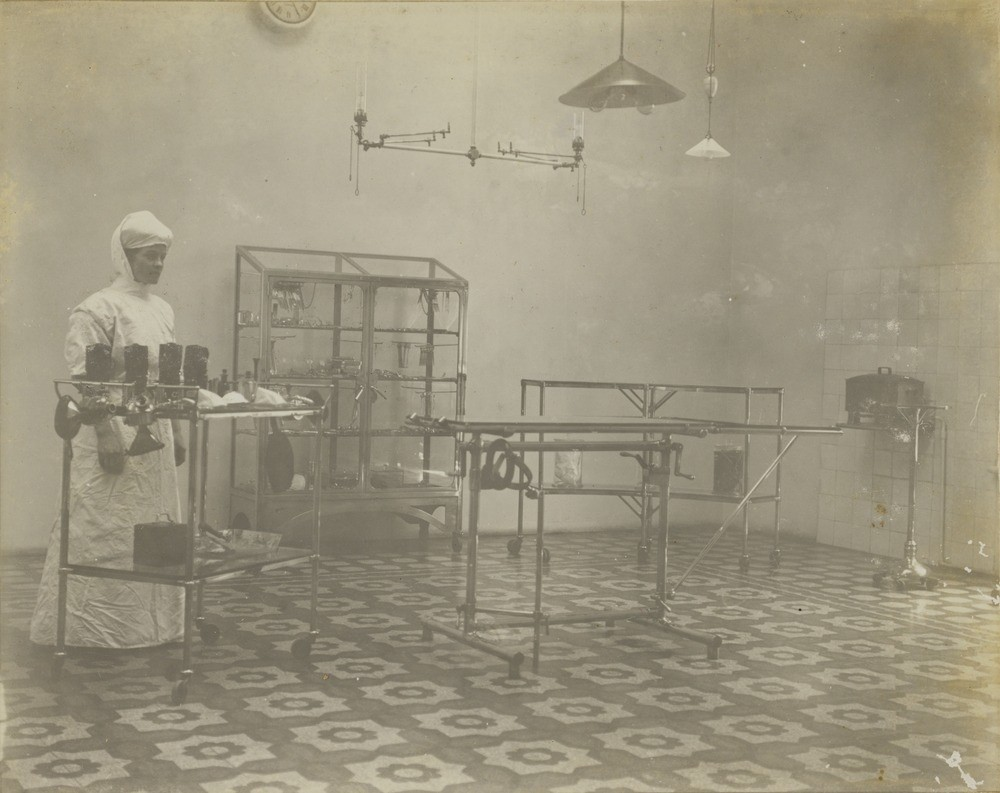
Chatfield in a Royal Brisbane Hospital operating theatre ca. 1892

In 1900 she became the matron of the Diamantina Hospital for Chronic Diseases. This was a role she would hold for 34 years.

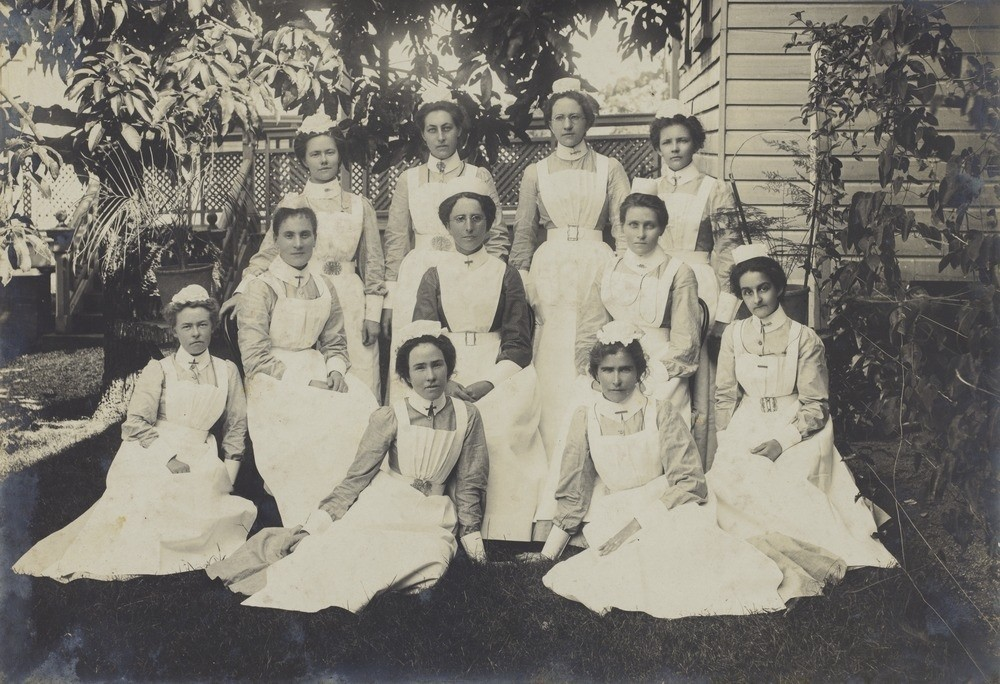
Florence Chatfield in 1905 with her nurses

In 1904, she was in charge of the very first meeting of what became the Queensland Branch of the Australasian Trained Nurses' Association (ATNA) and this was to receive her attention for the rest of her life. She and Ellen Barron were both ATNA council members and one year (1922–23) they job-shared the role of the organisation's secretary.

Chatfield was awarded an OBE in the 1932 New Year Honours. In 1933 she gave a national broadcast on radio 4QG. She spoke about gender-roles and her belief that although barriers were being lowered between professions she believed that caring for the young and the sick would always be work undertaken by women.

Ellen Barron was still a colleague of Chatfield's and they lived together for part of their retirement. Chatfield died in the Brisbane suburb of Nundah in a private hospital in 1949. and Barron died in the War Veterans' Home at Caboolture on 8 July 1951.
