= Diamantina Health Care Museum =

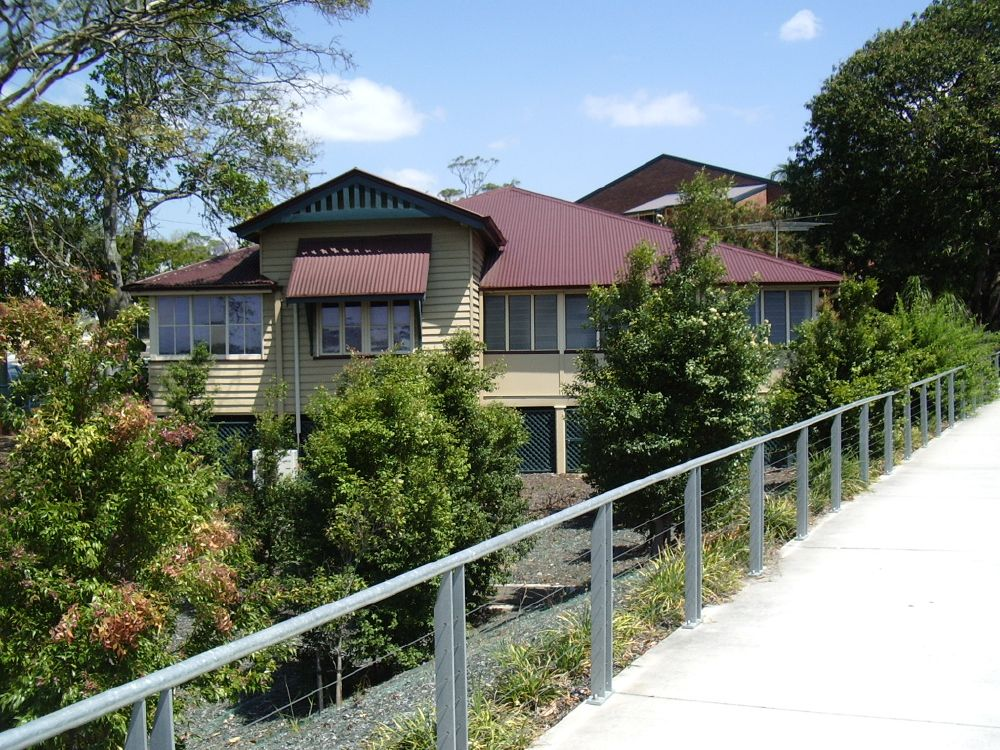
- Former Dispenser's House, Diamantina Hospital

- Location within Queensland Location within Australia
- 27.5005°S 153.0332°E
- Location: Cornwall Street, Woolloongabba, City of Brisbane, Queensland, Australia

History
- Design period: 1900–1914 (early 20th century)
- Built: 1908

Site notes
- Architect: Thomas Pye of Queensland Government Architect's Office
- Website: Official website

Queensland Heritage Register
- Official name: Former Dispenser's House, Diamantina Hospital, Diamantina Health Care Museum
- Type: state heritage (built)
- Designated: 3 July 2007
- Reference no.: 602560
- Significant period: 1908–1974
- Significant components: residential accommodation – other
- Builders: W Chaplain

The former Dispenser's House of Diamantina Hospital is now the heritage-listed Diamantina Health Care Museum at Cornwall Street, Woolloongabba, City of Brisbane, Queensland, Australia. It was designed by Thomas Pye of the Queensland Government Architect's Office and built in 1908 by W Chaplain. It was added to the Queensland Heritage Register on 3 July 2007.

== History ==
The former Dispenser's House was built in 1908 as part of the facilities of the Diamantina Hospital for Chronic Diseases and is now a health care museum.

The Diamantina Hospital was established in 1901 by adapting the facilities of the Diamantina Orphanage, named for the wife of the first Governor of Queensland, Lady Diamantina Bowen. This had been founded in 1864 under the committee of the Brisbane Hospital in two cottages, near the Victoria Barracks, that had been used as a fever hospital.

Within two years, the orphanage was caring for about 100 children and received a government subsidy. In 1882, a 20-acre (8.1 ha) block of land on Ipswich Road at Woolloongabba was purchased to allow the construction of a larger facility. In 1883 the Diamantina Orphanage opened at this new location and by 1886 was caring for more than 350 children. This number was reduced by boarding out some children and removing those with a parent able to make some contribution to their support.

In 1893, severe flooding damaged the Woogaroo Lunatic Asylum, so about 40 of the quieter patients from the asylum were moved to the orphanage, and the children were dispersed. From 1898 to 1900, the facility was used as a reformatory for boys.

At that time, Queensland had no hospital to treat chronically ill patients. Tuberculosis was a major cause of death into the 20th century and "consumptive" patients were also drawn to Queensland because of the belief that warm weather helped to cure the disease. Treatment for tuberculosis at that time consisted mainly of isolation, bed rest, good diet and exposure to fresh air and sunshine. Medical professionals lobbied for a facility to treat chronic cases. A sanatorium was opened in Dalby in 1900 and the Diamantina Orphanage, with its pleasant situation on a wooded slope, was adapted as a hospital. Its dormitories were enlarged as wards, and on 5 August 1901 it opened as the Diamantina Hospital for Chronic Diseases. It was a Public Charitable Institution under the Charitable Institution Act. and was under the care of the Department of Health. It accepted patients from the general hospital and from the Dunwich Benevolent Asylum, many of whom were suffering from tuberculosis. The Diamantina Hospital opened with 32 beds and a general staff of 19 administered by a Matron, Miss Florence Chatfield, a Superintendent, Dr Francis Washington Everad Hare, and a Head Wardsman and Dispenser, Mr Frederick Staubwasser.

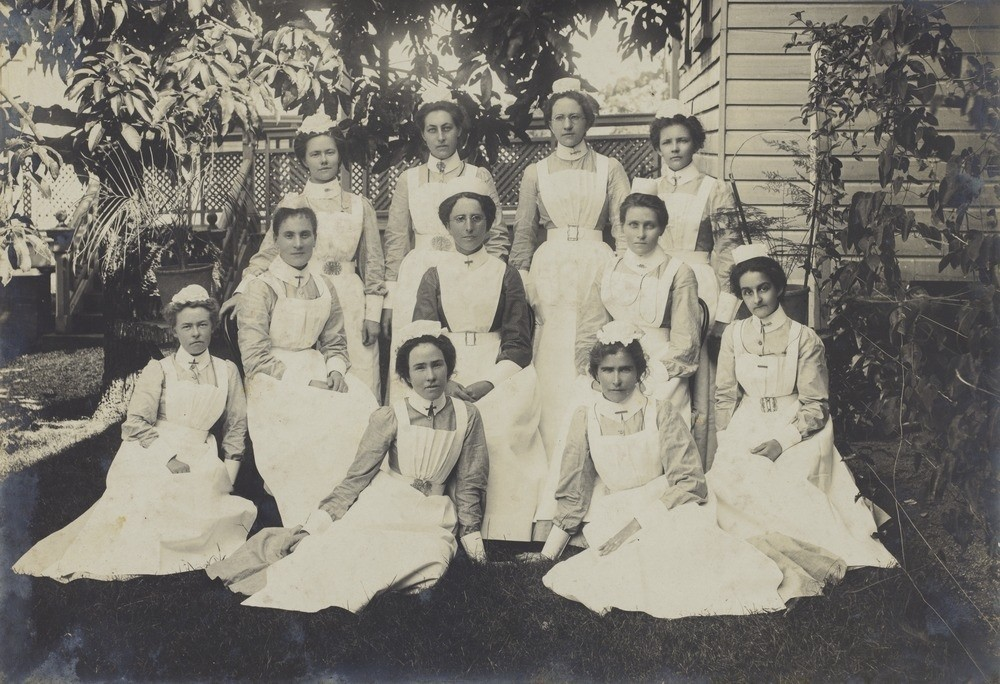
Matron Florence Chatfield in 1905 with her nurses

By 1903 the hospital had 72 beds and two open-air wards. The superintendent resigned and Miss Chatfield added his duties to her own. In 1907 Mr Staubwasser, planning marriage, requested a raise in salary and a cottage within the hospital grounds. His request was strongly supported by Miss Chatfield, in a letter to the Home Secretary, stressing his value to the institution. The request was approved but the cottage was not built immediately.

Thomas Pye, Deputy Government Architect, prepared sketch plans for a dwelling of 700 square feet plus a large front verandah, to be constructed near the hospital Dispensary. Tenders were called on 9 July 1908 and that of W Chaplain for £330 was accepted. By the beginning of 1909 the house was occupied.

Mr Staubwasser served as Dispenser until 1912 when he became Assistant Superintendent. In that year another verandah was added to the cottage and a laundry in 1914. In 1923 the house was extended by adding another verandah to the south and a third bedroom to the front. The main entrance was then relocated to the northern verandah. In 1935 Mr Staubwasser was promoted to Superintendent but continued to occupy the house until his death in 1938. From then until the end of the Second World War, the house was occupied by a series of Medical Officers from the Brisbane General Hospital who were responsible for the Diamantina Hospital patients.

In 1943 the Diamantina Hospital became the South Brisbane Auxiliary Hospital and was under the control of the Brisbane General Hospital. Following World War II, an intensive programme was carried out by the Queensland government to eradicate tuberculosis by screening and treatment. This reduced the need for chronic care facilities.

In 1956 a new 800-bed acute hospital was built in the grounds of the South Brisbane Hospital. In 1960 it was renamed the Princess Alexandra Hospital (after Princess Alexandra, The Honourable Lady Ogilvy) and had its own hospital board. The cottage, after accommodating a series of staff members, was modified for use as a Home Haemodialysis Training Centre in 1974. In 1998 it was used by the History and Archives Committee and in 1999 by the Redevelopment Group.

In 2003 the former Dispenser's House was renovated and opened in 2004 as the Diamantina Health Care Museum.

A wall has been removed between bedrooms and an office created on the northern verandah by the construction of a partition. The building remains substantially intact and retains its domestic appearance.

== Description ==
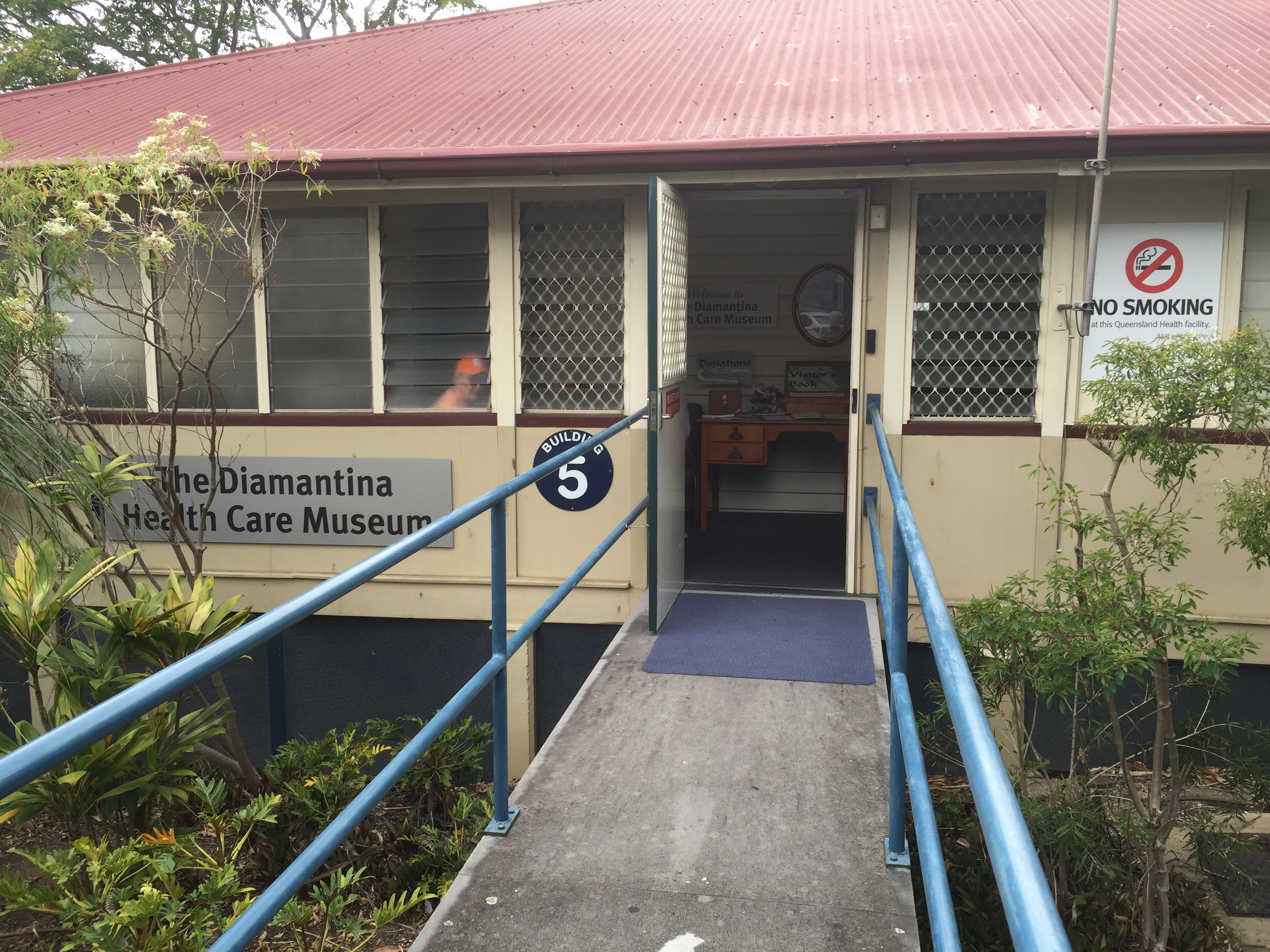
Entrance, 2016

The former Dispenser's House is situated close to the Cornwall Street gate to the Princess Alexandra Hospital. It is a timber building with a hipped roof clad with corrugated iron sheeting and is set on new concrete stumps.

There is a gabled bay with four windows to the eastern elevation and verandahs to the north and south. The southern verandah is built in with timber-framed windows and the northern by glass louvres. The walls are timber-lined and there are timber floors and ceilings. The rooms opening onto the southern verandah and some of the internal rooms have French doors with transom lights above. Modern toilets have been added.

== Heritage listing ==
The former Dispenser's House of the Diamantina Hospital was listed on the Queensland Heritage Register on 3 July 2007 having satisfied the following criteria.

The place is important in demonstrating the evolution or pattern of Queensland's history.

The former Dispenser's House is important for demonstrating the former use of the site as the Diamantina Hospital for Chronic Diseases, which opened in 1901 on the site of the current Princess Alexandra Hospital. This was the first such hospital in Queensland and was important in the development of health care in the State. The former residence, constructed in 1908, also demonstrates the common practice of the time of providing on site living quarters for key personnel.

The place demonstrates rare, uncommon or endangered aspects of Queensland's cultural heritage.

The former Dispenser's House is now rare as the last remaining structure from the Diamantina Hospital for Chronic Diseases.
