= Translational Research Institute (Australia) =

Research institute in Australia

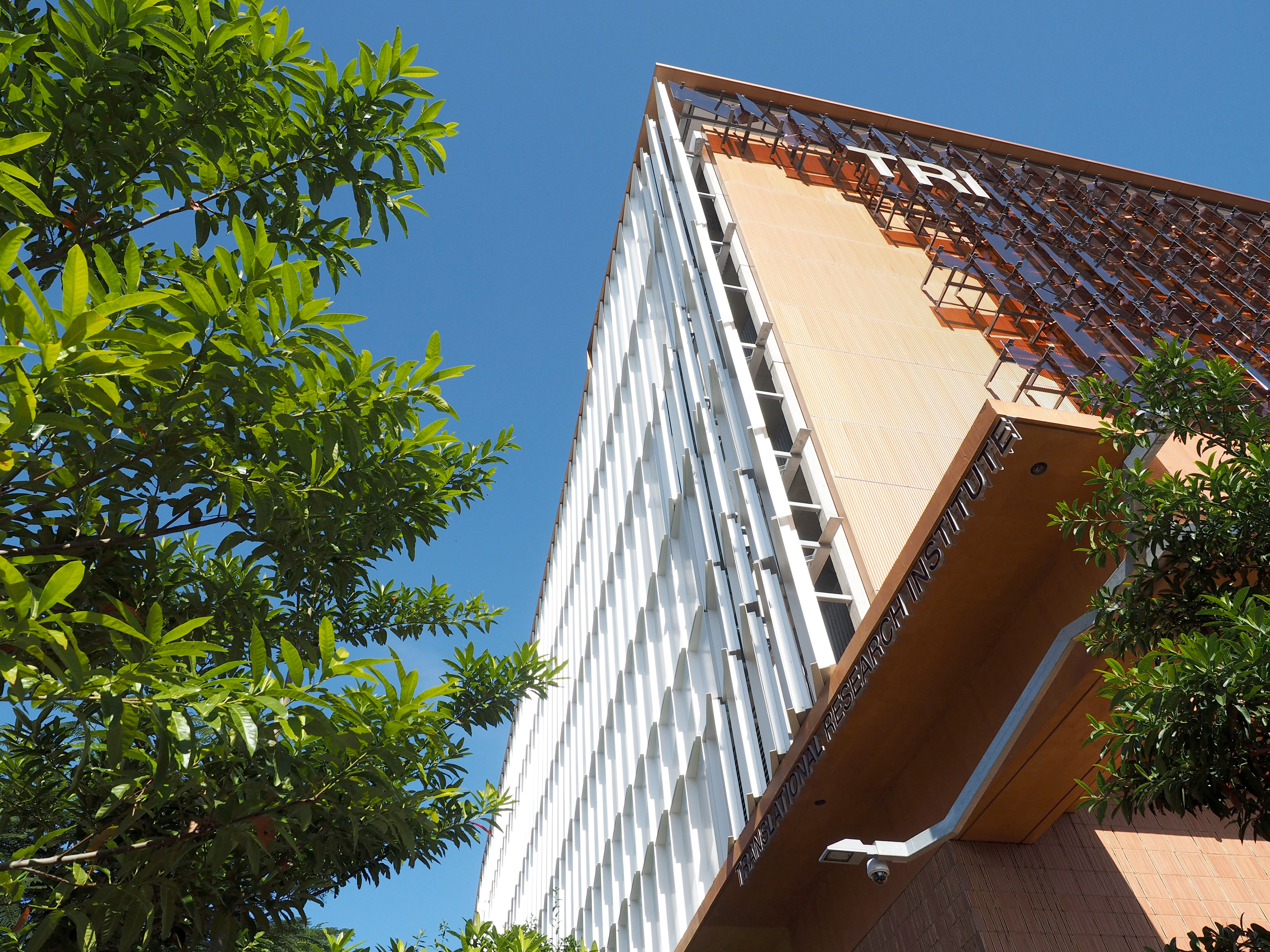
- The Translational Research Institute
- Founder: Professor Ian Frazer AC
- Established: October 2013
- Mission: Medical research
- Focus: Translational
- Chief Executive Officer: Professor Maher Gandhi
- Faculty: University of Queensland; Queensland University of Technology
- Adjunct faculty: Brisbane Diamantina Health Partners
- Staff: 1100
- Location: Kent Street, Woolloongabba, Brisbane, Queensland, Australia
- Coordinates: 27.499101°S 153.031221°E
- Interactive map of Translational Research Institute
- Website: www.tri.edu.au

The Translational Research Institute (TRI) is Australia's first translational medical research institute dedicated to translating scientific discoveries into applications for medical practice.

Located in Woolloongabba, in inner-city Brisbane, Queensland, TRI is supported by a grant from the Australian Government ($140 million); and funding from the Queensland Government ($107 million); Queensland University of Technology ($25 million); and The University of Queensland ($10 million) to combine clinical and translational research to advance progress from laboratory discovery to application in patient care. TRI is a Pty Ltd. company with four shareholders: Queensland Health, the Queensland University of Technology, The University of Queensland and Mater Medical Research.

== History ==
In 2004 a proposal was submitted to the Queensland Government for the development and construction of TRI. In 2007 this progressed to project design. Five years on and A$354 million in funding from the Australian and Queensland Governments, UQ and QUT, TRI became operational and four institutes came together. TRI was established in January 2013 and officially opened in October of the same year by the Governor-General Dame Quentin Bryce.

== Research ==
Over 800 researchers and clinicians from TRI’s four shareholders undertake medical research and clinical studies into cancer; inflammation and infection; obesity and diabetes; kidney disease and liver disease; and bone and joint disorders.

TRI research aims to:

- prevent disease and provide protection against infection
- understand diseases to improve early detection, diagnosis, treatment and recovery
- reduce the risk of disease spreading
- relieve symptoms and better manage chronic diseases and trauma

== Researchers ==
Some of TRI's researchers include:

- Professor Ian Frazer – known for the development of the HPV vaccine against cervical cancer
- Associate Professor Glenda Gobe – co-director, renal atrophy and regeneration, fibrosis, immunity and inflammation, and kidney cancer
- Professor Judith Clements - known for Kallikrein proteases in prostate and ovarian cancers
- Professor Josephine Forbes - specialises in the study of glycation and diabetes
- Professor David Johnson – known for kidney treatments and transplants

== Facilities ==
Located on the Princess Alexandra (PA) Hospital campus, the seven-story TRI building incorporates four floors of laboratories; and facilities for research support, administration and teaching.

TRI’s core facilities include:

- Clinical Research Facilities
- Flow Cytometry Core Facility
- Histology Core Facility
- Microscopy Core Facility
- Proteomics Core Facility
- Preclinical Imaging Core Facility

Co-located with TRI are the following facilities:

- Patheon Biologics, the first major biopharmaceutical manufacturing facility in Australia.
- UQ Dutton Park Campus
- Brisbane Diamantina Health Partners, an academic health science system

== The TRI building ==
The TRI building was designed by Wilson Architects + Donovan Hill and was built by Watpac, completed in 2012 at the total cost of $354 million. The facility features eight levels: four levels of laboratories, administration and teaching facilities, an auditorium and conference rooms, staff amenities and an "outdoor room" atrium area. TRI is a 32,000 square metres (340,000 sq ft) building. It stands on the grounds of the Princess Alexandra Hospital in Brisbane on the former site of the Vision Australia building, of which the red clay bricks were salvaged and reused as the base of TRI.

The building received several architectural and design awards.

== See also ==
- Health in Australia
