= Susan McGahey =

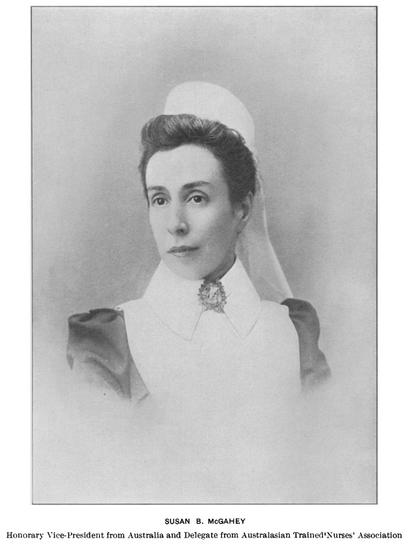
- Born: 1862; Stewartstown, Ireland
- Died: November 16, 1919 (aged 56–57); Carlingford, New South Wales, Australia
- Occupation: matron
- Known for: President of the International Council of Nurses (1904 - 1909)

Susan Bell McGahey (1862 - November 16, 1919) was the matron of the Royal Prince Alfred Hospital from 1891 to 1904. McGahey was also co-founder of the Australasian Trained Nurses' Association in 1899 and president of the International Council of Nurses from 1904 to 1909.

== Early life and education ==
Susan Bell McGahey was born in 1862 in Stewartstown, Ireland. She was partially homeschooled before attending a college in Belfast where she received multiple awards and scholarships. After moving to England in the 1870s, McGahey completed her nursing training at The London Hospital in 1886. with an additional certificate at the Obstetrical Society of London.

== Career ==
McGahey initially started her nurse training as a Paying Probationer at The London Hospital, Whitechapel, London in 1884. She transferred to become a Regular Probationer and completed her training under Eva Luckes in 1886. From December 1887 until August 1889 she worked at The London as a Holiday Sister, and then Ward Sister before moving to Australia because of her health. Upon arriving in Australia in 1890, McGahey became a matron at Carrington Convalescent Hospital in Camden, New South Wales. Later in 1890 she became Matron's Assistant at the Prince Alfred Hospital Sydney.The following year, she replaced Catherine C. Downs as matron of the Royal Prince Alfred Hospital in 1891. As matron, she introduced recommendations about the training and hiring of nurses in New South Wales. One of her charges was Isla Stuart Blomfield who would go on to be another leading nurse. In 1901 McGahey and Blomfield went on a tour of American hospitals. In 1904, McGahey resigned from the RPAH because the then Chairman of the Board of Directors, Professor Anderson Stuart refused to allow her to establish a nurse training school. McGahey moved to Charlemont Private Hospital where she opened a training hospital for nurses.

Outside of her career as a matron, McGahey was a co-founder of the Australasian Trained Nurses' Association in 1899. During her time at the ATNA, McGahey was elected president of the International Council of Nurses in 1904. She remained at the ATNA as a secretary until 1912.

== Death ==
McGahey died from cancer on 16 November 1919 in Carlingford, New South Wales, Australia.
