= Joan Stevenson Abbott =

Australian nursing sister and army matron (1899–1975)

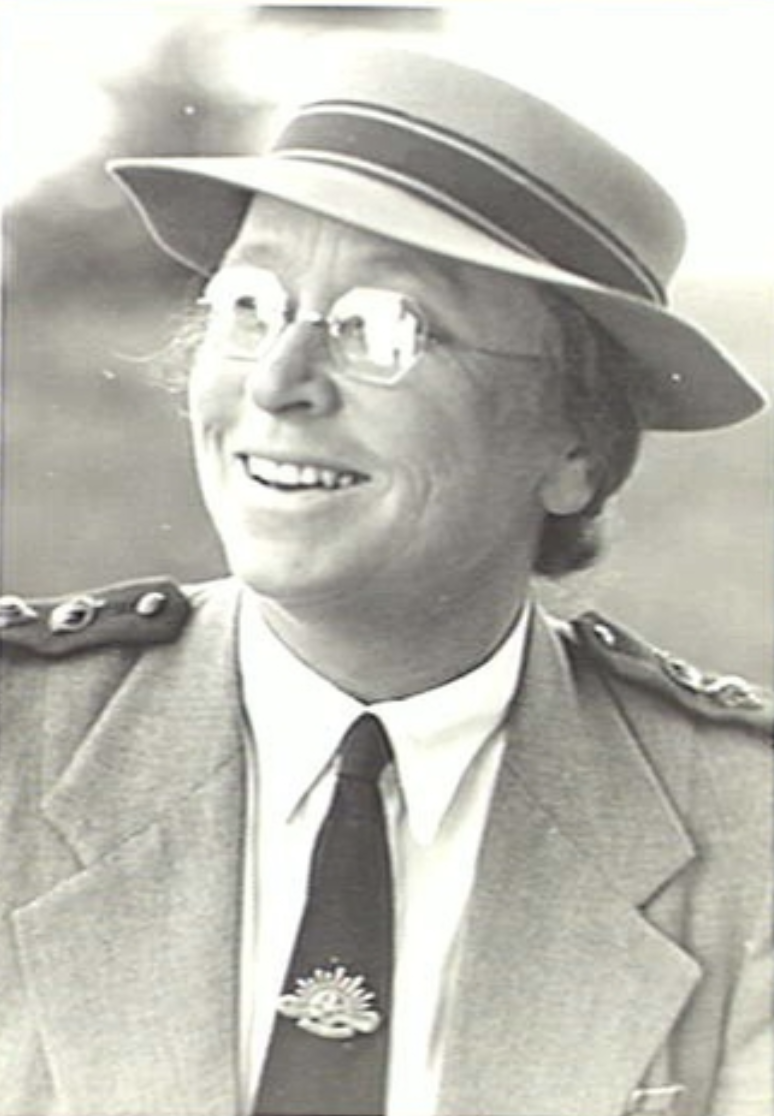
- Abbott in Melbourne in 1944
- Born: 11 December 1899; Brisbane, Queensland
- Died: 27 November 1975 (aged 75); Corinda, Queensland
- Military career
- Allegiance: Australia
- Branch: Australian Army
- Service years: 1940–1954
- Rank: Lieutenant Colonel
- Nickname: Judy
- Service number: QFX700118
- Conflicts: Second World War
- Awards: Royal Red Cross; Florence Nightingale Medal

Joan Stevenson (Judy) Abbott, RRC (11 December 1899 – 27 November 1975) was an Australian army hospital matron during the Second World War.

== Early life and education ==
Abbott was born on 11 December 1899 in Brisbane, Queensland. She undertook her basic nursing training at Brisbane General Hospital from 1920 to 1923, and later passed her midwifery certificate at Lady Bowen Hospital in April 1926. She was appointed a baby clinic nurse, on probation, the following month, and completed her child welfare certificate in June 1926.

== Career ==
On 8 August 1940 Abbott was appointed for service with the Second Australian Imperial Force as a matron of a unit of Queensland nurses. Posted to the Middle East, Abbott was in charge of a 1200-bed Australian Base Hospital. She returned to Australia in 1943 and in April was appointed principal matron of the Queensland Lines of Communication Area.

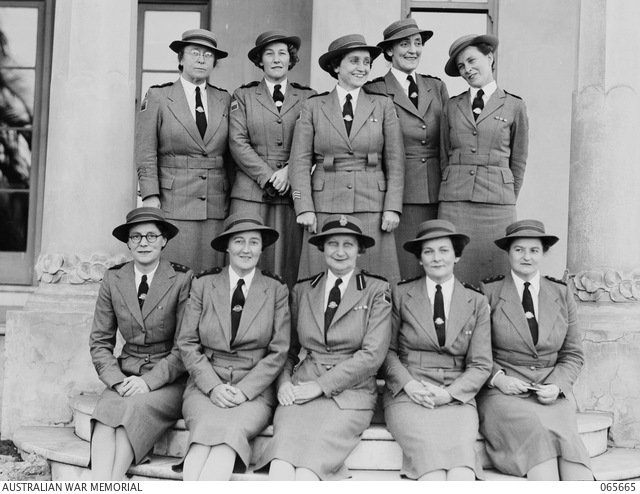
Principal matrons in Melbourne in 1944: Joan Stevenson Abbott is top left, Ethel Jessie Bowe is centre top row and Annie Sage is middle bottom row.

In June 1946 Abbott was awarded a Florence Nightingale Foundation scholarship and undertook two years' postgraduate study in London. Abbott retired from her position of principal matron, Northern Command on 11 December 1954, having reached the compulsory retirement age of 55. From 1954 to 1956 she was the President of the Australasian Trained Nurses' Association. She was frustrated that she failed to improve the working conditions of nurses.

== Awards and honours ==
On 18 February 1943, Abbott received the Royal Red Cross for "service to the Australian Army Nursing Service". She received the Coronation Medal on 1 June 1953, and was awarded the Florence Nightingale Medal in 1957.

== Death and legacy ==
Abbott fractured her spine in 1975 and became paraplegic. She died on 27 November 1975 in Bethesda Hospital Corinda, Queensland. Her body was left to the anatomy department at the University of Queensland.
