= Ellen Barron =

Australian nurse (1875–1951)

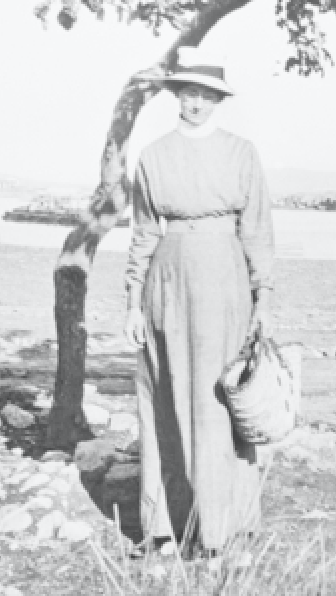
Ellen Barron on Lemnos, 1915

Ellen Barron (1875 – 8 July 1951) was a nurse in Queensland, Australia. She was a matron and leader in the Queensland nursing profession.

== Life ==
Barron was born in Berkshire, England, was educated at Oxford and Queensland, and trained at the Brisbane General Hospital from 1896 to 1899 and worked as staff nurse there from 1899 to 1901. She was head nurse at the Maryborough General Hospital from 1902 to 1904.

Barron enlisted in the Australian Army Nursing Service in World War I. She was stationed at Lemnos during the landing at Gallipoli, and she also served in Egypt and France. She returned to Australia in early 1917, suffering from pulmonary fibrosis.

On her return from active service, she was appointed to the Valley Centre of the Maternal and Child Welfare Services, and in 1922 she was sent to New Zealand for six months to study child welfare under Sir Truby King. In 1923 Barron opened the first training school in child welfare nursing in Brisbane. She took over the position of supervisor and organizer of the Queensland Government Baby Clinics from Florence Chatfield who had been the first appointee in 1918. Doris Bardsley who was to be the President of the Australasian Trained Nurses' Association was one of the women on this course at Diamantina Hospital.

In 1928 Barron was appointed superintendent of nurses, Maternal and Child Welfare Service. She retired in 1939.

She was associated with the Australasian Trained Nurses' Association Rest Home from its inception in 1924, and for some years was honorary secretary and a trustee.

Barron received the Jubilee Medal in 1935 and the Coronation Medal in 1937.

Barron was still a colleague of Florence Chatfield from the 1920s and they lived together for part of their retirement. Chatfield died in 1949 and Barron died in the War Veterans' Home at Caboolture on 8 July 1951 and was cremated.
