= David Johnson (nephrologist) =

Australian nephrologist (born 1964)

Professor David Johnson PSM FAHMS
- Born: David Wayne Johnson; 19 May 1964 (age 62); Australia
- Education: The University of Sydney, The University of Queensland
- Scientific career
- Fields: Nephrology
- Workplaces: Translational Research Institute, University of Queensland

David Wayne Johnson is an Australian nephrologist known for kidney treatments and transplants in Australia. In 2009 he was a Queensland State Finalist for Australian of the Year, for his work in the early recognition and care of people with chronic kidney disease and specifically for his work in detection of chronic kidney disease.

== Current roles ==
Johnson currently holds multiple positions within various medical and academic facilities in South East Queensland and Australia, including:

- Director of the Metro South and Ipswich Nephrology and Transplant Service (MINTS)
- Medical Director of the Queensland Renal Transplant Service at Princess Alexandra Hospital
- Professor of Medicine and Professor of Population Health at University of Queensland,
- Director of the Centre for Kidney Disease Research,
- Theme Leader of Diamantina Health Partners Chronic Disease and Ageing,
- Chair of the CARI Guidelines Working Parties on Peritoneal Dialysis Adequacy,
- Evaluation of Renal Function and Management of Early CKD,
- Chair of the Kidney Check Australia Taskforce,
- Co-chair of the Australasian Creatinine and eGFR Consensus Working Party,
- Co-chair of the Australasian Proteinuria Consensus Working Party,
- Founding Member and Deputy Chair of the Australasian Kidney Trials Network,
- Founding Member of the NHMRC-endorsed Cardiovascular and Renal Centre of Clinical Research Excellence (CCRE),
- Member of the ANZDATA Registry Peritoneal Dialysis Working Group,
- International Society of Peritoneal Dialysis Councillor and International Society of Nephrology Councillor.

== Awards and recognition ==
- 2005 – TJ Neale Award by the Australian and New Zealand Society of Nephrology for outstanding contributions to nephrologic science
- 2009 – Queensland finalist in the Australian of the Year Awards
- 2011 – Public Service Medal by the Governor-General of Australia for outstanding public service, particularly research into the early detection and management of kidney disease
- 2014 – International Distinguished Medal by the US National Kidney Foundation
- 2019 – Fellow of the Australian Academy of Health and Medical Sciences (FAHMS)

== Publications ==
Johnson's notable contributions to kidney research include:

- Guidelines for the management of absolute cardiovascular disease risk
- Hepatitis C infection in dialysis
- Chronic kidney disease (CKD) management in general practice
- Translational Research Institute (Australia) (TRI) Awards 2014 Grant
- NRMRC Practitioner Fellowship
