= Martha Bidmead =

Guernsey-born Australian nurse (1862–1940)

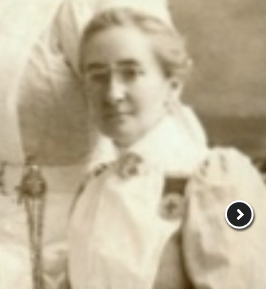
- Sister Bidmead in c. 1899
- Born: 5 December 1862; Saint Peter Port, Guernsey
- Died: 23 July 1940 (aged 77); Payneham, South Australia
- Military career
- Allegiance: Colony of South Australia; Australia
- Branch: South Australian Contingent, Australian Army Medical Corps
- Service years: 1899–1902
- Rank: Nursing Sister
- Conflicts: Second Boer War
- Awards: Royal Red Cross; Mentioned in Despatches

Martha Sarah Bidmead, RRC (5 December 1862 – 23 July 1940) was a Guernsey-born Australian nurse. She led a nursing contingent to the Second Boer War and she was one of only three Australian nurses to receive the Royal Red Cross for her services in the conflict. She later led the District Trained Nursing Society as superintendent from 1912 to 1926.

== Early life ==
Bidmead was born on the Island of Guernsey on 5 December 1862 in Saint Peter Port. She emigrated to the Colony of South Australia with her four sisters on the ship John Elder after their parents had died. They arrived on 30 April 1885. She decided to train as a nurse at Adelaide Children's Hospital in 1886, qualifying as a charge nurse and serving until 1889. Bidmead was then employed privately until she was appointed as one of Burra Burra District Hospital's staff nurses.

== Nursing career ==
Bidmead was chosen to lead six nurses after she volunteered to be part of the South Australian government's contribution to the Second Boer War. They sailed in February 1900 and after they arrived in South Africa they went to work at the 2nd General Hospital near Cape Town.

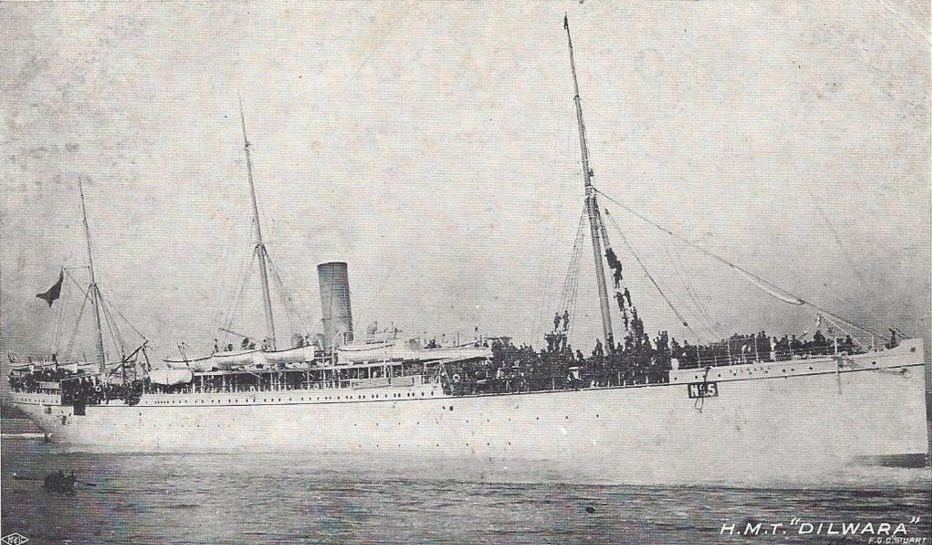
HMT Dilwara

In December 1901 Bidmead was awarded the Royal Red Cross. Bidmead was in England at the time, having sailed to Britain in charge of the wounded aboard the hospital ship Dilwara. She one of only three Australian nurses to receive the Royal Red Cross in the Second Boer War, and the only one from South Australia. The other two were Sister Elizabeth Nixon (1901) and Sister Marianne Rawson (1902). Bidmead and Nixon were presented with their medals personally by the King and Bidmead's detailed account was published in the Adelaide Observer.

In 1912 Bidmead became the District Trained Nursing Society's superintendent and she is credited with making the society a success. She stood down in 1926. Bidmead had been living with her sisters in the Adelaide suburb of Payneham when she died on 23 July 1940.
