= Ida Dorothy Love =

Australian nurse and midwifery educator (1908–1990)

Ida Dorothy Love BEM
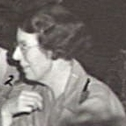
- Born: 13 November 1908; Orange, New South Wales, Australia
- Died: 10 May 1990 (aged 81) Mowll Village, Castle Hill, New South Wales, Australia
- Allegiance: Australia
- Branch: Australian Army Nursing Service, Second Australian Imperial Force
- Service years: 1942-1947
- Conflicts: Bougainville campaign
- Awards: Order of the British Empire
- Education: Fort Street Girls High School; Royal Alexandra Hospital for Children
- Other work: Nurse, midwife, midwifery educator

Ida Dorothy Love BEM (13 November 1908 – 10 May 1990) was an Australian military nurse, midwife and midwifery educator.

== Biography ==
Love was born on 13 November 1908 in Orange, New South Wales, Australia. Her parents were railway engineer Matthew Henry Love and Edith Eleanor Love (née Lillyman), and she was the eldest of their four children.

After moving to Sydney with her family, Love was educated at Fort Street Girls High School. She trained at the Royal Alexandra Hospital for Children, then became a staff nurse at the Alfred Hospital, Melbourne, Victoria, Australia. She studied midwifery at the Royal South Sydney Women's Hospital in 1938.

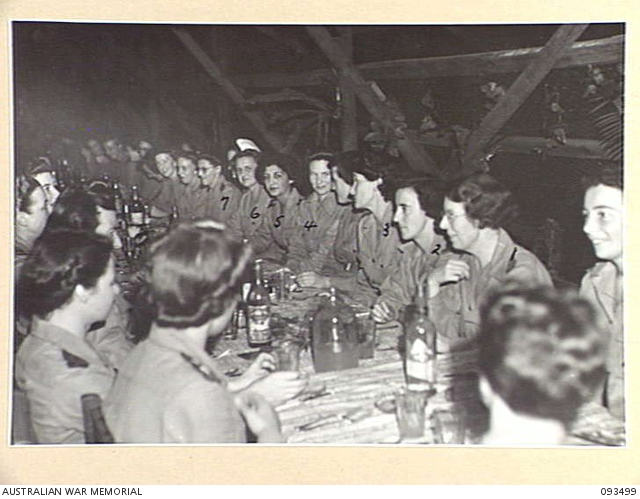
Australian Army Nursing Service sisters celebrating the 43rd anniversary of the Australian Army Nursing Service. Love on the right, labelled number 1

During World War II, Love was mobilised by the Australian Army Nursing Service on 11 August 1942 and was appointed as a lieutenant in the Second Australian Imperial Force. She served at with the 2/1st at the Australian General Hospital on Bougainville Island during the Bougainville campaign. She was transferred to the army reserve in September 1947.

In 1947, Love joined the New South Wales Midwives Association.

From 1949 to 1951, she lived in the United Kingdom, where she studied for the midwives teachers diploma issued by the British Central Midwives Board (now the Nursing and Midwifery Council) and worked at Queen Charlotte's Hospital, London, England, and the Simpson Memorial Maternity Pavilion, Edinburgh, Scotland.

After returning to Australia in 1951, Love worked at the maternity hospital Crown Street Women's Hospital in Surry Hills, overseeing the midwifery training. Love became Matron at Crown Street Hospital in 1963.

From 1956 to 1973, she sat on the Nurses’ Registration Board of New South Wales. She was also a member of the council of the New South Wales Bush Nursing Association and the Nurses’ Christian Movement (Fellowship) and the council of the Australasian Trained Nurses’ Association.

Love died of cardiovascular disease on 10 May 1990 in Mowll Village, Castle Hill, New South Wales, Australia.

== Honours ==
- Red Cross Distinguished Service Award (1961)
- Appointed to the Order of the British Empire (1974)
