= Judith Clements =

Australian oncologist

Professor Judith Clements AC FAHMS

Personal details
- Born: Judith Ann Clements
- Occupation: Medical researcher

Judith Ann Clements is an Australian academic and educator, specializing in Kallikrein proteases in prostate and ovarian cancers. Clements is the scientific director at the Australian Prostate Cancer Research Centre – Queensland and was head of the Cancer Research Program at the Institute of Health and Biomedical Innovation (IHBI) of Queensland University of Technology at the Translational Research Institute (Australia) from 1997 to 2014. Her biography was published in the Cancer and Metastasis Reviews in 2019

== Research ==
The Cancer Research Program led by Clements at QUT-IHBI, aims to more clearly understand the molecular and cellular basis for the development, progression, and metastasis of solid tumours.

Clements has commented on her research, stating:

"The primary interest of my group within the Hormone Dependent Cancer Program is the tissue kallikrein family of serine proteases. Our group was one of three worldwide that identified and characterised the expanded human tissue kallikrein gene locus on chromosome 19q13.4 in 1999. Since that time, our research has focused on defining the roles of particular kallikreins, and their variant forms, in hormone dependent cancers such as prostate, ovarian and endometrial cancer. We have used conventional/real time PCR and immunohistochemistry to determine the association of kallikrein expression with clinical disease to determine their usefulness as biomarkers for detection, prognostic outcome and therapeutic approaches. We are also utilizing over-expression and knockout systems to determine the effect of kallikrein expression in cancer cell lines at the cell biology level. Other studies in progress are directed to understanding the structure/function of the kallikreins, their substrate specificity and in vivo interacting proteins and genomic regulation. Other protease research interests are the type 2 trans membrane serine proteases (with Dr John Hooper) and the ADAMs (with Prof Adrian Herington and Dr Dimitri Odorico).

== Education ==
Clements completed her PhD in Endocrinology at Monash University in 1989, her Master of Applied Science in 1983, after completing her Bachelor of Applied Science in 1982 and Diploma of Laboratory Technology in 1969 at the Royal Melbourne Institute of Technology.

== Awards ==
- 2019 QLD Greats Premier Medal
- 2017 Fellow of the Australian Academy of Health and Medical Sciences
- 2015 Companion of the Order of Australia
- 2012 Women in Technology (WiT) Biotech Outstanding Achievement Award
- 2011 Queensland University of Technology Vice Chancellor's Award for Research Excellence
- 2007 Gold Medal, E.K.Frey–E.Werle Foundation for pioneering work in the Kallikrein field
- 2006 Research featured in "Ten Of The Best" National Health and Medical Research Council funded health and medical research successes
- 2005 Alban Gee Prize, Urological Society of Australasia Annual Scientific Meeting
- 2001 Queensland University of Technology Faculty of Science Distinguished Award for Excellence in Research
- 2000 National Health and Medical Research Council Principal Research Fellowship
- 2000 Silver Medal and Honorary Membership of the E.K.Frey–E.Werle Foundation (awarded at the International Conference, Kinin 2000, Munich)
- 1998 Alban Gee Prize, Urological Society of Australasia Annual Scientific Meeting
- 1995 National Health and Medical Research Council Senior Research Fellowship
- 1991 Prize for an "Outstanding Presentation", Kinin 91, International Conference on Kallikreins and Kinins, Munich, Germany.

== Publications ==
- Zhao, Hong, Dong, Ying, Quan, Jingjing, Smith, Robert, Lam, Alfred, Weinstein, Stephen, Clements, Judith, Johnson, Newell W., and Gao, Jin (2011) Correlation of the expression of human kallikrein-related peptidases 4 and 7 with the prognosis in oral squamous cell carcinoma. Head and Neck, 33 (4). pp. 566–572.
- Gao, Jin, Collard, Rachael L., Bui, Loan, Herington, Adrian C., Nicol, David L., and Clements, Judith A. (2007) Kallikrein 4 is a potential mediator of cellular interactions between cancer cells and osteoblasts in metastatic prostate cancer. Prostate, 67 (4). pp. 348–360.
