= Glenda Gobe =

Australian molecular biologist

Glenda Gobe is a molecular biologist specialising in the molecular controls of apoptosis in kidney disease. She is co-director of the Centre for Kidney Disease Research (CKDR), School of Medicine, Translational Research Institute and The University of Queensland, and Reader in the Discipline of Medicine at the School of Medicine, University of Queensland.

== Biography ==
Associate Professor Gobe is a molecular biologist in kidney disease research. She produced the first study, internationally, on the role of apoptosis in kidney disease.

== Education ==
Gobe completed her studies at the University of Queensland. Her studies included a Bachelor of Science, a Graduate Diploma of Education, and a Master of Science. She completed her PhD with Professors Roy Axelsen (analgesic nephropathy) and John Kerr (apoptosis) and received overseas post-doctoral training from the College of Physicians and Surgeons, Columbia University , with Prof Ralph Buttyan, one of the leading world experts in the molecular biology of apoptosis and specialising in prostate cancer research.

== Research ==
Gobe has extensive expertise in research into renal atrophy and regeneration, fibrosis, immunity and inflammation, and kidney cancer. She has designed in vitro and in vivo pre-clinical models to test hypotheses on the pathogenesis of kidney and other tissue disease, and promotes the translation of results to the clinic.

She has promoted the understanding of the role of apoptosis in cancer biology and general disease, and played an integral role in defining and characterising the role of apoptosis in kidney disease. Her current research focus is on the modulation of oxidative stress and mitochondrial dysfunction in renal disease, including renal cancer, and a systems biology approach to study chronic kidney disease.
