= Hilda Mary Hanton =

Australian hospital matron (1884–1954)

- Born: 23 June 1884; Yankalilla, South Australia, Australia
- Died: 14 April 1954 (aged 69); Toorak Gardens, Adelaide, South Australia, Australia
- Education: (later Royal) Adelaide Hospital
- Occupation: Hospital matron
- Employer: Adelaide's Memorial Hospital

Hilda Mary Hanton MBE (23 June 1884 – 14 April 1954) was an Australian hospital matron known for her long service at Adelaide's Memorial Hospital. She was President of the Australasian Trained Nurses' Association during the second world war.

== Life ==
Hanton was born in 1884 in Yankalilla, south of Adelaide. Her parents were Fannie (born Roach) and her husband Walter Hardy Hanton. Her father was a Wesleyan minister and she was the penultimate child of his five children.

Hanton gained a gold medal in 1917 in her exams when she qualified as a nurse after four years of training at the (later Royal) Adelaide Hospital. Within two years she was a charge nurse and she made her first application to be the first matron at the planned Adelaide Memorial Hospital. She was unsuccessful, but a similar application to a smaller 20-bed hospital at Renmark gained her the title of matron. Meanwhile the Methodist church opened the thirty bed Adelaide Memorial Hospital and she became its matron in June 1922. She continued her own training and she passed the Australasian Trained Nurses' Association's exams as an obstetric nurse in 1924.

Hanton's sister had been a semi-invalid and she had cared for her when she was young. Now as a matron she made close relationships with invalids, who were at the hospital for some time. She also bonded with new mothers as she cared for them after the births which she had attended. She imposed high standards on her nurses and that included the trainees. The hospital's four years of training for nurses was approved by the South Australia's Nurses Board. The Methodist community had originally built the Memorial Hospital to remember the lives lost in the war, but also as a place where women could train to be nurses in a Christian atmosphere. Hanton's staff appreciated her fairness and organisation and they respected her.

The war created shortages of funding and of nurses. In 1941 she was elected to be the President of the Australasian Trained Nurses' Association and she served through the second world war until 1945. During her time at the hospital the number of beds increased by a factor of four. In 1946 she resigned for health reasons. She was replaced by Kathleen "Kay" Parker who had spent years as a prisoner of the Japanese. In 1948 Hanton was made a Member of The Most Excellent Order of the British Empire. Hanton died in her home in the Adelaide suburb of Toorak Gardens in 1954.
