= Health Translation Queensland =

Australian research institute

- Formerly: Brisbane Diamantina Health Partners
- Industry: Healthcare
- Founded: 2014; 12 years ago
- Headquarters: Brisbane, Australia
- Website: healthtranslationqld.org.au

Health Translation Queensland, formerly Brisbane Diamantina Health Partners, is the first Advanced Health Research Translation Centre in Queensland, Australia.

== History ==
Health Translation Queensland's history dates back to 2011, with the establishment of the Mayne Health Science Alliance and Diamantina Health Partners. In 2014, these two bodies came together with Children's Health Queensland in a collaborative arrangement to form the Brisbane Diamantina Health Partners Academic Health Science System.

The founding partners were Metro North Hospital and Health Service, Metro South Hospital and Health Service, Children’s Health Queensland Hospital and Health Service, Mater Health Services, The University of Queensland, Queensland University of Technology, the Translational Research Institute and the QIMR Berghofer Medical Research Institute.

On 9 June 2017, it was announced Brisbane Diamantina Health Partners had been accredited by the National Health and Medical Research Council as a new Advanced Health Research and Translation Centre.

BDHP changed its name to Health Translation Queensland in November 2021.

== Partners ==
The organisation is a collaboration between four local Hospital and Health Services (public hospital networks), two universities, two medical research institutes, a primary health care network, and Queensland Health.

The participants are:

- Children’s Health Queensland
- Mater Health
- Metro North Health
- Metro South Health
- QIMR Berghofer
- Queensland University of Technology
- The University of Queensland
- Translational Research Institute
- Queensland Health
- Brisbane South Primary Health Network

== Events ==
=== Brisbane Cancer Conference ===
The BDHP Brisbane Cancer Conference is held annually in December at the Brisbane Convention & Exhibition Centre. The conference is convened by Professor Ken O’Byrne, Clinical Director of the Cancer and Ageing Research Program.

=== Blood Cancers Group Seminar Series ===
The BDHP Blood Cancers Group Seminar Series is held once a month, alternating between the Translational Research Institute on the Princess Alexandra Hospital campus and the QIMR Berghofer Medical Research Institute on the Royal Brisbane and Women's Hospital campus. Presentations are given by local, national and international researchers, providing an opportunity to hear about the latest research and encourage greater collaboration within and between research streams. The series is convened by Professor Andrew Perkins, co-leader of the Blood and Bone Diseases Program, Mater Research Institute – University of Queensland.

=== Circulating Tumour Cell Symposium ===
The BDHP Circulating Tumour Cell Symposium was a single day event that provided up to date coverage of many aspects of tumour research. The event was co-convened by Professor Colleen Nelson, Executive Director of the Australian Prostate Cancer Research Centre-Queensland, and Professor Rik Thompson, of Queensland University of Technology's Institute of Health and Biomedical Innovation. The symposium was attended by some 130 delegates from Queensland University of Technology, The University of Queensland and Griffith Universities, affiliated research institutes, QLD Health, industry and consumer advocacy group representatives, as well as attendees from Victoria, New South Wales, Western Australia and South Australia.
