= Princess Alexandra Hospital, Brisbane =

Hospital in Brisbane, Queensland, Australia

Princess Alexandra Hospital
- Queensland Health, Government of Queensland
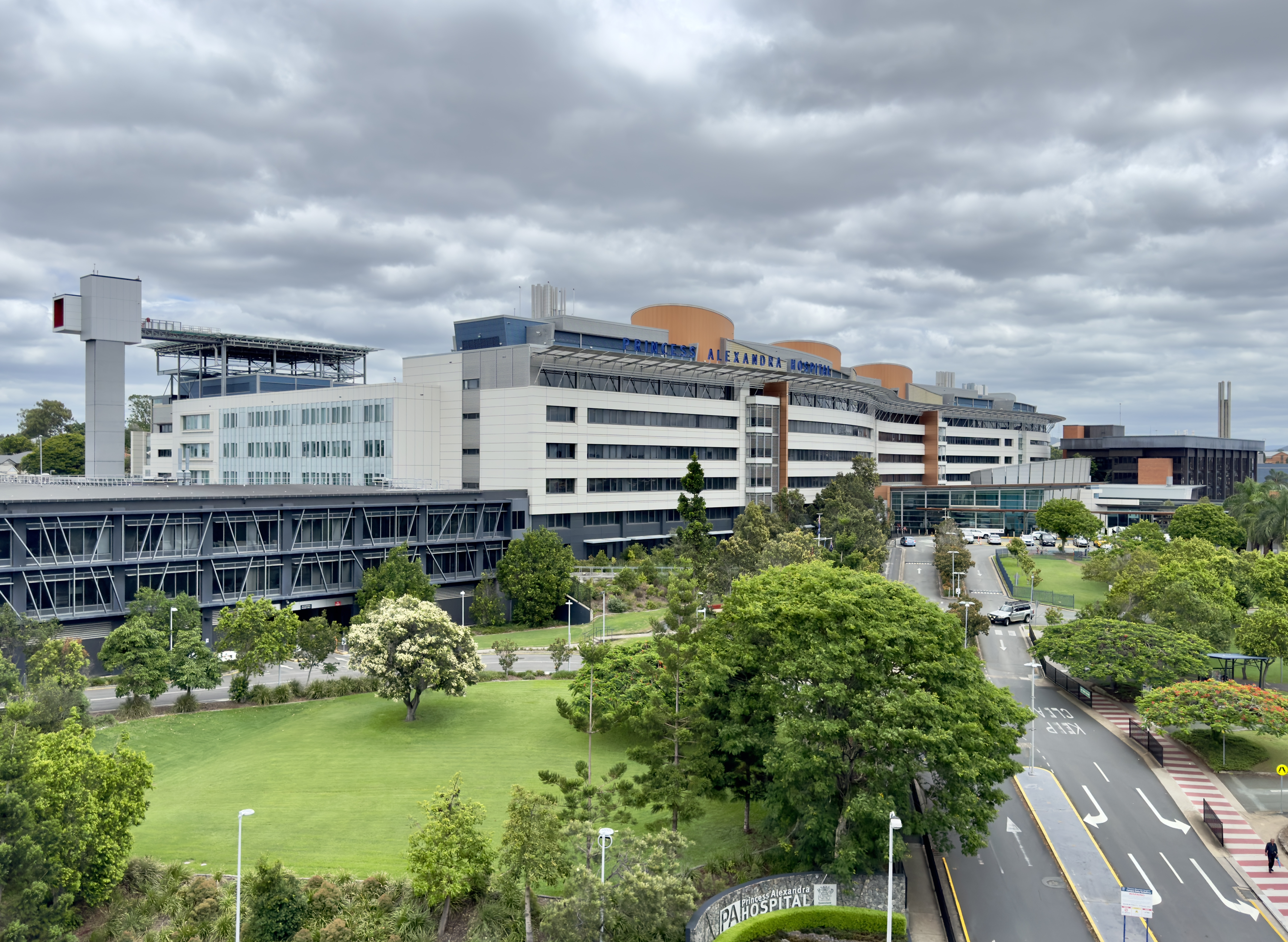
- Main entrance

Geography
- Location: Ipswich Road, Woolloongabba, Brisbane, Queensland, Australia
- Coordinates: 27°29′57″S 153°02′00″E

Organisation
- Type: Teaching hospital; Tertiary
- Affiliated university: University of Queensland
- Network: Metro South, Queensland Health

Services
- Beds: 1038

Helipads
- Helipad: ICAO : YPRI
Number	Length		Surface
Number	ft	m	Surface
1			aluminium

History
- Founded: 1959

Links
- Website: metrosouth.health.qld.gov.au
- Lists: Hospitals in Australia

The Princess Alexandra Hospital (PAH) is a major Australian teaching hospital of the University of Queensland, located in Brisbane, Queensland. It is a tertiary level teaching hospital with all major medical and surgical specialities onsite except for obstetrics, gynaecology, paediatrics, and medical genetics. It has a catchment population of 1.6 million people with 1038 beds and 5,800 full-time equivalent staff. In 2005, the hospital received Magnet Recognition.

The hospital is located on Ipswich Road in Woolloongabba, an inner-city suburb of Brisbane.

== History ==
The hospital is built on the site of the 1883 Diamantina Orphanage, named after Diamantina Bowen, wife of the first Governor of Queensland, and the former Queensland School for the Deaf, which closed in 1988. In 1901, it became Diamantina Hospital for Chronic Diseases. In 1943, it became the South Brisbane Auxiliary Hospital and then the South Brisbane Hospital in 1956.

In 1959, it became the Princess Alexandra Hospital and was opened by and named after HRH Princess Alexandra, to mark the Centennial of Queensland. In 2000, a new building was opened to replace the ageing red-brick hospital complex built in the 1950s. The current emergency department is situated on the site of the former nurses' quarters building, while the demolished pathology wing was located at the front of the campus off Ipswich Road.

Major milestones for the hospital included: opening of its first short-stay medical assessment unit in 1960, dialysis unit in 1963, ICU in 1964 (which was a 12-bed bay in the operating theatre recovery area), spinal unit in 1965, renal transplant unit in 1969, and coronary care unit in 1971.

== Electronic health records ==
It was the first hospital in Queensland to be fully digitised in 2016, a process led by Dr Stephen Ayre, a former general practitioner, who was then the executive director.

== Units ==
Queensland's spinal injuries unit and the liver and kidney transplantation services are based at the hospital. The Cardiothoracic Surgery Unit opened in 1998. In the following years the unit performed more than 10,000 operations.

=== Emergency department expansion ===
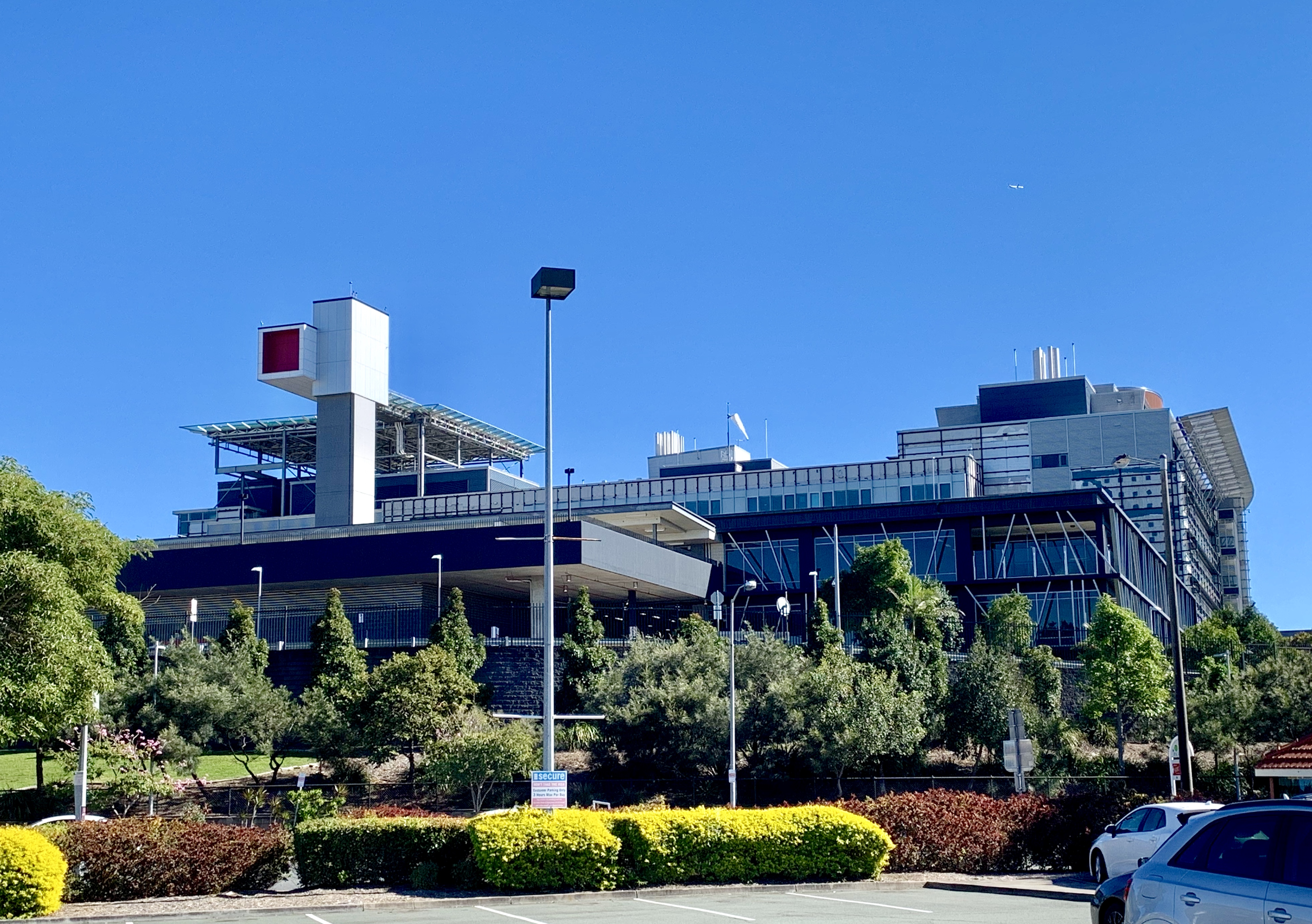
Hospital grounds and helipad, 2019

From 2009 to 2011 major expansion works were undertaken, including the doubling in size of the emergency department, the construction of a helipad with express elevators, and new oncology bunkers for cancer treatment.

== Centres ==
The P.A. Hospital Foundation is located at the Princess Alexandra Hospital. The foundation raises money for medical research on the P.A. Hospital campus. In April 2008, the Diamantina Institute for Cancer, Immunology and Metabolic Medicine was opened at the hospital. In July 2011, the Diamantina Health Partners, Queensland's first academic health science centre, was opened. The Diamantina Health Partners head office is located within the Translational Research Institute on the P.A. Hospital campus. In mid-2014, the Diamantina Health Partners joined with the Mayne Health Science Alliance and Children's Health Queensland to form the Brisbane Diamantina Health Partners Academic Health Science System, also housed within the Translational Research Institute on the Princess Alexandra Hospital campus. The hospital is the state centre of excellence for renal transplant, liver transplant, trauma surgery and spinal injuries.

== Transport ==
The PA Hospital can be accessed by the dedicated PA Hospital busway station, the Buranda busway station, the Dutton Park Railway Station and by buses on Ipswich Road or Cornwall Street. A taxi rank is also located on Ipswich Road. In March 2008 a new 1400 bay car park was opened to service visitors and staff parking needs.

== See also ==
- Healthcare in Australia
- Lists of hospitals
- List of hospitals in Australia
