= Australasian Trained Nurses' Association =

Assoc of Australasian Trained Nurses

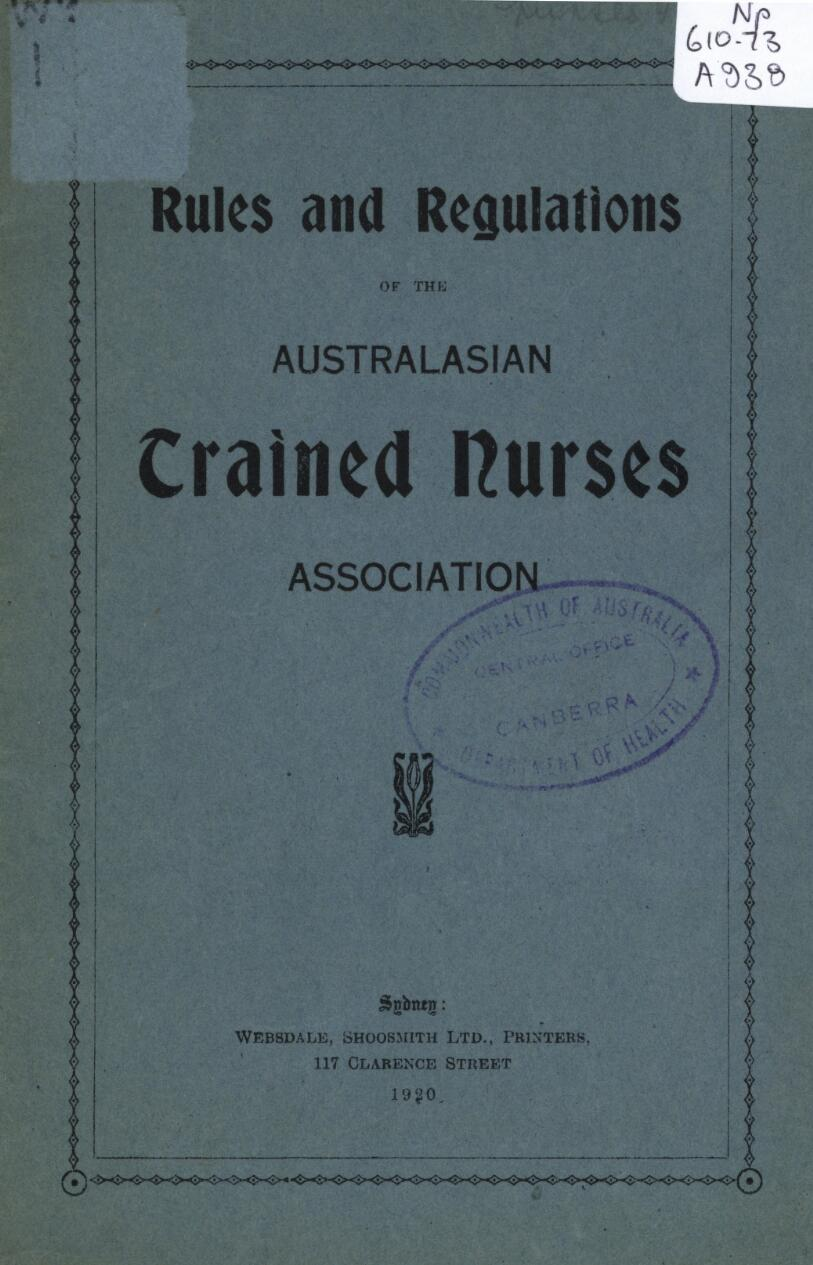
- Abbreviation: ATNA
- Formation: December 1899; 126 years ago
- Founder: Susan McGahey and Margaret Farquharson

The Australasian Trained Nurses' Association was an association formed in 1899 to register nurses who had been trained in Australia.

== History ==
Susan McGahey was a co-founder of the Australasian Trained Nurses' Association (ATNA) in December 1899 which was briefly named the Australian Trained Nurses' Association. She had posted a newspaper advert asking for people interested in forming an association to register trained nurses to meet with her. Frederick Norton Manning was one of several doctors involved with the early organisation and he became the association's first President

According to Russell the original idea for the ATNA began with a proposal from two matrons, Matron Susan McGahey of Royal Prince Alfred Hospital, Sydney and Matron Martha Farquharson who was from 1890 to 1895 Matron at Melbourne's Alfred Hospital, and from 1895 to 1900 Matron at the Melbourne Hospital.

At the meeting on 26 May 1899 to form the ATNA a provisional committee comprising seven matrons Matron Susan McGahey of RAPH; Matron Frances Georginia Spencer of Parramatta Hospital for the Insane and later Thomas Walker Convalescent Hospital; (Ellen Julie) Nellie Gould matron of the Hospital for the Insane at Rydalmere; Mrs Joseph; Mrs James Graham (née Fanny Millard), Matron of the Benevolent Asylum, and medical personnel including Dr Sir (knighted 1901) James Graham, Dr Chubbe, Dr Thomas Fiaschi, Dr Mills, Dr Thring and Dr Purser. The original committee also included six sisters and nurses: Miss Davis?, Miss Rebecca Godson, Lady Superintendent 'Green' Home, Sydney, Miss Maria F Sanders, Senior Sister, Prince Alfred Hospital, Sydney, Sydney, Miss Alice May Ryrie, Matron Craigend Private Hospital, Sydney, and Miss Wilson.

The state of Victoria had solved the same problem of registering trained nurses by creating an organisation modelled on the that used in the UK, but other states followed the ATNA model. In 1904 Florence Chatfield presided over the inaugural meeting of a branch in Queensland. She and her life partner, Ellen Barron, were to be leading supporters of that branch. Between 1904 and 1908, South Australia, Western Australia and Tasmania all formed local ATNA associations (in that order). The organisation in Victoria continued, but it was on good terms with the ATNA.

In 1903 the association launched its own journal titled The Australasian Nurses' Journal with McGahey as the editor. By this point the aims of the association were laid out. The association had been formed to create a register of trained nurses but it also intended to oversee the appointments of matrons, to create a register of hospitals that trained nurses and to try and establish a minimum standard for a nurses training.

The first paid secretary, Evelyn Paget Evans, of the Australasian Trained Nurses Association was appointed in 1917. She was also the General secretary of the Australian Physiotherapy Association.

The Australian Nursing Federation was formed in 1924.

The Royal Alexandra Hospital for Children's matron Rosa Angela Kirkcaldie was the President from 1932 to 1933. Hilda Mary Hanton served as the ATNA President from 1941 to 1945. Doris Bardsley became the president of the ATNA in 1951. From 1954 to 1956 Joan Stevenson Abbott was the President and she resigned when she found that she could not improve nurses' working conditions.

== Notable members include ==
- Joan Stevenson Abbott – Australian nursing sister and army matron (1899–1975)
- Ellen Barron – Australian nurse (1875–1951)
- Jane Bell – Scotland-born Australian nurse and midwife (1873–1959)
- Isla Stuart Blomfield – Australian nurse (1865–1959)
- Hilda Mary Hanton – Australian hospital matron (1884–1954)
- Kate Hill – Australian nurse (1859–1933)
- Clara Winifred Howie – Australian nurse and administrator (1881–1960)
- Ida Dorothy Love – Australian nurse and midwifery educator
- Betty Lyons (1921–1986)
- Norah Martin – Mother superior and hospital nurse (1888–1977)
- Gertrude Mead – Australian medical practitioner (1867–1919)
- Edna Shaw – Australian hospital matron (1891–1974) OBE
- Dora Sweetapple – Australian nurse (1872–1972), founding member, employed by the City of Adelaide.
- May Yarrowick – Australian mid-wife and nurse (1876–1949), and first Aboriginal person to be registered as a nurse.
