= Walter Hill (garden curator) =

British/Australian botanist

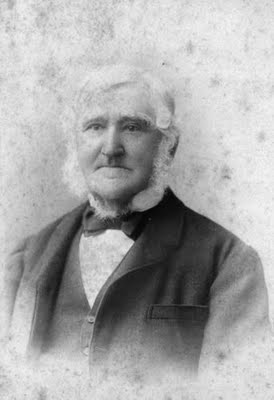
- Born: 31 December 1819; Scotsdyke, Dumfriesshire, Scotland
- Died: 4 February 1904 (aged 84); Brisbane, Queensland, Australia
- Spouse: Jane Smith (m. 1849)

Walter Hill (1819–1904) was a Scottish-born Australian botanist and horticulturalist, and first curator of the Brisbane Botanic Gardens at Gardens Point in Brisbane, Australia.

== Personal life ==
Walter Hill was born at Scotsdyke, Dumfriesshire, Scotland, on 31 December 1819, the son of David Hill and Elizabeth Beattie. Scotsdyke is virtually on the border of England and Scotland, and is presumably a reference to the moat about 1 kilometre (0.62 mi) south of the village of Canobie (now spelled Canonbie).

Hill married Jane Smith, the daughter of John Smith and Jane Brunton, on 16 September 1849 at Holy Trinity Brompton Church, Middlesex, England. They had a daughter Ann (born 25 April 1850 in England, died 1 November 1871 in Brisbane).

The family immigrated to Sydney, Australia in 1852 on the Maitland, where Hill initially tried his luck on the goldfields. In 1854, Hill undertook an expedition (as a botanist) to North Queensland in which most of the party were murdered by Aborigines. After this, Walter accepted the position of superintendent of the Brisbane Botanic Gardens.

The death of their only daughter, Ann, in 1871 was tragic for Hill and Jane. She was buried in Toowong Cemetery, despite it not yet being opened for burials. However, Governor Samuel Blackall had already been buried there prior to its opening and Ann's burial was the 2nd of six burials that preceded the official openings. Hill planted a hoop pine near Ann's grave and did a number of other plantings in the cemetery, despite having no apparent official role in connection with it. It appears he was simply motivated to make her burial ground a beautiful place.

Until Hill's retirement in 1881, the family lived in the Curator's Cottage at the Brisbane Botanic Gardens. This cottage was washed away in the 1890s in a flood and was replaced by the Curator's Cottage which exists today as the City Gardens Cafe, a venue well-patronised by tourists and staff of the adjacent Queensland University of Technology's Gardens Point campus.

After retiring, Hill established a new home "Canobie Lea" at Eight Mile Plains, Queensland, which was (perhaps unsurprisingly) well known for its landscaping. Canobie is a village in Dumfriesshire close to Hill's birthplace of Scotsdyke.

He died at his home "Canobie Lea" on 4 February 1904. He is buried in Toowong Cemetery together with his wife Jane (died 1888) in the same grave as their daughter Ann (died 1871).

As his wife and only child pre-deceased him, Hill's niece, Mrs Mary Hamilton (daughter of Hill's brother David Hall) appears to have inherited "Canobie Lea". The Hamiltons restored the house, replacing the shingle roof with a tin roof. Mary died in 1921 and in 1931, the property was sold.

== Professional life in horticulture ==
=== Early career ===
Hill started out as an apprentice to his brother, David, then head gardener at Balloch Castle, Dunbartonshire, Scotland. Later, he worked at the Royal Botanic Garden Edinburgh and then in 1843 moved to the Royal Botanic Gardens, Kew.

=== Brisbane Botanic Gardens ===
Hill was the first Superintendent of the Brisbane Botanic Gardens located at Gardens Point from 1855 to 1881. After his appointment, he made rapid progress in establishing the gardens, which he organised into 34 separate areas, each with a specific purpose. In the spring of 1856, the newspaper Moreton Bay Courier urged the local citizens to come and enjoy the gardens and walkways, giving praise to Hill for achieving so much so quickly.

In late 1859, Hill worked very diligently to prepare the gardens for the arrival of Sir George Bowen, Queensland's first governor, as the gardens had been chosen as the landing stage for the ship which conveyed the governor and his family and also as focus for many of the associated ceremonies and festivities.

In 1861, he worked with the Governor's wife, Lady Diamantina Bowen, to organise Christmas festivities in the gardens, personally decorating the Christmas trees.

Although his interests primarily lay in economic plants, he also took an interest in more decorative plants. In 1857, he exhibited a native water lily at the Australian Horticultural and Agricultural Show held in Sydney.

He introduced the flowering trees, the jacaranda and poinciana, which are still popular garden plants in Queensland. Indeed, it is claimed that all jacaranda trees in Australia are descended from the original jacaranda tree that grew from a seed imported by Hill in 1864. The tree is believed to the subject of the 1903 painting Under the Jacaranda by Richard Godfrey Rivers (Queensland Art Gallery); the tree died in 1980 when it was blown over in a storm.

=== Colonial botanist ===
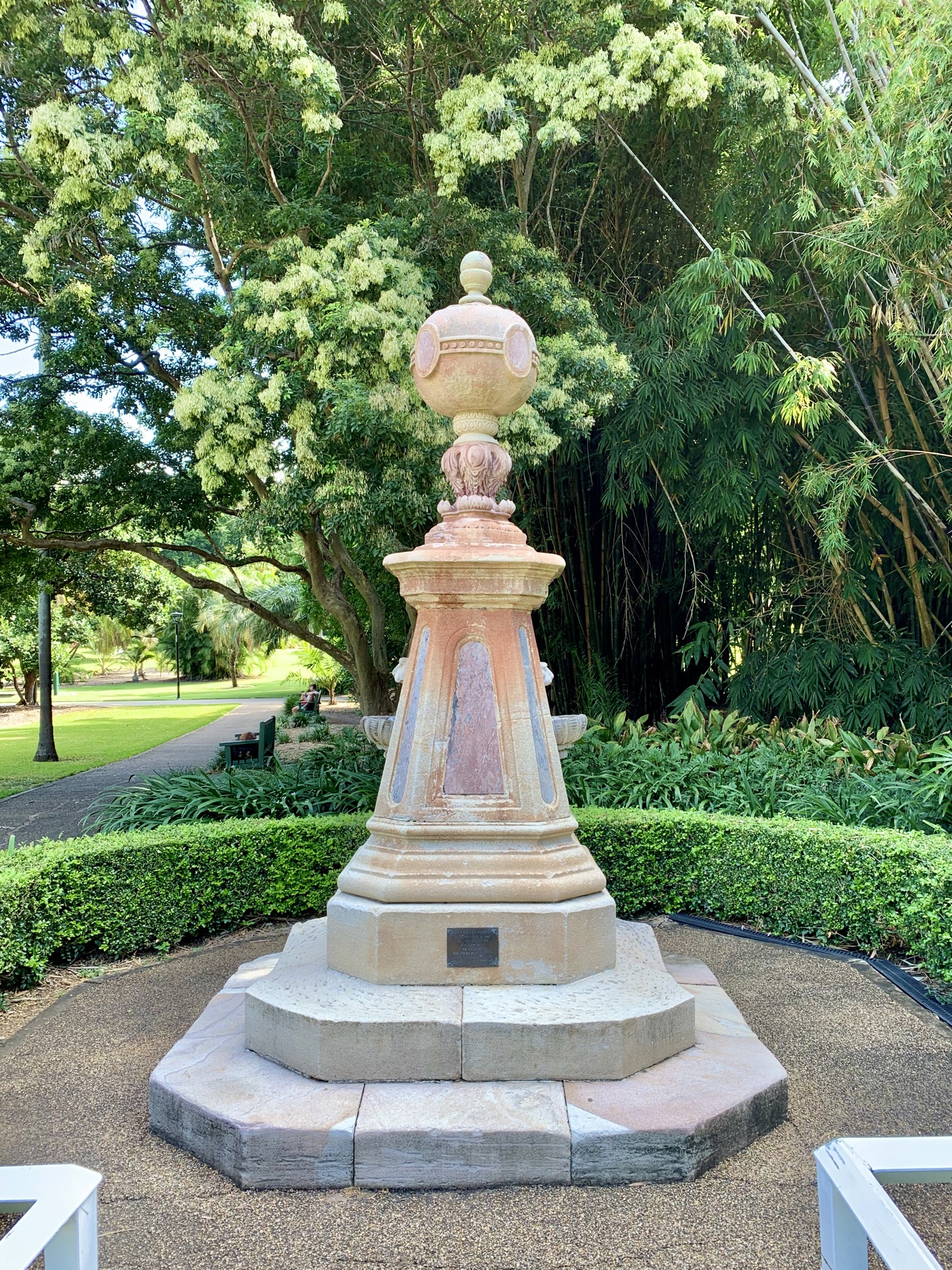
Walter Hill Fountain in City Botanic Gardens, Brisbane, Queensland, 2020

When Queensland was separated from New South Wales in 1859, Hill was appointed the first Colonial Botanist of Queensland in 1859, a role he held until his retirement in 1881.

In this role, he conducted a number of expeditions to northern Queensland to collect native plants, including trips to Cape York Peninsula in 1862 and the north-east coast to Mossman and the Daintree River in 1873, climbing Mount Bellenden Ker.

He sent many of the specimens he gathered to herbariums around the world (including the Royal Botanic Gardens, Melbourne and Royal Botanic Gardens, Kew in London). Although Hill wanted to establish a herbarium in Queensland, he was unable to do so due to lack of a suitable building and the other demands on his time. However, on his retirement in 1881, Hill gave his books to the Queensland Museum, which later became the nucleus of the present Queensland Herbarium library.

Hill also had a significant role in acclimatisation of exotic plant species into Queensland. He was also responsible for the introduction of mango, pawpaw, ginger, tamarind, arrowroot, cotton and mahogany. In particular, he introduced sugarcane. He established through experiments that the juice of the Queensland-grown sugarcane could be successfully granulated, opening up a major new farming crop for Queensland.

Conversely, he also cultivated an Australian native nut, the Queensland nut, or macadamia.

In 1862, Hill was appointed as one of Queensland's Commissioners to arrange for produce and other articles to be exhibited in the Exhibition of Industry as part of the 1862 International Exhibition held in London.

=== Retirement ===
Hill retired in 1881. However, he continued to experiment with fruit trees in his retirement.

== Memorials ==
Hill is memorialised in a number of ways, including the Walter Hill Fountain. The Walter Hill Fountain is located in the Brisbane City Botanic Gardens and was built as a drinking fountain in 1867 when mains water was introduced to Brisbane. In 1972, the fountain was renamed to commemorate Hill's achievements.
