= Tagore Trajano =

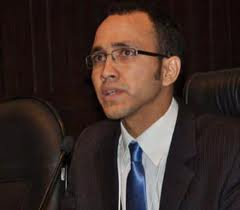

Personal details
- Born: Salvador da Bahia, Bahia, BR

Tagore Trajano de Almeida Silva, born in Salvador, Bahia, Brazil, is a lawyer and professor; he works in the field of study called Animal Rights. In 2010 he was elected president of the Animal Abolitionist Institute, an institution that has developed the Brazilian Abolitionist Movement for Animal liberation.

Currently, he is an adjunct professor of the Federal University of Bahia, where he teaches the Environmental Law Course for undergraduate and postgraduate studies (Master's and Doctoral Degree).

== Life and career ==
Tagore Trajano got his postdoctorate at Pace Law School, Ph.D in the Federal University of Bahia, Brazil. During his studies, he specialized in the field of animal, constitution and environmental law, revisiting the General Theory of Law to include non-human beings in the sphere of legal consideration.

During his master's studies, he studied with Professor David Favre, a visiting scholar at Michigan State University, an institution that would become central to the online publication of the Brazilian Animal Rights Review, which coordinates with Professor Heron Gordilho and Luciano Santana. As a result of these researches he published the book: Animals in Court, which discussed the subject of law, legal personality and capacity, demonstrating, through an evolutionary interpretation, the ability of animals to be considered legal subjects

In 2013, he defended his Ph.D. thesis under the title: Animal Law and Legal Education, highlighting the need for the creation of a chair of animal law in law schools as a way of overcoming the crisis in the current legal paradigm.

== International relations ==
"Brazilian Animal Law Overview: Balancing Human and Non-Human Interests" was the author's first international text. Published in the renowned Michigan State University Journal, "Journal of Animal Law," in 2010, the professor describes the way Brazilian law treats animals, highlighting the main antecedents of Brazilian courts and predicting a change of posture On the part of the operators of the right after the promulgation of the Constitution of 1988.

Origins and Development of Teaching Animal Law in Brazil published in the Pace Environmental Law Review, the Brazilian doctrine on Animal Law was presented to foreign institutions, collaborating with The beginning of the debate on the necessity of the teaching of the subject in the faculties of law in Brazil. Since then, courses on the subject began to be inserted in the curricula of the Brazilian faculties, becoming a reality in Brazilian legal education. Today, faculties such as: Federal University of Bahia, Federal University of Rio de Janeiro, Federal University of Santa Maria and others already teach Animal Law.

== Conferences on Bioethics and Animal Rights ==
Since 2008, Tagore Trajano has been collaborating with the organization and diffusion of the theme, alternating every two years the World Congress on Bioethics and Animal Rights, as well as the Brazilian Congress on Bioethics and Animal Rights' .

Both events have over the years brought together hundreds of people, students and professors in different capitals to discuss important issues related to the legal status of living beings and their repercussion in today's post-humanist society.

=== Publications ===
- TRAJANO, Tagore. The Constitutional Defense of Animals in Brazil. In: CAO, Debarah; WHITE, Steven. (Org.). Animal Law and Welfare - International Perspectives. 1ed.New York: Springer, 2016, v. 53, p. 181-193.

- SILVA, T. T. A. ou TRAJANO, Tagore. Direito Animal e ensino jurídico: formação e autonomia de um saber pós-humanista. 1. ed. Salvador: Evolução, 2014. 331p .

- SILVA, T. T. A. ou TRAJANO, Tagore . Animais em juízo: direito, personalidade jurídica e capacidade processual. 1. ed. Salvador: Evolução, 2012. 232p .

=== Articles ===
- MARINS, R. M. M. B.; MACHADO, C. A. A.; SILVA, T.T.A. . Por uma ética fraternal na Contemporaneidade: uma nova leitura das relações jurídicas. Revista Jurídico Luso Brasileira, v. 03, p. 605-627, 2017.

- GORDILHO, Heron J. S.; SILVA, T.T.A.; RAVAZZANO, F. . Animais e a Hermenêutica Constitucional Abolicionista. Revista Acadêmica - Faculdade de Direito do Recife, v. 88, p. 120-144, 2016.

- SILVA, T.T.A.; VIEIRA, L. C. A. . A Inconstitucionalidade da Vaquejada: uma análise da dignidade animal sobre a ADI nº 4983 e a lei estadual nº 15.299/13. Amazon's Research and Environmental Law, v. 04, p. 42-60, 2016.

- MENESES, R. C. C.; SILVA, T.T.A. . O Especismo Como Argumento Filosófico da Não Aceitação do Animal Como Sujeito de Direitos. Revista de Biodireito e Direito dos Animais, v. 02, p. 218-234, 2016.

- TRAJANO, Tagore. Direito Animal e Pós-Humanismo: Formação e Autonomia de um Saber Pós-Humanista. Revista Jurídica Luso Brasileira, v. 02, p. 2001-2066, 2015.

- BRAZ, L.C.F.S.; SILVA, T.T.A. . O Processo de Coisificação Animal Decorrente da Teoria Contratualista Racionalista e a Necessária Ascensão de Um Novo Paradigma. Revista Brasileira de Direito, v. 11, p. 44-52, 2015.

- OLIVEIRA, I. M.; SILVA, T. T. A. ou TRAJANO, Tagore; LIMA, K. J. M. . A imolação nas liturgias de matriz africana: reflexões sobre colisão entre liberdade religiosa e proteção dos direitos dos animais não-humanos. Revista do Programa de Pós-Graduação em Direito da Universidade Federal da Bahia, v. 25, p. 285-314, 2015.

- TRAJANO, Tagore. Princípios de proteção animal na Constituição de 1988. Revista de Direito Brasileira, v. 11, p. 62-105, 2015.

- SILVA, T. T. A. ou TRAJANO, Tagore . Brazilian Animal Law Overview: Balancing Human And Non-Human Interests. In: David Favre. (Org.). Journal of Animal Law. East Lansing: Michigan State University College of Law, 2010, v. 06, p. 81-104.

- GORDILHO, Heron José de Santana; SILVA, T. T. A. ou TRAJANO, Tagore . Animais em juízo: direito, personalidade jurídica e capacidade processual. Revista de Direito Ambiental, v. 65, p. 333-363, 2012.

- GORDILHO, Heron José de Santana; SILVA, T. T. A. ou TRAJANO, Tagore . Habeas Corpus para os grandes primatas. Revista do Instituto do Direito Brasileiro da Faculdade de Direito da Universidadede Lisboa - RIDB, v. 04, p. 2077-2114, 2012.

- SILVA, T. T. A. ou TRAJANO, Tagore; LANGERHORST, Victor Vendramini; BRAGA, Sérgio Waxman. . Fundamentos do direito animal constitucional. Revista Brasileira de Direito Animal, v. 10, p. 235-276, 2012.

- SILVA, T. T. A. ou TRAJANO, Tagore . Introdução aos direitos dos animais. Revista de Direito Ambiental, v. 62, p. 141-168, 2011.

- SILVA, T. T. A. ou TRAJANO, Tagore; GORDILHO, Heron José de Santana . Eficácia dos direitos fundamentais e justiça distributiva: o interesse público como problema jurídico nos tratamentos de saúde. Jurispoiesis (Rio de Janeiro), v. 14, p. 149-176, 2011.

- SILVA, T. T. A. ou TRAJANO, Tagore . Constitucionalização dos direitos dos animais. Revista da Faculdade de Direito (Faculdade Maurício de Nassau), v. 05, p. 217-236, 2010.

- SILVA, T. T. A. ou TRAJANO, Tagore . Antivivisseccionismo e direito animal: em direção a uma nova ética na pesquisa científica. Revista de Direito Ambiental, v. 53, p. 261-311, 2009.

- SILVA, T. T. A. ou TRAJANO, Tagore . Capacidade de ser parte Dos Animais Não-Humanos: Repensando os Institutos da Substituição e Representação Processual. Revista Brasileira de Direito Animal, v. 05, p. 267-296, 2009.

- SILVA, T. T. A. ou TRAJANO, Tagore . A Lei Arouca: ainda continuamos a realizar pesquisas com animais. Pensata Animal, v. 17, p. 01-06, 2008.

- SILVA, T. T. A. ou TRAJANO, Tagore . Direito animal e hermenêutica jurídica da mudança:a inserção da linguagem dos movimentos sociais em um novo significado jurídico. Revista Brasileira de Direito Animal, v. 04, p. 247-264, 2008.

- SILVA, T. T. A. ou TRAJANO, Tagore; SOUZA, A. S. . APROPRIAÇÃO DOS ESPAÇOS PÚBLICOS DURANTE O CARNAVAL DE SALVADOR (SSA), BAHIA, BRASIL Síntese das Desigualdades Sociais. Revista jurídica dos formandos em direito da UFBA, v. 11, p. 359-383, 2008.

- SILVA, T. T. A. ou TRAJANO, Tagore; NORONHA. Ceci Vilar . Formas de violência extralegal: linhamentos e execuções sumárias. Revista do Cepej, v. 08, p. 355-369, 2007.

- SILVA, T. T. A. ou TRAJANO, Tagore . Direito animal e os paradigmas de Thomas Kuhn: Reforma ou revolução científica na teoria do direito?. Revista Brasileira de Direito Animal, v. 03, p. 239-270, 2007.

- SILVA, T. T. A. ou TRAJANO, Tagore; SANTANA. Heron José; SANTANA. Luciano Rocha; VIDA. Samuel Santana . Habeas Corpus em favor da Chimpanzé Suíça. Revista Brasileira de Direito Ambiental, v. 04, p. 225-247, 2005.
