= Endorsements in the 2023 Australian Indigenous Voice referendum =

Many politicians, public figures, media outlets, businesses and other organisations endorsed voting either in favour or against the proposed Indigenous Voice to Parliament in the lead-up to the 2023 Australian Indigenous Voice referendum, which was held on 14 October.

== Yes campaign ==
=== Lead lobby groups ===
- The Uluru Dialogue (2017), a collective which includes creators of the Uluru Statement from the Heart, along with various academics and lawyers based at the University of New South Wales; chaired by Megan Davis and Pat Anderson
- From the Heart (2020); operates under the auspices of Noel Pearson's Cape York Institute in North Queensland
- Uphold and Recognise (2015), founded by lawyer Damien Freeman and Coalition spokesperson on Indigenous Australians, Julian Leeser (who is no longer with the group); a centre-right approach; chaired by Sean Gordon, who was co-convenor of Liberals for Yes and has been a member of the First Nations Referendum Working Group; includes former Indigenous Australians minister Ken Wyatt as a board member
- Australians for Indigenous Constitutional Recognition, a group of prominent Australians co-chaired by the director of the Business Council of Australia, Danny Gilbert, and Aboriginal filmmaker Rachel Perkins; board members include Noel Pearson and Tony Nutt, former principal adviser to prime minister John Howard
- Parliamentary friends of the Uluru Statement (launched on 13 February 2023), a non-partisan group co-chaired by Labor's Gordon Reid; Liberal Bridget Archer; and Independent Allegra Spender
- Liberals for Yes, a group of people who support Liberal Party values but also support the Voice; co-convened by Sean Gordon

=== Politicians ===
==== Federal ====
- All federal parliamentary members of the Australian Labor Party and the Greens unless otherwise noted.
- The following members of the federal parliamentary Liberal Party:
  - Bridget Archer, member for Bass
  - Andrew Bragg, senator for New South Wales
  - Julian Leeser, member for Berowra; former shadow attorney-general and shadow minister for Indigenous Affairs (2022–2023)
- The following independents:
  - Kate Chaney, member for Curtin
  - Zoe Daniel, member for Goldstein
  - Andrew Gee, member for Calare
  - Helen Haines, member for Indi
  - David Pocock, senator for the Australian Capital Territory
  - Sophie Scamps, member for Mackellar
  - Kylea Tink, member for North Sydney
  - Allegra Spender, member for Wentworth
  - Zali Steggall, member for Warringah
  - Monique Ryan, member for Kooyong
  - Andrew Wilkie, member for Clark
- The following former prime ministers:
  - Paul Keating, former Labor prime minister (1991–1996)
  - Kevin Rudd, former Labor prime minister (2007–2010; 2013)
  - Julia Gillard, former Labor prime minister (2010–2013)
  - Malcolm Turnbull, former Liberal prime minister (2015–2018)
- The following former federal ministers:
  - Julie Bishop, former Minister for Foreign Affairs (2013–2018), Minister for Education and Science and Minister for Women (2006–2007), Minister for Ageing (2003–2006) and Deputy Leader of Liberal Party.
  - Bob Carr, former premier of New South Wales (1995–2005), Minister for Foreign Affairs (2012–2013) and leader of the NSW Labor Party (1988–2005)
  - Ken Wyatt, former Minister for Indigenous Australians (2019–2022), Minister for Senior Australians and Aged Care and Minister for Indigenous Health (2017–2019)
  - Graham Richardson, former Minister for the Environment (1987–1990, 1994), Minister for Health (1993–1994), Minister for Transport and Communications (1991–1992), and Minister for Social Security (1990–1991)
- The following other former federal politicians:
  - John Hewson, former Leader of the Opposition and Leader of the Liberal Party (1990–1994)
  - Fiona Martin, former member for Reid (2019–2022)

==== State and territory ====
- The following current and former premiers and chief ministers:
  - Jacinta Allan, Premier of Victoria and leader of the Victorian Labor Party (since 2023)
  - Daniel Andrews, former premier of Victoria (2014–2023) and leader of the Victorian Labor Party (2010–2023)
  - Mike Baird, former premier of New South Wales and leader of the NSW Liberal Party (2014–2017)
  - Colin Barnett, former premier of Western Australia (2008–2017), Western Australia Liberal Leader (2008–2017).
  - Andrew Barr, chief minister of the Australian Capital Territory and leader of the ACT Labor Party (since 2014)
  - Gladys Berejiklian, former premier of New South Wales, leader of the NSW Liberal Party (2017–2021)
  - Kate Carnell, former chief minister of the Australian Capital Territory (1995–2000), former leader of the Canberra Liberals (1993–2000)
  - Bob Carr, former premier of New South Wales (1995–2005), minister for foreign affairs (2012–2013) and leader of the NSW Labor Party (1988–2005)
  - Roger Cook, Premier of Western Australia and leader of WA Labor (since 2023)
  - Natasha Fyles, chief minister of the Northern Territory, leader of the Territory Labor Party (since 2022)
  - Peter Gutwein, former premier of Tasmania and leader of the Tasmanian Liberal Party (2020–2022)
  - Peter Malinauskas, Premier of South Australia (since 2022) and leader of the South Australian Labor Party (since 2018)
  - Mark McGowan, former premier of Western Australia (2017–2023) and leader of WA Labor (2012–2023)
  - Chris Minns, premier of New South Wales (since 2023) and leader of the New South Wales Labor Party (since 2021)
  - Barry O'Farrell, former premier of New South Wales (2011–2014) and leader of the NSW Liberal Party (2007–2014)
  - Annastacia Palaszczuk, Premier of Queensland (since 2015) and leader of the Queensland Labor Party (since 2012)
  - Dominic Perrottet, former Premier of New South Wales and leader of the NSW Liberal Party (2021–2023)
  - Jeremy Rockliff, Premier of Tasmania and leader of the Tasmanian Liberal Party (since 2022).

All state and territory parliamentary members of the Australian Labor Party and the Greens unless otherwise noted.

The following state and territory parliamentary members of the Liberal, National, Liberal National and Country Liberal parties:

- Mia Davies, Nationals member for Central Wheatbelt in the Western Australian Legislative Assembly; former Leader of the Opposition in Western Australia (2021–2023) and Leader of the WA Nationals (2017–2023)
- Matt Kean, Liberal member for Hornsby and former treasurer of New South Wales and deputy leader of the New South Wales Liberal Party
- Jordan Lane, Liberal member for Ryde
- Elizabeth Lee, Leader of the Opposition in the Australian Capital Territory, Leader of the Canberra Liberals and Member for Kurrajong
- Jacqui Munro, Liberal Member of the New South Wales Legislative Council
- Mark Speakman, Leader of the Opposition in New South Wales, Leader of the NSW Liberal Party and Member for Cronulla
- Felicity Wilson, Liberal member for North Shore
- Jess Wilson, Liberal member for Kew in the Victorian Legislative Assembly.
- Sam O'Connor, Liberal National Member for Bonney (since 2017)

=== Political parties ===
==== Federal ====
- Animal Justice Party
- Australian Democrats
- Australian Labor Party
- Australian Greens
- Australian Progressives
- Communist Party of Australia
- David Pocock
- Drew Pavlou Democratic Alliance
- Fusion
- Indigenous-Aboriginal Party
- Kim for Canberra
- Reason
- Socialist Alliance
- TNL
- Victorian Socialists

==== State and territory ====
- Clover Moore Independent Team
- Team Sally Capp
- All state and territory branches of the Greens and the Labor Party.
- Some state and territory branches of the Liberal Party:
  - Tasmania
- Some state and territory branches of the Legalise Cannabis Party:
  - Victoria

=== Local government ===
The mayors of 38 councils across Australia signed the "Mayors for the Voice to Parliament" declaration. Many councils also pledged to support the Voice, including:

- New South Wales
  - Blue Mountains City Council
  - City of Sydney
  - Eurobadalla Shire Council
  - Kyogle Council
  - Lake Macquarie City
  - Georges River Council
  - Kiama Municipal Council
  - Woollahra Council
- South Australia
  - City of Campbelltown
  - City of Mitcham
- Victoria
  - Brimbank City Council
  - City of Kingston
  - City of Melbourne
  - City of Monash
  - City of Moonee Valley
  - Greater Shepparton City Council
  - Hobsons Bay City Council
  - Merri-Bek City Council
  - Nillumbik Shire Council
  - Surf Coast Shire
- Tasmania
  - Hepburn Shire Council
- Queensland
  - Ipswich City Council
- Western Australia
  - City of Bayswater
- Northern Territory
  - Roper Gulf Council

=== Land councils ===
- Anindilyakwa Land Council
- Awabakal Aboriginal Land Council
- Central Land Council
- Kimberley Land Council
- NSW Aboriginal Land Council
- Northern Land Council
- Tiwi Land Council
- Taungurung Land and Waters Council

=== Legal profession ===
- Aboriginal Legal Service ACT/ NSW
- Animal Defenders Office
- Association of Corporate Counsel (ACC) Australia
- Australian Lawyers Alliance
- Australian Pro Bono Centre
- Barwon Community Legal Service
- Community Legal Centres Australia
- Community Legal Centres Queensland
- Economic Justice Australia
- Environmental Defenders Office
- Environmental Justice Australia
- Federation of Community Legal Centres (Victoria)
- Human Rights Law Centre
- Justice Connect
- Law Council of Australia
- Law Society NT
- Law Society of South Australia
- The Law Institute of Victoria
- Legal Aid NSW
- National Justice Project
- The NSW Bar Association
- NSW Young Lawyers
- NSW Law Society
- Public Interest Advocacy Centre
- Queensland Law Society
- Redfern Legal Centre
- Tasmanian Aboriginal Legal Service
- The Victorian Bar
- YFS Legal

Judges

- Stephen Charles, former judge of the Supreme Court of Victoria Court of Appeal
- Robert French, former Chief Justice of Australia
- Michael Kirby, former High Court Justice
- David Harper, former judge of the Supreme Court of Victoria Court of Appeal
- Mary Gaudron, former judge of the High Court of Australia
- Carmel McLure, former president of the Supreme Court of Western Australia Court of Appeal
- Paul Stein, former judge of the Supreme Court of NSW Court of Appeal
- Anthony Whealy, former judge of the Supreme Court of NSW Court of Appeal
- Robert Redlich, former judge of the Supreme Court of Victoria Court of Appeal
- Margaret White, former judge of the Supreme Court of Queensland Court of Appeal
- Michael Barker, former judge of the Federal Court of Australia

Law firms and lawyers

- Hebert Smith Freehills, Allens, Arnold Bloch Leibler, Ashurst, Baker McKenzie, Clayton Utz, Corrs Chambers Westgarth, Dentons, DLA Piper, Fisher Dore, Gilbert + Tobin, Holding Redlich, Jackson McDonald, King & Wood Mallesons, Lander & Rogers, MinterEllison, Norton Rose Fulbright, Russell Kennedy, Ryan Carlisle Thomas Lawyers, Gadens, Marque Lawyers, Fiona McLeod

=== Sporting organisations and athletes ===
==== Bodies ====
- Athletics Australia
- Australian Football League (AFL)
- Australian Olympic Committee (AOC)
- Australian Taekwondo
- Badminton Australia
- Baseball Australia
- Basketball Australia
- Boxing Australia
- Brisbane Organising Committee for the 2032 Olympic and Paralympic Games
- Commonwealth Games Australia (CGA)
- Cricket Australia
- Football Australia
- Golf Australia
- Hockey Australia
- Motorsport Australia
- National Basketball League
- National Rugby League (NRL)
- Netball Australia
- PGA of Australia
- Paralympics Australia
- Rugby Australia
- Sport Inclusion Australia
- Tennis Australia
- Touch Football Australia
- Triathlon Australia

==== Clubs ====
- ACT Brumbies
- Adelaide Football Club
- Brisbane Lions
- Carlton Football Club
- Collingwood Football Club
- Essendon Football Club
- Fremantle Football Club
- Geelong Football Club
- Gold Coast Suns
- Greater Western Sydney Football Club
- Hawthorn Football Club
- Melbourne Football Club
- North Melbourne Football Club
- Port Adelaide Football Club
- Richmond Football Club
- South Sydney Rabbitohs
- St Kilda Football Club
- Sydney Swans
- West Coast Eagles
- Western Bulldogs

==== Prominent athletes ====
- Athletics – Cathy Freeman, Robert de Castella
- Australian football – Michael Long, Michael O'Loughlin, Eddie Betts, Leigh Montagna, Lance Franklin, Adam Goodes, Nathan Buckley, Chloe Molloy, Phil Davis, Patrick Dangerfield, Gavin Wanganeen, Andrew McLeod
- Basketball – Andrew Gaze, Patty Mills
- Boxing – Jamie Pittman
- Cricket – Jason Gillespie, Alyssa Healy
- Hockey – Nova Peris
- Netball – Catherine Cox
- Rugby league – Mal Meninga, Jonathan Thurston, Nathan Cleary
- Rugby union – Phil Waugh, Taniela Tupou and Angus Bell
- Soccer – Jade North
- Tennis – Evonne Goolagong Cawley, Ash Barty

=== Businesses ===
- Atlassian
- ANZ
- Australian Ethical
- Bank Australia
- BHP
- Coles
- Commonwealth Bank
- Compass Group
- Country Road
- Global Creatures
- Goodstart Early Learning
- Intrepid Travel
- Lendlease
- LUSH
- National Australia Bank
- Newcrest (originally neutral)
- NIB
- Qantas
- Rio Tinto
- Simon & Schuster
- Telstra
- Transurban
- Wesfarmers
- Westpac
- Woodside Energy
- Woolworths

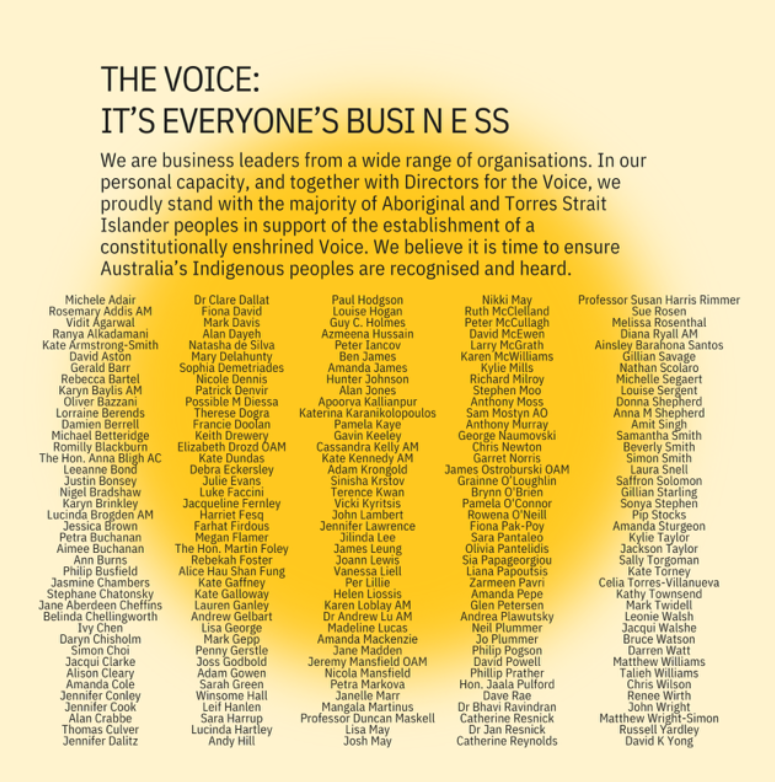

=== Directors for the Voice ===
On 28 August 2023, the campaign called 'Directors for the Voice' was launched, which involved 460 Australian directors from organisations large and small joining together to support the Voice. After the campaign launch, more directors added their names and now more than 2240 company directors have put their name to the campaign to support an Indigenous Voice to parliament.

=== Religious organisations and leaders ===
- Faith-based charities Anglicare Australia, Baptist Care Australia, Catholic Social Services Australia, St Vincent de Paul Society, National Council of Australia Inc, The Salvation Army, UnitingCare Australia
- Uniting Church in Australia (National Assembly)
- Uniting Church in Australia (Synod of Victoria and Tasmania)
- UnitingCare Australia (Uniting NSW.ACT)
- National Council of Churches in Australia followed up an open letter to Federal parliamentarians,
- People from varied religious commitments in the book Uluru Statements from the Soul
- Rev. Michael Jensen (Anglican)
- Anglicare
- Anglican Diocese of Sydney (synod2023)
- Anglican Church Southern Queensland (Diocese of Brisbane)
- Anglican Diocese of Newcastle (Australia)
- The Right Reverend Dr Matt Brain (Anglican: Bishop of Bendigo)
- Dr Murray Harvey (Anglican: Bishop of Grafton)
- Public Affairs Commission and the National Aboriginal and Torres Strait Islander Anglican Council
- Common Grace
- Tearfund
- Fr Frank Brennan (Catholic)
- Archbishop Mark Coleridge (Catholic)
- Brotherhood of St Laurence (Catholic)
- Edmund Rice Centre for Justice & Community Education, and Edmund Rice Community Services (Catholic)
- Society of Saint Vincent de Paul (Catholic)
- Current Congregational Leader, and former Congregational Leader of the Sisters of the Good Samaritan (Catholic)
- Josephite Justice Office (Catholic)
- The National Aboriginal and Torres Strait Islander Catholic Council
- The Office for Justice, Ecology and Peace (an agency of the Australian Catholic Bishops' Conference)
- Mission Australia
- Salvation Army Australia Territory
- Religions for Peace Australia
- National Council of Churches
- Alliance of Australian Muslims
- Islamic Society of South Australia
- Islamic Council of Victoria
- Australian International Islamic College
- Australian Muslim Advocacy Network
- Australian National Imams Council
- Brisbane Muslim Fellowship
- Buddhist Council of NSW
- Buddhist Society of Western Australia
- Australian Sangha Association (Buddhist)
- Executive Council of Australian Jewry
- NSW Jewish Board of Studies
- Australasian Union of Jewish Students
- Stand Up (Jewish)
- Greek Orthodox Community of South Australia
- Shepparton Interfaith Network
- National Sikh Council of Australia
- Hindu Council of Australia
- Queensland Muslims
- Indigenous Ministries Australia and Global Mission Partners
- The Religious Society of Friends (Quakers) in Australia
- Baptist Mission Australia
- National Council of Australian Baptist Ministries (also known as the Baptist Union of Australia)
- Tim Costello
- Micah Australia
- Executive Committee of the Anabaptist Association of Australia and New Zealand
- Michael Frost

=== Community groups, professional bodies, unions, and universities ===
- Academy of Social Sciences in Australia
- Amnesty International Australia
- Animals Australia
- ANTAR
- Alliance for Animals
- Australian Academy of Humanities
- Australian Academy of Science
- Australian Communities Foundation
- Australian Conservation Foundation
- Australian Council for International Development
- Australian Fashion Council
- Australian Institute of Architects
- Australians Investing in Women (AIIW)
- Australian Red Cross
- Australians Together
- Australian Unions
- BEAM Mitchell Environment Group
- Bicycle Network
- BirdLife Australia
- B Lab Australia and Aotearoa New Zealand
- Bularri Muurlay Nyanggan Aboriginal Corporation
- Business Council of Australia
- Caritas Australia
- Centre for Multicultural Youth
- Charles Darwin University
- Charles Sturt University
- Chief Executive Women (CEW)
- Chinese Community Council
- Clean Energy Council
- Commonwealth Games Australia
- Community Gateway
- Conservation Council of South Australia
- Conservation Council of WA
- Council of Single Mothers and their Children
- Council for Intellectual Disability
- Council on the Ageing (COTA)
- Cox Inall Ridgeway
- Curtin Student Guild
- Deakin University
- Diversity Council Australia
- Don Dunstan Foundation
- Early Childhood Australia
- Edith Cowan University
- Engineers Without Borders Australia
- Equality Rights Alliance
- Families Australia
- Federation of Ethnic Communities' Council of Australia
- First People's Disability Network
- Good Things Foundation
- Great Barrier Reef Foundation
- Griffith University
- Gumbaynggirr Giingana Freedom School (GGFS)
- Gunaikurnai Land and Waters Aboriginal Corporation
- Housing for the Aged Action Group (HAAG)
- Humane Society International Australia
- Independent Education Union of Australia NSW/ ACT Branch
- Indigenous Desert Alliance
- Institute for Public Administration Australia (Victorian state branch)
- International Women's Development Agency
- Intersex Human Rights Australia
- Jamukurnu-Yapalikurnu Aboriginal Corporation Directors
- Jesuit Social Services
- Karrkad Kanjdji Trust
- Koorie Women Mean Business
- La Trobe University
- Life Course Centre
- Life Without Barriers
- Market Forces
- Movember
- Municipal Association of Victoria
- Murdoch University
- National Council of Social Services
- National Union of Students
- New South Wales Council for Civil Liberties
- New South Wales National Parks Association
- New South Wales Teachers Federation
- Ngaanyatjarra Pitjantjatjara Yankunytjatjara Women's Council
- Our Watch
- People with Disability Australia (PWDA)
- Queensland Family and Child Commission
- Queensland Human Rights Commission
- Queensland Nurses and Midwives' Union
- Queensland Unions
- Queensland University of Technology
- Save the Children
- Science & Technology Australia
- Seniors First
- Settlement Services International (SSI)
- Social Enterprise Australia (SEA)
- Social Futures
- South Australian Council of Social Service (SACOSS)
- Sustainable Living Armidale
- Tandem
- Tasmanian Council of Social Sciences
- Tenants' Union of NSW
- The Australian Academy of the Humanities
- The Centre for Social Impact
- The Council and the Executive of the University of Melbourne
- The Council of James Cook University
- The Brisbane 2032 Organising Committee
- The Kirby Institute
- The National Native Title Council
- The Property Council of Australia
- The Snow Foundation
- The University of Newcastle
- The University of Queensland, Faculty of Medicine
- The University of Sydney, Faculty of Arts and Social Sciences
- Trust for Nature
- UN Global Compact Network Australia
- UNICEF Australia
- University of Canberra
- University of South Australia
- University of Wollongong
- UN Women Australia
- UN Youth Australia
- Victorian Advocacy League for Individuals with Disability (VALID)
- Victorian Women's Trust
- Walking SA
- Welcoming Australia
- Water Aid Australia
- Western Australian Council of Social Service (WACOSS)
- Wet Tropics Management Authority Board
- The Wilderness Society
- Women's Electoral Lobby
- Women with Disabilities Australia (WWDA)
- World Vision
- WWILD
- YACWA
- Yamatji Marlpa Aboriginal Corporation (YMAC)

==== Climate action organisations ====
In an open letter signed by 43 climate organisations representing more than two million Australians, the climate movement has come out in support of writing 'Yes' for the Referendum, as a long-standing commitment to climate and first nations justice.

- Original Power
- Australian Conservation Foundation
- Oxfam
- GetUp!
- Greenpeace
- Environmental Justice Australia (also listed under legal)
- Conservation Council of WA
- The Climate Reality Project of Australia & Pacific
- Australian Youth Climate Coalition
- Environment Victoria
- Indigenous Peoples' Organisation Australia
- Australian Marine Conservation Society
- Solar Citizens
- Nature Conservation Council
- Queensland Conservation Council
- Australian Parents for Climate Action
- Australian Progress
- Farmers for Climate Action
- Climate and Health Alliance (CAHA)
- The Australia Institute
- Climate Action Newcastle
- The Sunrise Project
- Re-Alliance
- ACCR
- Australia reMade
- Australian Religious Response to Climate Change
- Edmund Rice Centre for Justice & Education
- Gippsland Climate Change Network
- Climate Action Merri-Bek
- Tipping Point
- Kooyong Climate Change Alliance
- Nillumbik Climate Action Team
- Centre for Climate Safety
- Beyond Gas Network
- Otway Climate Emergency Action Network
- CLEANaS
- Lighter Footprints
- Darebin Climate Action Now
- Latrobe Valley Sustainability Group

==== LGBTQIA+ groups ====
22 LGBTQIA+ groups from around Australia:

- Ambassadors & Bridge Builders International (ABBI)
- Bisexual Alliance Victoria
- Blaq Aboriginal Corporation
- Dowson Turco Lawyers
- Just.Equal Australia
- Health Equity Matters
- Equality Australia
- Equality Project
- Equality Tasmania
- Living Proud WA
- Minus 18
- PFLAG Tasmania
- Pride Cup
- Pride Foundation Australia
- Rainbow Crows
- Rainbow Families
- South Australian Rainbow Advocacy Alliance
- Stonewall Medical Centre
- Sydney Gay and Lesbian Mardi Gras
- Thorne Harbour Health
- Transgender Victoria
- Victorian Pride Lobby

=== Health organisations ===
- Australian Medical Association
- Australian Nursing & Midwifery Federation
- Australian Physiotherapy Council
- Breast Cancer Network Australia
- Cancer Council WA
- Cohealth
- First Peoples' Health and Wellbeing
- IPC Health
- National Rural Health Alliance
- North Richmond Community Health
- Médecins Sans Frontières (MSF) Australia
- Occupational Therapy Australia
- Richmond Wellbeing
- Sonder
- Speech Pathology Australia
- The Mental Health Commission of NSW
- Queensland Mental Health Commission
- Victorian Aboriginal Community Controlled Health Organisation (VACCHO)
- Women's Health in the North

One hundred and twenty-five health organisations signed an open letter to support the voice, including:

- Australian Medical Council
- Royal Australian College of General Practitioners
- Royal Australasian College of Surgeons
- Royal Australasian College of Physicians
- Australian College of Nursing
- Australian College of Midwives
- Australasian College for Emergency Medicine
- Royal Australian and New Zealand College of Obstetricians and Gynaecologists
- The Australian College of Optometry
- Royal Australian and New Zealand College of Psychiatrists
- Society of Hospital Pharmacists of Australia
- Rural Doctors Association of Australia
- Australian Association of Psychologists
- Australian Psychological Society Medicines Australia
- Australian Physiotherapy Association
- Australian Academy of Health and Medical Sciences
- Australasian Epidemiological Association
- Australian Association of Medical Research Institutes
- The Australasian Professional Society on Alcohol and Other Drugs
- Foundation for Alcohol Research and Education
- Australian Alcohol and other Drugs Council
- Australian Health Promotion Association
- The National Heart Foundation
- The Fred Hollows Foundation
- Cancer Council Australia
- Beyond Blue
- headspace
- Telethon Kids Institute
- Stroke Foundation Diabetes Australia
- Kidney Health Australia
- Liver Foundation
- Lung Foundation Australia
- Palliative Care Australia
- COTA Australia
- Australian Research Alliance for Children and Youth
- Hearing Care Industry Association
- First Voice Australian Global Health Alliance
- ASHM Health
- SANE Australia
- The Matilda Centre for Research in Mental Health and Substance Use
- Brain and Mind Centre
- Australian Council on Smoking and Health
- Alcohol and Drug Foundation
- Australian Nursing & Midwifery Federation
- Australian Primary Health
- Care Nurses Association
- Consumers Health Forum
- CareFlight
- Public Health Association of Australia
- Health Services Union
- United Workers Union
- Mental Health Australia
- The Australian Cardiovascular Alliance
- Murdoch Children's Research Institute
- Research Australia
- Sydney Children's Hospitals Foundation
- Australian Women's Health Alliance
- Doctors Reform Society
- Alcohol Change Australia
- The Shepherd Centre
- Family Planning Alliance Australia
- Health Equity Matters
- LGBTIQ+ Health Australia
- National Association of People with HIV Australia
- Bobby Goldsmith Foundation
- WAAC
- Health Justice Australia
- Australasian Institute of Digital Health
- Australian Clinical Psychology Association
- National Aboriginal Community Controlled Health Organisation
- Australian Indigenous Doctors' Association
- Congress of Aboriginal and Torres Strait Islander Nurses and Midwives
- National Association of Aboriginal and Torres Strait Islander Health Workers and Health Practitioners
- The Lowitja Instititue
- Gayaa Dhuwi (Proud Spirit) Australia
- Stephanie Alexander Kitchen
- Garden Foundation
- Indigenous Eye Health Unit Sight for All
- The Melbourne School of Population and Global Health
- Hudson Institute of Medical Research
- Burnet Institute
- Doherty Institute
- Nossal Institute for Global Health
- ReachOut Australia
- National Eating Disorder Collaboration
- Suicide Prevention Australia
- Orygen
- Office for Global Health
- BlaQ
- Jean Hailes for Women's Health
- Vision2020
- Services for Australian Rural & Remote Allied Health
- Catholic Health Australia
- Private Healthcare Australia
- Mercy Health
- Mater
- St Vincent's Health Australia
- Cabrini Australia
- Uniting Care Queensland
- Southern Cross Care (NSW & ACT)
- Calvary Health Care
- Medical Technology Association of Australia
- Johnson & Johnson
- Telstra Health
- Merck Healthcare
- MSD Australia & New Zealand
- Bayer Australia
- Sanofi Australia and New Zealand
- Novo Nordisk
- Pharmaceuticals
- Biogen Australia
- Wesfarmers Health
- Amgen
- World Wellness Group
- Thorne Harbour Health
- Smiling Mind
- Medical Journal of Australia
- Glaucoma Australia
- Medical Software Industry Association

=== The arts ===
==== Musicians and bands ====
- Baker Boy
- Jimmy Barnes
- Briggs
- Busby Marou
- John Butler
- Bernard Fanning
- John Farnham
- Peter Garrett
- Dave Graney
- Benn Gunn
- Hilltop Hoods
- Hoodoo Gurus
- Jessica Mauboy
- Midnight Oil
- Missy Higgins
- Xavier Rudd
- Spiderbait
- Dan Sultan
- John Williamson
- John Paul Young

==== Organisations ====
- Arts House
- Australian Dance Theatre
- Australian Girls Choir
- Australian Museums and Galleries Association
- Australian Recording Industry Association (ARIA)
- Bangarra Dance Theatre
- Belvoir
- Blue Room Theatre
- Chamber of Arts and Culture Western Australia
- Darwin Aboriginal Art Fair Foundation
- Ilbijerri Theatre Company
- Justin Arts House Museum
- Lucy Guerin Inc.
- Melbourne Symphony Orchestra
- Moulin Rouge! Australia
- Musica Viva Australia
- National Association for the Visual Arts
- Opera Australia
- Screen Producers Australia Council
- Support Act
- Sydney Symphony Orchestra
- Sydney Theatre Company
- Sydney Writers Festival
- West Australian Symphony Orchestra

=== Other notable individuals ===
On 10 October 25 Australians of the Year signed an open letter supporting the Yes vote, initiated by psychiatrist Patrick McGorry. The 25 signatories were:

- Dylan Alcott
- Rosie Batty
- Taryn Brumfitt
- Rob de Castella
- Mick Dodson
- Peter Doherty
- John Farnham
- Tim Flannery
- Cathy Freeman
- Adam Gilchrist
- Adam Goodes
- Evonne Goolagong
- Shane Gould
- Richard Harris
- Patrick McGorry
- Simon McKeon
- David Morrison
- Gustav Nossal
- Lowitja O'Donoghue
- Keith Potger
- Dick Smith
- Fiona Stanley
- Grace Tame
- Fiona Wood
- John Yu

Other prominent Australians supporting the Yes vote include:

- Courtney Act
- Celeste Barber
- Cate Blanchett
- Brooke Boney
- Tom Cardy
- Kaz Cooke
- Ben Elton
- Peter FitzSimons
- Craig Foster
- Anna Funder
- Helen Garner
- Nikki Gemmell
- Osher Gunsberg
- Anita Heiss
- Chris Hemsworth
- Liam Hemsworth
- Luke Hemsworth
- Joe Hildebrand
- Jess Hill
- Adam Hills
- Dan Ilic
- Chris Kenny
- Kylie Kwong
- Marcia Langton
- Benjamin Law
- Judith Lucy
- Nakkiah Lui
- Ray Martin
- Rove McManus
- Thomas Mayo
- Jackie O
- Kerry O'Brien
- Sam Pang
- Kyle Sandilands
- Mark Coles Smith
- Grace Tame
- Miranda Tapsell
- Jack Thompson
- Anne Twomey
- Sarah Wilson (journalist)
- Tim Winton
- Charlotte Wood

Support has also come from abroad, including:

- Behrouz Boochani, writer resident in New Zealand, former internee in Australia's Manus Island detention centre
- Alastair Campbell, British journalist and author
- Jason Momoa, American actor
- Shaquille O'Neal, American basketballer
- Taika Waititi, New Zealand filmmaker

== No campaign ==
=== Lead lobby groups ===
- Australians for Unity, created on 11 May 2023 and led by Warren Mundine and Jacinta Nampijinpa Price. This is a merger of two key former campaigns:
  - Recognise a Better Way, led by Warren Mundine and including former Nationals deputy PM John Anderson, and former Keating government minister Gary Johns. The campaign, launched in January 2023, was set up by a group called the Voice No Case Committee. They argue that the Voice is "the wrong way to recognise Aboriginal people or help Aboriginal Australians in need", and is "racially discriminatory". The committee included four Indigenous members: Mundine; Jacinta Nampijinpa Price (who left the group in February 2023 to join Advance); founder of the Northern Territory Kings Cross Station Ian Conway; and Bob Liddle, owner of Kemara enterprises. It proposes a different plan.
  - Fair Australia is a No campaign led by Jacinta Nampijinpa Price under the auspices of Advance, which emerged during the 2019 election, attacking activist group GetUp!, supporting Tony Abbott against the independent Zali Steggall (who won the seat), and campaigning against David Pocock.

=== Politicians ===
==== Federal ====
Federal parliamentary members of the Liberal, National, One Nation, Katter's Australian and United Australia parties unless otherwise noted in the Yes case.

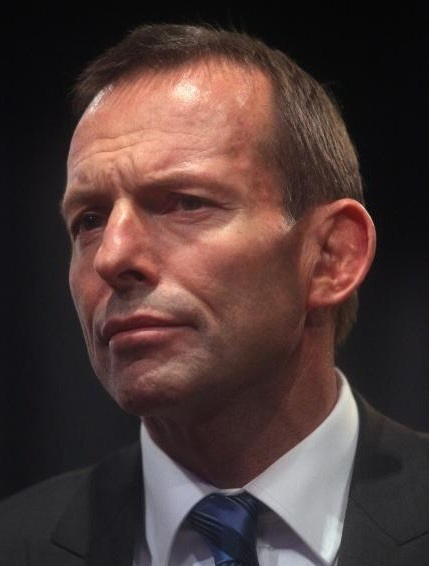
Former prime minister Tony Abbott

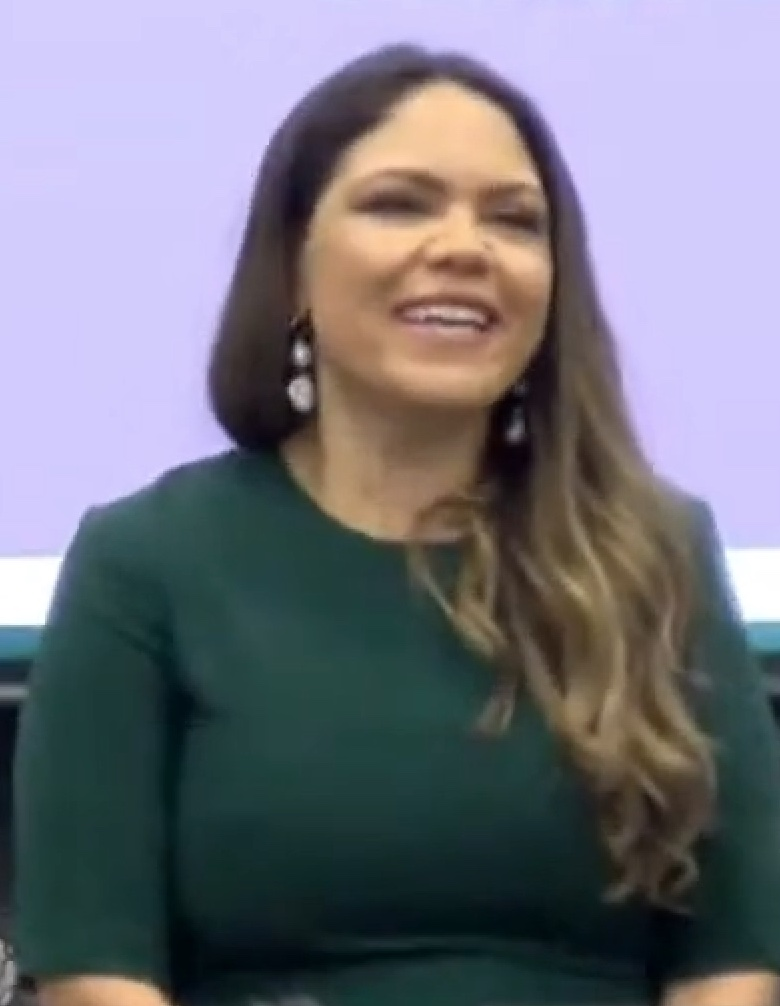
Senator Jacinta Price

The following independents:

- Lidia Thorpe, senator for Victoria (wrote-in Treaty which is considered invalid under Australian Electoral Commission)

The following former prime ministers:

- Scott Morrison, 30th prime minister of Australia (2018–2022) and former Liberal MP for Cook
- Tony Abbott, 28th prime minister of Australia (2013–2015) and former Liberal MP for Warringah
- John Howard, 25th prime minister of Australia (1996–2007) and former Liberal MP for Bennelong

The following former federal ministers:

- John Anderson, former deputy prime minister and leader of the National Party (1999–2005)
- Alexander Downer, former minister for Foreign Affairs (1996–2007); Leader of the Opposition and Leader of the Liberal Party (1994–1995); High Commissioner to the United Kingdom (2014–2018)

The following other former federal politicians:

- Cory Bernardi, former senator for South Australia (2006–2020), founder and leader of the Australian Conservatives (2017–2019)
- Gary Johns, former Labor member for Petrie (1987–1996)
- Warren Mundine, former National President of the Australian Labor Party (2006–2007)
- Clive Palmer, former member for Fairfax; founder and leader of United Australia Party
- Bronwyn Bishop, former liberal member for Mackellar (1994–2016)

==== State and territory ====
- Merome Beard, WA state National MP (since 2022)
- David Crisafulli, Leader of the Opposition in Queensland and Leader of the Liberal National Party of Queensland (LNP) (since 2020)
- Lia Finocchiaro, then Leader of the Opposition in Northern Territory and Leader of the Country Liberal Party (Since 2020).
- Michael Ferguson, deputy Liberal premier of Tasmania (since 2022.
- Jeremy Hanson, Deputy Leader of the Canberra Liberals (since 2022); former leader of the Canberra Liberals (2013–2016)
- Jeff Kennett, former Premier of Victoria (1992–1999) and leader of the Victorian Liberal Party (1982–1989, 1991–1999)
- Bev McArthur, Liberal member of the Victorian Parliament.
- Libby Mettam, Leader of the Liberal Party of Western Australia (since February 2023). Mettam supported the Voice as of April 2023, however by August, she had walked back her support.
- John Pesutto, Opposition Leader of Victoria and Leader of the Liberal Party in Victoria (since 2022)

=== Political parties ===
==== Federal ====
- Australia First Party
- Australian Christians
- Australian Protectionist Party
- Democratic Labour Party
- Family First
- Katter's Australian Party
- Liberal Democratic Party
- Liberal Party of Australia (federally)
- National Party of Australia (federally and in some states)
- Pauline Hanson's One Nation
- United Australia Party
- Western Australia Party
- Australian Communist Party

==== State and territory ====
- Australian Family Party (South Australia)
- Freedom Party of Victoria
- Some state and territory branches of the Liberal Party:
  - South Australia
  - Western Australia
- Some state and territory branches of the National Party:
  - Northern Territory (rank-and-file only) (affiliated federally with both the Liberal and National parties)
  - South Australia
  - Victoria
  - Western Australia

=== Religious organisations and leaders ===
- Australian Christian Lobby
- Australian Jewish Association

=== Notable individuals ===
- David Flint, conservative academic
- Steve Baxter, Australian investor and entrepreneur
- Marcus Blackmore, executive director of Blackmores
- Simeon Boikov, Australian Pro-Russian YouTuber
- Andrew Bolt, columnist and commentator
- Steve Christou, Councillor of Cumberland City Council for the Granville Ward (2017-present) and former mayor of Cumberland (2019-2022)
- Blair Cottrell, far-right activist, former leader of United Patriots Front
- Peta Credlin, Sky News host and former chief of staff to Tony Abbott
- Nigel Farage, Leader of Reform UK (2024–present, 2019–2021), Leader of UK Independence Party (1998–2000, 2006–2009, 2010–2016), Member of the UK Parliament for Clacton (2024–present) and Member of the European Parliament for South East England (1999–2020) (Reform UK)
- Gary Foley, co-founder of the Aboriginal Tent Embassy in 1972
- Fred Hooper, chair of the Murrawarri Peoples Council
- Kamahl (first No, then Yes on 21 September, back to No on 24 September)
- Malcolm McCusker, barrister and former governor of Western Australia
- Anthony Mundine, Aboriginal boxer
- Thomas Sewell, Australian Neo-Nazi and leader of the National Socialist Network
- Keith Windschuttle, conservative academic
- Kevin Donnelly, conservative author and commentator, multiple articles in the Daily Telegraph and Spectator Flat White arguing the No case.

== Neutral ==
- Productivity Commission

=== Political parties ===
- Dai Le and Frank Carbone Network
- Socialist Equality Party – support a boycott of the referendum
- Australia One Party – support a boycott of the referendum
- Sustainable Australia

==== State and territory ====
- Some state and territory branches of the Liberal Party:
  - Canberra Liberals – the ACT division of the party has given its MPs a conscience vote on the issue.
  - Country Liberal Party (Northern Territory; affiliated with both the Liberal and National Parties; parliamentary wing only) – while the organisational wing opposes the Voice, the parliamentary wing is currently neutral.
  - NSW Liberal Party – while former leader and former premier Dominic Perrottet supported the Voice, the current leader, Mark Speakman, endorses a Yes vote but will not actively campaign for a Yes vote and members of the NSW Liberal Party will be given a conscience vote on the issue.
  - Liberal National Party of Queensland (affiliated federally with both the Liberal and National Parties) – while the LNP's leader, David Crisafulli, confirmed he would be voting against the Voice, he ruled out campaigning against it and members of the LNP are given a conscience vote on the issue.
  - Victorian Liberal Party – decided in May 2023 to allow members to have a conscience vote on this issue. John Pesutto, the leader of the party on 4 September, said he was going to vote No but would not be campaigning against it.
- Some state and territory branches of the National Party:
  - New South Wales National Party – initially supported the Voice but moved to allow a conscience vote, in line with the NSW Liberal Party.

=== Politicians ===
==== Local government ====
- Victoria
  - Nathan Conroy (Mayor of Frankston)
- Wellington Shire Council

=== Companies ===
The following companies stated that they stood neutral:

- Aristocrat Leisure
- CSL
- Fortescue
- Goodman Group
- Macquarie Group
- Santos
- Wisetech Global
