= Bird law =

Bird law can refer to:

- Animal law, laws regarding animals in general
- Migratory Bird Treaty Act of 1918, a US law regulating the hunting and capture of birds
- Birds Directive, a European Union directive on the protection of wild birds and their habitats
- An area of law in the American television show It's Always Sunny in Philadelphia

== See also ==
- Audubon (magazine), formerly known as Bird-Lore
- Ornithology, the study of birds
