= Opinion polling for the 2023 Australian Indigenous Voice referendum =

Opinion polling on whether to change the Australian Constitution to establish an Indigenous Voice has been conducted since 2017, when Aboriginal and Torres Strait Islander leaders petitioned for such an amendment as part of the Uluru Statement from the Heart. The number of these polls conducted grew substantially following Labor's victory in the 2022 federal election; the party had committed to holding the referendum required for this constitutional change in its first term of government.

At least ten firms polled Australians on the proposed amendment, greater than the number who have polled party support for any previous Australian election. Some firms were commissioned by media organisations, think tanks, advocacy groups or university foundations. Other firms self-initiated their polls for market research or strategic communications purposes. Considering methodologies, polls were almost exclusively conducted online, with only one firm using SMS. Pollsters differed on whether to give a forced-choice question, as is done in actual Australian referendums, or allow respondents to express indecision or lack of knowledge. Some pollsters also used Likert-style questions to allow respondents to express how strong their opinion is.

The Australian Constitution requires a proposed amendment to attain a double majority in the referendum – not only a majority of votes nationwide, but also a majority in at least four of the six states. Because of this requirement, the level of support in each state was of special interest. One way pollsters investigated state-level support was to break down results from national polls. However, these polls sometimes did not survey enough people from each state to give reliable results about state-level support, especially for smaller states like Tasmania and South Australia. Another way pollsters investigated was by specifically surveying people from a particular state.

Pollsters also often broke down their results by age, gender, and party affiliation. The last was of particular interest because bipartisan support is often considered necessary for an Australian referendum to pass, though it is not a formal requirement.

The extent of support for the Voice among Aboriginal and Torres Strait Islander Australians was a key point of discussion. All publicly available polling indicated absolute majorities among this group favouring the Voice. Important caveats include the small sample size associated with certain polls, the length of time elapsed since the polls were conducted, and the lack of publicly available results and methodologies for certain polls.

== Poll aggregations ==
External poll aggregations
- Nick Evershed and Josh Nicholas for The Guardian
- Kevin Bonham, electoral analyst
- Simon Jackman, University of Sydney professor

Graphical summary – binary choice

== National poll results ==
Polls on establishing an Indigenous Voice
Date(s)	Firm	Sample	With undecideds			Binary (Note: Where possible, binary results come directly from pollsters' forced-choice questions or their own calculations. When such results are not available, a simulated result is produced simply by removing undecided voters from consideration and recalculating percentages. Simulated results are displayed in italics.)		Ref.
Date(s)	Firm	Sample	Yes	No	DK	Yes	No	Ref.
25 September–14 October 2023	Australian Electoral Commission	15,895,231	—	—	—	39.9%	60.1%	
14 October 2023	Voting day for all on-the-day voting in Australia.							
11–14 October 2023	Essential	1125	38%	53%	10%	42%	58%	(Note: Unpublished until post-referendum)
4–12 October 2023	Newspoll	2638	37%	57%	6%	40%	60%	(Note: Simulating a two-answer result from the 37–57–6 figure yields 39–61. The 40–60 figure is from The Australian's report on the poll.)
2–12 October 2023	Roy Morgan	1419	44%	51%	5%	46%	54%	(Note: Also reported without leaners: 40% yes, 46% no, 14% undecided.) (Note: Morgan released early results from this poll on 8 October, showing 41% yes, 45% no and 14% undecided when first prompted and 45% yes, 50% no and 5% undecided when undecideds were prompted again, which ended up as 47% yes to 53% no on a binary basis.)
6–10 October 2023	YouGov	1519	38%	56%	6%	40%	60%	
6–9 October 2023	JWS Research	922	39%	52%	9%	43%	57%	(Note: Also reported without leaners: 36% yes, 48% no, 16% undecided.)
1–9 October 2023	DemosAU	2251	34%	54%	12%	39%	61%	
October 2023	Pollinate	—N/a	35%	47%	18%	43%	57%	
3–6 October 2023	Newspoll	1225	34%	58%	8%	37%	63%	
22 September–4 October 2023	Resolve Strategic	4728	38%	49%	13%	44%	56%	
2–3 October 2023	Early in-person voting begins for electors who cannot vote on the day.							
18 September–2 October 2023	Focaldata	4608	—N/a	—N/a	—N/a	39%	61%	
27 September–1 October 2023	Essential	1125	43%	49%	8%	47%	53%	
25 September–1 October 2023	Roy Morgan	909	37%	46%	17%	44%	56%	
25–29 September 2023	YouGov	1563	38%	53%	9%	42%	58%	
25 September 2023	Voting begins in certain remote areas.							
22–24 September 2023	Freshwater Strategy	1003	33%	50%	17%	40%	60%	
18–24 September 2023	Roy Morgan	1511	39%	44%	17%	47%	53%	
18–22 September 2023	Newspoll	1239	36%	56%	8%	39%	61%	
15–22 September 2023	GIC	1283	38%	45%	17%	46%	54%	
13–21 September 2023	RedBridge	1500	—N/a	—N/a	—N/a	38%	62%	
September 2023	Pollinate	—N/a	35%	44%	21%	44%	56%	
1–19 September 2023	DemosAU	2504	38%	54%	8%	41%	59%	
13–16 September 2023	Essential	1135	41%	51%	9%	45%	55%	
6–9 September 2023	Resolve Strategic	1604	35%	49%	16%	43%	57%	
2–5 September 2023	Freshwater Strategy	1761	35%	50%	15%	41%	59%	
30 August–4 September 2023	RedBridge	1001	—N/a	—N/a	—N/a	39%	61%	
30 August–3 September 2023	Essential	1151	42%	48%	10%	47%	53%	
28 August–1 September 2023	Newspoll	1200	38%	53%	9%	42%	58%	
7–31 August 2023	DemosAU	2359	39%	42%	19%	48%	52%	
30 August 2023	PM Anthony Albanese announces 14 October as referendum date.							
16–21 August 2023	SEC Newgate	1200	—N/a	—N/a	—N/a	46%	54%	
August 2023	Pollinate	1000	31%	39%	30%	44%	56%	
9–13 August 2023	Resolve Strategic	1603	37%	45%	18%	46%	54%	
2–5 August 2023	Essential	1150	43%	47%	10%	48%	52%	
July 2023	Scanlon Institute	7454	49%	30%	20%	62%	38%	
11–28 July 2023	DemosAU	2359	39%	42%	20%	48%	52%	
21–27 July 2023	RedBridge	1022	—N/a	—N/a	—N/a	44%	56%	
12–15 July 2023	Resolve Strategic	1610	36%	42%	22%	48%	52%	
12–15 July 2023	Newspoll	1570	41%	48%	11%	46%	54%	
July 2023 (Note: Private poll, reported to have been conducted over two weeks in July.)	Australian Labor Party	14300	48%	47%	5%	51%	49%	
5–9 July 2023	Essential	1125	47%	43%	10%	52%	48%	
4–7 July 2023	Australia Institute	1004	52%	33%	15%	61%	39%	
June 2023	DemosAU	—N/a	44%	39%	18%	53%	47%	
23–28 June 2023	SEC Newgate	2207	43%	34%	23%	56%	44%	
21–25 June 2023 (Note: During 21―25 June, Essential used A/B testing to trial a change to its methodology: some respondents were given a binary question, others were also permitted an "unsure" option.)	Essential	574	46%	42%	12%	52%	48%	
21–25 June 2023	Essential	574	—N/a	—N/a	—N/a	56%	44%	
16–24 June 2023	Newspoll	2303	43%	47%	10%	48%	52%	
19 June 2023	The Constitutional Amendment bill passes through the Senate.							
7–11 June 2023	Essential	1123	—N/a	—N/a	—N/a	60%	40%	
5–11 June 2023 (Note: Precise dates within this week were not reported.)	Resolve Strategic	1606	42%	40%	18%	49%	51%	
2–6 June 2023	JWS Research	1122	46%	43%	11%	51%	49%	
31 May–3 June 2023	Newspoll	1549	46%	43%	11%	52%	48%	
May 2023	DemosAU	—N/a	43%	35%	22%	55%	45%	
26–29 May 2023	Roy Morgan	1833	46%	36%	18%	56%	44%	(Note: Poll was conducted via SMS.)
26 May 2023 (Note: Poll conducted in May but precise dates were unreported.)	Finder	1050	48%	39%	13%	55%	45%	
15–17 May 2023	Freshwater Strategy	1005	48%	38%	14%	55%	45%	
10–14 May 2023	Essential	1080	—N/a	—N/a	—N/a	59%	41%	
10–13 May 2023	Resolve Strategic	1610	44%	39%	18%	53%	47%	
4–8 May 2023	Ipsos	946	—N/a	—N/a	—N/a	60%	40%	(Note: Poll only surveyed non-Indigenous Australians.)
April 2023	DemosAU	—N/a	58%	29%	13%	66%	34%	
14–18 April 2023	Roy Morgan	1181	46%	39%	15%	54%	46%	
13–18 April 2023	SEC Newgate	1200	52%	27%	21%	66%	34%	
12–16 April 2023	Essential	1136	—N/a	—N/a	—N/a	60%	40%	
12–16 April 2023	Resolve Strategic	1609	46%	31%	22%	58%	42%	
9–12 April 2023	Freshwater Strategy	1002	42%	34%	24%	56%	44%	
5 April 2023	The federal Liberal Party announces its opposition.							
29 March–1 April 2023	Newspoll	1500	53%	39%	8%	58%	42%	
1–21 March 2023	YouGov	15060	51%	34%	15%	60%	40%	
15–19 March 2023	Essential	1124	—N/a	—N/a	—N/a	59%	41%	
12–16 March 2023	Resolve Strategic	1600	46%	32%	22%	57%	43%	
1–4 March 2023	Newspoll	1530	53%	38%	9%	58%	42%	
24–27 February 2023	JWS Research	940	51%	36%	13%	59%	41%	(Note: Also reported without leaners: 42% yes, 28% no, 30% need more information/can't say.)
15–19 February 2023	Resolve Strategic	1604	46%	32%	21%	58%	42%	
1–6 February 2023	SEC Newgate	1478	53%	22%	25%	71%	29%	
1–5 February 2023	Essential	1000	—N/a	—N/a	—N/a	65%	35%	
1–4 February 2023	Newspoll	1512	56%	37%	7%	60%	40%	
December 2022–January 2023 (Note: Reported as single poll, but conducted in two stages (December (1611 respondents) and 17–22 January (1606 respondents)) to obtain a larger sample size.)	Resolve Strategic	3217	47%	30%	23%	60%	40%	
16–18 December 2022	Freshwater Strategy	1209	50%	26%	23%	65%	35%	
9–12 December 2022	Roy Morgan	1499	53%	30%	17%	64%	36%	
7–11 December 2022	Essential	1075	—N/a	—N/a	—N/a	63%	37%	
28 November–2 December 2022	Institute for Public Affairs	1000	38%	34%	28%	53%	47%	(Note: Poll did not characterise Voice as constitutional change.) (Note: Murray Goot has criticised the IPA poll for "tendentious" and "misleading" wording, suggesting it was skewed to encourage respondents to express opposition to the Voice. Because he still included the poll in his compilation, it has been included here for completeness.)
28 November 2022	The federal National Party announces its opposition.							
5–10 October 2022	SEC Newgate	1207	55%	19%	25%	74%	26%	
7 October 2022	Compass Polling	1001	—N/a	—N/a	—N/a	60%	40%	
August–September 2022 (Note: Reported as single poll, but conducted in two stages (17–21 August (2011 respondents) and 13–18 September (1607 respondents)) to obtain a larger sample size.)	Resolve Strategic	3618	53%	29%	19%	64%	36%	
3 September 2022	Compass Polling	1006	—N/a	—N/a	—N/a	65%	35%	
12–15 August 2022	JWS Research	1000	43%	24%	34%	65%	35%	(Note: The 34% figure combines 14% undecided and 20% needing more information.)
11–15 August 2022	SEC Newgate	1804	57%	19%	24%	75%	25%	
3–7 August 2022	Essential	1075	—N/a	—N/a	—N/a	65%	35%	
30 July 2022	Albanese reveals draft amendment wording.							
11–24 July 2022	Scanlon Institute	5757	59%	18%	20%	77%	23%	
13–15 July 2022	Australia Institute	1001	65%	14%	21%	82%	18%	
14–17 June 2022	Australia Institute	1001	58%	16%	26%	78%	22%	
25–30 May 2022	Essential	1089	53%	17%	29%	76%	24%	
23–27 May 2022	SEC Newgate	1403	59%	16%	25%	79%	21%	
21 May 2022	Labor wins the 2022 federal election, pledging a first-term referendum.							
August 2021	CT Group	—N/a	57%	16%	28%	78%	22%	
6 July 2021	Essential	1099	66%	19%	15%	78%	22%	
9–18 February 2021	Omnipoll	1456	53%	18%	29%	75%	25%	(Note: Also reported figures after respondents were given further information on the Voice: 51% yes, 21% no, 28% unsure.)
June 2020	CT Group	2000	56%	17%	27%	77%	23%	
February 2020	CT Group	2000	49%	20%	31%	71%	29%	
19–23 June 2019	Essential	1079	66%	21%	13%	76%	24%	
2–6 May 2019	Essential	1079	43%	—N/a	—N/a	—N/a	—N/a	
22–25 February 2018	Essential	1028	68%	21%	11%	76%	24%	
15–18 February 2018	Newspoll	1632	57%	32%	11%	64%	36%	
5–7 December 2017	Australia Institute	1417	46%	29%	24%	61%	39%	
3–6 November 2017	Essential	1025	45%	16%	39%	74%	26%	(Note: Includes 28 per cent of neutral responses on top of 11 per cent of undecided responses.)
3–10 August 2017	Omnipoll	1526	61%	30%	9%	67%	33%	
1–5 June 2017	Essential	1013	44%	14%	42%	76%	24%	(Note: Includes 27 per cent of neutral responses on top of 14 per cent of undecided responses.)
26 May 2017	In the Uluru Statement, Indigenous leaders call for a constitutional Voice.							
November 2016–May 2017	Cox Inall Ridgeway	5000	—N/a	—N/a	—N/a	68%	32%	

== Subpopulation results ==
=== Results by state ===
Polls on establishing an Indigenous Voice
Date(s)	Firm	Sample	New South Wales			Victoria			Queensland			Western Australia			South Australia			Tasmania			Ref.
Date(s)	Firm	Sample	Y	N	DK	Y	N	DK	Y	N	DK	Y	N	DK	Y	N	DK	Y	N	DK	Ref.
25 September–14 October 2023	Australian Electoral Commission	15,895,231	41.0%	59.0%	—	45.9%	54.1%	—	31.8%	68.2%	—	36.7%	63.3%	—	35.8%	64.1%	—	41.1%	58.9%	—	
14 October 2023	Voting day for all in-person voting across Australia.																				
3–12 October 2023	Newspoll	3863	41%	54%	5%	43%	51%	6%	30%	65%	5%	28%	65%	7%	33%	60%	7%	38%	55%	7%	
2–12 October 2023	Roy Morgan	1419	46%	49%	5%	54%	42%	4%	30%	64%	6%	44%	54%	2%	39%	51%	10%	47%	52%	1%	
6–9 October 2023	JWS Research	922	40%	52%	8%	44%	44%	11%	33%	56%	11%	28%	64%	7%	40%	56%	4%	—N/a	—N/a	—N/a	
1–9 October 2023	DemosAU	2251	—N/a	—N/a	—N/a	—N/a	—N/a	—N/a	30%	57%	12%	30%	57%	13%	—N/a	—N/a	—N/a	—N/a	—N/a	—N/a	
22 September–4 October 2023	Resolve Strategic	4728	48%	52%	—N/a	46%	54%	—N/a	36%	64%	—N/a	39%	61%	—N/a	44%	56%	—N/a	56%	44%	—N/a	
27 September–1 October 2023	Essential	1125	42%	50%	8%	43%	45%	12%	39%	56%	4%	—N/a	—N/a	—N/a	—N/a	—N/a	—N/a	—N/a	—N/a	—N/a	
18–24 September 2023	Roy Morgan	1511	40%	42%	18%	46%	42%	12%	31%	49%	20%	30%	46%	24%	36%	48%	16%	56%	43%	1%	
13–21 September 2023	RedBridge	1500	42%	58%	—N/a	41%	59%	—N/a	32%	68%	—N/a	—N/a	—N/a	—N/a	—N/a	—N/a	—N/a	—N/a	—N/a	—N/a	
13–16 September 2023	Essential	1135	47%	44%	8%	45%	47%	8%	30%	60%	10%	—N/a	—N/a	—N/a	—N/a	—N/a	—N/a	—N/a	—N/a	—N/a	
September 2023	Fair Australia	637	—N/a	—N/a	—N/a	—N/a	—N/a	—N/a	—N/a	—N/a	—N/a	36%	59%	5%	—N/a	—N/a	—N/a	—N/a	—N/a	—N/a	
8–9 September 2023	Painted Dog	1285	—N/a	—N/a	—N/a	—N/a	—N/a	—N/a	—N/a	—N/a	—N/a	39%	61%	—N/a	—N/a	—N/a	—N/a	—N/a	—N/a	—N/a	
6–9 September 2023	Resolve Strategic	1604	44%	56%	—N/a	49%	51%	—N/a	39%	61%	—N/a	39%	61%	—N/a	41%	59%	—N/a	56%	44%	—N/a	
30 August–4 September 2023	RedBridge	1001	39%	61%	—N/a	45%	55%	—N/a	35%	65%	—N/a	—N/a	—N/a	—N/a	—N/a	—N/a	—N/a	—N/a	—N/a	—N/a	
30 August–3 September 2023	Essential	1151	45%	44%	10%	43%	44%	12%	35%	58%	8%	34%	58%	8%	37%	45%	17%	—N/a	—N/a	—N/a	
21 August 2023	Insightfully	1156	—N/a	—N/a	—N/a	—N/a	—N/a	—N/a	—N/a	—N/a	—N/a	—N/a	—N/a	—N/a	—N/a	—N/a	—N/a	42%	53%	5%	
16–21 August 2023	SEC Newgate	1200	48%	52%	—N/a	51%	49%	—N/a	37%	63%	—N/a	37%	63%	—N/a	46%	54%	—N/a	—N/a	—N/a	—N/a	
July–August 2023	Resolve Strategic	3213	46%	54%	—N/a	51%	49%	—N/a	41%	59%	—N/a	44%	56%	—N/a	46%	54%	—N/a	55%	45%	—N/a	
1–7 August 2023	Australia Institute	605	—N/a	—N/a	—N/a	—N/a	—N/a	—N/a	—N/a	—N/a	—N/a	—N/a	—N/a	—N/a	43%	39%	18%	—N/a	—N/a	—N/a	
2–5 August 2023	Essential	1150	41%	47%	12%	47%	46%	7%	40%	51%	9%	39%	48%	13%	45%	48%	7%	—N/a	—N/a	—N/a	
21–27 July 2023	RedBridge	1022	44%	56%	—N/a	45%	55%	—N/a	37%	63%	—N/a	—N/a	—N/a	—N/a	—N/a	—N/a	—N/a	—N/a	—N/a	—N/a	
18–20 July 2023	Utting Research	1000	—N/a	—N/a	—N/a	—N/a	—N/a	—N/a	—N/a	—N/a	—N/a	29%	58%	13%	—N/a	—N/a	—N/a	—N/a	—N/a	—N/a	
June–July 2023	Resolve Strategic	3216	49%	51%	—N/a	52%	48%	—N/a	42%	58%	—N/a	49%	51%	—N/a	49%	51%	—N/a	54%	46%	—N/a	
5–9 July 2023	Essential	1125	45%	44%	11%	48%	39%	13%	42%	50%	8%	49%	47%	4%	49%	38%	13%	—N/a	—N/a	—N/a	
29 June–2 July 2023	Freshwater Strategy	1065	—N/a	—N/a	—N/a	—N/a	—N/a	—N/a	36%	50%	14%	—N/a	—N/a	—N/a	—N/a	—N/a	—N/a	—N/a	—N/a	—N/a	
31 May–24 June 2023	Newspoll	3852	46%	41%	13%	48%	41%	11%	40%	54%	6%	39%	52%	9%	45%	46%	9%	43%	48%	9%	
17–19 June 2023	Institute of Public Affairs	660	—N/a	—N/a	—N/a	—N/a	—N/a	—N/a	—N/a	—N/a	—N/a	—N/a	—N/a	—N/a	39%	42%	19%	—N/a	—N/a	—N/a	
17 June 2023 (Note: Precise dates conducted were unreported.)	Painted Dog	1050	—N/a	—N/a	—N/a	—N/a	—N/a	—N/a	—N/a	—N/a	—N/a	57%	43%	—N/a	—N/a	—N/a	—N/a	—N/a	—N/a	—N/a	
7–11 June 2023	Essential	1123	62%	38%	—N/a	62%	38%	—N/a	57%	43%	—N/a	52%	48%	—N/a	53%	47%	—N/a	—N/a	—N/a	—N/a	
2–6 June 2023	JWS Research	1122	41%	47%	12%	44%	42%	14%	45%	46%	9%	61%	33%	6%	43%	42%	15%	—N/a	—N/a	—N/a	
May–June 2023	Resolve Strategic	3217	53%	47%	—N/a	56%	44%	—N/a	44%	56%	—N/a	49%	51%	—N/a	48%	52%	—N/a	57%	43%	—N/a	
26–29 May 2023	Roy Morgan	1833	48%	38%	14%	47%	32%	21%	39%	46%	15%	41%	35%	24%	47%	32%	21%	42%	26%	32%	
26 May 2023	Finder	982	48%	38%	13%	51%	35%	14%	43%	44%	13%	49%	42%	10%	43%	44%	13%	—N/a	—N/a	—N/a	
10–14 May 2023	Essential	1080	64%	36%	—N/a	61%	39%	—N/a	49%	51%	—N/a	52%	48%	—N/a	61%	39%	—N/a	—N/a	—N/a	—N/a	
14–18 April 2023	Roy Morgan	1181	46%	38%	16%	52%	31%	17%	41%	46%	13%	46%	41%	13%	39%	50%	11%	38%	33%	29%	
13–18 April 2023	SEC Newgate	1200	54%	26%	20%	60%	20%	20%	41%	34%	25%	43%	30%	27%	—N/a	—N/a	—N/a	—N/a	—N/a	—N/a	
12–16 April 2023	Essential	1136	59%	41%	—N/a	56%	44%	—N/a	55%	45%	—N/a	70%	30%	—N/a	64%	36%	—N/a	—N/a	—N/a	—N/a	
5 April 2023	The federal Liberal Party announces its opposition.																				
February–April 2023	Newspoll	4756	55%	36%	9%	56%	35%	9%	49%	43%	8%	51%	41%	8%	60%	33%	7%	55%	39%	6%	
25–26 March 2023	Painted Dog	1052	—N/a	—N/a	—N/a	—N/a	—N/a	—N/a	—N/a	—N/a	—N/a	54%	35%	11%	—N/a	—N/a	—N/a	—N/a	—N/a	—N/a	(Note: Poll also provided forced-choice results: 60 Y, 40 N.)
1–21 March 2023	YouGov	15060	52%	32%	16%	53%	31%	16%	47%	40%	14%	48%	37%	15%	51%	34%	16%	50%	35%	15%	
15–19 March 2023	Essential	1124	61%	39%	—N/a	67%	33%	—N/a	49%	51%	—N/a	55%	45%	—N/a	62%	38%	—N/a	—N/a	—N/a	—N/a	
February–March 2023	Resolve Strategic	1600	—N/a	—N/a	—N/a	—N/a	—N/a	—N/a	52%	48%	—N/a	52%	48%	—N/a	—N/a	—N/a	—N/a	—N/a	—N/a	—N/a	
24–27 February 2023	JWS Research	940	52%	32%	16%	54%	35%	11%	48%	38%	13%	50%	42%	9%	46%	38%	15%	—N/a	—N/a	—N/a	
1–5 February 2023	Essential	1000	63%	37%	—N/a	64%	36%	—N/a	65%	35%	—N/a	68%	32%	—N/a	62%	38%	—N/a	—N/a	—N/a	—N/a	
December 2022–January 2023	Resolve Strategic	3217	58%	42%	—N/a	65%	35%	—N/a	56%	44%	—N/a	61%	39%	—N/a	56%	44%	—N/a	71%	29%	—N/a	
14–17 January 2023	YouGov	1069	46%	30%	24%	—N/a	—N/a	—N/a	—N/a	—N/a	—N/a	—N/a	—N/a	—N/a	—N/a	—N/a	—N/a	—N/a	—N/a	—N/a	
2–6 January 2023	Painted Dog	1124	—N/a	—N/a	—N/a	—N/a	—N/a	—N/a	—N/a	—N/a	—N/a	51%	27%	22%	—N/a	—N/a	—N/a	—N/a	—N/a	—N/a	
9–12 December 2022	Roy Morgan	1499	52%	29%	19%	55%	28%	17%	44%	38%	18%	63%	26%	11%	54%	33%	13%	68%	24%	8%	
7–11 December 2022	Essential	1075	66%	34%	—N/a	66%	34%	—N/a	56%	44%	—N/a	56%	44%	—N/a	60%	40%	—N/a	—N/a	—N/a	—N/a	
28 November 2022	The federal National Party announces its opposition.																				
5–10 October 2022	SEC Newgate	1207	56%	—N/a	—N/a	60%	—N/a	—N/a	53%	—N/a	—N/a	49%	—N/a	—N/a	53%	—N/a	—N/a	—N/a	—N/a	—N/a	
August–September 2022	Resolve Strategic	3618	65%	35%	—N/a	64%	36%	—N/a	59%	41%	—N/a	60%	40%	—N/a	71%	29%	—N/a	73%	27%	—N/a	
12–15 August 2022	JWS Research	1000	43%	24%	34%	44%	17%	39%	38%	31%	31%	40%	25%	36%	40%	27%	33%	—N/a	—N/a	—N/a	
3–7 August 2022	Essential	1075	65%	35%	—N/a	63%	37%	—N/a	62%	38%	—N/a	75%	25%	—N/a	60%	40%	—N/a	—N/a	—N/a	—N/a	
30 July 2022	PM Anthony Albanese reveals draft amendment wording.																				
11–24 July 2022	Scanlon Institute	5757	62%	—N/a	—N/a	62%	—N/a	—N/a	51%	—N/a	—N/a	59%	—N/a	—N/a	57%	—N/a	—N/a	—N/a	—N/a	—N/a	
13–15 July 2022	Australia Institute	1001	62%	12%	25%	71%	12%	17%	66%	11%	23%	63%	22%	15%	—N/a	—N/a	—N/a	—N/a	—N/a	—N/a	
14–17 June 2022	Australia Institute	1001	59%	15%	26%	57%	13%	30%	57%	21%	22%	57%	22%	21%	—N/a	—N/a	—N/a	—N/a	—N/a	—N/a	
21 May 2022	Labor wins the 2022 federal election, pledging a first-term referendum.																				
9–18 February 2021	Omnipoll	1456	63%	10%	27%	67%	11%	22%	57%	16%	27%	59%	14%	28%	57%	11%	32%	74%	11%	15%	(Note: 2021 state figures give combined support for legislated and constitutional Voice.)
5–7 December 2017	Australia Institute	1417	50%	28%	22%	51%	24%	25%	41%	33%	26%	36%	38%	26%	45%	26%	30%	—N/a	—N/a	—N/a	
3–10 August 2017	Omnipoll	1526	62%	29%	9%	63%	28%	9%	60%	33%	7%	57%	33%	11%	56%	31%	13%	44%	49%	7%	
26 May 2017	In the Uluru Statement, Indigenous leaders call for a constitutional Voice.																				

=== Results by party affiliation ===
Date(s)	Firm	Sample	Labor			Coalition			Greens			One Nation			Other			Ref.
Date(s)	Firm	Sample	Y	N	DK	Y	N	DK	Y	N	DK	Y	N	DK	Y	N	DK	Ref.
14 October 2023	Voting day for all in-person voting across Australia.																	
2–12 October 2023	Roy Morgan	1419	72%	18%	10%	10%	81%	9%	83%	10%	7%	—	—N/a	—N/a	30%	61%	9%	(Note: Roy Morgan also published results for voters supporting independents (Y 38%, N 42% DK 20%).)
6–10 October 2023	YouGov	1519	53%	40%	8%	20%	75%	3%	70%	25%	5%	—	—N/a	—N/a	—	—N/a	—N/a	
3–6 October 2023	Newspoll	1225	56%	36%	8%	—	—N/a	—N/a	—	—N/a	—N/a	—	—N/a	—N/a	—	—N/a	—N/a	
22 September–4 October 2023	Resolve Strategic	4728	67%	33%	—N/a	16%	84%	—N/a	80%	20%	—N/a	—	—N/a	—N/a	—	—N/a	—N/a	
18 September–2 October 2023	Focaldata	4608	55%	45%	—N/a	18%	82%	—N/a	73%	27%	—N/a	12%	88%	—N/a	24%	76%	—N/a	(Note: Focaldata also published results for voters supporting the United Australia Party (Y 35%, N 65%) and independents (Y 30%, N 70%).)
25–29 September 2023	YouGov	1563	49%	41%	10%	22%	73%	5%	70%	24%	6%	—	—N/a	—N/a	—	—N/a	—N/a	
22–24 September 2023	Freshwater Strategy	1003	51%	31%	18%	20%	71%	9%	—	—N/a	—N/a	—	—N/a	—N/a	—	—N/a	—N/a	
18–24 September 2023	Roy Morgan	1833	67%	18%	15%	12%	76%	12%	83%	5%	12%	2%	94%	4%	22%	62%	16%	(Note: Roy Morgan also published results for voters supporting independents (Y 42%, N 42%, DK 16%).)
18–22 September 2023	Newspoll	1239	56%	36%	8%	—	—N/a	—N/a	—	—N/a	—N/a	—	—N/a	—N/a	—	—N/a	—N/a	
13–21 September 2023	RedBridge	1500	51%	49%	—N/a	19%	81%	—N/a	75%	25%	—N/a	—	—N/a	—N/a	28%	72%	—N/a	
13–16 September 2023	Essential	1135	58%	33%	8%	26%	70%	4%	70%	20%	10%	—	—N/a	—N/a	24%	71%	5%	
6–9 September 2023	Resolve Strategic	1604	60%	40%	—N/a	16%	84%	—N/a	78%	22%	—N/a	—	—N/a	—N/a	—	—N/a	—N/a	
30 August–4 September 2023	RedBridge	1001	57%	43%	—N/a	13%	87%	—N/a	77%	23%	—N/a	—	—N/a	—N/a	20%	80%	—N/a	
5 September 2023	Essential	1043	61%	39%	—N/a	26%	74%	—N/a	71%	29%	—N/a	—	—N/a	—N/a	18%	82%	—N/a	
28 August–1 September 2023	Newspoll	1200	61%	31%	8%	—	—N/a	—N/a	64%	26%	10%	—	—N/a	—N/a	—	—N/a	—N/a	
2–5 August 2023	Essential	1043	58%	8%	34%	25%	68%	7%	70%	19%	11%	—	—N/a	—N/a	30%	64%	6%	
12–15 July 2023	Resolve Strategic	1610	50%	28%	23%	17%	64%	19%	69%	12%	19%	—	—N/a	—N/a	20%	58%	22%	
5–9 July 2023	Essential	1022	64%	26%	10%	33%	60%	7%	73%	18%	9%	—	—N/a	—N/a	25%	68%	25%	
4–7 July 2023	Australia Institute	1004	65%	21%	14%	37%	49%	14%	74%	8%	18%	14%	78%	8%	36%	40%	24%	
19 June 2023	The Constitutional Amendment bill passes through the Senate.																	
7–11 June 2023	Essential	1123	72%	28%	—N/a	43%	57%	—N/a	83%	17%	—N/a	—	—N/a	—N/a	38%	62%	—N/a	
5–11 June 2023	Resolve Strategic	1606	56%	28%	16%	20%	63%	17%	76%	13%	11%	—	—N/a	—N/a	23%	57%	20%	(Note: Resolve Strategic also published results for uncommitted voters (Y 37%, N 38%, DK 25%).)
31 May–3 June 2023	Newspoll	1549	63%	—N/a	—N/a	—	64%	—N/a	71%	—N/a	—N/a	—	—N/a	—N/a	—	64%	—N/a	
26–29 May 2023	Roy Morgan	1833	67%	12%	21%	10%	73%	17%	90%	3%	7%	2%	86%	12%	30%	50%	20%	(Note: Roy Morgan also published results for voters supporting independents (Y 49%, N 26%, DK 25%).)
10–14 May 2023	Essential	1136	71%	29%	—N/a	45%	55%	—N/a	81%	19%	—N/a	—	—N/a	—N/a	41%	59%	—N/a	
10–13 May 2023	Resolve Strategic	1610	69%	31%	—N/a	27%	73%	—N/a	83%	17%	—N/a	—	—N/a	—N/a	—	—N/a	—N/a	
14–18 April 2023	Roy Morgan	1181	75%	14%	11%	6%	74%	20%	89%	5%	6%	7%	89%	4%	21%	50%	29%	(Note: Roy Morgan also published results for voters supporting independents (Y 40%, N 32%, DK 28%).)
13–18 April 2023	SEC Newgate	1200	—N/a	—N/a	—N/a	26%	50%	24%	—	—N/a	—N/a	—	—N/a	—N/a	—	—N/a	—N/a	
12–16 April 2023	Essential	1136	76%	24%	—N/a	41%	59%	—N/a	81%	18%	—N/a	—	—N/a	—N/a	45%	54%	—N/a	
5 April 2023	The federal Liberal Party announces its opposition.																	
29 March–1 April 2023	Newspoll	1500	72%	—N/a	—N/a	—	55%	—N/a	—	—N/a	—N/a	—	—N/a	—N/a	—	—N/a	—N/a	
15–19 March 2023	Essential	1124	78%	22%	—N/a	43%	57%	—N/a	77%	23%	—N/a	—	—N/a	—N/a	41%	59%	—N/a	
12–16 March 2023	Resolve Strategic	1600	72%	28%	—N/a	33%	67%	—N/a	86%	14%	—N/a	—	—N/a	—N/a	44%	56%	—N/a	
1–4 March 2023	Newspoll	1530	68%	21%	11%	35%	—N/a	—N/a	—	—N/a	—N/a	—	—N/a	—N/a	—	—N/a	—N/a	
1–6 February 2023	SEC Newgate	1478	65%	—N/a	—N/a	32%	43%	25%	77%	—N/a	—N/a	—	—N/a	—N/a	—	—N/a	—N/a	
1–5 February 2023	Essential	1000	77%	23%	—N/a	41%	59%	—N/a	89%	11%	—N/a	—	—N/a	—N/a	52%	48%	—N/a	
1–4 February 2023	Newspoll	1512	74%	18%	8%	37%	59%	4%	81%	10%	9%	—	—N/a	—N/a	41%	53%	6%	
December 2022–January 2023	Resolve Strategic	3217	61%	—N/a	—N/a	27%	—N/a	—N/a	72%	—N/a	—N/a	—	—N/a	—N/a	45%	—N/a	—N/a	(Note: Reported as single poll, but conducted in two stages (December (1611 respondents) and 17–22 January (1606 respondents)) to obtain a larger sample size.)
9–12 December 2022	Roy Morgan	1499	76%	9%	15%	15%	64%	21%	89%	2%	9%	18%	71%	11%	59%	25%	16%	(Note: Roy Morgan also published results for voters supporting independents (Y 54%, N 21%, DK 25%).)
7–11 December 2022	Essential	1075	75%	25%	—N/a	46%	54%	—N/a	84%	16%	—N/a	—	—N/a	—N/a	51%	49%	—N/a	
28 November – 2 December 2022	Institute of Public Affairs	1000	45%	27%	28%	30%	49%	21%	57%	10%	33%	21%	50%	29%	27%	32%	41%	(Note: The Institute of Public Affairs also published results for voters supporting teal independents (Y 39%, N 33%, DK 28%).)
28 November 2022	The federal National Party announces its opposition.																	
5–10 October 2022	SEC Newgate	1207	64%	—N/a	—N/a	37%	—N/a	—N/a	78%	—N/a	—N/a	—	—N/a	—N/a	—	—N/a	—N/a	
7 October 2022	Compass Polling	1001	75%	25%	—N/a	45%	55%	—N/a	82%	18%	—N/a	12%	88%	—N/a	52%	48%	—N/a	(Note: Compass Polling also published results for voters supporting the United Australia Party (Y 47%, N 53%) and independents (Y 54%, N 46%).)
11–15 August 2022	SEC Newgate	1804	55%	—N/a	—N/a	41%	—N/a	—N/a	83%	—N/a	—N/a	—	—N/a	—N/a	47%	—N/a	—N/a	
3–7 August 2022	Essential	1075	77%	23%	—N/a	53%	47%	—N/a	81%	19%	—N/a	—	—N/a	—N/a	56%	44%	—N/a	
30 July 2022	PM Anthony Albanese reveals draft amendment wording.																	
11–24 July 2022	Scanlon Institute	5757	70%	—N/a	—N/a	40%	—N/a	—N/a	86%	—N/a	—N/a	—	—N/a	—N/a	46%	—N/a	—N/a	
13–15 July 2022	Australia Institute	1001	70%	8%	22%	56%	23%	21%	82%	7%	12%	59%	25%	16%	65%	7%	28%	
14–17 June 2022	Australia Institute	1001	60%	8%	23%	49%	26%	25%	71%	15%	15%	35%	28%	37%	48%	13%	39%	
25–30 May 2022	Essential	1089	66%	—N/a	—N/a	44%	—N/a	—N/a	77%	—N/a	—N/a	—	—N/a	—N/a	50%	—N/a	—N/a	
23–27 May 2022	SEC Newgate	1403	69%	—N/a	—N/a	40%	—N/a	—N/a	82%	—N/a	—N/a	—	—N/a	—N/a	55%	—N/a	—N/a	
21 May 2022	Labor wins the 2022 federal election, pledging a first-term referendum.																	
2–6 May 2019	Essential	1079	55%	—N/a	—N/a	31%	—N/a	—N/a	65%	—N/a	—N/a	—	—N/a	—N/a	37%	—N/a	—N/a	
15–18 February 2018	Newspoll	1632	76%	16%	8%	38%	48%	14%	87%	10%	3%	38%	50%	12%	—	—N/a	—N/a	
5–7 December 2017	Australia Institute	1417	50%	26%	24%	41%	35%	24%	75%	10%	15%	23%	48%	29%	41%	28%	31%	
3–6 November 2017	Essential	1025	61%	—N/a	—N/a	37%	24%	39%	67%	—N/a	—N/a	—	—N/a	—N/a	—	—N/a	—N/a	
3–10 August 2017	Omnipoll	1526	67%	24%	9%	55%	41%	4%	80%	10%	10%	—	—N/a	—N/a	45%	46%	9%	
1–5 June 2017	Essential	1013	51%	—N/a	—N/a	—	—N/a	—N/a	74%	—N/a	—N/a	—	—N/a	—N/a	—	—N/a	—N/a	
26 May 2017	In the Uluru Statement, Indigenous leaders call for a constitutional Voice.																	

== Other polls ==
=== Aboriginal and Torres Strait Islander Australians ===
Two polls surveying Aboriginal and Torres Strait Islander people's views on the Indigenous Voice commissioned in early 2023 by The Uluru Dialogue, a pro-Voice lobby group, were conducted online by Ipsos and YouGov. Both found broad support for the Voice: 80% in the Ipsos survey and 83% in the YouGov survey. The YouGov result compared to 51% support in the broader population. These results have been cited by Yes campaign figures, including Prime Minister Anthony Albanese, as evidence for broad Indigenous support for the Voice.

The ABC conducted a review of Indigenous-specific polling in August 2023, consulting with polling experts Kevin Bonham, William Bowe, and Simon Jackman. All agreed there was nothing to suggest "anything other than broad support among First Nations Australians" and particularly endorsed the YouGov poll. Caveats included the small sample size associated with the Ipsos poll, the recency of the polls (both having been months out of date at the time of the review) and questions over whether online samples adequately represented remote Indigenous communities, although this was noted as a lesser concern given that the proportion of Indigenous people living in remote areas is often overestimated.

Late in the campaign, Resolve Strategic found 59% of Indigenous Australians in support, compared to 44% support in the broader population. This was a considerable decrease from the near-80% support in the Ipsos and YouGov polls, but still represented a majority. Another late poll from Focaldata found about 70% in support, but the firm urged caution in interpreting the figure because it was based on a sample of about 250 Indigenous Australians.

Passing the Message Stick, a research group aiming to discover strategies for a Yes victory in the referendum, found in a telephone survey 24% of Indigenous people opposed the Voice and 42% either did not know about the referendum or had heard very little. These results was initially presented in a webinar with a limited audience (400 people), but later more widely reported. The results have been cited by No campaigners to dispute the Yes campaign's perspective of broad Indigenous support. However, the ABC excluded this survey from consideration in their review of Indigenous-specific polling, because not enough information about its results and methodologies was publicly available.

The No campaign conducted three internal polls on Indigenous support from February to May 2023, though only two results were publicly released, showing a fall in support from 60% in February to 57% in May. These results compared with 59% (February) and 54% (May) support among the broader population. These polls were not publicly reported until early October. No details were provided regarding sample sizes, precise questions asked, or methodologies.

Indigenous Voice polls surveying Indigenous Australians
Dates	Firm	Sample	Yes	No	DK	Ref.
22 September–4 October 2023	Resolve	420	59%	41%	—N/a	
18 September–2 October 2023	Focaldata	250	70%	30%	—N/a	
May 2023	No campaign	—N/a	57%	—N/a	—N/a	
1–21 March 2023	YouGov	732	83%	14%	4%	
February 2023	No campaign	—N/a	60%	—N/a	—N/a	
February 2023	Passing the Message Stick	219	—N/a	24%	—N/a	
20–24 January 2023	Ipsos	300	80%	10%	10%	
November 2016–May 2017	Cox Inall Ridgeway	300	80%	—N/a	—N/a	

=== Weighted media audience surveys ===
Some media organisations have surveyed their audiences about their views, then weighted the results by various demographic factors in an attempt to make the results nationally representative.

Weighted media audience surveys on establishing an Indigenous Voice
Dates	Media organisation	Sample	Yes	No	DK	Ref.
22 August–4 September 2023	Australian Community Media	8600	34%	61%	5%	
16–26 June 2023	Australian Community Media	10131	38%	55%	7%	
10–21 April 2022	Australian Broadcasting Corporation	292457	73%	16%	11%	
10–28 April 2019	Australian Broadcasting Corporation	368097	64%	22%	14%	

=== Australian Reconciliation Barometer ===
Since 2018, Reconciliation Australia has included a question in its biennial poll, the Australian Reconciliation Barometer, on whether it is important to "protect a First Nations Body in the Constitution". Although this poll has drawn academic attention, there is some dispute over whether the data from this question is suitable for discovering public opinion on the Indigenous Voice. Francis Markham and William Sanders included the question in their analysis, taking respondents indicating importance to be expressing support for the Voice and respondents indicating unimportance, opposition. Murray Goot, terming the question "quite general", did not believe it specifically referred to the Voice.

Australian Reconciliation Barometer polls
Date(s)	Firm	Sample	Important	Unimportant	Ref.
21 July–28 August 2022	Polity Research	2522	79%	21%	
1–15 July 2020	Polity Research	1988	81%	19%	
16–30 July 2018	Polity Research	1995	77%	23%	
