= Matthew Scully =

American political writer and speechwriter

- Born: March 30, 1959 (age 67); Casper, Wyoming
- Occupations: Journalist, political writer

Matthew Scully (born March 30, 1959) is an American author, journalist, and political writer who has also written on animal welfare.

== Early life ==
Scully was born in Casper, Wyoming and lived his childhood throughout Colorado, Ohio, and New York. He attended Arizona State University in the 1980s. He married Emmanuelle Boers in 1998. In 2008 when Matthew was working in the McCain campaign, John McCain lost to Barack Obama, afterwards in 2013, they moved from Los Angeles, California, to a Suburb of Phoenix, Arizona where they currently live.

== Career ==
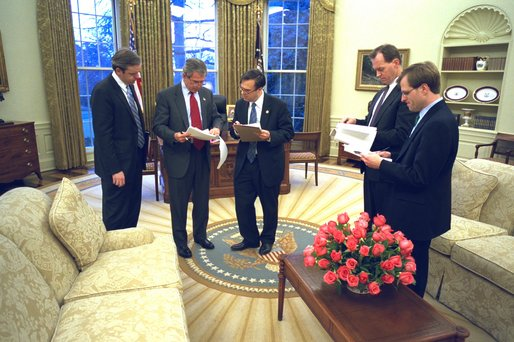
President George W. Bush prepares his State of the Union speech with Dan Bartlett, White House Communications Director, at left, Mike Gerson, director of Presidential Speechwriting, and speech writers Matthew Scully and John McConnell in the Oval Office Thursday, January 23, 2003.

Scully worked as a speechwriter in the 2000 presidential campaign, and served as a special assistant and senior speechwriter for President George W. Bush from January 2001 to August 2004. He also wrote speeches for vice-presidents Dan Quayle, Dick Cheney, and Mike Pence, as well as Governor Robert P. Casey of Pennsylvania, and Bob Dole.

In an article in The Atlantic, Scully accused former White House chief speechwriter Michael Gerson of wrongfully taking credit for speeches written by Scully and other members of President George W. Bush's speechwriting team. Scully served as literary editor of National Review and has written for The New York Times, The Wall Street Journal, The Washington Post, The Los Angeles Times, The Atlantic Monthly, and The American Conservative.

=== Palin acceptance speech ===
Prior to the 2008 Republican National Convention, Senator John McCain (the Republican presidential nominee to-be) asked Scully to write the acceptance speech for his vice presidential nominee, whom McCain had not yet chosen. Scully wrote the speech two weeks before the convention. He wrote the speech for a man to deliver, not a woman. Four days before the convention, Scully was surprised when he was informed that Alaska Governor Sarah Palin was to be McCain's running mate. Scully then worked all night to tailor the speech to Palin and also to incorporate new campaign strategy shifts that were being rapidly formed in intensive discussions by McCain campaign staff.

Palin delivered the 40-minute speech at the convention on September 3, 2008.

=== Melania Trump 2016 convention speech ===
Scully was hired along with John McConnell to write "the biggest speech of Melania Trump’s life," to be delivered on July 18, 2016, at the 2016 Republican National Convention. Scully and McConnell sent Ms. Trump a draft a month before the convention; however, one of Ms. Trump's writers rewrote most of the speech herself, inserting "word-for-word repetition of phrases" from Michelle Obama's speech at the 2008 Democratic National Convention, leading to focused criticism of the writer.

== Animal welfare ==
Scully is the author of Dominion: The Power of Man, the Suffering of Animals, and the Call to Mercy (2002), described by Natalie Angier in a review published in The New York Times (October 27, 2002) as a "horrible, wonderful, important book.... because the author, an avowed conservative Republican and former speechwriter for George W. Bush, is an unexpected defender of the animals against the depredations of profit driven corporations, swaggering, proponents of renewed 'harvesting' of whales and elephants and others who insist that all of nature is humanity's romper room, to play with, rearrange, and plunder at will." Nichols Fox in a review published in The Washington Post wrote that Dominion is "destined to become a classic defense of mercy."

As a conservative, Scully argues that mankind has dominion over animals but should be compassionate and merciful in their treatment towards them. He argues from a Christian animal welfare position and is not an animal rights activist. Scully argues against the philosophies of "no-pain theorists" who hold that animals are not conscious or do not feel pain, including Stephen Budiansky, Peter Carruthers and David Oderberg. The book strongly argues against using animals for food (factory farming) and sport (hunting). The book was positively reviewed in the journal Animal Law, which noted that "Dominion asks tough questions and forces us to face the reality of civilization's needless cruelty toward animals."

== Selected publications ==
- Scully, Matthew (2003-10-01). Dominion: The Power of Man, the Suffering of Animals, and the Call to Mercy (paperback and Kindle Edition). New York City: St. Martin's Griffin. ISBN 978-0-312-31973-1. "ISBN0312319738."
- Scully wrote a chapter ("Fear factories: the case for conservatism for animals") of the book "CAFO (concentrated animal feeding operation): the tragedy of industrial animal factories" (Daniel Imhoff, editor). San Rafael, California : Earth Aware, c2010. ISBN 9781601090584
- Scully, Matthew (2013-10-07). "Pro-Life, Pro-Animal: The conscience of a pro-life, vegan conservative". National Review Online.
