= Animal law =

Statutory and case law on animals

Animal law is a combination of statutory and case law in which the nature – legal, social or biological – of nonhuman animals is an important factor. Animal law encompasses companion animals, wildlife, animals used in entertainment and animals raised for food and research. The emerging field of animal law is often analogized to the environmental law movement because "animal law faces many of the same legal and strategic challenges that environmental law faced in seeking to establish a more secure foothold in the United States and abroad".

Animal law issues encompass a broad spectrum of approaches – from philosophical explorations of the rights of animals to pragmatic discussions about the rights of those who use animals, who has standing to sue when an animal is harmed in a way that violates the law, and what constitutes legal cruelty. Animal law permeates and affects most traditional areas of the law – including tort, contract, criminal and constitutional law. Examples of this intersection include:

- animal custody disputes in divorce or separations
- veterinary malpractice cases
- housing disputes involving "no pets" policies and discrimination laws
- damages cases involving the wrongful death or injury to a companion animal
- enforceable trusts for companions being adopted by states across the country
- criminal law – anti-cruelty laws.

== Organizations ==
A growing number of state and local bar associations now have animal law committees. The Animal Legal Defense Fund, founded in 1979, was the first organization dedicated to promoting the field of animal law and using the law to protect the lives and advance the interests of animals.

In the Swiss canton of Zurich an animal lawyer, Antoine Goetschel, was employed by the canton government to represent the interests of animals in animal cruelty cases from 2007 through 2010, when the Zurich Animal Advocate position was abolished. In this capacity, Goetschel attempted to ensure that Swiss animal protection laws, which are among the strictest in the world, were correctly enforced.

The Animal Defenders Office is an Australian community legal centre focusing on animal law.

In South Africa, Animal Law Reform South Africa is the first dedicated animal law organisation in the country working in the areas of 1. Legislative and Policy Reform; 2. Litigation and Legal Services and 3. Education and Research

== Animal law in academia ==
=== North America ===
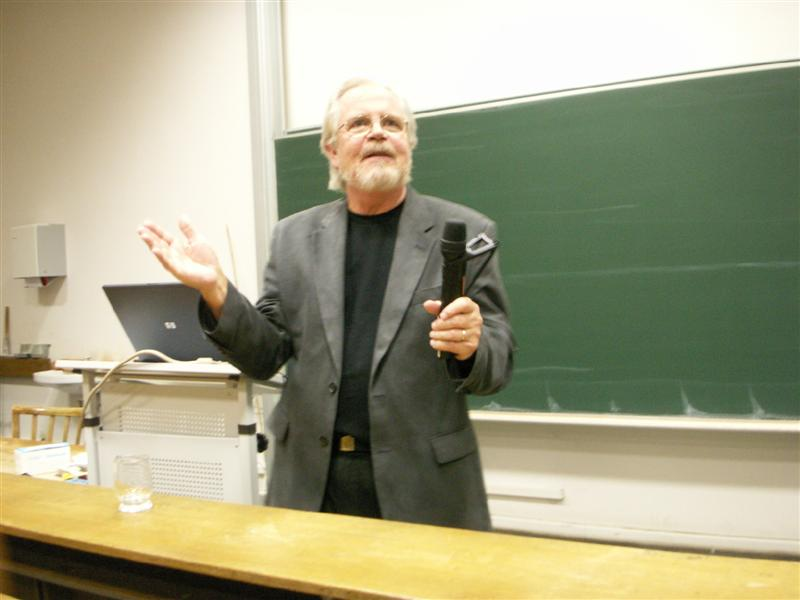
Prominent animal rights scholar Tom Regan

As of 2020, animal law is being taught in 167 law schools in the US and Canada, including Harvard, Stanford, UCLA, Northwestern, University of Michigan, Georgetown, Duke, and Lewis & Clark.

The comprehensive Canadian animal law casebook is Animals and the Law (Essentials of Canadian Law).

The comprehensive American animal law casebook is Animal Law: Cases and Materials. Because animal law is not a traditional legal field, most of the book's chapters are framed in terms of familiar subsets of law such as tort, contract, criminal and constitutional law. Each chapter sets out cases and commentary where animal law affects those broader areas.

The Animal Protection Laws of the United States of America & Canada compendium, by Stephan K. Otto, Director of Legislative Affairs for the Animal Legal Defense Fund, is a comprehensive animal protection laws collection. It contains a detailed survey of the general animal protection and related statutes for all of the states, principal districts and territories of the United States of America, and for all of Canada; along with full-text versions of each jurisdiction's laws.

=== South America ===
Animal law is being taught in a few European universities in Brazil, Argentina and Chile.

Several Brazilian universities offers Animal Law subjects such as Federal University of Bahia (at Graduate Program in Law), the University of São Paulo (at undergraduate level), the Federal University of Paraná (at undergraduate level), Federal University of Santa Maria (at Graduate Program in Law) and the Federal University of Rio de Janeiro (at undergraduate level). These courses are taught in Portuguese.

According to Tagore Trajano Silva:

The foregoing groups have contributed to the progress and redesign of the curricula of law schools in Brazil. They have created new alternatives, possibilities, and understandings, important both for the defense of the non-human animals and for humans. The next step is the formation of a solid political base in order to generate effective legislative change, and thus the realization of animal law. During the year 2013, events were organized, focusing on the need to mobilize the Brazilian legislature to attend to the issue of animals. These meetings focused, both politically and legally, on the best means to support the animal law debate. It is time to insert animal law into the curriculum of the Brazilian law schools. As a result, in 2014, Brasilia, the Brazilian political capital, will hold the fourth World Conference, with the theme Posthumanism: challenges and perspectives. The goal is to develop a future scenario for putting these ideas in practice.

=== Australasia ===
Books on the subject for this geographical area include:

- Animal Law in Australia: An Integrated Approach (2011) by Alex Bruce. ISBN 9780409327267
- Humanising Animals: Civilising People (2011) by Mirko Bagaric, Keith Akers. ISBN 9781921948602
- Animal law in Australia and New Zealand (2010) by Deborah Cao, Katrina Sharman. ISBN 9780455226187
- Animal Law in Australasia: Continuing the Dialogue (2013) by Peter J Sankoff, Steven White, Celeste Black. ISBN 9781862879300
- Handbook of Australian Cruelty Law (2009) by Malcolm Caulfield. ISBN 9780646505459

=== Europe ===
Animal law is being taught in a few European universities in Spain, Switzerland and the United Kingdom.

The Autonomous University of Barcelona (UAB), in Spain, is the only European university to offer a master's degree in Animal Law and Society (Derecho Animal y Sociedad). The highly interdisciplinary program, directed by Prof. Dr. Teresa Giménez-Candela, is taught in Spanish and English. It aims to provide students knowledge of animals in the fields of law, ethology, nutrition and welfare, ethical dimensions, artistic representations and entertainment, organization and social responsibility. The program is based on a comparative law perspective, keeping in mind the needs of society as a whole. A postgraduate diploma is also available in that specific field.

Initially, the Autonomous University of Barcelona Law School was the first Spanish university to officially offer optional courses in "Animal Law and Animal Welfare Law: comparative perspective (Derecho Animal y Derecho del Bienestar Animal: perspectiva comparada)" in 2007–2008. Due to student demand, a Postgraduate Degree in Animal Law and Society was established in 2009–2010. The first edition of the Master's program in Animal Law and Society was launched in 2011–2012 and is currently accepting students for its eighth edition (Oct. 2018 – Dec. 2019). UAB also offers an online Master's in Animal Law and Society, and is currently accepting applications for its fifth edition (Jan. 2019 – Oct. 2019).

=== Asia ===
KIMEP University in Almaty, Kazakhstan, introduced a course of Animal Law in 2013 upon initiative of Dr. Maria Baideldinova (Assistant Professor, KIMEP School of Law).

=== Africa ===
While still a burgeoning field in Africa, animal law is definitively growing. In 2022, the first Animal Law Course will be taught in South Africa by founding directors of Animal Law Reform South Africa, which will be an online course, giving access to the subject to South African and African students for the first time on the continent.

== Legal changes influenced by animal rights activists ==
Regarding the campaign to change the status of animals as property, the animal rights activists have seen success in several countries. In 1992, Switzerland amended its constitution to recognize animals as beings and not things. However, in 1999, the Swiss constitution was completely rewritten. A decade later, Germany guaranteed rights to animals in a 2002 amendment to its constitution, becoming the first European Union member to do so. The German Civil Code had been amended correspondingly in 1997. The amendment, however, has not had much impact in German legal practice yet. In 2015 the National Assembly of the Province of Quebec adopted a modification of the Quebec Civil Code according animals the status of sentient beings instead of property, as previously.

The greatest success of the animal rights activists has certainly been the granting of basic rights to five great ape species in New Zealand in 1999. Their use is now forbidden in research, testing or teaching. (The UK government banned experiments on great apes in 1986.) Some other countries have also banned or severely restricted the use of non-human great apes in research.

The Seattle-based Great Ape Project (GAP) – founded by Australian philosopher Peter Singer, the author of Animal Liberation, widely regarded as the founding philosophical work of the animal liberation movement – is campaigning for the United Nations to adopt its Declaration on Great Apes, which would see chimpanzees, gorillas and orangutans included in a "community of equals" with human beings. The declaration wants to extend to the non-human apes the protection of three basic interests: the right to life, the protection of individual liberty, and the prohibition of torture.

New Zealand has effectively phased out live exports for slaughter purposes since 2007 due to concerns about animals.

== See also ==
- Abolitionism (animal rights)
- Animal ethics
- Animal Law Review
- Animal Rights Law
- Animal rights by country or territory
- Animal trial
- Animal welfare
- Animal Welfare Act
- Brazilian Abolitionist Movement for Animal liberation
- Commodity status of animals
- Hunting Act 2004
- Intrinsic value (animal ethics)
- Legal status of animals in Canada
- Society for Animal Protective Legislation

== Bibliography ==
- Bernstein, Robin (August 2005). "Animal Law: Yesterday and Today" (PDF). New Jersey Lawyer. Archived from the original (PDF) on June 16, 2006 – via animallawprogram.org.
- Sriram, Chaitra (May 20, 2008). "Animal law for "least protected" and "most innocent"". The UW Daily. Seattle.
- Jones, Brent (March 29, 2008). "Fido, Fluffy Become More High Profile Part of Law". USA Today. Archived from the original on March 30, 2016.
