= Animal welfare and rights in Brazil =

Animal welfare and rights in Brazil is about the laws concerning and treatment of non-human animals in Brazil. Brazil is a leading producer of animal products, and its allowance of intensive animal farming methods such as extreme confinement make farm animal welfare a major concern.

Compared to other countries, Brazil also uses large numbers of animals for fur and research. Recent years have seen several welfare reforms by the government and major meat producers.

== Regulations ==
Brazil's first animal welfare law was a 1924 decree prohibiting "carrying out any behavior or recreation that cause[s] suffering to animals." A more comprehensive 1934 decree stipulated that animals not be overworked or kept where they cannot breathe properly, move, or rest, or are deprived of air or light, and that animals be given a quick death (whether or not they are for human consumption). The decree also prohibits abandoning a sick, injured or mutilated animal and failing to provide an animal with "all that is necessary", including veterinary assistance. Lawyers from the Public Ministry or from animal protection organizations are allowed to assist animals in court, giving animals a degree of legal standing which they lack in many countries such as the United States.

Brazil's constitution (1988) states that the government must protect animals from cruelty. In 1997 this constitutional protection was invoked in a historic decision by the Brazilian Supreme Court to uphold a ban on Farra do Boi, a festival involving the torture and killing of bulls and oxen in the state of Santa Catarina.

A 1998 law prohibits the abuse of domestic and wild animals. It imposes more serious penalties for cruelty than the 1934 decree, with a sentence of 3 months to a year plus a fine, with the penalty increased by one-sixth to one-third if the animal is killed. A 2012 update to the Penal Code increased the penalty for cruelty from 3 months–1 year to 1–4 years, and up to 6 years if the animal is killed.

The 1998 does not specifically address farm animals. A 2000 Normative Instruction regulates pre-slaughter handling and slaughter methods, stating handling must minimize stress and forbids the use of "aggressive instruments in slaughter". 2008 instructions establish procedures for rearing and transporting animals and provide for the production of Manuals of Good Practice (whose adoption is voluntary). In that year the Ministry of Agriculture, Livestock, and Food Supply established the Permanent Technical Commission of Animal Welfare, whose tasks include the promotion of animal welfare-related events, the training of those involved in the livestock chain, and the publication and dissemination of technical material on animal welfare.

Birds, which make up the large majority of land animals slaughtered for food in Brazil, are exempt from laws governing transport or export that affect animal welfare.

In 2008 Brazil passed its first federal regulation specifically addressing animals in scientific research. The 2008 law provides for the creation of a National Animal Control and Experimentation Committee and institutional Ethical Committees on Animal Use, which are to follow the principles of the Three Rs: replacement of animals with non-animal methods, reduction of the number of animals used, and refinement of techniques used on animals.

In 2014, Brazil banned most animal cosmetics testing, though testing ingredients with unknown effects on animals is allowed, as is testing on animals in other countries and selling the resulting products in Brazil.

In 2014, Brazil received a C out of possible grades A, B, C, D, E, F, G on World Animal Protection's Animal Protection Index.

In September 29 of 2020, president Jair Bolsonaro sanctioned a law that imposes more severe punishment for mistreatment of animals, namely dogs and cats. It increases the penalty to 2–5 years of imprisonment and a fine, and forbids the convict to own animals.

== Animals used for food ==
=== Agriculture and animals ===
A 2014 source states that Brazil has the world's second-largest cattle herd (behind India) at 187 million animals. In 2009 Brazil had the fourth-largest chicken population (behind China, the U.S., and Indonesia) at around 1.2 billion.

A 2012 report states that Brazil is the fifth-largest producer of pig meat, fourth-largest producer of turkey meat, third-largest producer of chicken meat, and second-largest producer of cattle meat.

A 2014 source states that Brazil is the second-largest fish consumer in the world (behind Japan) at 12 kg per person per year. Brazil produces about 1.25 million tons of fish per year, with around 38% coming from aquaculture.

==== Intensive animal farming ====
Brazilian animal farms have been shifting towards a confinement model. Battery cages, gestation crates, and veal crates - systems of extreme confinement - are legal in Brazil. At any given time, there are over 70 million egg-laying hens living in battery cages and almost 1.5 million breeding sows in gestation crates.

In 2014, BRF - Brazil's largest pork producer - committed to phasing out the continuous use of gestation crates from its supply chain by 2026. In 2015, JBS - the world's largest animal protein processing company - announced plans to phase out all use of gestation crates at company-owned facilities by 2016, and the Brazilian Pork Producers Association announced that it will lead a study concerning a transition to higher-welfare group housing systems.

==== Transport and animals ====
The welfare of animals in transport is a major issue. Brazil is the world's leading exporter of live cattle and chicken Exported animals face severe welfare threats, as highlighted by the 2012 incident in which 2700 cattle died in the heat on a vessel attempting to unload at ports in the Middle East. Transport within Brazil is also a problem. Poor road conditions and weather often make journeys to the slaughterhouse last sixty or more hours, leading to extreme stress and death for the animals.

==== Government involvement ====
The government actively encourages the growth of the animal agriculture industry. From 2007 to 2009 the Brazilian National Development Bank invested $2.65 billion in the country's three largest beef suppliers. In 2010, the Agriculture and Livestock Plan doubled the credits available to the industry. In 2012, the government announced a plan to invest $2 billion until 2014 "to double catches and reach two million tons of fish annually."

=== Vegetarianism and veganism ===
In a 2012 survey of Brazilians, approximately 8% of respondents identified as vegetarian. The percentage of vegetarians was higher among those 65–75 years old (10%) than those aged 20–24 (7%). The study did not measure the number of vegans.

== Animals used for clothing ==
Brazil is one of the biggest producers of chinchilla fur in the world.

In 2014 the state of São Paulo banned most fur farming, imposing a fine of at least 10,000 reais (approximately US$2880) for offenders.

== Animals used in science ==
A total of 3,497,653 animals were used in research published in 18 journals in the State of Paraná in 2006. From this the authors conclude that "it can be extrapolated that, in the whole of Brazil, the total number of animals used every year is extremely high in terms of the worldwide use of animals in experimentation."

== Animal personhood ==
In 2005, a writ of habeas corpus was requested for Suíça, a chimpanzee caged in allegedly inadequate conditions at a zoo. The court agreed to hear the case, but Suica died before a decision could be made. According to Gordilho, "This was the first case that recognised a chimpanzee as a plaintiff that achieved standing in a court of law through representatives."

Several years earlier, a habeas corpus petition to release a caged bird had been dismissed.

Aftermath, these activists founded a peer-reviewed open access academic journal, which is named as Brazilian Animal Law Journal (In Portuguese: Revista Brasileira de Direito Animal). This journal is the first academic journal of Latin America specialized in Animal Law.

== Animal activism ==
According to World Animal Protection, Brazil has "a thriving animal protection movement dating back to the 19th century." Two Brazilian groups were represented at the 1910 International Congress of animal protection organizations in Washington, D.C. (compared with much larger delegations from Europe, the U.S., and Canada).

The Brazilian No More Cruelty! movement is aimed at increasing sentences for animal cruelty. In January 2012, in over 150 cities thousands of protesters marched under the No More Cruelty! slogan. On Paulista Avenue, São Paulo alone there were 10,000 protesters. Later that year, changes to the Penal Code included an increase in the penalty for cruelty from 3 months-1 year to 1–4 years, and up to 6 years if the animal is killed. Sentences of 1–4 years were assigned to neglect and abandonment, promoting or participating in cockfighting was given up to 6 years. In 2013, No More Cruelty! protests were again held in over 165 cities.

Domestic animal protection organizations include ProAnima, which focuses on ending the use of animals in circuses and horse carting and stopping the slaughter of street dogs and cats, and Fórum Nacional de Proteção e Defesa Animal, which addresses a range of companion and farm animal issues. Both were involved in the Be Cruelty-Free Brazil campaign to ban cosmetics testing.

Humane Society International is active in Brazil, having led the Be Cruelty-Free Brazil campaign which resulted in the partial ban on cosmetics testing and working with civil societies to promote Meatless Monday.

== See also ==
- Animal rights movement
- Animal protectionism
- Abolitionism (animal rights)
- Animal consciousness
- History of vegetarianism
- List of animal rights advocates
- Vegetarianism by country
- Brazilian Abolitionist Movement for Animal liberation
