= Animal Rights Law =

2023 book by Raffael N. Fasel and Sean C. Butler

- First edition cover
- Authors: Raffael N. Fasel; Sean C. Butler
- Language: English
- Subject: Animal rights law
- Publisher: Hart Publishing
- Publication date: 23 February 2023
- Publication place: United Kingdom
- Media type: Hardcover, paperback, ebook
- Pages: 240
- ISBN: 978-1-5099-5646-3
- OCLC: 1334883136
- Website: bloomsburyonlineresources.com/animal-rights-law

Animal Rights Law is a 2023 textbook by Raffael N. Fasel and Sean C. Butler, published by Hart Publishing. It surveys the development of animal rights law and related legal and philosophical debates. The book compares how different legal systems classify and protect non-human animals, addresses theories of animal rights and personhood, and discusses litigation and legislative efforts concerning animals' legal status. It draws on material from more than 30 jurisdictions and includes case studies, theoretical discussion, and examples from civil and common law traditions. Reviewers described it as a clear introductory text on animal rights law.

== Summary ==
The book outlines the legal status of animals in different jurisdictions, noting that most legal systems treat them as property, although some recognise them as sentient beings. It reviews categories of protection such as anti-cruelty and welfare laws, and considers constitutional and statutory reforms in several countries.

One section contrasts three main positions: animal welfare theory, which permits animal use under humane conditions; abolitionism, which calls for an end to animal exploitation; and "new welfarism", which supports incremental reforms as steps toward stronger protections. The authors relate these debates to philosophical approaches associated with Peter Singer, Tom Regan, Martha Nussbaum, and Sue Donaldson and Will Kymlicka.

Fasel and Butler also compare theories of legal rights, including the choice, or will, theory, which links rights to autonomy, and the interest theory, which bases rights on significant welfare interests. They discuss whether animals could qualify as legal persons and how their classification as property affects legal protection.

The book includes case studies of habeas corpus petitions brought on behalf of individual animals, including the orangutan Sandra in Argentina and the elephant Happy in New York. It also examines legislative efforts to codify animal rights at national and international levels, as well as issues of enforcement and the effects of economic and political interests.

The final chapter compares animal rights advocacy with other reform movements and considers its relationship to human rights discourse.

== Reception ==
In the Environmental Law Review, Angus Nurse described the book as a clear and balanced overview that combines accessibility with academic rigour. He praised its comparative scope and its treatment of "thick" and "thin" conceptions of rights, though he suggested further engagement with the relationship between animal and human rights.

Katy Sowery, writing in The Modern Law Review, commended the book's clarity and coverage of key debates, while noting that it emphasises breadth over critical depth. She described it as a useful resource for students entering the field.

Bianka M. A. Atlas, in the Journal of International Wildlife Law & Policy, described the book as a comprehensive and accessible overview of the field. She noted its interdisciplinary approach and international coverage, but suggested that readers supplement it with additional sources for advanced study.

Andrew Rowan reviewed the book for WellBeing International, calling it an informative and well-organised introduction that connects legal analysis with ethical discussion.

== Publication ==
Animal Rights Law was published on 23 February 2023 by Hart Publishing, an imprint of Bloomsbury Publishing, in hardcover, paperback, and ebook formats. A website was published alongside the book, providing updates on relevant case law and legislation, supplementary chapter references, jurisdiction-specific sources, and a list of key academic journals.

== See also ==
- Animal rights by country or territory
