= Antoine Goetschel =

Swiss lawyer (born 1958)

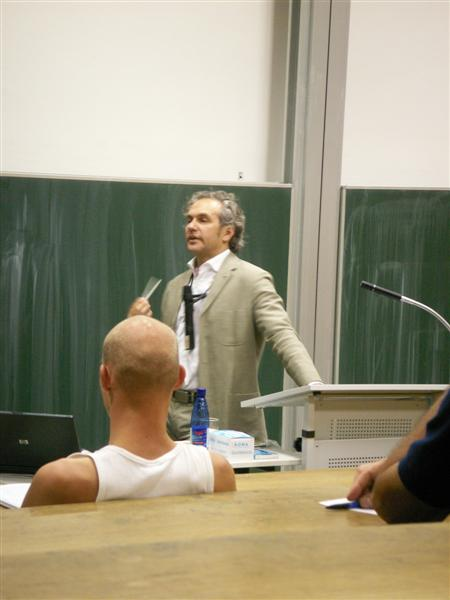
Antoine Goetschel

Antoine François Goetschel (born 1958) is a Swiss lawyer who has focused on animal rights law. In cases involving animal abuse, he was appointed to defend the rights of the animal in question. He played a prominent role lobbying for the unsuccessful March 2010 Swiss referendum which would have provided legal representation to all animals involved in Swiss court cases.

== Career ==
Goetschel serves as the animal advocate for the canton of Zurich. In 2007 he was appointed by the canton government to represent the interests of animals in animal cruelty cases. In this capacity, he attempts to insure that the Swiss animal protection laws, which are among the strictest in the world, are correctly enforced. Goetschel does not bring charges in this role, but rather focuses on explaining law, evaluating precedent, and appealing verdicts. He says that a third of his legal work is devoted to cases involving animals and the rest of his time is spent in private practice. His work has been praised by Peter Singer.

In 2011, the office of Zurich animal advocate was abolished and the canton veterinary office took charge of animal cruelty cases. Goetschel plans to continue to advocate for animal rights causes by writing books on the subject.

=== Notable cases ===
Most of Goetschel's cases involve abuse of domestic pets, such as the case in which he secured a large fine against a woman who abandoned two kittens shortly after purchasing them. Goetschel has represented a variety of animals during his tenure as an animal lawyer, however. In February 2010, he argued on behalf of a pike that was caught by an angler. He made the case that the amount of time the angler had spent fighting the fish caused the fish to "suffer excessively." Although the court ruled against him, he is currently appealing the judgment. He has also prosecuted on behalf of fish that were used in a game show episode in which contestants attempted to catch them by hand, arguing that the contestants did not treat the fish with the dignity they deserved. He ultimately lost the case on a technicality.

== Animal rights ==
Goetschel became interested in animal rights at age 23 after an accident left him temporarily unable to speak. This experience caused him to reflect on animal suffering. He later became a vegetarian and became active in the animal rights movement. He has played a prominent role in lobbying for Swiss animal rights legislation. Although not officially a representative of the campaign, he devoted much of his time to lobbying on behalf of the March 2010 Swiss animal law referendum. Had it passed, it would have led to the Swiss government hiring other animal advocates in addition to Goetschel. He also lobbied on behalf of 2003 law which led to animals being treated as sentient beings, rather than property, in Swiss law.

== See also ==
- List of animal rights advocates
