= Animal Defenders Office =

Australian animal law organisation

- Founded: 2013
- Founders: Tara Ward, Shelley Landmark
- Type: Community Legal Centre
- Purpose: Animal law
- Location: Canberra, ACT, Australia
- Affiliations: National Association of Community Legal Centres, Community Legal Centres NSW
- Website: www.ado.org.au

The Animal Defenders Office (ADO) is an Australian community legal centre focusing on animal law, specialising in issues surrounding impounded dogs, assistance animals, the setting up animal of charities, and the defence of animal activists. The ADO is also involved in a range of community outreach and advocacy activities, including the production of legal fact sheets, presentations in public education forums, community events, and university panels, and involvement with local animal advocacy groups. It is a member of the National Association of Community Legal Centres in Australia, and as such is a not-for-profit organisation that provides free legal advice to the community and advocates for law reform.

== Key cases ==
=== Animal Liberation ACT v Conservator of Flora and Fauna [2014] ACAT 35 ===
In 2014, Animal Liberation ACT contested the decision of the ACT’s Conservator of Flora and Fauna to issue licenses that would allow for the killing of over 1,600 kangaroos in nature reserves in the ACT region. The Animal Defenders Office represented Animal Liberation in the case at the ACT Civil and Administrative Tribunal, arguing that the scientific evidence in favour of the culls was not strong enough and had been presented by a potentially biased source, and that there were other, non-lethal options available to address to perceived problem of kangaroo overgrazing. The case was decided in favour of the Conservator, with a resulting 1,519 kangaroos and 514 in-pouch joeys subsequently killed.

== Law reform ==
The ADO frequently makes submissions to governmental inquiries that directly or indirectly concern animal issues. For example, in recent years, submissions have been made to the Canterbury-Bankstown City Council on their policy surrounding the use of exotic animals in circuses, the NSW Senate’s Select Committee on Landowner Protection from Unauthorised Filming or Surveillance, and the Australian Maritime Safety Authority in regards to their safety policies surrounding live export of livestock.

The ADO has also pushed for law reform in the area of social justice more broadly, as with their submission to the Australian Parliament’s Joint Select Committee on Constitutional Recognition Relating to Aboriginal and Torres Strait Islander Peoples.

=== Greyhound racing ===
The ADO has been particularly active in the area of greyhound racing policy. In 2015, a Special Commission of Inquiry in the Greyhound Racing Industry was established by the Governor of New South Wales. In the Commission’s final report, the submission by the Animal Defenders Office was mentioned several times. The ADO highlighted the detrimental influence that the industry has on communities due to its treatment of greyhounds, and drew attention to the pernicious social problems that are associated with problem gambling.

== Animal activism ==
=== Eastern grey kangaroo culls ===
Since 2008, the Australian Capital Territory (ACT) government has conducted a cull of Eastern grey kangaroos in order to prevent over-grazing, with the most recent cull targeting up to 3253 kangaroos. The ADO has stood alongside other advocacy groups, such as Animal Liberation ACT, in criticising the annual cull. Tara Ward, the Executive Director of the ADO, has publicly spoken out against the culls, calling into question the scientific legitimacy of the practice, and arguing that it cannot be conducted humanely. In particular, the ADO has also brought the attention of the Government to the issue of the joeys that are orphaned during the process of the culls. These joeys are unable to fend for themselves, and are more likely to perish without the care of their mothers.

As part of its continued advocacy for kangaroos, in 2017, the ADO organised a public presentation on the changes to the legal status of Eastern grey kangaroos in the Australian Capital Territory and New South Wales.

== Community outreach ==
=== Animals and domestic violence ===
In 2017 the ADO took part in forum looking at the impact of domestic violence on companion animals as part of the ACT Law Society's Law Week. The speaker representing the ADO, its director and volunteer lawyer Mike Rosalky, highlighted the laws that are currently in place in the Australian Capital Territory that protect victims of domestic violence and address animals abuse, and made the case that violence directed towards animals is often linked to domestic abuse.

=== Animal protection award ===
In 2017, the ADO awarded its inaugural Animal Protection Award, in recognition of significant work by an individual to protect animals within the community. The award went to Catherine Croatto, former inspector with the RSPCA ACT, who was credited with raising the number of animals brought into the RSPCA for protection and raising the number of animal cruelty prosecutions during her time with the organisation.
