= Animal Law Review =

Animal Law
- Discipline: Animal law
- Language: English

Publication details
- History: 1994–present
- Publisher: Joe Christensen, Inc. (United States)
- Frequency: Biannually

Standard abbreviations
- Bluebook: Animal L.
- ISO 4: Anim. Law Rev.

Indexing
- ISSN: 1088-8802

Links
- Journal homepage

Animal Law is a law review covering animal law published by students at Lewis & Clark Law School in Portland, Oregon. Publishing its first volume in 1994, it was the first law review to focus on animal law issues and is the best known journal in its field. It has featured articles by noted legal scholars such as Laurence H. Tribe and Cass R. Sunstein as well as experts such as Jane Goodall.

== Overview ==
Animal Law publishes two issues each year. The journal's objective is to educate readers about all sides of animal-related legal issues. The journal also publishes an annual Legislative Review, which covers developments in animal-related legislation at both the state and federal levels. Animal Law is edited entirely by students.

== Admissions ==
Members are selected in three ways. They can be admitted by virtue of their grades during their first year of law school. They can also be admitted by participating in an anonymous writing competition held by all three law reviews at Lewis & Clark Law School during the summer months. However, most members are admitted through a process in which students compete in a source-checking and editing competition at the end of their first semester of law school, then work as volunteer source checkers without academic credit during their second semester of law school. The students who earn top scores in the source-checking and editing competition are invited to source check the following semester and the students who excel during that semester are invited to join the law review as full members in their second year.
