= Anabaptist Association of Australia and New Zealand =

The Anabaptist Association of Australia and New Zealand (AAANZ) is a network of individuals from a variety of Christian denominations in Australia and New Zealand who share a common interest in the Anabaptist tradition.

In 1998 the body was incorporated with about 80 members. The association believes that the enduring legacy of the Anabaptists includes:

- baptism upon profession of faith
- church membership is voluntary and members are accountable to the Bible (read through the revelation of Jesus) and to each other
- commitment to the way of peace and other teachings of Jesus as a rule for life
- separation of church and state
- worshipping congregations which create authentic community and reach out through vision and service

== Annual meetings ==
- 1998
- 1999, Wollongong, New South Wales, Australia
- 2000
- 2001, Melbourne, Australia
- 2003, Sydney, Australia
- 2005, Canberra, Australia
- 2007, Perth, Australia
- 2009, Melbourne, Australia
- 2011, New Zealand
