= Brazilian Abolitionist Movement for Animal liberation =

The Brazilian Abolitionist Movement for Animal liberation is a social movement that protests the exploitation of nonhuman animals. This approach differs from animal welfare, which seeks to regulate this exploitation to make it more humane.

== Animal abolitionism ==
Tagore Trajano was elected the Institute's president in 2010. He stated, "the animal rights movement has helped to develop ambitious theories and challenge the Brazilian system. New authors have chosen this area to study and develop their research. This modest beginning has been helpful in furthering future debate. In the judiciary branch, the struggle has just begun."

According to Heron Santana, former president of the Animal Abolitionist Institute, those who claim that animal abolitionism is anti-human are incorrect. Instead, animal abolitionism extends the moral sphere to include animals. Tormenting or damaging animals through insensitive, inhumane, painful acts, therefore offends rather than confirms the principle of human dignity.

The social inefficacy of the principles and rules of article 225 of the Federal Constitution of Brazil occur because of the social obstacles that Lassalle called real factors of power, such as the animal exploration industry and the psychological blocks put forward by speciesism ideologues, that has soldier, until the moment, that the legal factors transform into real factors of power.

However it may be, it will be always possible to demand of the Third Power the compatibility of the inferior norms with the constitutional rules, because the real factors of the power come passing for significant changes, as the current environmental crisis and the recent scientific discovered have demonstrated.

The environmental crisis and factors as the global warming, the water pollution by the animal's exploration industry, the increase of the illnesses because of the meat consumption associates to the abolitionism and vegetarian movements amplify around the world are an evidence that the real factors are modifying.

=== More on the Animal Abolitionism Institute ===
A sign of progress of the issue in Brazil is the creation of the Animal Abolitionism Institute, occurred during the 1st Brazilian and Latin American Vegetarian Congress at Latin America Memorial. It's an institute that comes to addict to Brazilian Vegetarian Society in its efforts to abolish the animal slavery. Furthermore, it will help everybody that doesn't have legal support and philosophy's fundament in the elaboration of a process to defend the animal's interests.

This institute is the first of its kind in Brazil. It has between his creators some of the biggest thinkers and leaders of this movement in Brazil: Sônia Teresinha Felipe, Laerte Levai, Marly Winckler, Vania Rall, Irvênia Prada, Edna Cardozo Dias, Danielle Tetü Rodrigues, Luciano Rocha Santana, Nina Disconzi Rodrigues, Thiago Pires Oliveira, Paula Brügger, Vania Tuglio, and others.

The institute launched the Brazilian Animal Law Journal, the pioneer journal in Latin American. Its coordinators are Heron Gordilho, Luciano Santana and Tagore Trajano

Even Peter Singer, that faithful to Jeremy's Bentham positivism, refused to talk about animal rights, currently defends the extension of the human rights for the great primates, under the argument that we already have enough evidences that they are part of our sort.

As the Suíça vs Gavazza case has demonstrated, this can occur, as with slavery, without a constitutional amendment, therefore when article 225, §1º, VII of the Federal Constitution of Brazil ruled that the government and society must protect all animals, forbidden, in form of the law, practises that put in risk their ecological function, increase the extinction of species or submit them into cruel practises. Therefore, this norm must have an immediate effect.

== See also ==
- Argument from Marginal Cases
- Utilitarian Bioethics
- Utilitarianism
