= Cockatoo Island Mess Hall =

Mess Hall
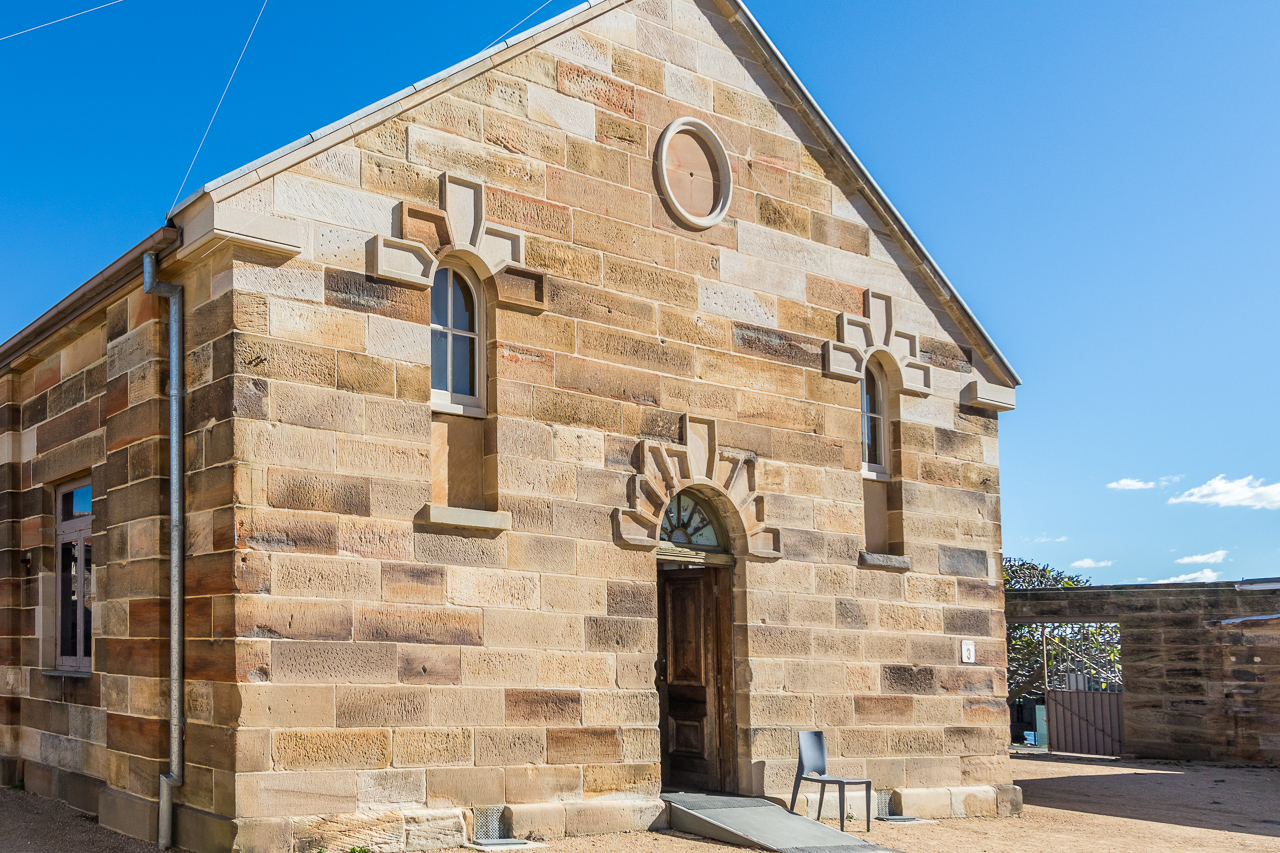

- Location within New South Wales
- 33.8481°S 151.1703°E
- Location: Cockatoo Island, New South Wales, Australia

Commonwealth Heritage List
- Official name: Mess Hall (former)
- Type: Listed place (Historic)
- Designated: 22 June 2004
- Reference no.: 105259

Mess Hall is a heritage-listed part of the Prison Barracks Precinct at Cockatoo Island, New South Wales, Australia. It is also known as Mess Hall (former). It was added to the Australian Commonwealth Heritage List on 22 June 2004.

== History ==
Cockatoo Island became a jail in 1839, following advice by New South Wales Governor George Gipps to the British Secretary of State for the Colonies that convicts would be sent to the island after the closure of the Norfolk Island convict establishment. The convict buildings (see also Prison Barracks Precinct, Convict Barracks Block, Military Guard Room and Biloela House) was built over several years, the buildings beginning to be occupied from October 1841. Quarrying of grain silos (at the Underground Grain Silos and Biloela House) was one of the early convict activities. In order to service Royal Navy ships, the Fitzroy Dock was built on the island and completed in 1857. Cockatoo became the major government dockyard in Australia.

In 1869 prisoners were transferred from the island to Darlinghurst, and the prison buildings became an industrial school for girls and a reformatory from 1871. The dockyard area was now separated from this institutional area on the top of the island by a fence. Following the departure of the females in 1888, prisoners were again sent to the island, and the jail function continued until about 1909. Meanwhile, the dockyard function expanded, and the Sutherland Dock was built in 1890. The NSW Public Works Department declared Cockatoo the state dockyard.

In 1913 Cockatoo became the Commonwealth Dockyard, and the island, both through ship-building and servicing, played an important role both in the development of the Royal Australian Navy and during the First World War. The former prison buildings were now used for office purposes. From 1933 the dockyard was leased from the Commonwealth by Cockatoo Docks and Engineering Co Ltd and the island played a very significant role during the Second World War. After the war the dockyard (now known as Vickers) continued, and submarine facilities were introduced. The dockyard closed in 1992, and there was some demolition. Sale of the island was proposed. The island is now vested in the Sydney Harbour Federation Trust.

The mess hall was built after Gother Kerr Mann was appointed engineer on the island (Commanding Royal Engineer Colonel George Barney had designed the earlier buildings). Construction took place between about 1847 and 1851. The mess hall was built west of the convict barracks and, with walling to the southwest and northwest, completed the enclosed nature of the convict precinct. Following the industrial school and later prison period, and after the Commonwealth took over, the mess hall was altered for office purposes and the windows were enlarged. The building though is generally intact.

The mess hall and the other convict-era buildings form the only remaining imperial-funded (as opposed to colonial) convict public works complex in New South Wales and form one of the most complete groups of convict structures in Australia.

== Description ==
Mess Hall is a part of Prison Barracks Precinct, Cockatoo Island, Sydney Harbour.

The mess hall is a finely detailed sandstone building, which was originally freestanding. With its fine gable and east end, it is a dominating feature in the precinct. On the ground floor, openings are square, while on the upper floor (above simple verandah supports on timber posts) are two attic windows with rounded heads. The gabled roof is clad with corrugated iron. The style is Old Colonial/Victorian Georgian.

=== Condition ===
The 1997 Conservation Management Plan noted that the roof of the central hall would require renewal, that some repairs had recently been made internally (but that more work was needed) and that the tie-rods in the roof trusses might need re-tightening. As at May 2001, the mess hall was substantially intact, and the stonework was in mainly good condition with the interior being generally satisfactory.

== Heritage listing ==
The Mess Hall was listed on the Australian Commonwealth Heritage List on 22 June 2004 having satisfied the following criteria.

Criterion A: Processes

The mess hall, completed c.1847-51, is historically highly significant for its association with early convict administration in the Australian colonies. It is also associated with the other phases of Cockatoo Island's history, as an industrial school for females and as a major shipyard.

Criterion B: Rarity

The building is part of a group of convict buildings which is the only remaining imperial convict public works complex in NSW, and is one of the most complete groups of convict structures in Australia.

Criterion D: Characteristic values

The mess hall is also an important example of the Colonial/Victorian Georgian style of convict structure of the period.

Criterion E: Aesthetic characteristics

The mess hall, with its fine detail and dominating gabled design in Old Colonial/Victorian Georgian style, has architectural significance and makes an important aesthetic contribution to the precinct.

Criterion F: Technical achievement

The mess hall, with its fine detail and dominating gabled design in Old Colonial/Victorian Georgian style, has architectural significance.
