= Cockatoo Island Military Guard Room =

Military Guard Room
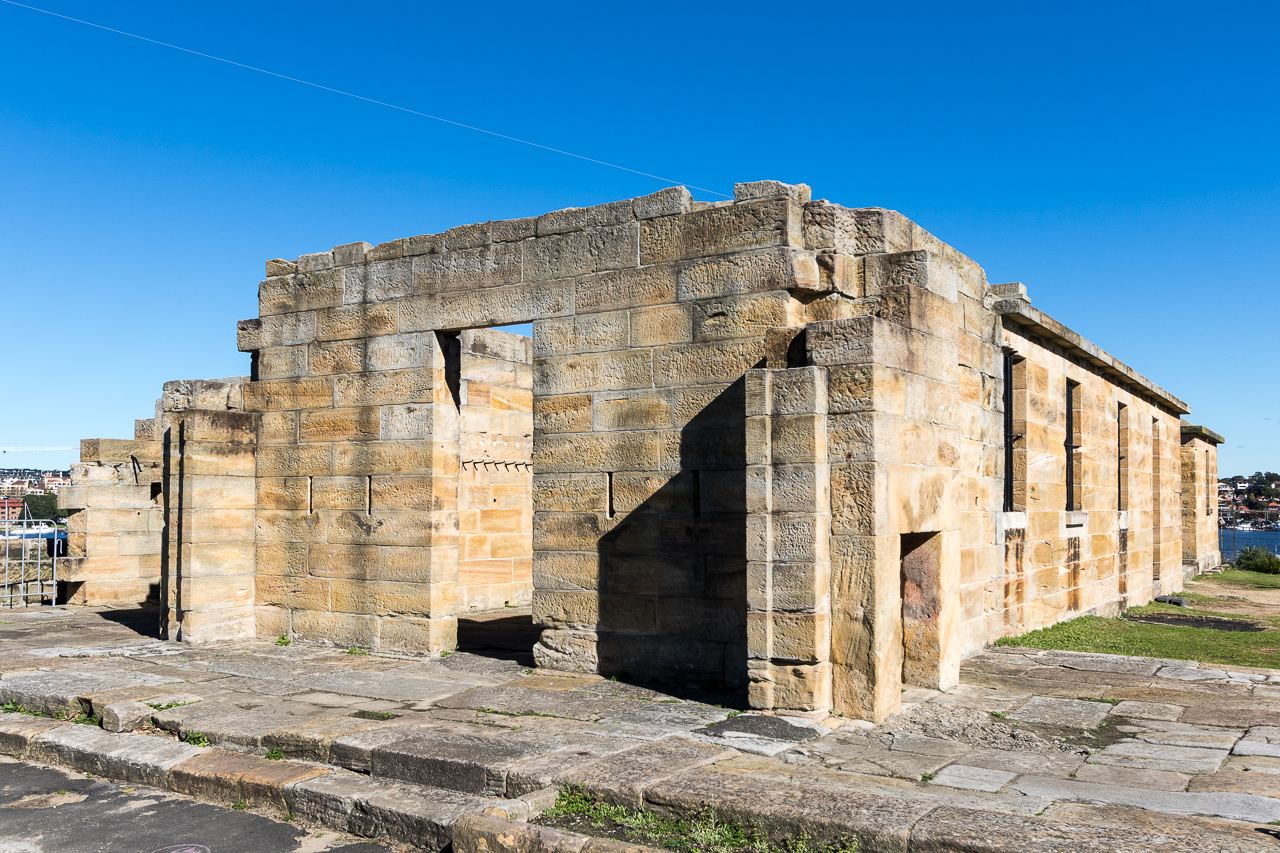

- Location within Sydney
- 33.8482°S 151.1700°E
- Location: Cockatoo Island, Sydney Harbour, New South Wales, Australia

Commonwealth Heritage List
- Official name: Military Guard Room
- Type: Listed place (Historic)
- Designated: 22 June 2004
- Reference no.: 105258

Military Guard Room is a heritage-listed military installation within the Prison Barracks Precinct, Cockatoo Island, Sydney Harbour, New South Wales, Australia. It was added to the Australian Commonwealth Heritage List on 22 June 2004.

== History ==
Cockatoo Island became a jail in 1839, following advice by New South Wales Governor George Gipps to the British Secretary of State for the Colonies that convicts would be sent to the island after the closure of the Norfolk Island convict establishment. The convict precinct (see also Cockatoo Island Prison Barracks Precinct, 1951, 1953 and 1859) was built over the next few years, the buildings beginning to be occupied from October 1841. Quarrying of grain silos (Biloela House and Underground Grain Silos) was one of the early convict tasks. In order to service Royal Navy ships, the Fitzroy Dock was built on the island and completed in 1857. Cockatoo became the major government dockyard in Australia.

In 1869 prisoners were transferred from the island to Darlinghurst, and the prison buildings became an industrial school for girls and a reformatory in 1871. The dockyard area was now separated from this institutional area on the top of the island by a fence. Following the departure of the girls in 1888, prisoners were again sent to the island, and the jail function continued until about 1909. Meanwhile, the dockyard function expanded, and the Sutherland Dock was built in 1890. The NSW Public Works Department declared Cockatoo the state dockyard.

After Federation, in 1913 Cockatoo became the Commonwealth Dockyard, and the island, both through shipbuilding and servicing, played an important role both in the development of the Royal Australian Navy and during the First World War. The former prison buildings were now used for office purposes. From 1933 the dockyard was leased from the Australian Government by Cockatoo Docks and Engineering Co Ltd and the island played a very significant role during the Second World War. After the war, now known as Vickers, the dockyard continued, and submarine facilities were introduced. The dockyard closed in 1992, and there was some demolition. Sale of the island was proposed. The island is now vested in the Sydney Harbour Federation Trust.

The military guard room, with detached kitchen and toilet, was erected in 1842, and a cell block (later demolished) was completed three years later. The buildings were designed by the Commanding Royal Engineer, Colonel George Barney, who played a notable role in the colony. During the female institution phase, the guard room was used as a sewing room, then as a store and office. After the females' departure, the room became offices and accommodation for the resident engineer, before a new wing was added and the building reverted to prison purposes. After Commonwealth assumption of control, the room was used as a residence by the 1920s. After the Second World War the buildings' roofs were removed; stone was also cannibalised for use elsewhere on the island. In 1980 parts of the room were removed and the walls were topped with cement render.

The guard room and the other convict-era buildings form the only remaining imperial-funded (as opposed to colonial) convict public works complex in New South Wales and form one of the most complete groups of convict structures in Australia.

== Description ==
Military Guard Room is a part of the Prison Barracks Precinct, Cockatoo Island, Sydney Harbour.

The guard room is single storey, rectangular, and built of sandstone blocks, with a separate kitchen. The style is Old Colonial Georgian. Both buildings are roofless. Window and door openings are rectangular. The walls finish at the roof line with stone slab eaves. Inside, the guardroom features iron wall-rods which would have supported timber boards upon which rifles were laid. Underneath are iron hat-pegs. There is also a reconstructed stone chimney at the south-west end. The guard room and the kitchen have stone slab floors.

=== Condition ===
The 1997 Conservation Management Plan noted that the stonework was generally in good condition, while there was some corrosion to the ironwork. As at May 2001, both buildings were roofless and the walls had varying levels of intactness. There was some weed and other vegetation growth.

== Heritage listing ==
Military Guard Room was listed on the Australian Commonwealth Heritage List on 22 June 2004 having satisfied the following criteria.

Criterion A: Processes

The military guard room (and detached kitchen), completed in 1842, is historically highly significant for its association with early convict administration in the Australian colonies. It is also associated with the other phases of Cockatoo Island's history, as an industrial school for females and as a major shipyard.

Criterion B: Rarity

The building is the only remaining imperial convict public works complex in NSW, and is one of the most complete groups of convict structures in Australia. The building is a rare and important example of a guard house of the period, still exhibiting features directly related to its use.

Criterion D: Characteristic values

The building is part of a group of convict buildings which is the only remaining imperial convict public works complex in NSW, and is one of the most complete groups of convict structures in Australia. As such, the building is also a rare and important example of a guard house of the period, still exhibiting features directly related to its use.

Criterion H: Significant people

The building was designed by Colonel George Barney, who as Commanding Royal Engineer played a notable role in the colony.
