= Cockatoo Island Convict Barracks Block =

Convict Barracks Block
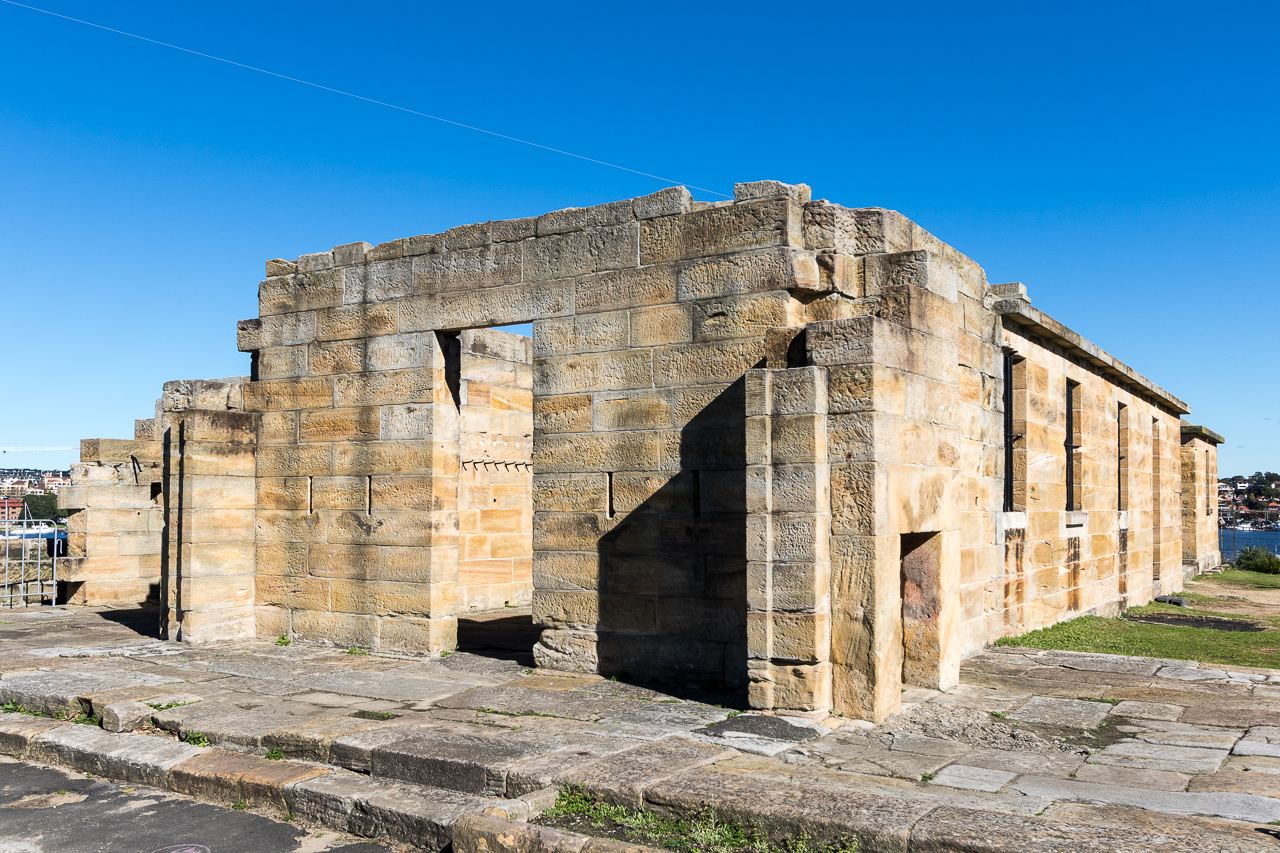
- Cockatoo Island barracks

- Location within Sydney
- 33.8481°S 151.1706°E
- Location: Cockatoo Island, Sydney Harbour, New South Wales, Australia

Commonwealth Heritage List
- Official name: Barracks Block
- Type: Listed place (Historic)
- Designated: 22 June 2004
- Reference no.: 105257

Convict Barracks Block is a heritage-listed convict barracks within the Prison Barracks Precinct, Cockatoo Island, Sydney Harbour, New South Wales, Australia. It was added to the Australian Commonwealth Heritage List on 22 June 2004.

== History ==
Cockatoo Island became a jail in 1839, following advice by New South Wales Governor George Gipps to the British Secretary of State for the Colonies that convicts would be sent to the island after the closure of the Norfolk Island convict establishment. The Prison Barracks Precinct was built over the next few years, the buildings being able to be occupied from October 1841. Quarrying of grain silos at Biloela House and the Underground Grain Silos was one of the early convict tasks. In order to service Royal Navy ships, the Fitzroy Dock was built on the island and completed in 1857. Cockatoo became the major government dockyard in Australia.

In 1869 prisoners were transferred from the island to Darlinghurst, and the prison buildings became an industrial school for girls and a reformatory in 1871. The dockyard area was now separated from the institution by a fence. Following the departure of the girls in 1888, prisoners were again sent to the island, and the jail function continued until about 1909. Meanwhile, the dockyard function expanded, and the Sutherland Dock was built in 1890. The New South Wales Public Works Department declared Cockatoo the state dockyard.

After Federation, in 1913 Cockatoo became the Commonwealth Dockyard, and the island, both through shipbuilding and servicing, played an important role both in the development of the Royal Australian Navy and during the First World War. The former prison buildings were now used for office purposes. From 1933 the dockyard was leased from the Australian Government by Cockatoo Docks and Engineering Co Ltd and the island played a very significant role during the Second World War. After the war, now known as Vickers, the dockyard continued, and submarine facilities were introduced. The dockyard closed in 1992, and there was some demolition. Sale of the island was proposed. The island is now vested in the Sydney Harbour Federation Trust.

The convict barracks block was erected c.1839-42. It was designed by the Commanding Royal Engineer Colonel George Barney, who played a notable role in the colony. The building included hospital wards, a cookhouse and mess shed. Due to overcrowding a second storey was proposed in 1849, but was not proceeded with. Various extensions were added (a latrine and office block formed infill when built later). The barracks was later used by the Industrial School, and by prisoners again in 1888. Following the Commonwealth's takeover, the building was used as offices.

The barracks and the other convict-era buildings form the only remaining imperial-funded (as opposed to colonial-funded) convict public works complex in NSW and form one of the most complete groups of convict structures in Australia.

== Description ==
The Convict Barracks Block is a part of Prison Barracks Precinct, Cockatoo Island, Sydney Harbour.

The barracks is a single storey sandstone building, built in a rare U-shape, and with an enclosed court. The building includes former hospital wards, a cookhouse and mess shed, plus other later additions. The roof (variously corrugated iron, fibro and concrete) is pitched and the building has a verandah. During the Second World War two wards in the building were converted to air raid shelters. Various other modifications were made at other times. The style is Old Colonial Georgian.

=== Condition ===
The barracks has been modified for different uses at different times during its history. During the Second World War particularly destructive alterations were made. Some inappropriate materials remain, though in the 1990s a new roof was fitted, and other repairs and painting work was completed. Some decay of the stonework was noted in the 1997 Conservation Management Plan.

== Heritage listing ==
The Convict Barracks Block was listed on the Australian Commonwealth Heritage List on 22 June 2004 having satisfied the following criteria.

Criterion A: Processes

The convict barracks block, completed in the early 1840s, is historically highly significant for its association with early convict administration in the Australian colonies. It is also associated with the other phases of Cockatoo Island's history, as an industrial school and as a major shipyard.

Criterion B: Rarity

The block is part of a group of convict buildings which is the only remaining imperial convict public works complex in NSW, and is important as a rare example of a convict barracks block of the period.

Criterion D: Characteristic values

The block is part of one of the most complete groups of convict structures in Australia and is important as a rare example of a convict barracks block of the period.

Criterion H: Significant people

The block was designed by Colonel George Barney, who as Commanding Royal Engineer played a notable role in the colony.
