= Macquarie Lighthouse =

Lighthouse in New South Wales, Australia

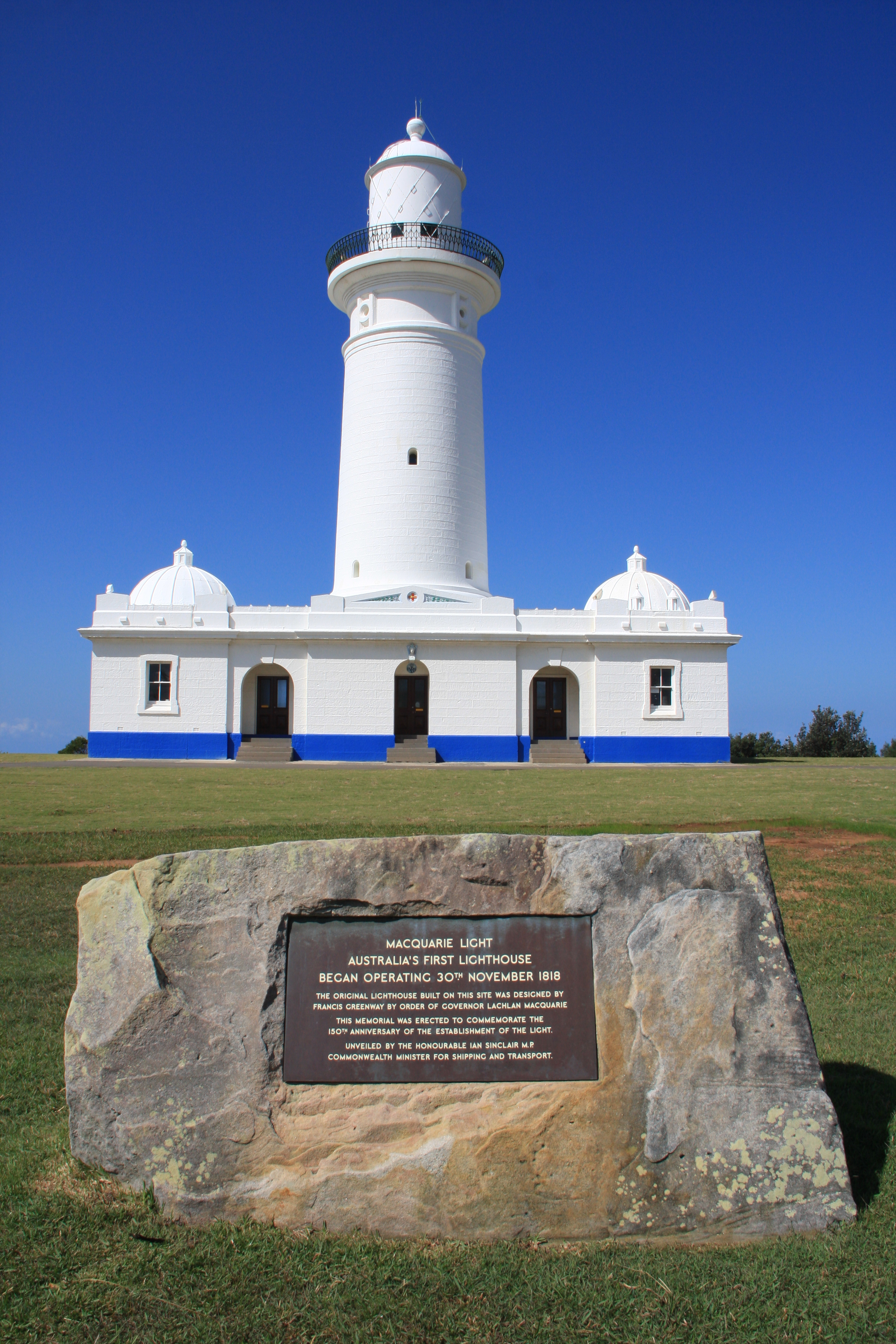
- Macquarie Lighthouse, Dunbar Head
- Location: Vaucluse, Sydney, New South Wales, Australia
- Coordinates: 33°51′14.2″S 151°17′06.6″E

Tower
- Constructed: 1818 (first)
- Construction: Sandstone tower
- Automated: 1976
- Height: 26 metres (85 ft)
- Shape: Cylindrical tower with balcony and lantern atop service building
- Markings: White tower and lantern
- Operator: Australian Maritime Safety Authority (light); Sydney Harbour Federation Trust (site)
- Heritage: Heritage Act — State Heritage Register, Local Environmental Plan, listed on the Commonwealth Heritage List

Light
- First lit: 1883 (current)
- Focal height: 105 metres (344 ft)
- Lens: 1st order sixteen sided Fresnel lens (1883), 1st order bivalve Fresnel lens (1933)
- Intensity: 800,000 candela
- Range: 25 nautical miles (46 km; 29 mi)
- Characteristic: Fl (2) W 10s.

Commonwealth Heritage List
- Official name: Macquarie Lighthouse Group, Old South Head Rd, Vaucluse, NSW, Australia; Macquarie Lighthouse; Macquarie Lighthouse Surrounding Wall
- Type: Listed place
- Designated: 22 June 2004
- Reference no.: 105365; 105366; 105412
- Class: Historic
- Place File No.: 1/12/041/0039

New South Wales Heritage Register
- Official name: Macquarie Lighthouse Site
- Type: State heritage (built)
- Designated: 2 April 1999
- Reference no.: 0677
- Type: Lighthouse Tower
- Category: Transport – Water

The Macquarie Lighthouse, also known as South Head Upper Light, is the first, and is the longest serving, lighthouse site in Australia. It is located on Dunbar Head, on Old South Head Road, Vaucluse in the Municipality of Woollahra local government area of New South Wales, Australia. The lighthouse is situated approximately 2 kilometres (1 mi) south of South Head near the entrance to Sydney Harbour. There has been a navigational aid in this vicinity since 1791 and a lighthouse near the present site since 1818. The current heritage-listed lighthouse was completed in 1883. The lighthouse and associated buildings were designed by James Barnet and built from 1881 to 1883.

The lighthouse is fully operational and is under the control of the Australian Maritime Safety Authority. The grounds are managed by the Sydney Harbour Federation Trust.

The lighthouse is featured on the coat of arms of Macquarie University. A simplified line drawing of the lighthouse forms the logo of Woollahra Council in which local government the lighthouse is located.

The lighthouse and associated site were added to the New South Wales State Heritage Register on 2 April 1999 and to the Commonwealth Heritage List on 22 June 2004.

== History ==
=== Indigenous heritage ===
In February 2006 the Sydney Harbour Federation Trust commissioned the Australian Museum Business Services to carry out an Archaeological Survey of the Macquarie Lightstation. This was undertaken in conjunction with the La Perouse Aboriginal Land Council. The survey found no Aboriginal sites or objects on the surface and that the previous disturbance to the site made it highly unlikely that any Aboriginal material was pre-Greenway wall is likely to have come from an Aboriginal midden and appears to contain at least one possible artefact within it. It recommends that no further survey work is necessary or warranted. However, due to the shell midden material it recommends recording the wall as an Aboriginal site. It also recommended that any work to the east of the Francis Greenway wall that will result in the exposure of the sandstone platforms will require monitoring and detailed recording conducted by a qualified archaeologist.

=== European settlement ===
The Macquarie Lightstation Precinct and surrounding lands were dedicated to navigational and communication activities from the very early years of the colony and remarkably continue to be associated with these uses today. As early as 1788, South Head was being used as a look-out point for boats entering and leaving the harbour. Prior to 1816 South Head was the site for a manned flagstaff, a fire beacon, a navigation column and a signal station. In 1790, Captain Arthur Phillip directed a party of seamen from the Sirius to erect a flagstaff "on a high bluff...at the entrance to the harbour..." in order to communicate the arrival of ships into the harbour back to the colony at Sydney Cove. The first signal from here was displayed in February of that year. It is believed that the present Signal Station is the site of the 1790 flagstaff. Later that year, Phillip also commanded that a column be erected near the flagstaff. It should be "... of a height sufficient to be seen from some distance at sea, and the stonemasons were sent down to quarry stone upon the spot for the building..." The column was erected on a raised base measuring 16 square feet (1.5 m^{2}) and had its own base of 4 square feet (0.37 m^{2}). The signalling activities at South Head were now two-fold, communicating news about the arrival of ships to the colony at Sydney Cove via semaphore, and informing ships of the location of the entrance to Port Jackson. By the end of 1790 the site was known as the "Look-out Post" and there were huts and vegetable gardens adjacent to the flagstaff for the eleven men stationed there.

The column was destroyed in September 1792 by a major storm. It was reportedly re-erected, using bricks from Bennelong's disused hut on Bennelong Point, as there were not enough bricks available from the kilns in the Brickfields. This was followed, in 1793, by a tripod mounted iron basket, which originally burned wood, and later coal. During this period, access to the site was via a walking track, which was approximately in the same location as the present Old South Head Road. In 1803 surgeon John Harris offered to construct a road 4.6 metres (15 ft) wide for A£100. By 1811 the thirteen kilometres (eight miles) of road and eleven bridges of Old South Head Road was completed. It terminated at the Signal Station, with a walking track leading down to Watsons Bay.

=== The first Macquarie Lighthouse (1816–1878) ===
Following the end of the Napoleonic war in 1815, many more convicts were sent to New South Wales, with over 1000 arriving in 1818. The impending arrival of ships transporting convicts and an increase in the volume of shipping led to the commencement of a series of building projects in Sydney. Governor Macquarie gave instructions that a lighthouse, the first in Australia, be constructed at the entrance to Port Jackson on South Head. Francis Greenway was appointed as architect and Captain John Gill as supervisor. Numerous people criticised the appropriateness of the site because of its distance 2.4 kilometres (1.5 mi) from the opening into Port Jackson between Sydney Heads. Greenway suggested North Head as an appropriate location, but this was dismissed by Governor Macquarie as being too remote. The foundation stone was laid on 11 July 1816.

The lighthouse sat in an area compounded by four stone retaining walls with originally two corner lodges intended for the "keepers of the Signals". The construction of the tower was probably one of the most difficult constructions undertaken in the colony to date. The colony had a shortage of quality building materials and skilled labour which despite the skills of Greenway and Gill, proved to make the construction very difficult. In addition, Greenway and Gill often disagreed on best methods of construction leading to design and engineering compromises. The lighthouse tower was essentially completed by December 1817 when Macquarie wrote to Lord Bathurst, the British Secretary of State to inform him of the "Very Elegant and Strong Stone Tower and Light House" erected at South Head. At this time the lantern was yet to be completed as they were waiting for the arrival of the plate glass from England. Bathurst responded favourably to Macquarie despite the fact that work on the lighthouse had commenced without obtaining official approval from Britain On 16 December 1817, the Governor and Mrs Macquarie and a party of their friends went to inspect the tower. On the same day, before breakfast, Francis Greenway received his emancipation papers at the Lighthouse.

The lighthouse was operational permanently from 1818 and was under the supervision of the former quartermaster for the first Fleet and retired harbourmaster, Robert Watson. He had previously served as quartermaster on the Sirius, worked at Norfolk Island and had been Harbour Master at Port Jackson.

Shortcomings in the construction of the tower became evident early on. The soft sandstone proved short-lived, and even as early as 1823 it started crumbling, and large steel bands were placed to keep the structure together. By 1822 it was deemed necessary to carry out emergency structural repairs as some stones had fallen from the arches during that year. This work included the reconstruction of the supporting arches, the repointing of stones, and the introduction of a large iron hoop to support the base of the tower. Further repairs were undertaken in 1830 and a verandah was added on the western face of the building. In 1836 new quarters were built in the south-west corner of the site for the Head Keeper. In 1866 further structural repairs were required to the lighthouse including the addition of more iron straps around the tower. The tower was now distinctly dilapidated and in 1873 it was agreed that the light cast by the Macquarie Tower was not sufficiently strong for its important location, and that new, more powerful lighting technology should be used. However, the lantern on the Macquarie Tower was too small to accommodate the new apparatus. By 1878 the NSW Government decided a new tower was needed. The construction of the new tower started in 1880, just 4 metres (13 ft) away from the original structure. It was officially lit in 1883.

In 1857 the Dunbar was wrecked on South Head, and the Catherine Adams on North Head. These tragedies highlighted the need to more clearly define the entry to the harbour. The wreck of the Dunbar in particular showed the deficiencies of the Macquarie Light, as it appeared that The Gap may have been mistaken for the harbour entry. As a consequence the Hornby light was constructed at the extreme northerly end of South Head in 1858. In 1878, approval was given to replace the Greenway-built tower with a new tower.

=== The Barnet Lighthouse (1878–1937) ===
James Barnet was the architect responsible for the project and his design was clearly based on Greenway's original, a mark of the respect held for Greenway's work. Although the building is seen as a replica of Greenway's design, Barnet incorporated other changes in the appearance of the building, particularly in the proportions of the elements, and, notably, in the larger domes and ventilators over the side wings and the projecting gallery of bluestone at the top of the tower. The light commenced operation in 1883 and had a range of twenty five nautical miles. The technology used in this lighthouse (it was one of the first electrically powered lighthouses in the world) was such that a higher level of expertise in the maintenance was required and hence a larger number of staff. This led to the construction in 1881 of two semidetached cottages for the assistants to the Head Keeper. In 1885 new quarters were built for the Engineer and his assistant.

The crown and the lantern room were larger so a larger apparatus can be accommodated. Also added was a black gunmetal railing, which was to become one of Barnet's hallmarks. The original lens was a Chance Brothers 2-metre (6 ft 7 in), sixteen sided, dioptric, holophotal, Fresnel lens, with a characteristic of one eight-second white flash every minute (L Fl W. 60s), visible for 25 nautical miles (46 km; 29 mi). The original light source used on clear weather was a gas burner. On bad weather an electric arc lamp was used, electricity being supplied by a de Méritens generators driven by a Crossley coal gas engine. On especially bad weather a second generator was also operated, resulting in a 6,000,000 cd light, the world's most powerful at the time. One of the generators, the switchboard and one arc lamp still exist, owned by the Powerhouse Museum. The generator and the switchboard are on display at the lighthouse. The lantern of the old lighthouse was immediately removed, and the structure was demolished several years later. In 1912 the apparatus was converted to a vaporised kerosene mantle, to lower costs. In 1933 the light returned to use electricity, as the tower was connected to mains electricity. The current first order bivalve Fresnel lens was installed at that time. In 1976 the Macquarie Lighthouse was fully automated, the last lightstation staff left the site in 1989. The grounds were transferred to the management of the Sydney Harbour Federation Trust in 2001.

The Head Keeper's Quarters were modified in 1887 after complaints about the standard of accommodation. The western wing of this building was added in 1899. Despite having once been thought to be the "most efficient light in the world", by 1909 it was deemed to be obsolete, unable to cope with the heavy winter fogs. In 1912, following a call to standardise all lighthouses, the electric light at the Macquarie Lighthouse was replaced with a kerosene system. The new fuel was cheaper to run and required just two men to operate. On 1 July 1915 all the ocean lighthouses were transferred to the control of the Commonwealth Lighthouse Service. The two remaining cottages on the site include the head keeper's cottage built c. 1840 on the south side and the assistant lighthouse keepers' semi-detached cottages built in 1881 on the north side (converted into one cottage c. 1991). The former is now the oldest intact freestanding lightkeeper's quarters in Australia. Both these cottages are on 125-year Commonwealth leases to end between 2116 & 2119. A third cottage for the engineer and assistants built in 1885 was demolished in 1970 to make way for four townhouses still present on the site.

=== World War II to present (1939–2020) ===
The fortifications at South Head were upgraded during World War II. At the lightstation, this included the construction of an observation post east of the lighthouse and a nearby shaft and tunnel, the location of which has since been obscured. After the war there was a rapid development in other navigational systems, and the lighthouse became simply one of a number of aids which enabled the mariner to determine his exact position. The importance of manned lighthouses such as Macquarie also decreased with the advent of integrated air systems for surveillance, search and rescue.

By 1965 the existing garage to the east of the Head Keeper's Quarters had been constructed and in 1970 the 1885 Barnet-designed Engineer and Assistant's Quarters were demolished to make way for the existing row of four townhouses. These originally accommodated the Workshop Supervisor and the Mechanics (Maritime Aids). The road access on the southern side of the site was also constructed during this time. The station was fully automated in 1976 but the residences remained occupied by staff. In 1980 the Commonwealth Department of Construction carried out a series of works to return the Head Keeper's Quarters to its 1899 form in anticipation of it opening as a museum; however the decision to set up a museum was never taken. In 1989 all staff associated with the Commonwealth Department of Shipping and Transport left the site. The Commonwealth leased the Assistant Keepers' Quarters in 1991 and the Head Keeper's Quarters in 1994 as private residences, both for 125 years. The townhouses are now leased as residences on a short-term basis and the lighthouse is leased to Australian Maritime Safety Authority (AMSA). In 2004, the head keeper's cottage (on the south side) was offered for sale at a price of A$1.95 million.

== Description ==
=== Lighthouse ===
The Lighthouse is a circular tower approximately five metres (sixteen feet) in diameter with walls of sandstone blocks varying from 0.9 to 1.2 metres (2 ft 11 in to 3 ft 11 in) thick. The tower is founded on spread sandstone footings approximately 1.8 metres (5 ft 11 in) wide bearing on the rock. Two wings formerly containing generating equipment and a workshop are located on either side of the square base of the tower. These are constructed in solid sandstone blocks founded in the sandstone. Ground floor levels are concrete, over approximately one metre of graded packed rock. There are four levels of internal floors up to the lantern base level. Circular stairs and floor plate material are in cast iron while beams supporting the floors are rolled steel joists. The gallery level around the lantern is of Melbourne bluestone and the railing is made of gunmetal. Roof domes over the ancillary wings are timber structures clad with lead sheeting.

=== Head Keeper's Cottage (1818, 1830s) ===
Part of the cottage is/was the sandstone pavilion designed by Francis Greenway along with the adjacent original lighthouse, in 1818. This pavilion was later incorporated into the cottage, which was further extended in the 1830s.

=== Assistant Keeper's Quarters/Cottage (1881) ===
Large sandstone home, built in 1881 to a design by Colonial Architect James Barnet. Extensively restored and renovated by Clive Lucas, Stapleton & Partners. Extensive grounds. Built in 1881.

=== Stone Retaining Walls and other buildings ===
Other structures on the site include stone retaining wall and stone walls to former quarters.

=== Modifications and dates ===
- 1790, Captain Phillip directed erection of a flagstaff "on a high bluff...at the entrance to the harbour..." in order to communicate the arrival of ships into Sydney Cove. The first signal from here was displayed in February of that year. It is believed that the present Signal Station is the site of the 1790 flagstaff.
- Later 1790, Phillip commanded a column be erected near the flagstaff "... of a height sufficient to be seen from some distance at sea, and stonemasons were sent to quarry stone upon the spot for it..." The column was on a raised base measuring 16-foot square and had its own base of 4-foot square. The column was destroyed in 9/1792 by a storm. It was reportedly re-erected using bricks from Bennelong's disused hut on Bennelong Point. During this period, access was via walking track approximately in the same location as the present Old South Head Road.
- 1803 surgeon John Harris offered to construct a road 15 feet wide for 100 pounds. By 1811 the eight miles of road and 11 bridges of Old South Head Road was completed ending at the Signal Station with a walking track down to Watsons Bay.
- 1816 a manned flagstaff, fire beacon, navigation column and a signal station.
- 1883 new lighthouse built to replace original 1816 lighthouse
- 2011 Lighthouse Keeper's Cottage (for lease – advertisement notes): large chef's kitchen, butler's kitchen, dining deck in courtyardand barbeque, gymnasium, spa, home office, multiple gas fireplaces, good storage, security systems, 3 car garage.

== Heritage listing ==
Macquarie Lighthouse Site was listed on the New South Wales State Heritage Register on 2 April 1999. It was added to the Commonwealth Heritage List on 4 September 2008 with the following statement of significance:

The Macquarie Lighthouse site is of State significance as the location of the longest continuously operating site of a navigational beacon in Australia since 1794 and the site of the first lighthouse to be built in Australia in 1818. The Macquarie Lighthouse is an important Australian historic landmark containing the rare remains of the early Palladian-inspired design by Francis Greenway and Governor Lachlan Macquarie, a rare replica of the original Greenway lighthouse, the oldest lighthouse keeper's quarters in Australia, and a substantial example of a mid-Victorian period NSW lightstation designed by James Barnet.

— Commonwealth Heritage List

== Gallery ==
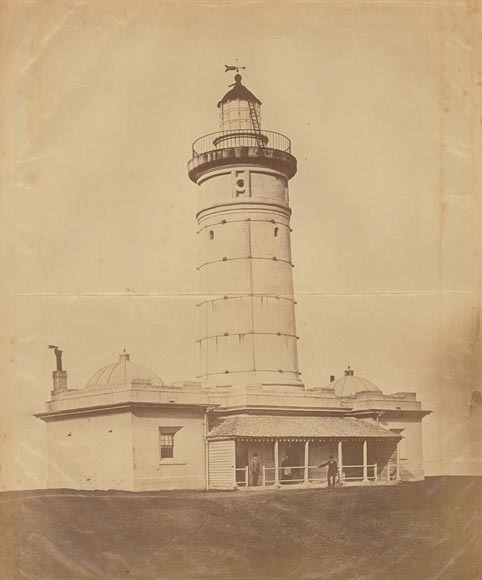
The first Macquarie Lighthouse, built 1816–18 photograph taken in the 1870s; from the 'Papers of James Barnet'

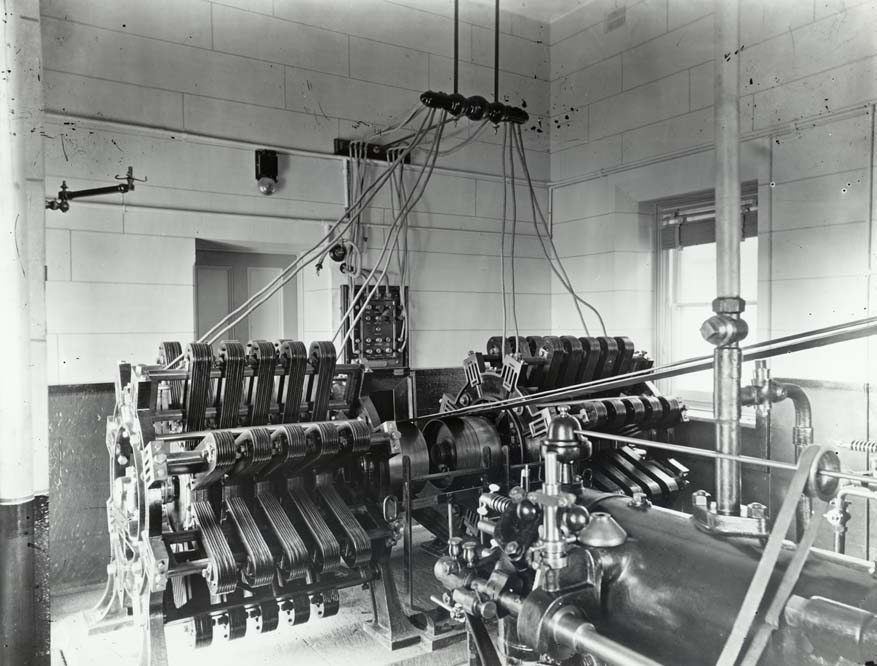
De Meritens generators at the Macquarie Lighthouse engine room

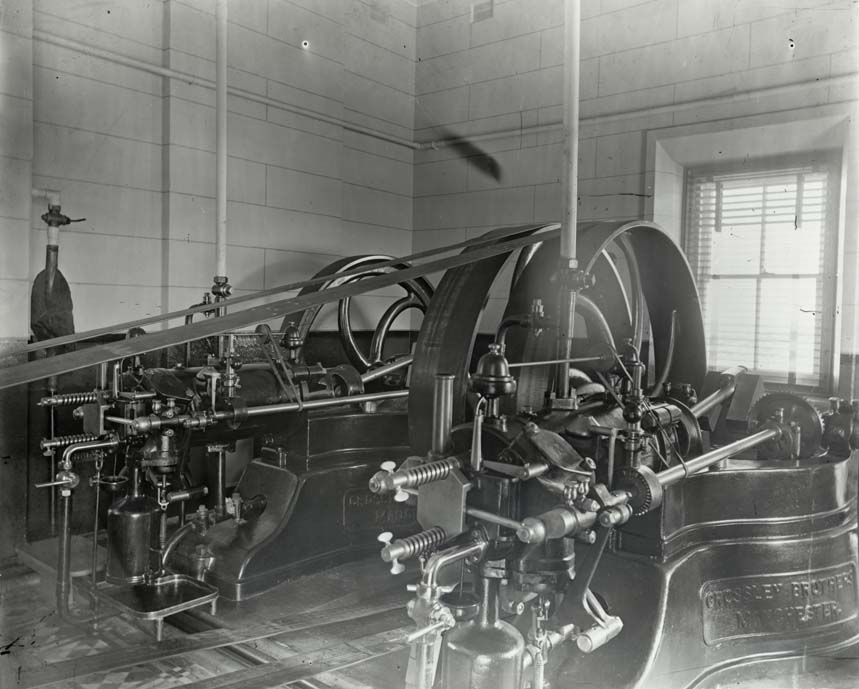
Crossley coal gas engine at the Macquarie Lighthouse engine room

== See also ==
- List of lighthouses in Australia
