= Underground Grain Silos =

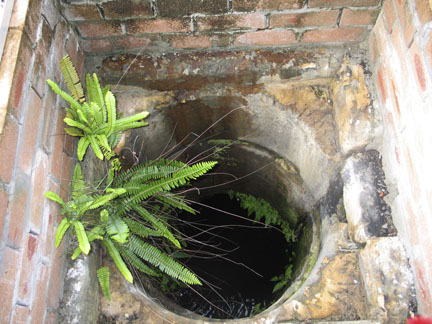
- Mouth of one of the silos, 2006

- Location within Sydney
- 33.8478°S 151.1726°E
- Location: Cockatoo Island, Sydney Harbour, New South Wales, Australia

Commonwealth Heritage List
- Official name: Underground Grain Silos
- Type: Listed place (Historic)
- Designated: 22 June 2004
- Reference no.: 105264

The Underground Grain Silos are heritage-listed silos at Cockatoo Island, Sydney Harbour, New South Wales, Australia. It was added to the Australian Commonwealth Heritage List on 22 June 2004.

== History ==
Cockatoo Island became a gaol in 1839, following advice by NSW Governor George Gipps to the British Secretary of State for the Colonies that convicts would be sent to the island after the closure of the Norfolk Island convict establishment. The convict precinct (Prison Barracks Precinct) was built over several years. Quarrying of grain silos (see below, and also Biloela House) was one of the early convict activities. In order to service Royal Navy ships, the Fitzroy Dock was built on the island and completed in 1857. Cockatoo Island Dockyard became the major government dockyard in Australia.

In 1869 prisoners were transferred from the island to Darlinghurst, and the prison buildings became an industrial school for girls and a reformatory in 1871. The dockyard area was now separated from this institutional area on the top of the island by a fence. Following the departure of the females in 1888, prisoners were again sent to the island, and the gaol function continued until about 1909. Meanwhile, the dockyard function expanded, and the Sutherland Dock was built in 1890. The New South Wales Public Works Department declared Cockatoo the state dockyard.

Following Federation, in 1913 Cockatoo became the Commonwealth Dockyard, and the island, both through ship-building and servicing, played an important role both in the development of the Royal Australian Navy and during the First World War. The former prison buildings were now used for offices. From 1933 the dockyard was leased from the Australian Government by the Cockatoo Docks & Engineering Company and the island played a very significant role during the Second World War. After the war the dockyard (now known as Vickers) continued, and submarine facilities were introduced. The dockyard closed in 1992, and some demolition took place. The sale of the island was proposed. The island is now vested in the Sydney Harbour Federation Trust.

Due to the uncertain grain supplies available in the early colony of NSW, Governor Gipps in 1839 decided to embark on a silo construction program on Cockatoo Island. In this way grain could be stored for future use. The silos, designed by Commanding Royal Engineer Colonel George Barney (who played a significant role in the colony), were excavated into the island's sandstone rock by convict work gangs and, being well sealed, the silos were weevil-free. By November 1840 20,000 bushels of wheat were stored in the completed silos, and other silos were underway. Gipps hoped to increase storage up to 100,000 bushels if the low price of wheat then prevailing continued. Over twenty silos were eventually quarried into the sandstone of Cockatoo. However, as grain storage (and hence regulation of the market) was at odds with Britain's subsequent free market policies, Gipps was instructed to sell the grain. Later, either in the 1870s or the early 1880s, the silos were re-used for water storage purposes. Some of the silos were subsequently destroyed by building construction. The surviving silos on the Island are believed to be the only group of convict-cut rock silos in the nation. The other major group of convict-constructed underground silos are located on Norfolk Island, but these are cut into the earth.

== Description ==
The Underground Grain Silos are about 65m south-east of Biloela and immediately between the cottage marked Robb (Clerk of Petty Sessions Cottage) and the cliff, Cockatoo Island, Sydney Harbour.

This group of silos, sited on the crown of the Island, consists of three complete and two half (the half ones were "halved" by excavation of the cliff face during the Second World War). The perfectly symmetrical silos are bottle-shaped, and an incision on the surface of the rock indicates the diameter of the silo below ground. The mouth is square and provided with a lip to exclude water; there is also a metal plate over the mouth. The "bottle" is circular in plan and approaching 5.5 metres in diameter. The silos held from 3000 to 5000 bushels of grain each. Visible evidence of thirteen silos remains on the island (the other silos are near Biloela House).

=== Condition ===
As at May 2001, the intact silos are understood to be in good condition.

== Heritage listing ==
The Underground Grain Silos were listed on the Australian Commonwealth Heritage List on 22 June 2004 having satisfied the following criteria.

Criterion A: Processes

Excavated during 1839-40, the grain silos are historically highly significant for their direct association with the convict era in New South Wales. They are also associated, as water storage facilities, with the other phases of Cockatoo Island's history, when the island was used as an industrial school and as a major government shipyard. Further, the silos reflect aspects of food supply and government administration in the early years of the colony.

Criterion B: Rarity

The silos on the island are believed to be the only major group of convict-cut rock silos in Australia.

Criterion F: Technical achievement

The silos are finely excavated and reflect a high degree of stonemasonry skills on the part of their builders.

Criterion H: Significant people

The silos also have significance for their association with Colonel George Barney, who played a notable engineering role in colonial NSW for a number of years.
