= Biloela House =

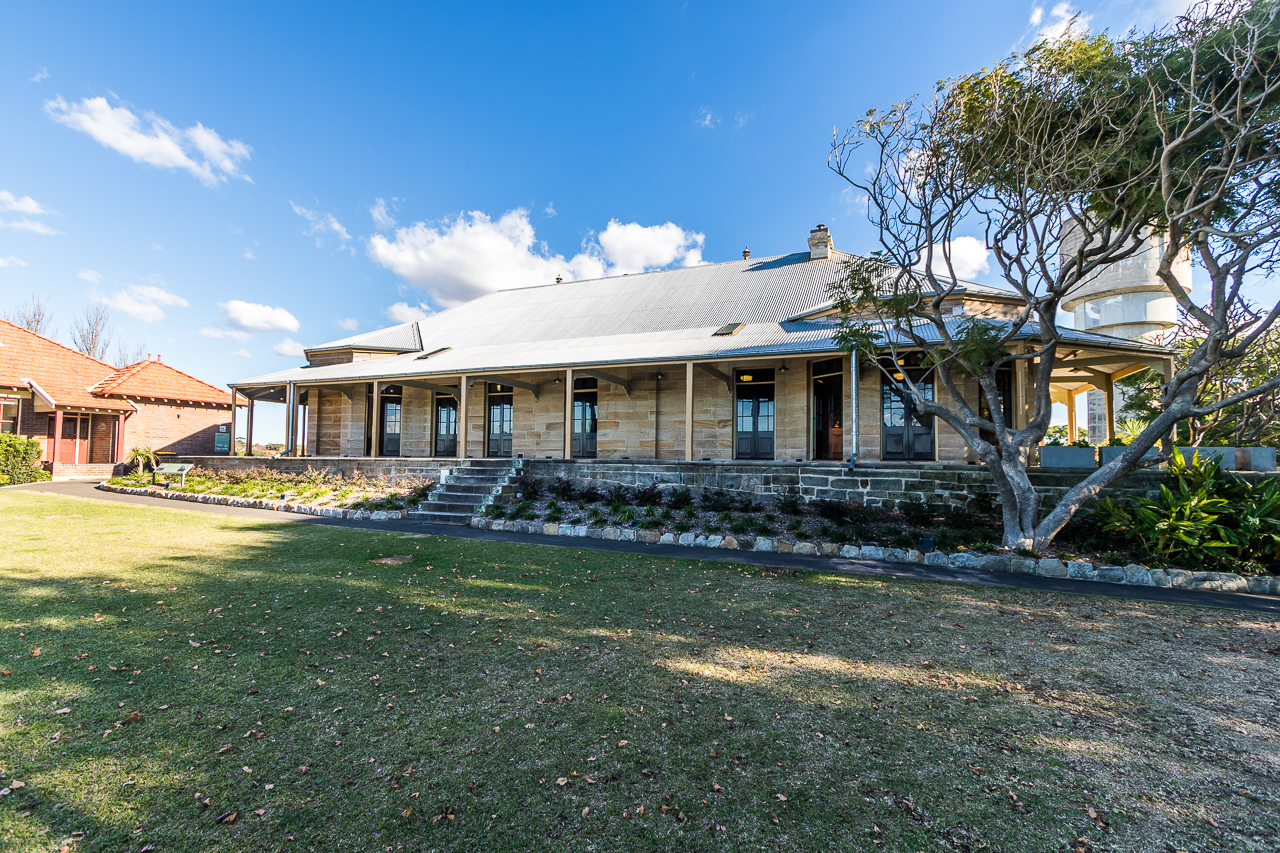

- Location within Sydney
- 33.8474°S 151.1722°E
- Location: Cockatoo Island, New South Wales, Australia

Commonwealth Heritage List
- Official name: Biloela Group
- Type: Listed place (Historic)
- Designated: 22 June 2004
- Reference no.: 105263

Biloela House is a house at the centre of a heritage-listed historic precinct on Cockatoo Island, Sydney Harbour, New South Wales, Australia. It was added to the Australian Commonwealth Heritage List on 22 June 2004.

== History ==
Cockatoo Island became a prison in 1839, following advice by NSW Governor George Gipps to the British Secretary of State for the Colonies that convicts would be sent to the island after the closure of the Norfolk Island convict establishment. The Prison Barracks Precinct was built over several years. Quarrying of grain silos (see also Underground Grain Silos) was one of the early convict tasks. In order to service Royal Navy ships, the Fitzroy Dock was built on the island and completed in 1857. Cockatoo became the major government dockyard in Australia.

In 1869 prisoners were transferred from the island to Darlinghurst, and the prison buildings became an industrial school for girls and a reformatory from 1871. At this time the name of the island became Biloela. The dockyard area was now separated from this institutional area on the top of the island by a fence. Following the departure of the females in 1888, prisoners were again sent to the island, and the jail function continued until about 1909. Meanwhile, the dockyard function expanded, and the Sutherland Dock was built in 1890. The New South Wales Public Works Department declared Cockatoo the state dockyard.

After Federation, in 1913 Cockatoo became the Commonwealth Dockyard, and the island, both through ship-building and servicing, played an important role both in the development of the Royal Australian Navy and during the First World War. The former prison buildings were now used for offices and other purposes. From 1933 the dockyard was leased from the Australian Government by Cockatoo Docks and Engineering Co Ltd and the island played a very significant role during the Second World War. After the war the dockyard (now known as Vickers) continued, and submarine facilities were introduced. The dockyard closed in 1992, and some demolition took place. Sale of the island was proposed. The island is now vested in the Sydney Harbour Federation Trust.

There are four elements to this precinct: Biloela House, a modest cottage adjacent, Clerk of Petty Sessions Cottage, and some of the island's grain silos.

Biloela House was built c.1841 as a superintendent's residence and it was designed by Colonel George Barney, the Commanding Royal Engineer who played a notable engineering role in New State Wales during the period. The building was soon enlarged. Again in 1859-60 extensions were erected to accommodate the new Engineer in Chief and Superintendent, Gother Kerr Mann. During the period of the girls school, the residence was occupied by the new registrar of the Sydney water police who stayed until 1896. By 1898 the house had become two barrack quarters for the unmarried male and female jail warders. With the Commonwealth takeover in 1913, the northern quarters became the shipyard manager's home and the southern became offices.

Little historical information is available for the small cottage adjacent to Biloela House.

Clerk of Petty Sessions Cottage was built prior to 1845 and was also designed by the Commanding Royal Engineer. Extensions were soon added and the building's orientation changed. In the early 1890s extensive changes were made and the building was also re-roofed; the building today is basically the 1890s plan. It has always been a residence. By 1892 it was the foreman shipwright's house and then, upgraded, the dock master's residence.

The main buildings in the group, along with the Prison Barracks Precinct, form the only imperial-funded (as opposed to colonial-funded) convict public works complex in NSW.

Due to the uncertain grain supplies available in the early colony of NSW, Governor Gipps in 1839 decided to embark on a program of silo construction on the Island. In this way grain could be stored for future use. The silos were designed by Barney and were excavated into Cockatoo's sandstone by convict work gangs and, being well sealed, the silos were weevil-free. By November 1840 20,000 bushels of wheat were stored in the completed silos, and other silos were underway. Gipps hoped to increase storage up to 100,000 bushels if the low price of wheat then prevailing continued. Over twenty silos were eventually quarried. However, as grain storage (and hence regulation of the market) was at odds with Britain's subsequent free market policies, Gipps was instructed to sell the grain. Later, either in the 1870s or early 1880s, the silos were re-used for water storage purposes. Some of the silos were subsequently destroyed by building construction. The surviving silos on the Island are believed to be the only group of convict-cut rock silos in the nation. The other major group of convict constructed underground silos are located on Norfolk Island, these are cut into the earth.

== Description ==
The Biloela House precinct includes:

- Biloela House, the former superintendent's quarters and extensions (stone enclosure of western corner excluded)
- the stone cottage to west of Biloela House
- remaining underground silos to south-east of Biloela House
- north-east part of small sandstone cottage south-east of Biloela house (Clerk of Petty Sessions Cottage)

The Biloela House precinct is located on the summit of the island and consequently the precinct possesses notable aesthetic qualities given its site on Sydney Harbour's biggest island and its harbour outlook.

Biloela House is Old Colonial Georgian in style. It is L-shaped, and the small cottage adjacent is rectangular, thus the two form a courtyard. The buildings are of similar style and are constructed of unpainted sandstone. Windows are mainly casements. The roofs are hipped and clad in corrugated iron. There is a picket fence.

The Clerk of Petty Sessions Cottage is modest and single storey. It was originally constructed of sandstone, but has been extended in brick and fibreboard. Here the roof is again hipped and clad with corrugated iron; there are several chimneys. An infilled verandah faces a grassed area with walled garden near the escarpment.

The silos appear to be nine in number, though not all are necessarily intact or complete. The perfectly symmetrical silos are bottle-shaped, and an incision on the surface of the rock indicates the diameter of the silo below ground. The mouth is square and provided with a lip to exclude water; there is also a metal plate over the mouth. The "bottle" is circular in plan and approaching 5.5 metres in diameter. The silos held from 3000 to 5000 bushels of grain each. Visible evidence of thirteen silos remains on the island (the other silos are part of the Underground Grain Silos).

=== Condition ===
The 1997 Conservation Management Report commented that Biloela House had been re-roofed. The stonework of the north and south wings was in mainly good condition. The north wing interior was generally good, though the south was in need of work. The Clerk of Petty Sessions Cottage was in very good condition and had been recently re-painted and re-roofed. The fireplace in the front room had been blocked. As at May 2001, the surviving silos are understood to be in good condition.

== Heritage listing ==
The Biloela House precinct was listed on the Australian Commonwealth Heritage List on 22 June 2004 having satisfied the following criteria.

Criterion A: Processes

Constructed mainly in the early 1840s, the elements of the Biloela Group are historically highly significant for their direct association with convict administration in the Australian colonies. The group is also associated with Cockatoo Island's role as a major government shipyard.

Criterion B: Rarity

The group, along with the separately registered prison barracks precinct, is the only remaining imperially funded convict public works complex in NSW. The silos on the island are believed to be the only major group of convict-cut rock silos in Australia.

Criterion D: Characteristic values

The group, along with the separately registered prison barracks precinct, is the only remaining imperially funded convict public works complex in NSW. As such, the buildings in the group are important examples of convict structures of the period.

Criterion E: Aesthetic characteristics

Located on the summit of Cockatoo Island (the largest island in Sydney Harbour), the group has an impressive harbour outlook and is evocative of the convict era. As such, the group with its sandstone forms has significant aesthetic qualities.

Criterion F: Technical achievement

The silos are finely excavated and reflect a high degree of stonemasonry skills on the part of their builders.

Criterion H: Significant people

The group has a close association with Colonel George Barney, the commander of the Royal Engineers, who played a notable engineering role in NSW during the period.
