= Fitzroy Dock =

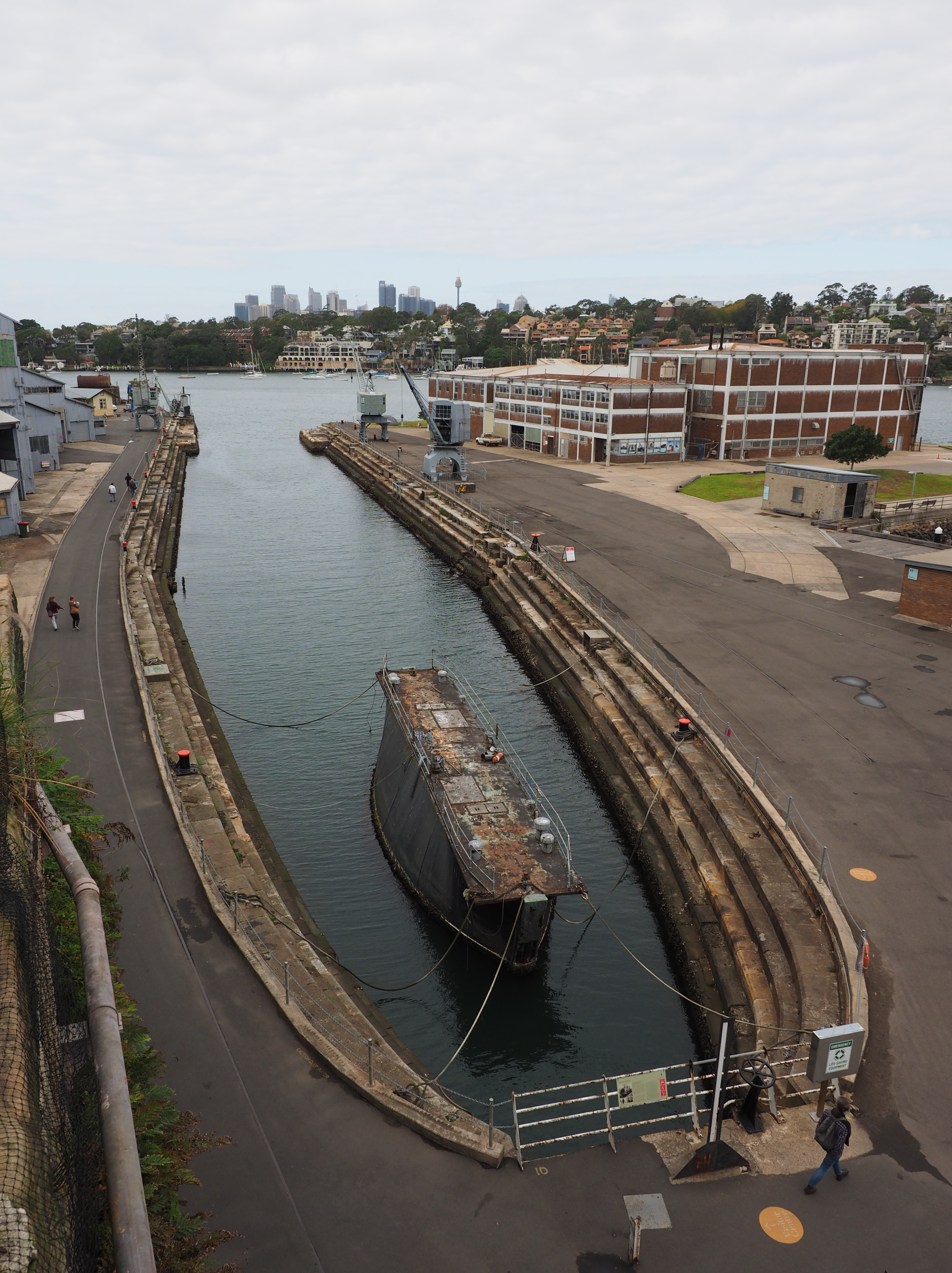
- Fitzroy Graving Dock

- Location within inner Sydney
- 33.8486°S 151.1729°E
- Location: Cockatoo Island, Sydney Harbour, New South Wales, Australia

Commonwealth Heritage List
- Official name: Fitzroy Dock
- Type: Listed place (Historic)
- Designated: 22 June 2004
- Reference no.: 105261

Fitzroy Dock is a heritage-listed dockyard at the former Cockatoo Island Dockyard, Cockatoo Island, Sydney Harbour, New South Wales, Australia. It was added to the Australian Commonwealth Heritage List on 22 June 2004.

== History ==
Cockatoo Island became a gaol in 1839, following advice from NSW Governor George Gipps to the British Secretary of State for the Colonies that convicts would be sent to the island after the closure of the Norfolk Island convict establishment. The convict precinct was built over a number of years. Quarrying of silos was one of the early convict tasks. To service Royal Navy ships, Fitzroy Dock was completed in 1857 (see below). Cockatoo became the major government dockyard in Australia.

In 1869, prisoners were transferred from the island to Darlinghurst, and the prison buildings became an industrial school for girls and a reformatory in 1871. The dockyard area was now separated from the institutional area on the top of the island by a fence. Following the departure of the females in 1888, prisoners were again sent to the island, and the gaol function continued until about 1909. Meanwhile, the dockyard function expanded, and the Sutherland Dock was built in 1890. The NSW Public Works Department declared Cockatoo Island the state dockyard.

Following the Federation, in 1913, the Australian Government declared Cockatoo Island to be the Commonwealth Dockyard, and the island, both through shipbuilding and servicing, played an important role both in the development of the Royal Australian Navy and during World War I. The former prison buildings were now used as offices. In 1933, the dockyard was leased from the Australian Government by Cockatoo Docks and Engineering Co Ltd and the island played a very significant role during World War II. After the war, the dockyard (now known as Vickers) continued, and submarine facilities were introduced. The dockyard closed in 1992, and some demolition took place. A sale of the island was proposed. The island is now vested in the Sydney Harbour Federation Trust.

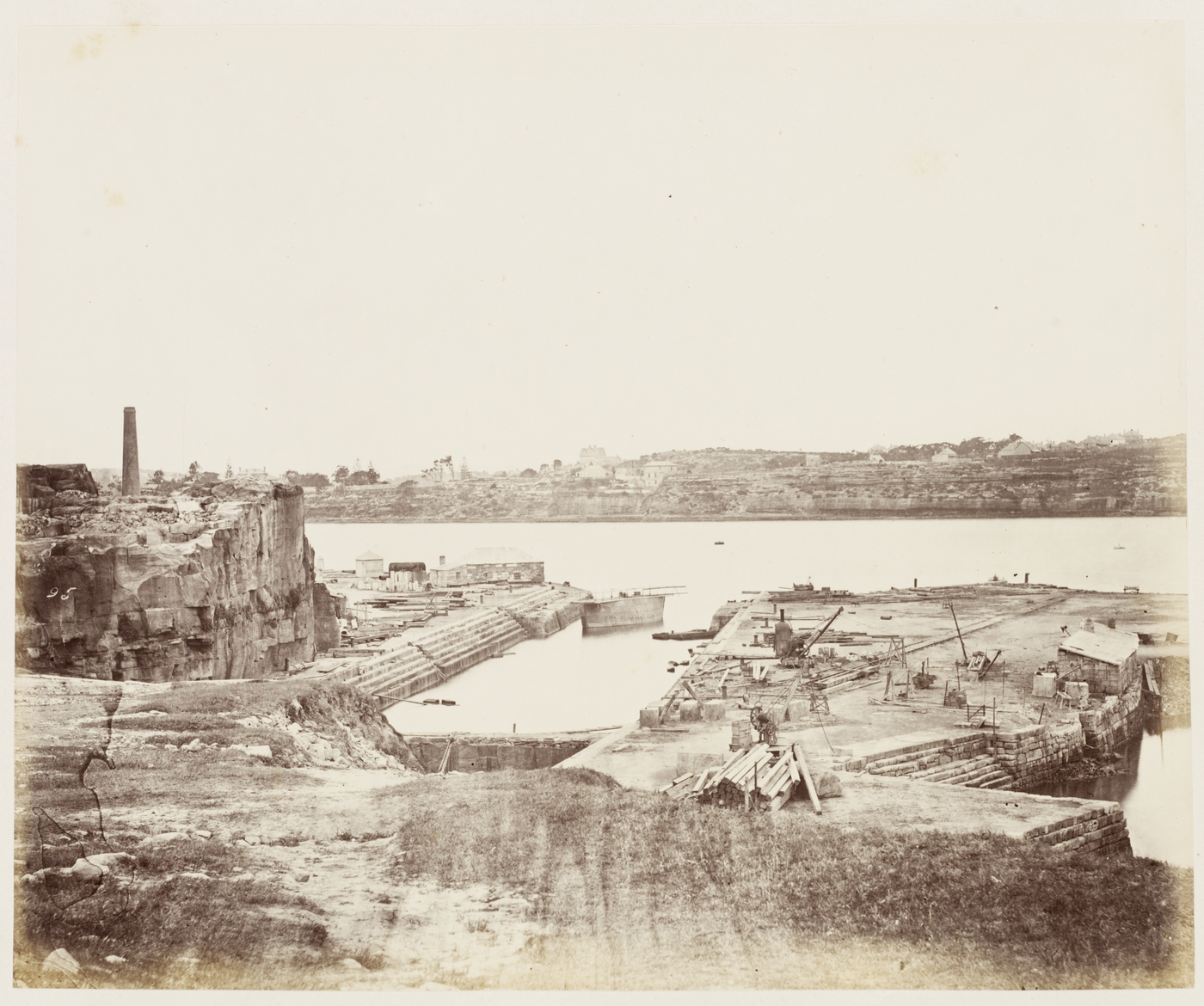
Fitzroy Dock in 1872

Fitzroy Dock was constructed to enable the servicing of Royal Navy ships in eastern Australian waters. Cockatoo Island was selected as the site due to the availability of good stone for building, and the presence of a convict labour force on site. NSW Governor Gipps put the proposal in 1846, the New South Wales Legislative Council approved the project, and construction commenced in 1851. It was the first large graving or dry dock commenced in the southern hemisphere. However, Mort's Dock at Balmain, though begun later, was completed sooner. It was a commercial dock built by a free labour force and took one year to construct, whereas Fitzroy was entirely built by convicts and took six years. When completed in 1857, Fitzroy Dock was the largest dry dock in the Southern Hemisphere and one of the largest in the world at that time. It was the biggest engineering project completed in Australia to that time, and today (given that Mort's Dock closed many years ago) it is the oldest surviving dry dock in the nation.

The dock was designed and built under the direction of Captain Gother Kerr Mann. Mann was appointed Engineer-in-Chief on Cockatoo Island and he subsequently became Superintendent of Convicts as well. The dock was named after NSW Governor Sir Charles Augustus FitzRoy who laid the inverted keystone in 1853. The steam-powered pumping machinery was purchased from the company of George and Sir John Rennie of London and was brought out by Henry Broderick, who became the first dock master and chief engineer at the dock. Construction of the dock required the blasting of a large section of cliff, supervised by Mann, which saw the first use of electrical firing of gunpowder in Australia.

Work done on ships in the dock (by convicts initially) included shoring up, scraping, cleaning and painting of vessels. Until Sutherland Dock opened on Cockatoo in 1890, all servicing of Royal Navy vessels was conducted at Fitzroy. Sutherland Dock had been necessitated by the increasing length of ships as the 1800s proceeded, but Fitzroy was itself twice lengthened (by free labour) from the original c.96 metres to the present c.145 metres. Once Sutherland was opened, the original pumping arrangement for Fitzroy was superseded by the new Sutherland pump house at the western end of the island.

During the twentieth century, Fitzroy catered still to smaller allied naval ships and the smaller ships (e.g. destroyers etc.) of the Royal Australian Navy. The dock thus played an important role during the First and Second World Wars.

== Description ==
Fitzroy Dock is located on the south-eastern corner of Cockatoo Island in Sydney Harbour (Port Jackson). It is a dry dock now c.145 metres in length and its sides are stepped with sandstone blocks to facilitate the propping of ships for stabilisation. The original bollards (ex-12-pounder cannons set at the top of the dock) are still in position. The present floating caisson (the gate to the dry dock) dates possibly from the early twentieth century, is constructed of rivetted and welded plate steel and has a rubber seal over its original timber one.

Fitzroy Dock is one of the largest convict-era public works in Sydney. It is a major element of Cockatoo Island's built landscape and, contributing strongly to the island's maritime and convict associations, it has considerable aesthetic value.

=== Condition ===
The 1997 Conservation Management Plan noted that the caisson was in disrepair. As of May 2001, the dry dock was filled with water.

== Heritage listing ==
Fitzroy Dock was listed on the Australian Commonwealth Heritage List on 22 June 2004 having satisfied the following criteria.

Criterion A: Processes

Fitzroy Dock, completed in 1857, is the oldest surviving dry dock in Australia and has direct associations with the convict era in Sydney, the state's maritime history, Australia's naval relationship with its allies (Britain particularly during the nineteenth and early twentieth centuries) and Australia's naval development, especially during the First and Second World Wars. It is one of the nation's most important former graving docks and has great historical significance.

Attributes: The excavation, evidence of the dock's sequential enlargement, and all remaining fabric associated with the dock's operation.

Criterion B: Rarity

The dock is one of the largest convict-era public works surviving in Sydney.

Attributes: Evidence of the dock's initial dimensions, and any evidence of its construction technique.

Criterion D: Characteristic values

Fitzroy Dock is important as an example of a nineteenth-century harbour facility of this type.

Attributes: The excavation and any fabric remaining from its nineteenth-century use.

Criterion E: Aesthetic characteristics

Fitzroy Dock is a major element of Cockatoo Island's built landscape, a key foreshore element on the island, and, contributing strongly to the island's maritime and convict associations and atmosphere, it has considerable aesthetic value.

Attributes: The form, fabric and setting of the dock, including scale, texture and massing.

Criterion F: Technical achievement

The dock was the earliest dry dock commenced in Australia, was the largest engineering project completed in Australia to that time and was large by world standards. It therefore has considerable technological significance and also reflects good design and construction qualities.

Attributes: The dock's dimensions and all associated fabric.
