= Sutherland Dock =

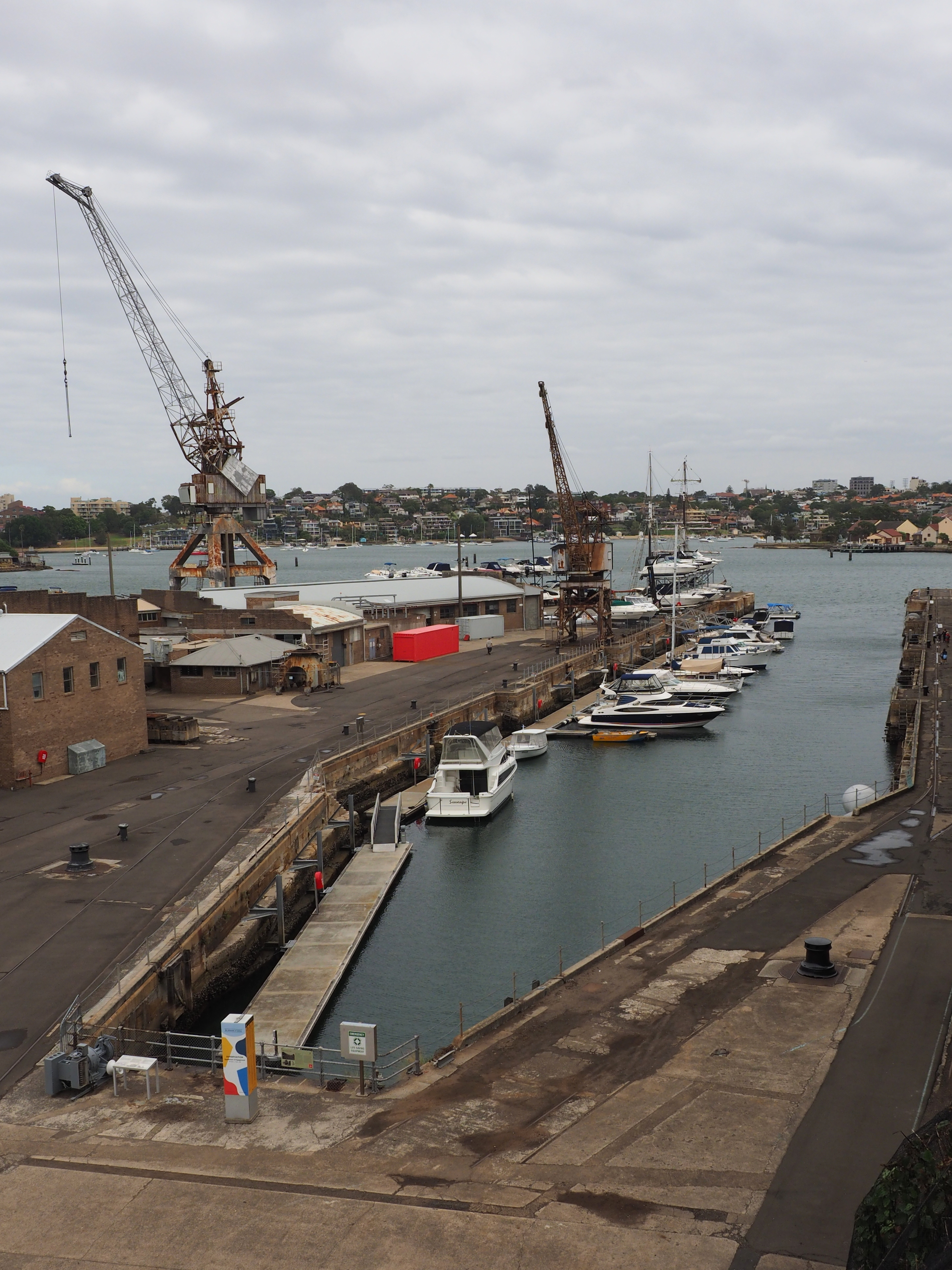
- Sutherland Dock

- Location within inner Sydney
- 33.8484°S 151.1703°E
- Location: Cockatoo Island, New South Wales, Australia

Commonwealth Heritage List
- Official name: Sutherland Dock
- Type: Listed place (Historic)
- Designated: 22 June 2004
- Reference no.: 105260

Sutherland Dock is a heritage-listed dockyard at the former Cockatoo Island Dockyard, Cockatoo Island, New South Wales, Australia. It was added to the Australian Commonwealth Heritage List on 22 June 2004.

== History ==
Cockatoo Island became a gaol in 1839, following advice from New South Wales Governor George Gipps to the British Secretary of State for the Colonies that convicts would be sent to the island after the closure of the Norfolk Island convict establishment. The convict precinct was built over a number of years. Quarrying of silos was one of the early convict tasks. To service Royal Navy ships, Fitzroy Dock was completed in 1857. Cockatoo became the major government dockyard in Australia.

In 1869 prisoners were transferred from the island to Darlinghurst, and the prison buildings became an industrial school for girls and a reformatory in 1871. The dockyard area was now separated from the institutional area on the top of the island by a fence. Following the departure of the females in 1888, prisoners were again sent to the island, and the gaol function continued until about 1909. Meanwhile, the dockyard function expanded, and the Sutherland Dock was built in 1890. The New South Wales Public Works Department declared Cockatoo Island the state dockyard.

Following Federation, in 1913 Cockatoo became the Commonwealth Dockyard, and the island, both through shipbuilding and servicing, played an important role both in the development of the Royal Australian Navy and during World War I. The former prison buildings were then used as offices. From 1933 the dockyard was leased from the Australian Government by Cockatoo Docks and Engineering Co Ltd and the island played a very significant role during World War II. After the war the dockyard (now known as Vickers) continued, and submarine facilities were introduced. The dockyard closed in 1992, and some demolition took place. Sale of the island was proposed. The island is now vested in the Sydney Harbour Federation Trust.

As the nineteenth century proceeded, the size of ships increased as steel came into more widespread use in shipbuilding. Fitzroy Dock was becoming increasingly unable to handle bigger ships. Consequently, it was decided to build a new dry dock on Cockatoo Island. Drawings were made in 1882 and excavation of the dock into the sandstone commenced. Sutherland Dock was designed and built by engineer Louis Samuel who won the contract at the age of 23. Samuel died at 26, not long before the dock was finished; the job was completed by his younger brother Edward. Unlike Fitzroy Dock (built by convicts), the workforce on Sutherland was free.

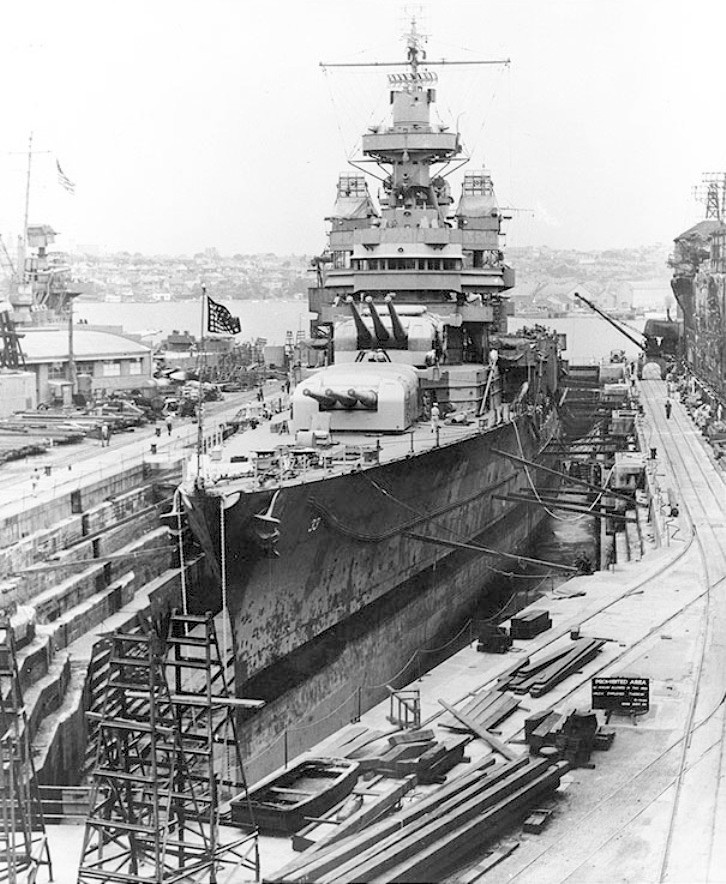
USS Portland (CA-33) in Sutherland Dock in c.1942.

When completed in 1890, Sutherland Dock was 635 feet long and 84 feet wide at the entrance. It was then said to be the biggest dry dock in the world (in terms of its width and depth of water over the sill) and was one of Australia's most significant engineering projects to that time. Subsequently, twice the dock was increased in size to meet the needs of ever bigger Australian naval vessels, reaching 690 feet (210 metres) in length in 1927, and a width of 27 metres. The dock was named after John Sutherland, the Minister for Works in the government of Sir Henry Parkes, and cost £267,825. A special feature of the design was the caisson (or "gate" of the dry dock) which was very heavy wrought iron, pulled by an endless chain horizontally on bronze rollers and it moved in a particularly effective fashion; it was steam powered but was converted to electricity in 1918. The dock was also fitted with electric lights to facilitate emergency work at night. A new pump house on the west of the island was built for the dock, and this was also used for Fitzroy Dock.

Sutherland Dock catered to the larger Royal Navy vessels, then, following the establishment of the Royal Australian Navy, it dealt with the bigger RAN ships, such as the battle cruiser, cruiser and other large classes. These sorts of RAN ships docked at Sutherland twice yearly for routine scraping and painting and other work. Much of this role transferred to Garden Island following the completion in 1945 of the bigger Captain Cook Graving Dock, but Sutherland still took large ships, and HMAS Melbourne docked at Sutherland after the tragic collisions with HMAS Voyager and USS Frank E. Evans. Many non-navy ships, e.g. merchant and some passenger vessels, also used Sutherland Dock.

== Description ==
Sutherland Dock is at Cockatoo Island in Sydney Harbour (Port Jackson).

Sutherland Dock is a dry or graving dock and is located on the south-western side of Cockatoo Island, where it is excavated into the island's sandstone. The dock is 210 metres long and the depth of water over the sill at high tide is 9.75 metres. The drive chain and mechanism for moving the caisson is still extant. There are steam travelling jib cranes at the dock.

The dock is a major feature of the island's built landscape and, contributing strongly to the island's maritime associations, it has considerable aesthetic value.

=== Condition ===
The 1997 Conservation Management Plan noted that the caisson and mechanism was still extant and had, at least until recently, been functional. As at May 2001, Sutherland Dock was filled with water.

== Heritage listing ==
Sutherland Dock was listed on the Australian Commonwealth Heritage List on 22 June 2004 having satisfied the following criteria.

Criterion A: Processes

Sutherland Dock, completed in 1890, has a direct and lengthy association with NSW's maritime history, Australia's naval relationship with its allies, and Australia's naval development, particularly during the First and Second World Wars. It is one of the nation's most important former graving docks and has great historical significance.

Criterion B: Rarity

The enlargement of the dock over time reflects the development in warship construction, and shipbuilding more generally, during the early twentieth century.

Criterion D: Characteristic values

Sutherland Dock is important as an example of a nineteenth century harbour facility of this type.

Criterion E: Aesthetic characteristics

Sutherland Dock is a major element of Cockatoo Island's built landscape, a key foreshore element on the island, and, contributing strongly to the island's maritime associations and atmosphere, it has considerable aesthetic value.

Criterion F: Technical achievement

At the time of its opening, Sutherland was said to be the biggest dry dock in the world. It was one of Australia's greatest engineering projects (and remained the nation's largest dry dock until 1945), and therefore has considerable technological significance. It also reflects good design and construction qualities. Further, the original caisson and its distinctive mechanism are still extant.
