= NSW Public Works =

Australian Government Agency

Agency overview
- Formed: 1859
- Preceding agencies: New South Wales Office of Public Works & Services; New South Wales Department of Public Works; New South Wales Public Works Advisory
- Jurisdiction: New South Wales
- Headquarters: 4 Parramatta Square, 12 Darcy Street, Parramatta, Sydney
- Employees: 500
- Minister responsible: Tara Moriarty MP, Minister for Regional New South Wales
- Agency executive: Drew Varnum, Executive Director
- Parent Agency: Department of Regional NSW
- Website: https://www.publicworks.nsw.gov.au/

NSW Public Works (or New South Wales Public Works) is a statutory agency of the Government of New South Wales that is responsible for providing expert advice to government and professional services, as well as government agency clients in New South Wales, Australia.

The agency manages a range of large and small projects and facilities contracts with an annual value of more than A$1 billion. It merged with Property NSW to form a new Property and Advisory Group of the New South Wales Public Works Advisory in July 2016.

The agency was led by Deputy Director-General, presently Brian Baker, who reported to the Director General of the Department of Finance, Services and Innovation, most recently Martin Hoffman, who reported to the Minister for Finance, Services and Property, most recently Victor Dominello MP.

NSW Public Works is an active agency as of 2024
