= Sydney Harbour Federation Trust =

Australian Government agency

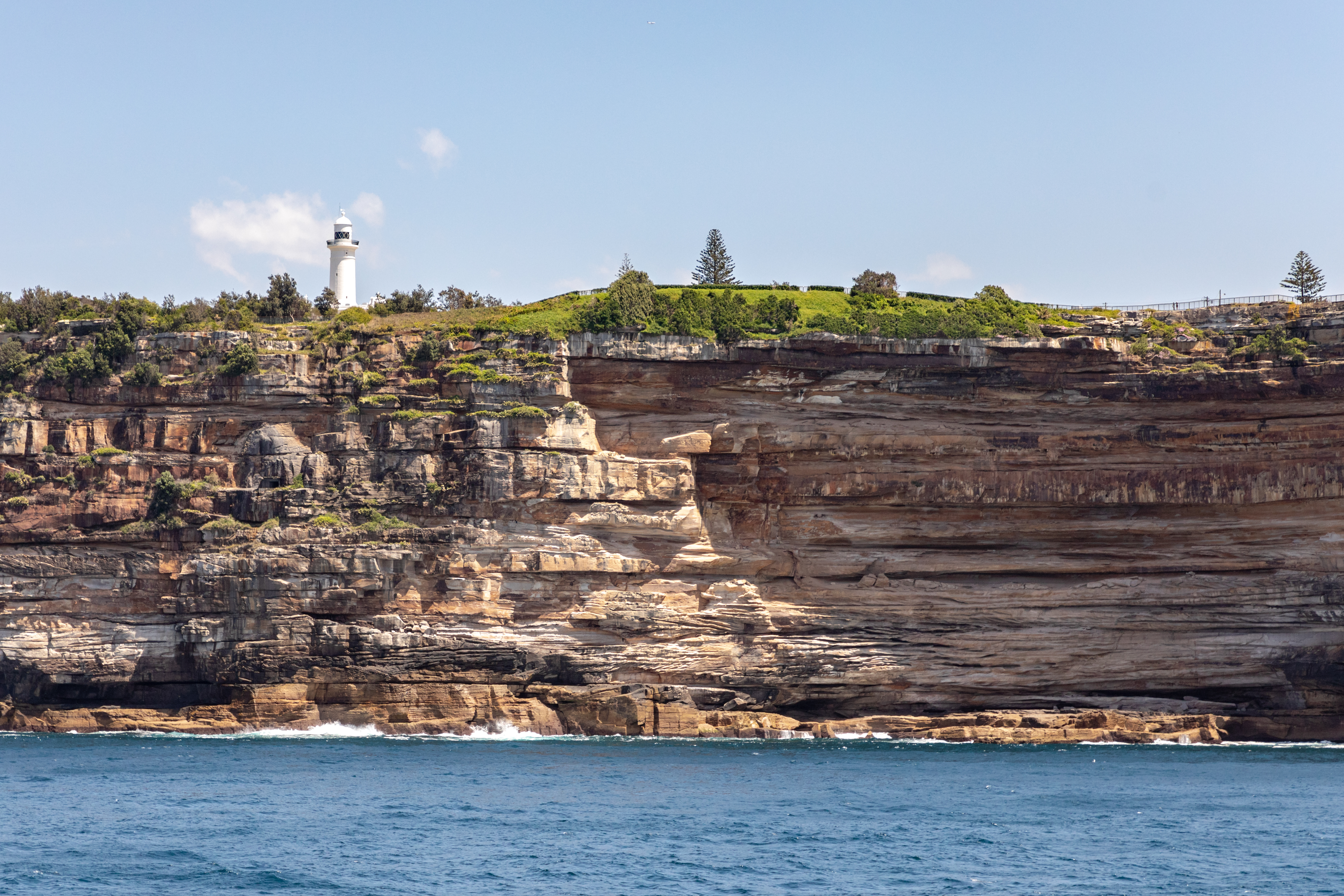
- The shoreline at Vaucluse with the Macquarie Lighthouse

Statutory authority overview
- Formed: 20 September 2001; 24 years ago
- Jurisdiction: Cockatoo Island, North Head, Georges Heights, Middle Head Fortifications, Macquarie Lighthouse, Snapper Island, HMAS Platypus, Chowder Bay
- Headquarters: Building 28, Best Avenue, Mosman, New South Wales
- Minister responsible: Tanya Plibersek, Minister for the Environment and Water
- Statutory authority executives: Tim Entwhistle, Chair; Janet Carding, Executive Director
- Parent Statutory authority: Department of Climate Change, Energy, the Environment and Water
- Key document: Sydney Harbour Federation Trust Act, 2001
- Website: www.harbourtrust.gov.au

The Sydney Harbour Federation Trust or simply the Harbour Trust is an Australian Government agency established in 2001 to preserve and rehabilitate a number of defence and other Commonwealth lands in and around Sydney Harbour. The Trust has been focused on the remediation of protected islands and make the islands accessible to the public.

== Jurisdiction ==
The lands managed by the Harbour Trust are:

- Cockatoo Island
- Headland Park, Mosman (Middle Head, Georges Heights and Chowder Bay)
- North Head Sanctuary (Former School of Artillery), North Head, Manly
- Woolwich Dock and Parklands
- Macquarie Lighthouse
- Snapper Island
- Former Marine Biological Station, Watsons Bay
- HMAS Platypus, Neutral Bay

A number of other bodies have responsibility for the management of lands around Sydney Harbour including the Sydney Harbour National Park, an entity of the New South Wales State Government.

Parking and other illegal activities on Sydney Harbour Trust land is enforced as a Commonwealth offence by special Sydney Harbour Trust rangers, which is a minimum $100 fine and is not enforced as a NSW Government State Debt Recovery Office matter.

== Trust Members ==
The Trust comprises eight non-executive members (including a chair) appointed by the Minister for the Environment and Water for a three-year term. Two members are appointed on the recommendation of the NSW Government, one representing the interests of Aboriginal people, and another who provides a local government perspective and experience. The Executive Team comprises six directors under the leadership of an Executive Director. The Executive Director is appointed by the Minister on the recommendation of the Members of the Trust and manages the day-to-day affairs of the agency under trust oversight. The current members of the Trust are:

Chair	Term begins	Term ends
Professor Tim Entwisle	14 December 2023	14 December 2026
Member	Term begins	Term ends
Alison Page (Deputy Chair)	31 March 2022	30 March 2027
Terry Bailey	2 November 2023	1 November 2026
Alexandra O’Mara	14 December 2023	14 December 2026
Ann Sherry AO	14 December 2023	14 December 2026
Helen Lochhead AO	18 September 2024	17 September 2027
Brad Manera	18 September 2024	17 September 2027
Daniel Gilbert AM	26 November 2024	25 November 2027

=== Chairs ===
#	Chair	Term	Time in office	Notes
1	Kevin McCann AO	20 September 2001 – 26 September 2010	9 years, 6 days	
2	Anthea Tinney PSM	24 May 2011 – 5 March 2015	3 years, 285 days	
–	Kevin McCann AO	9 June 2015 – 30 June 2018	3 years, 21 days	
3	Joseph Carrozzi AM	1 July 2018 – 30 June 2023	4 years, 364 days	
–	Alison Page (acting)	1 July 2023 – 14 December 2023	167 days	
4	Professor Tim Entwisle	14 December 2023 –	2 years, 238 days	

== See also ==
- Protected areas of New South Wales
