= Border Police of New South Wales =

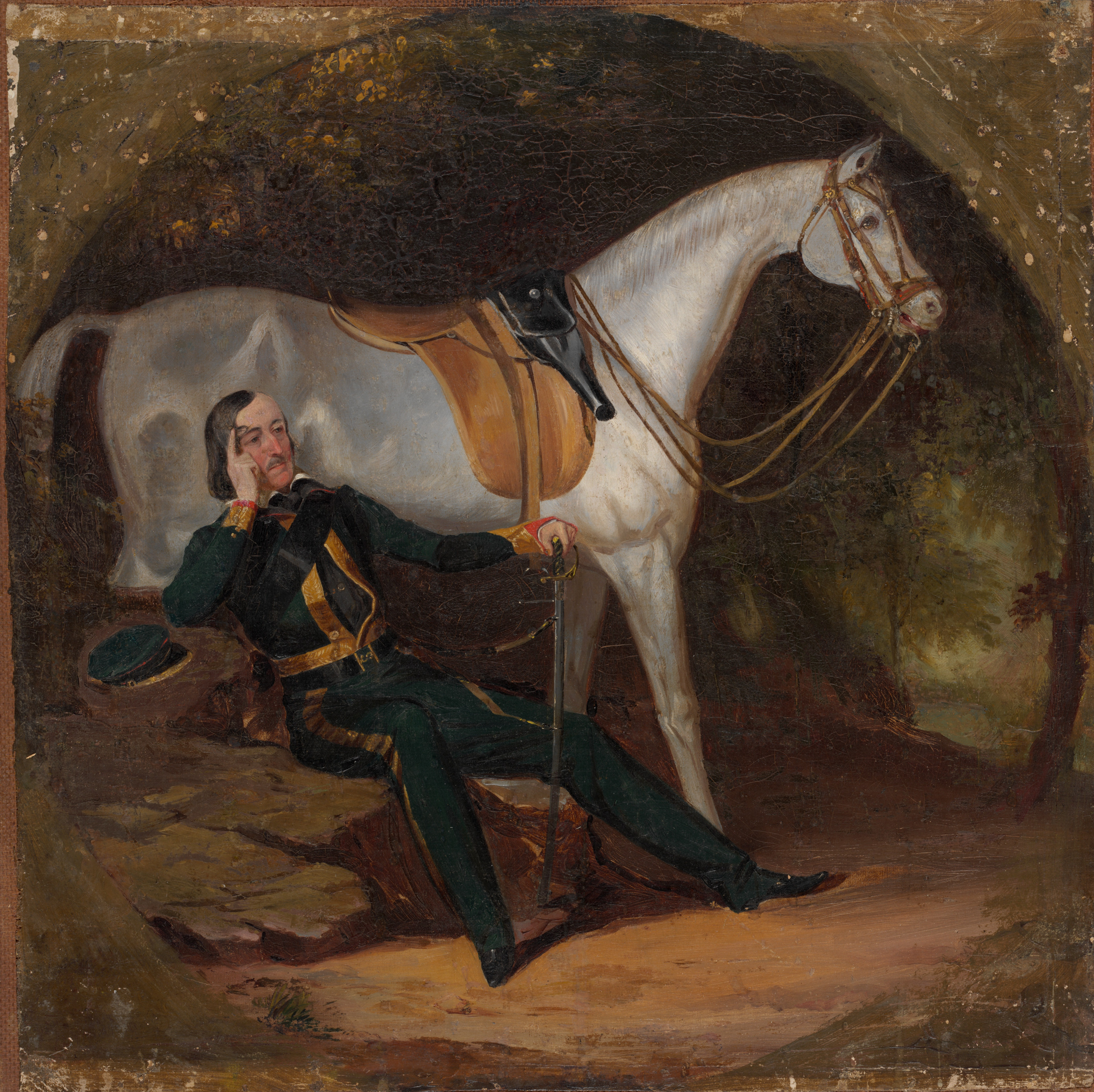
Commissioner Henry Bingham c1840

The Border Police of New South Wales was a frontier policing body introduced by the colonial government of New South Wales with the passing of the Crown Lands Unauthorised Occupation Act 1839.

The Colony of New South Wales was expanding rapidly in the late 1830s, and the colonial government was concerned with the illegal occupation of lands and the rights of the Aboriginal people. The colonial government of New South Wales in 1839 legislated for a new policing body that would control these issues. This force was called the Border Police.

The Border Police was organised into a number of sections and these were deployed to the various districts along the frontier. Each section was under the authority of the Commissioner of Crown Lands for that particular district and each commissioner had about 10 troopers. In order to reduce the cost of the force as much as possible, the troopers were taken from the population of convicts that existed in the colony at that time. The convicts assigned were usually ex-soldiers who had been transported to Australia due to crimes of military indiscipline. They were supplied with horses, equipment and rations, but were otherwise unpaid and had to construct their own barracks. The force was funded by a levy imposed on the squatters who were grazing their livestock on the Crown Lands in the frontier regions. The Border Police was largely disbanded by the late 1840s and was replaced in the expanding frontier regions by detachments of the Native Police.

== Establishment of the Border Police ==
In 1836, Governor Richard Bourke passed the "Squatting Act" to allow pastoralists or "squatters", as they were colloquially known, to run their sheep and cattle on New South Wales Crown Lands beyond the limits of white settlement for a small fee. However, the act failed to address the subsequent settler-Aboriginal conflict that the act would inevitable lead to. Beginning with the arrival of the First Fleet in 1788, paramilitary units such as the New South Wales Military Mounted Police and the Australian native police and armed settlers were the main instruments of suppressing Aboriginal resistance to European colonization. In 1838, two large mass-killings of Indigenous people occurred on the frontier. One was the Waterloo Creek massacre perpetrated by troops of the New South Wales Military Mounted Police, and the other was the Myall Creek massacre committed by a group of armed settlers.

As part of the response to these massacres, Governor Gipps amended the Squatting Act in 1839 to include the provision of a Border Police force to protect the frontier. The aim of this force was to protect expanding colonists and their land-holdings, while at the same time to attempt to "conciliate" the Aboriginal people, minimising the involvement of armed settlers. Edward Mayne, a Commissioner of Crown Lands, proposed the cost-saving idea of recruiting military convicts as troopers for the Border Police.

== Initial districts of operation ==
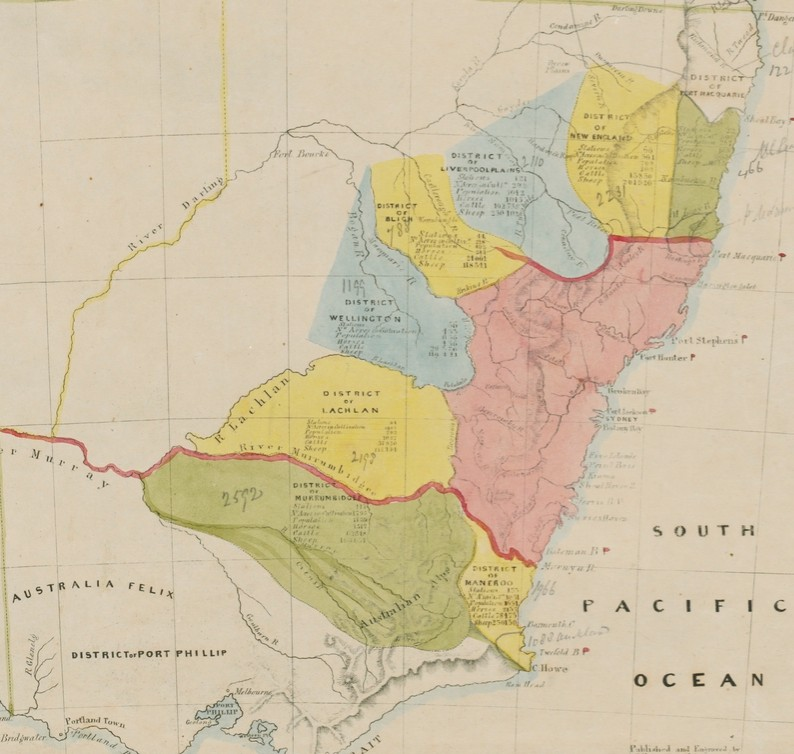
1841 map showing the districts of settlement in New South Wales

In 1839, there were nine districts in New South Wales legislated as being beyond the boundaries of settlement. These districts were Liverpool Plains, New England, Port Macquarie, Bligh, Wellington, Lachlan, Maneroo, Murrumbidgee and Port Phillip. All of these districts were deemed frontier areas and Border Police troopers were assigned to each.

=== Liverpool Plains ===
Edward Mayne was the first Commissioner to be allocated with a section of Border Police troopers. He was at the time based in the Liverpool Plains district. Mayne initially took the role of conciliator between the Aboriginal people and the pastoralists seriously, investigating the murders perpetrated by both sides in a balanced fashion. In 1839, he arrested five Gamilaraay men for the murder of two whites, and also put out an arrest warrant for Charles Eyles for the massacre of nine Aboriginal people in the same area. However, the warrant for Eyles went unheeded by the senior authorities, while the five Aboriginal men were all sentenced to imprisonment on Cockatoo Island with most of them dying from illness soon after incarceration. From then on Mayne and his fellow Commissioners of the other frontier districts understood that the priority role of their Border Police troopers was to protect the colonisers.

In 1840, Mayne established his Border Police barracks at Somerton on the Peel River. He had additional support further north around the Gwydir River with Corporal William Anderson of the New South Wales Mounted Police taking charge of several Border Police troopers based at Warialda. In the same year, Mayne captured escaped convict James Feeny who had been living with local Gamilaraay people and assisting them in acts of resistance. Feeny was attached as interpreter in Anderson's group, which was tasked with the "most severe duty" in the northern parts of the region. By 1841, conflict between the British settlers and the Aboriginal people beyond the Gwydir River became such a problem that Mayne was allocated an assistant Commissioner named Oliver Fry.

Mayne was replaced by Francis Allman Jnr in 1843, who was a favourite of the squatters and who did not let "the blacks..have everything their own way". Roderick Mitchell, son of the explorer Thomas Mitchell, was appointed assistant commissioner. Allman was the son of Captain Francis Allman, the first commandant of the Port Macquarie penal settlement, and his brother John had also been appointed Commissioner of Crown Lands for the Wellington district.

A notable Border Police trooper who served in the Liverpool Plains district up to October 1845 was Richard "Dick" Walker. On one occasion near the Castlereagh River, Walker's group shot dead thirteen Aboriginal people after they murdered and then ate a white girl.

In 1846, Roderick Mitchell was promoted to full commissioner of the district with Richard Bligh as his assistant commissioner. The majority of Mitchell's Border Police troopers were made up of Gamilaraay men from around the town of Tamworth. Mitchell travelled extensively during his tenure, exploring north along Balonne River and west along the Darling River to Fort Bourke where, he was attacked by the local inhabitants. In 1849, Mitchell was transferred to the Maranoa District and his Border Police force were decommissioned prior to this relocation.

=== New England ===
George James "Humpy" MacDonald was appointed the first Commissioner of Crown Lands in the New England district in 1839. He set up his headquarters and Border Police barracks on a grassy plain which he called Armidale after his ancestral home of Armadale in Scotland. He soon set out on a punitive expedition against a group of Aboriginal people led by a man labelled "Anti-Christ" but was unable to locate them. Local pastoralists expected MacDonald and his troopers to "drive these murderous savages from this quarter and...make an example of some of them."

Due to the New England district up to 1842 extending to the most out-lying pastoral stations to the north, MacDonald was often patrolling areas as far north as Moreton Bay. In 1841, MacDonald and his troopers were involved in a large massacre of Aboriginal people at the junction of the Clarence River and the Orara River. In an early morning raid, an Aboriginal campsite near the riverbank was attacked by his Border Police resulting in many casualties, the bodies of some apparently floating downriver past "The Settlement", now known as South Grafton. The massacre was inflicted as punishment for the theft of materials from Dr John Dobie's Ramornie station.

With MacDonald being absent from the New England district on a regular basis, the local squatters were often left to their own devices to arrange punitive missions against Aboriginal people. The squatters also resented the fact that MacDonald wasn't assigned a flogger to scourge servants as summary punishment for disobedience.

MacDonald left the area in 1848 to take up the position of Crown Land Commissioner in the Lower Darling district. He was replaced in the New England district by Robert George Massie. By this time, the Border Police were being slowly disbanded with Massie only having four mounted troopers by 1854. Most of his work by this stage was involved in maintaining order at the Rocky River goldfields, with the majority of police work being transferred to Lloyd Bradshaw who was chief constable at Armidale from 1847.

=== Wellington District ===
This district was bounded by the Bell River to the east, the Lachlan River to the south and the Macquarie River to the north. Lawrence Vance Dulhunty was the Commissioner of Crown Lands for the Wellington district from 1837 and in 1839 he was allocated a section of Border Police. Dulhunty was the brother of the wealthy colonist Robert Dulhunty and together in 1828 they had formed the pastoral station of Dubbo. Dulhunty was soon replaced as commissioner by John James Allman in February 1840.

Allman and his Border Police were involved in multiple skirmishes with Aboriginal people on the lower parts of the Macquarie River. In 1840, near Narromine, Allman attacked an Aboriginal camp, separated the men from the women and took seven people prisoner for stealing cattle. Allman received strong resistance during this operation and stated that it was unsafe for colonists to proceed further downriver from the Narromine property.

In 1841, Allman and his Border Police, together with armed settlers and troopers of the New South Wales Mounted Police, were involved in a large massacre of Aboriginal people along the Bogan River 30 km north of Nyngan. Colonists William Lee and Joseph Moulder having decided to ignore Allman's warning of taking up land in the lower reaches of the Macquarie and Bogan rivers, set up a cattle station near Mt Harris on the Bogan River. Conflict ensued with the local Aboriginal people resulting in three shepherds being killed. In response, troopers of the Border Police, the Mounted Police and a number of armed stockmen were sent on a punitive expedition to the area. This force was placed under the command of Commissioner Allman. Once the troopers arrived at the scene, they "fell in with the blacks..they galloped in upon them, firing at them, and cutting them down..they were shot and sabred indiscrimately." At least 12 Aboriginal people were killed. At a parliamentary enquiry the following year Allman attempted to distance himself from direct responsibility for the killings, however no action was taken against him or other members of the patrol. In fact, the parliamentarians were more concerned with Allman taking away Lee's pastoral licence for ignoring his direction to not take up land in that unsettled region.

Allman and his troopers, in a later incident, arrested a white man named George Evans for the killing of Tony, an Aboriginal man. Evans however was acquitted after spending several months in Bathurst jail. Allman was replaced as commissioner for the Wellington district by his brother, Francis Allman Jr in 1843 but he lasted only a couple of months in this position. William Henry Wright became the new Commissioner of Crown Lands.

In 1845, Wright ordered a number of troopers to deal with Aboriginal disturbances at the Macquarie Marshes and at Narromine. This force killed upwards of twenty people in these raids. Thomas Mitchell travelled through this region about 12 months after the raids describing that "All I could learn about the rest of the tribe was, that the men were almost all dead, and that their wives were chiefly servants at stock stations along the Macquarie." By the time of Mitchell's visit, most of Wright's Border Police troopers had been replaced by regular mounted troopers of the New South Wales Mounted Police. In late 1846, these mounted police under the command of Wright conducted another massacre of Aboriginal people living along the Bogan River near Bulgandramine.

=== Bligh District ===
This district consisted roughly of the area between the Castlereagh River to the north-east and the Macquarie River to the south-west. Graham Douglas Hunter was the long term Commissioner for the Bligh district, who based his Border Police office at Coolah. The Bligh district was relatively small and it seems much of Hunter's work was done by the Commissioners of the Wellington and Liverpool Plains districts. Hunter was the owner of a number of famous racehorses and was notorious for being absent from his post to attend race meetings as far away as Sydney. His Border Police troopers appear to have been equally neglectful of their duties, letting prisoners escape and leaving the squatters to undertake forceful measures against bushrangers. There is one instance, after Aboriginal people speared cattle on the Castlereagh River, Hunter sent down three troopers. Hunter found the Aboriginal Australians indolent and lazy. Hunter also stated that there was bloodshed when settlers took Aboriginal women to work in slavery on their pastoral properties.

=== Port Macquarie District ===
Henry Robert Oakes was the first commissioner of the Port Macquarie district which covered the coastal area from the Macleay River area north to the prison settlement on the Brisbane River. In a similar circumstance to Commissioner MacDonald from the New England district, Oakes and his contingent of Border Police were often summoned to patrol frontier areas in the northern parts of the colony. In 1840, Oakes led his troopers in blazing a coastal trail from Port Macquarie to the newly colonised Clarence River region. On arriving, he conducted a punitive expedition against local Aboriginal people who were "exceedingly troublesome, and committed various murders" on the pastoral run of William Forster. Upon setting out to return south, Oakes and his troopers "severely punished" Aboriginal people at Corindi after a station-hand was murdered at the newly formed Glenugie pastoral run.

In 1841, Oakes returned to the Clarence River region and set up a Border Police outpost just downriver from Copmanhurst. When the local Aboriginal people murdered two men, Oakes together with his troopers, his son Henry Richard Oakes and local land-holders such as Edward Ogilvie, coordinated an extensive series of expeditions in the upper parts of the Clarence River valley to capture the perpetrators. When the police were attacked on at least three occasions, it resulted in the killing of at least 15 Bundjalung people. Some of the children from these and similar raids were sent by Oakes to be educated at the Normal Institution in Sydney. In the same year, Oakes and his troopers was attacked by a group of Aboriginal people, and in self defence, were compelled to fire upon them, wounding or killing about twenty of them.

In the more southern parts of his district around the Macleay River, Oakes and his Border Police were also able to stop the murders by the Aboriginal people "by an armed display – by striking terror into their minds". Oakes set up a Border Police post on the banks of the Macleay River just opposite the newly formed township of Kempsey. At Kempsey, John Sullivan was appointed as an assistant commissioner with troopers to provide a force in the Macleay area while Oakes was away to the north. On at least one occasion, Oakes and Sullivan combined forces against the Yarra-happini clan in the Macleay valley, who they "dispersed with some slaughter". Previous to becoming a Commissioner for Crown Lands, Oakes had spent a considerable period of time in New Zealand. He brought to Australia with him a flogger of from New Zealand, whom he utilised to inflict corporal punishment on one of his Border Police troopers.

In 1842 the Port Macquarie district was split. The southern portion was now designated as the Macleay River district, and the northern part being named the Clarence River district. Both of these new districts were assigned their own commissioners and Border Police units.

=== Maneroo ===
Now known as the Monaro region, the Maneroo detachment of the Border Police was under the command of Commissioner John Lambie from 1839 until their decommission. In the colonial period the Maneroo district extended from the mountain plateaus of the Australian Alps down to the coast including the port of Twofold Bay. Some of this region had been colonised by white settlers since the early 1800s and hence much of the warfare against the Aboriginal people for land had already been fought. In particular the 1830s saw much conflict between the native population and the settlers with the Aboriginal people being largely forced into submission. Lambie himself said that the Aboriginal people in the district were "quiet and inoffensive" and that he required no "additional force necessary to keep them in order". However, Lambie was still allocated several Border Police troopers in 1839. By 1842 leading colonists such as Hannibal Macarthur were calling for the Border Police to be disbanded in the Maneroo district as there was "no danger of collision between the whites and the Aborigines".

=== Lachlan District ===
This district was bounded to the north by the Lachlan River and to the south by the Murrumbidgee River. Henry Cosby was the Commissioner of Crown Lands for this district from 1839 to 1841. On arriving in the area, Cosby found British colonists and overlanders at war with the local Wiradjuri clans. He led his Border Police and a group of armed stockmen on a 320 km mission to suppress Aboriginal resistance in the area. He found only deserted campsites and reported that the Wiradjuri were able to force nearly all the British pastoralists in the region to abandon their holdings west of Ganmain. By early 1841, the pastoralists, sometimes with the aid of Cosby and his troopers, were able to regain control over much of the area largely through the use of significant force resulting in several massacres of Aboriginal people. Cosby established his headquarters at Binalong and in addition to supporting efforts by settlers to colonise the region, his troopers were also involved in skirmishes with several bushranger gangs such as that of Scotchie and Whitton.

Henry Cosby died in 1841 and was replaced as Commissioner of Crowns Lands by Edgar Beckham who continued in the role until 1869 when he was suspended from duties for failing to collect pastoral licence fees. Beckham's contingent of Border Police however were dissolved many years earlier, probably around 1847. Previous to this date, Beckham and his troopers were involved in the capture of the bushranger known as Massey, and other outlaws such as two men who stole cattle to provide a large group of Aboriginal people who resided at the junction of the Lachlan River and Murrumbidgee River with food. The troopers arrested these suppliers and the Aboriginal people decamped with the appearance of the carbines. In 1844, two men escaped from Beckham's Border Police, committing robberies and stealing weapons, thereby disgracing the reputation and hastening the dissolution of the force in the district.

=== Murrumbidgee District ===
The Murrumbidgee River was the northern boundary and the Murray River was the southern boundary of the Murrumbidgee District. Henry Bingham was the Commissioner of this area for the period that the Border Police existed, establishing his headquarters at Tumut. Bingham appears to have had a more humane approach to Aboriginal people than most of the other commissioners due to the fact that his daughter was saved from drowning by a native of the region. However, this district had several choices of alternative paramilitaries to the Border Police to enforce colonial rule. Major James Nunn, of the Waterloo Creek massacre fame, was in charge of around 20 troopers of the New South Wales Mounted Police posted to the region. Furthermore, the Native Police of the Port Phillip District operated in the area and the Native Police that was formed under Frederick Walker had their origins in the Murrumbidgee District.

Frederick Walker himself was a non-convict corporal in the Border Police of the Murrumbidgee District, He was possibly part of the unit which Bingham had stationed at an outpost below the junction of the Murray River with the Edward River. Aboriginal resistance in the region was, at times, fierce with some native groups utilising firearms against the colonists. By the end of the 1840s, the Border Police were removed from service in the Murrumbidgee district.

=== Port Phillip District ===
In 1839, the Port Phillip district consisted roughly of most of the area that is now known as the state of Victoria. Henry Fyshe Gisborne was appointed the first Commissioner of Crown Lands for this district. He arrived overland from Sydney with his Border Police and a large array of horses in September of that year and was based at the large Mounted Police barracks where the Melbourne Cricket Ground now stands. In January 1840, Gisborne with some of his Border Police troopers and a contingent of New South Wales Mounted Police went on a mission up the Yarra River valley to arrest a group of Wurundjeri led by Jacky Jacky who were armed with firearms. Gisborne's group encountered the Wurundjeri at Yering where a firefight took place between the two opposing sides. Both sides withdrew from the contest with no clear victory. This event later became known as the Battle of Yering. Gisborne was soon after called upon to go with his troopers to the Mount Macedon region to quell Aboriginal resistance in this area. Due to the strong native opposition near Mount Macedon, Gisborne set up a Border Police outpost in this region. These barracks later evolved into the town of Gisborne which was named in the commissioner's honour. The barracks are now part of the Wyabun Park property.

In June 1840 the Port Phillip district was split into two with Portland Bay and Westernport districts being the names of the new squatting districts. Governor Gipps, who did not like Gisborne, removed him from his position of commissioner and Gisborne later died at sea whilst returning to England.

== Later districts of operation ==
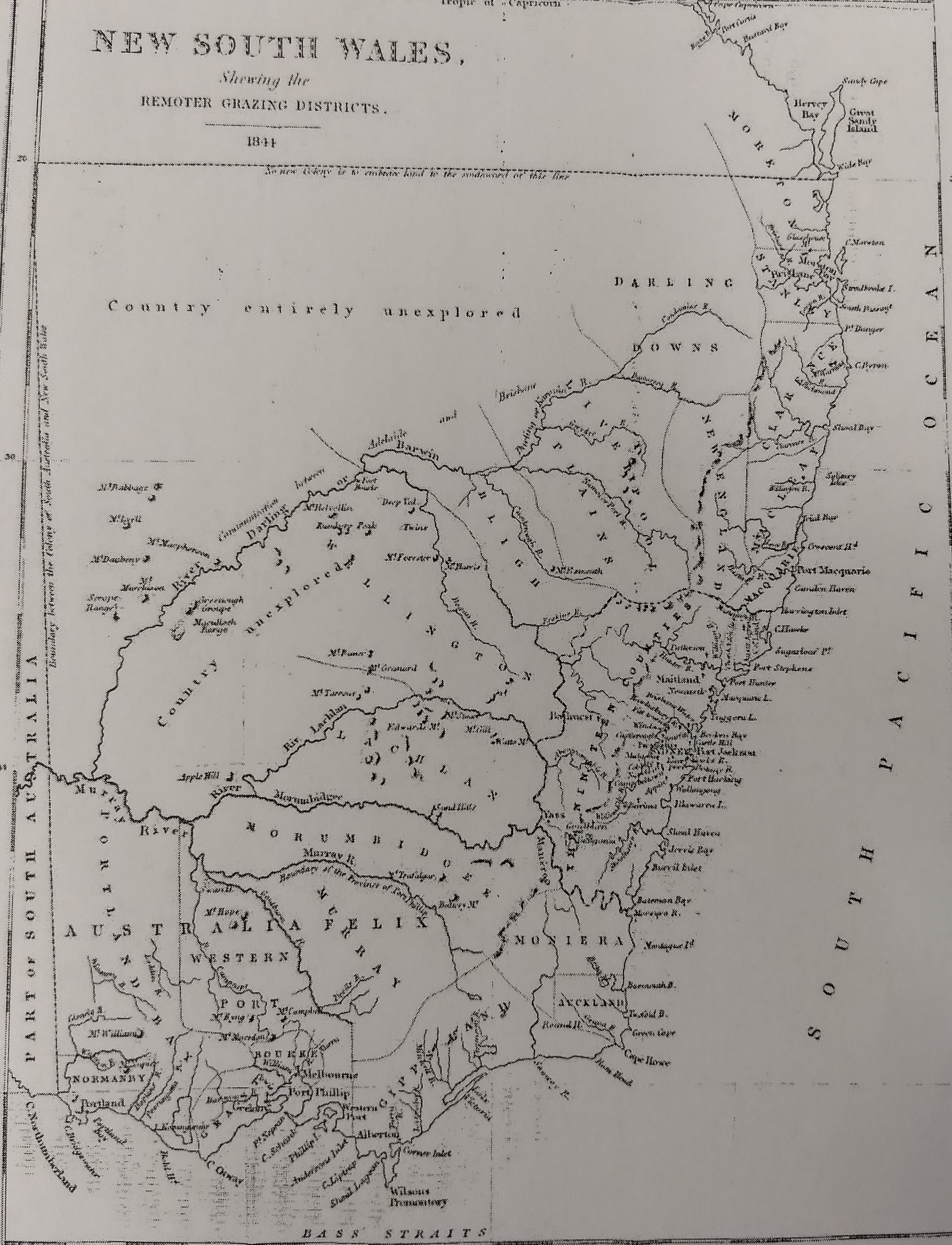
The squatting districts of New South Wales in 1844

In 1840, the Port Phillip district was split into two resulting in Western Port and Portland Bay districts being created. In 1842, the Port Macquarie district was also split in two, with Clarence and Macleay being the resultant districts. The Moreton Bay district was also added in that year. In 1843, the Darling Downs, Gippsland and Murray districts were formed. Some of these regions included areas that later became part of the colonies of Victoria and Queensland, but were at the time under the governmental control of New South Wales. Contingents of Border Police troopers were assigned to the Commissioners of Crown Lands for each of these frontier districts. The last squatting district to be formed that included an assigned section of Border Police was the Gwydir District in 1847.

=== Western Port ===
This district, proclaimed in 1840, initially was bounded to the south by Mount Macedon, to the west by the Bendigo region, to the north by the Murray River and to the east by the Yarra Ranges and Western Port. The first Commissioner of Crown Lands for this district was Frederick Armand Powlett. Powlett received a new batch of around 12 convict troopers from Sydney for his Border Police, and was soon dispatched to the Mount Macedon and Campaspe River areas in pursuit of recalcitrant groups of Aboriginal people.

In October 1840, Powlett and his Border Police troopers were involved in large operation two miles from Melbourne, apprehending an entire gathering of Wurundjeri and Taungurong people in what has become known as the Lettsom raid. Together with military personnel from the New South Wales Mounted Police and the 28th Regiment of the British Army under Major Samuel Lettsom, Powlett's unit took around 300 Aboriginal men, women and children prisoner on suspicion of causing disturbances hundreds of kilometres away near to the Ovens River. They shot dead a Taungurong man named Winberri and wounded several others during the arrest. The entire group was then led into Melbourne where thirty-three of the men were placed in irons and chained together. The chained men were placed in jail, while the others were locked into a warehouse. Forty people escaped from the warehouse after a number of elders provided a distraction resulting in the shooting death of one of these older men. The people in the warehouse were released two days later after having all their hunting instruments destroyed and dogs shot dead. Of the thirty-three jailed men, most were eventually released but nine Taungurong were found guilty of criminal behaviour and sentenced to a decade each of transportation.

In October 1841, reports reached Powlett that a group of Aboriginal Tasmanians who had been brought over to the Australian mainland by George Augustus Robinson, had attacked a coal-mining overseer and killed two whalers near Cape Paterson. Powlett and his Border Police failed to intercept the group, who attained firearms and proceeded in the following weeks to attack British settlers around Dandenong, Cape Schanck and Arthur's Seat wounding two more white men. Powlett's force again failed to capture the Tasmanians, but with the aid of soldiers from the 28th Regiment of Foot of the British Army and a group of local Wurundjeri people, the five Tasmanians were captured close to Cape Paterson. The prisoners consisting of two men (Tunnerminnerwait and Maulboyheenner) and three women (Truganini, Planobeena and Pyterruner) were taken to Melbourne for trial. Powlett and several of his Border Police troopers gave evidence against the Tasmanians at this trial and the two male prisoners were sentenced to death while the females were ordered to return to their place of exile in Flinders Island. Tunnerminnerwait and Maulboyheenner were the first people legally executed in the Port Phillip District and they were hanged at Gallows Hill near to the present site of Old Melbourne Gaol on 20 January 1842.

Powlett and his troopers made half-year tours of their jurisdiction, tracking wanted Aboriginal people and ensuring those on reserves "were improving their manners". In 1844, Powlett, with Henry Dana and four of his Native Police troopers were involved in an affray with Aboriginal people residing east of the Gariwerd mountains which resulted in one being shot and three wounded. Later that year, three of Powlett's troopers shot dead three Aboriginal people in the same area after they threw spears at the troopers. These troopers were brought to trial after complaints from the local Aboriginal Protector but all charges were dismissed. Well-known pastoralist Edward Micklethwaite Curr recounts the usual operation of Powlett being to appear before "the blacks at a gallop, sabre in hand, surrounded by his troopers industriously loading and discharging their carbines."

In October 1846, a number of Powlett's troopers were involved in a battle with around sixty or seventy Wadi Wadi people while capturing the suspected killers of the squatter Andrew Beveridge. These troopers, together with armed and mounted squatters and station-hands, killed and wounded a large number of attacking Aboriginal people near Piangil on the banks of the Murray River. They took three Wadi Wadi men as prisoners, who were later tried, resulting in two being found guilty of murdering the squatter and sentenced to death. These two men, called Bobby and Ptolemy, were executed in April 1847.

In December 1846, Powlett went on leave to Europe and Edward Grimes was appointed Commissioner of Crown Lands for Western Port in his absence. It appears that the Border Police in this district were disbanded not long into Grimes' tenure.

=== Portland Bay ===
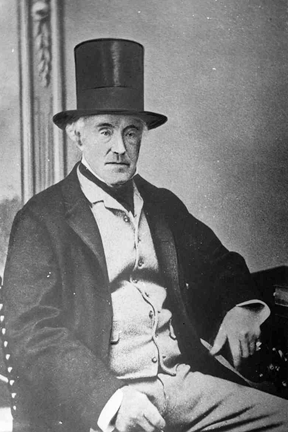
Foster Fyans

The district of Portland Bay was created in 1840. It was bounded on the west by the border with the colony of South Australia, to the north by the Murray River and to the east by the boundary with the Western Port district. The first Commissioner of Crown Lands for this district was Foster Fyans, a Peninsula War and First Anglo-Burmese War veteran and ex-commandant of the Norfolk Island and Brisbane penal settlements. Fyans, as his background suggests, was a brutal disciplinarian and the twelve Border Police convict troopers that were assigned to him were subjected to extremely harsh punishments for insubordination. This ranged from 50 lashes for drunkenness, a month of solitary confinement, and 12 months hard labour in leg-irons for absconding. Some of his troopers he regarded as useless and sent them back to convict jails. He replaced these with free men and local Aboriginal people such as Bon Jon. Fyans established his initial Border Police barracks in South Geelong in 1841. His troopers were soon in conflict with Djab wurrung people later that year, killing several of these native inhabitants near Mount Napier. Fyans gave thanks to his troopers (two of whom were severely injured) for their "correct conduct on this occasion".

In 1842, Fyans and his troopers were involved in a series of skirmishes with clans of the Djab Wurrung and Dhauwurd Wurrung people which was later to become known as the Eumeralla Wars. British settlers in the region around the Eumeralla River were in near continuous battles with the local Aboriginal people over possession of the land. The Aboriginal people would drive off and kill livestock, burn crops and fatally injure shepherds, while the settlers would organise armed groups to conduct raids against native encampments. Troopers of the New South Wales Mounted Police conducted punitive expeditions and in mid 1842, Fyans with 12 troopers of the Border Police entered the region. They encountered a group of around 30 Aboriginal people and after shooting dead a number of people, took several prisoners. Fyans and his force raided further camps and threatened to make an assault on the Aboriginal reserve at Mount Rouse if the Aboriginal Protector didn't give up a wanted man. The Border Police returned to Geelong but the violence around the Eumeralla continued. In September 1842, Charles La Trobe ordered Fyans and his troopers together with a contingent of Native Police back to the region to "take the most decided measures to put a check to these disorders". The result was a decisive "regular engagement" which took place near to Mount Eccles where the Aboriginal people were given "a scouring".

The Border Police in the Portland Bay district often located themselves on the runs of squatters in different localities for weeks at a time, providing active and constant intimidation against local clans of Aboriginal people. Troopers were often utilised in doing other work while on the properties such as shearing and sheep-washing. The troopers were also sent out to eliminate groups of bushrangers, but their success in these particular operations seems to have been limited. Also in 1842, Fyans was assisted in his duties by the appointment of Charles James Tyers to be Commissioner of Crowns Lands for the vicinity around the fledgling town of Portland in the far west of the district. Tyers appears not to have been given any Border Police troopers due to sections of Native Police and New South Wales Mounted Police already being present at nearby Mt Eckersley under the command of police magistrate James Blair. Tyers was transferred a year later, becoming Commissioner of Crown Lands for the Gippsland district.

In addition to using Border Police as militia against Aboriginal groups, Fyans was also able to form paramilitary brigades from the Barabool tribe of the Wathaurong people who lived in the Geelong area. In 1846, when a member of George Douglas Smythe's surveying expedition to Cape Otway was killed by Gadubanud people in the area, Fyans organised a kind of native police from the Barrabool men to accompany Smythe and himself on a punitive mission back to the Otway Ranges. This force located a family group of Ganubanud on the banks of the Aire River where in a dawn raid, they shot and bludgeoned to death ten people, including men, women and children. One girl was spared by the militia group and taken back to Geelong where she was lived for a while but was later found dead next to a garden fence in Drysdale. Smythe had previous experience in massacres of Aboriginal people, being involved in the Pinjarra massacre in Western Australia. Additionally, Smythe's brother, Henry Wilson Hutchinson Smythe, was at the time the Commissioner of Crown Lands and head of the Border Police for the Murray District.

=== Macleay ===
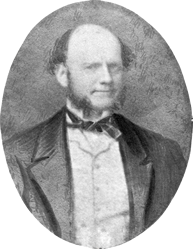
Robert George Massie

This district was enacted in 1842 with Henry Robert Oakes being appointed the Commissioner of Crown Lands and Border Police. Oakes was previously commissioner for the Port Macquarie district which became redundant with the formation of the Macleay and Clarence squatting districts. The Macleay District extended from just south of the Macleay River to just south of the Clarence River of coastal New South Wales. Oakes died not long after this appointment and was replaced by Robert George Massie. Massie shifted the headquarters and Border Police barracks from the fledgling town of Kempsey to a place five kilometres further upriver next to a natural ford on the Macleay River. This place was and is known as Belgrave Falls near to the modern-day community of Aldavilla. Massie's initial operations in late 1842 were organising licences in the cedar logging trade and pursuing escaped convicts.

Massie and his troopers were also active in operations to capture two Aboriginal men connected with the murder of between 8–10 men. The mission to seize an Aboriginal man called Fowler resulted in him and two others being taken prisoner. The raid also resulted in the shooting deaths of several of Fowler's kin. In 1845, Massie and his contingent of Border Police with the assistance of local armed colonists such as John McMaugh, tracked down a group of Aboriginal people believed to be responsible for killing two shepherds and their wives at Kunderang. A "great number of blacks were killed" during this operation.

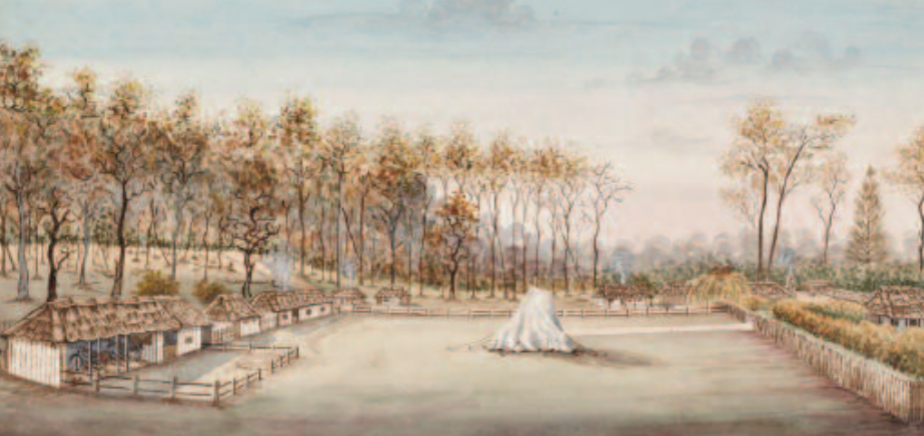
Border Police barracks at Belgrave Falls

=== Clarence ===
This district came into existence in 1842 and consisted of the coastal region around the Clarence River and the Richmond River. The first Commissioner of Crown Lands and head of Border Police for this region was Oliver Fry and his headquarters were at Red Rock near to the junction of the Orara River and Clarence River. He was previously assistant commissioner for the Liverpool Plains district and was considered suited to the profession after capturing and killing members of the Scotchie bushranging gang while working as a sheep station manager near Crookwell. Fry and his troopers were active in the Richmond River area, apprehending Aboriginal people for stealing sheep. By 1845, eight people had been murdered by Aboriginal people and during a rencontre, a member of the Border Police was nearly killed. Also in that year, Fry and his troopers shot 16 Aboriginal people along the Boyd River as summary punishment for the spearing death of a shepherd at Newton Boyd. In 1846, Fry's force teamed up with Robert Massie's Border Police on the Macleay River in an attempt to capture a well-known bushranger named Wilson. They failed in their quest and Wilson was shot a few months later by troopers of the New South Wales Mounted Police. Battles with local Aboriginal people seemed to have tapered off around this time, with Fry ceding some time to arresting shepherds for attempting to rape young girls and setting dogs onto local native people. By 1848, the Border Police had largely been disbanded in the Clarence District, but Fry still had at least one trooper working for him while investigating the mass poisoning deaths of 23 Aboriginal people at Kangaroo Creek in 1847. The owner of this run, Thomas Coutts, was arrested by Fry for this mass-murder and a previous incident where he shot at least one Aboriginal. Coutts was sent to Sydney for trial but the case was dropped after he was bailed for a large amount of money. Oliver Fry's involvement in the European colonisation of the region is recognised in the naming of Oliver Street and Fry Street in Grafton.

=== Moreton Bay ===
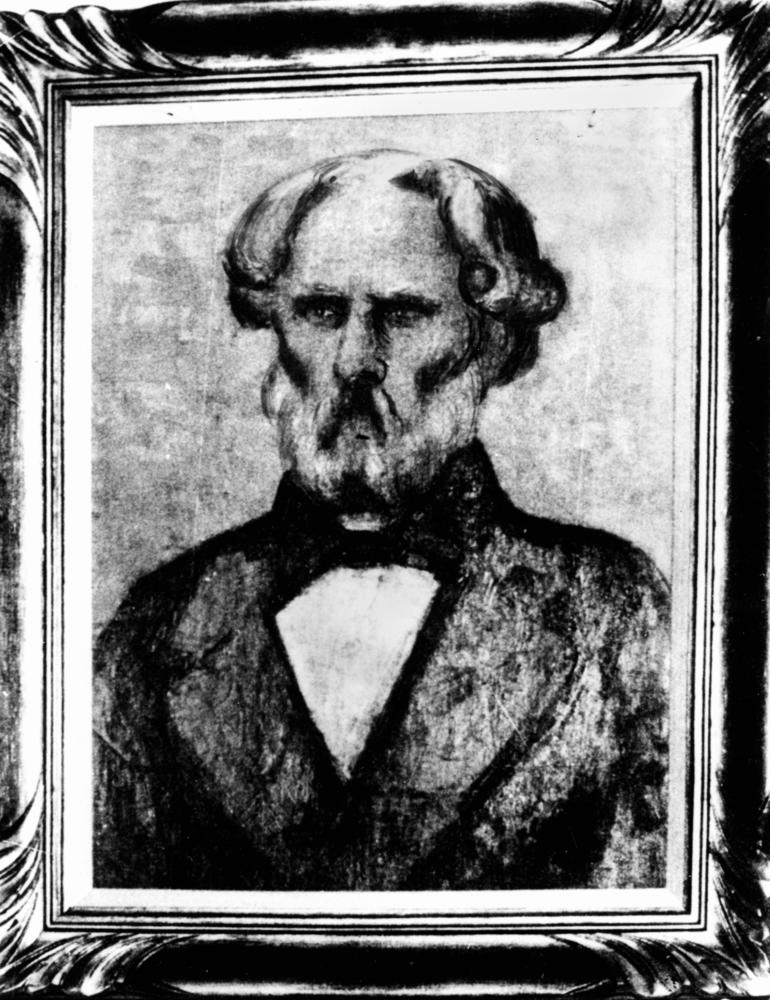
Dr Stephen Simpson

This district was created in 1842 and consisted of the coastal area from the Tweed River to the region north of the Brisbane River. Dr Stephen Simpson was the first Commissioner of Crown Lands and head of the Border Police for this district. Simpson was an ex-soldier who became a student and practitioner of the pseudoscience of homeopathy, pioneering its advancement in England. The methodology failed to take on, and Simpson travelled to New South Wales and was appointed colonial surgeon at the penal settlement of Moreton Bay in 1841. The following year he became Commissioner of Crown Lands for the newly created Moreton Bay squatting district.

Until February 1843 Simpson was also the acting chief administrator of the settlement of Moreton Bay (Brisbane) and it wasn't until this date that he was able to establish his commissioner headquarters and Border Police station at Woogaroo on the Brisbane River. In March 1843, Simpson and his troopers blazed the first colonial road from Moreton Bay to the mouth of the Mary River. The first major operation of the Moreton Bay Border Police against the local native population was in September 1843 in a skirmish which has come to be known as the Battle of One Tree Hill. Yugara people led by Moppy and Multuggerah had pushed back against settler encroachment into the Lockyer Valley by raiding squatting properties, killing shepherds, robbing drays and blocking the main road connecting Moreton Bay with the Darling Downs. Local squatters in the region, unable to control the resistance, petitioned the colonial government for military aid. In response to these requests, the colonial government assembled a large expeditionary force, which included Simpson and his troopers, the Border Police from the Darling Downs district under Christopher Rolleston as well as soldiers from the 99th Regiment of Foot and armed settlers. The Yugara retreated to Mount Davidson near the present locality of Blanchview from where they were able to repulse several attacks by rolling large rocks down towards the expeditionary force. However, the hill was eventually stormed by the expeditionary force, killing numerous Yugara and taking an immense number of spears and tools. Several Yugara encampments in the era were later destroyed, and a sentry of soldiers was established at Soldier's Flat (two miles from the modern-day town of Helidon) to prevent any further attacks on the road. Aboriginal resistance continued in the area and Simpson's troopers were also kept busy arresting bushrangers and investigating assaults and non-payment of wages of Indian coolie labourers working in the district.

In 1846, Simpson and his troopers were involved in attempts to capture Aboriginal people who had committed murders. In January, the well-known pastoral squatter John Uhr was killed by Yugara at Fernvale. Simpson's Border Police as well as soldiers and groups of armed pastoralists made endeavours to capture the murderers. In September, Aboriginal people attacked a pastoralist and in self defence he shot dead the ringleader who was assumed of being involved in the Uhr killing, and in November the Border Police imprisoned another two as suspected accessories. Also in that month, colonist Andrew Gregor and his maid Mary Shannon were bludgeoned to death by members of the Ningi Ningi clan near the Pine River. The government offered financial rewards for the capture of people suspected to be involved in the killings. Simpson's troopers captured one Aboriginal man named Constable, while officers of the general police and assigned convicts shot and killed other suspects. By 1849, with the introduction of the Native Police force, the Border Police was phased out in the Moreton Bay District.

=== Darling Downs ===
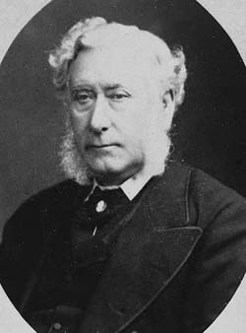
Christopher Rolleston

This squatting district was officially gazetted in 1843 and the first Commissioner of Crown Lands was Christopher Rolleston. He set up his headquarters and Border Police barracks at Cambooya on the Eton Vale squatting run of Arthur Hodgson. Commissioner George MacDonald had previously used this site as an outpost for his Border Police force when the area was still part of the New England District. Rolleston was on very amicable terms with the prominent squatters in the district. Rolleston let Arthur Hodgson be acting commissioner while he was on leave, and he later married the sister of the famous squatter Patrick Leslie. Hodgson and Leslie in return were sure that Rolleston and his troopers would "teach these sable gentleman that their recent outrages will not escape unpunished", and they were soon involved the large punitive expedition against Aboriginal people in the Battle of One Tree Hill. Rolleston's troopers were also active in hunting down convict runaways and deserters from the British Army. In 1845, Rolleston reported that the squatters had allowed Aboriginal people let them back on the sheep stations. Rolleston's Border Police were mostly disbanded in 1847 and was left to small groups of constabulary.

=== Gippsland ===
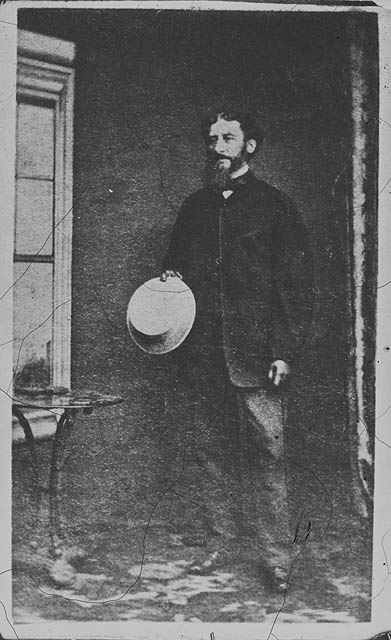
Charles Tyers

The district of Gippsland was declared in 1843 and encompassed the area east of the Western Port district and south of the Maneroo district. The first Commissioner of Crown Lands for this region was Charles James Tyers. After attempting to reach Gippsland through what was once extensive bushland east of Melbourne, Tyers had to retreat back to Melbourne and sail to the area's only township in Port Albert, arriving in January 1844. A road to Gippsland was opened a few weeks later by Frederick Armand Powlett, the commissioner for the Western Port District. Tyers made camp at Old Port and ordered his troopers to burn down any unlicensed buildings around the township. Tyers eventually established his main Border Police barracks at Eagle Point and was frequently called upon to lead punitive expeditions against Aboriginal people in the district. The first of these was along the La Trobe River against the Braiakaulung people. Tyers, together with Powlett, troopers of the Border Police and Native Police, and several armed colonists including Angus McMillan, surprised and shot up a camp of Aboriginal people. In 1845, Tyers had authority over both the Border Police and Native Police troopers in the region, and again utilised them and the settlers in armed excursions against the native population in the Lake Wellington area. Further punitive expeditions were conducted throughout 1846 and 1847, resulting in massacres along the Macalister River, Snowy River, and around Boisdale and Bushy Park. Additional killings by these forces occurred during the operations to find a supposed white woman taken prisoner by local Aboriginal people. The reports proved to be false but Tyers estimated that at least 50 native people had been shot dead as a result of the assertive attempts to find the fictional damsel in distress. By 1848, reports mentioning the Border Police appear to diminish, indicating their decommissioning in the Gippsland district.

=== Murray ===
The squatting district of Murray was created in 1843 and the first Commissioner of Crown Lands for this region was Henry Wilson Hutchinson Smythe. H.W.H. Smythe was the brother-in-law of William Lonsdale and had previously been employed as a colonial surveyor working in regions uncharted to the British with people such as Foster Fyans. The Murray District consisted of the area between the Murray River and the Goulburn River. Smythe set up his headquarters and Border Police barracks at Benalla. In 1843 and 1844, Smythe with his troopers and a section of Native Police under Henry Dana conducted a series of punitive expeditions along the lower Goulburn River to the junction with the Murray River and up to the Edward River. A squatter recalled one particular incident where troopers of the Border Police captured and chained an Aboriginal man who was a member of a tribe that has stolen a large number of sheep and a carbine from a shepherd. They forced him to lead the force to the rest of his tribe but when the man attempted to escape he was shot dead by the troopers. The recollections also reveal how local armed squatters would participate in the raids. In 1847, an Aboriginal man by the name of "Gentleman Jemmy" arrested by Smythe's troopers officially voiced that his "original rights" to the land overrode any legislation imposed by the colonial authorities. By the end of the decade the force in this district had become defunct. H.W.H. Smythe drowned in the Broken River in 1853.

=== Gwydir ===
This district was formed out of the northern section of the Liverpool Plains District in 1847 and included the region around the Gwydir River. The first Commissioner of Crown Lands for this district was Richard John Bligh. Bligh was the grandson of Vice-Admiral William Bligh and the brother of John O'Connell Bligh who later became a commandant of the Native Police. Richard John Bligh is also the great-great-grandfather of Anna Bligh, the former Premier of Queensland.

== See also ==
- New South Wales Police Force
