= George James MacDonald (public servant) =

British civil servant and war criminal

George James MacDonald (12 May 1805 − 21 December 1851) was a Commissioner of Crown Lands in the British colony of New South Wales where he founded both the city of Armidale and the town of Balranald. He is mostly remembered for his role in leading a contingent of Border Police troopers in a large massacre of Indigenous Australians in the Clarence River region. MacDonald was also considered a talented linguist and writer, producing several published works of poetry and prose reflecting on his experiences in Australia.

== Early life ==
MacDonald was born in Holborn, London on 12 May 1805. He was the eldest son of Major James MacDonald of the British Army and was educated at Blundell's School in Tiverton, Devon. In his early 20s, he emigrated to New South Wales, arriving in 1826. He lived at a property called Bernera near Liverpool, New South Wales about 30 kilometres to the south-west of Sydney.

== Port Macquarie ==
In 1828, MacDonald was appointed to the position of clerk of stores with the commissariat at the penal colony of Port Macquarie on the north coast of New South Wales, organising supplies to the British regiment stationed there. He was posted to the agricultural outpost of this settlement, a place known as Rolland Plains. Here he became familiar with the local Ngambaa people, learning both their language and customs. MacDonald was able to gain their trust through the fact that he had a deformity on his back similar to a recently deceased member of the clan known as Bangar. MacDonald was regarded as a type of reincarnation of this person. He had a relationship with a Ngambaa woman named Maria who gave birth to a daughter named Georgina after MacDonald had left the settlement. The daughter died not long after being born.

In 1830, MacDonald was chosen to lead a group of 12 armed Aboriginal men which included the well-known Aboriginal tracker Bob Barrett as a non-commissioned officer. This paramilitary force was to be sent to Tasmania to fight against the Aboriginal people there in the Black War. However, the colonial authorities disbanded the unit before it was deployed.

== Sydney ==
In 1830, Port Macquarie started to be wound down as a penal settlement and MacDonald was recalled to Sydney. Over the next few years he was appointed to various clerical positions including one at the Parramatta Female Factory in 1833.

== Punitive expedition to the Williams River ==
In the mid 1830s, the Gringai people who lived in the valleys and hills around the Williams River to the north of Newcastle, were at war with the British invaders. Land and women were being stolen from the male members of the clan and shepherds and stock of the British squatters in the area were being speared and killed. In one particular incident five shepherds of Robert Mackenzie were killed by the Gringai. Although troopers of the New South Wales Mounted Police and armed employees from the nearby landholdings of the Australian Agricultural Company were deployed to punish the tribespeople, it was deemed insufficient to crush their resistance. Therefore, in 1835 Richard Bourke, Governor of New South Wales, authorised the deployment of 50 soldiers from the 17th Regiment of the British Army based in Sydney to undertake a punitive expedition against the Gringai.

MacDonald, due to his previous experience at Port Macquarie, was appointed as chief commissariat and interpreter to the natives for this military operation which was commanded by Major William Croker. Although the directive to the soldiers was to vigorously suppress the resistance, it is unclear exactly what happened during the mission. Croker's men returned to Sydney after a month in the Williams River area but reports of the operation seem to not exist. Follow up raids by armed settlers led by James McIntyre of the Australian Agricultural Company resulted in the capture of a Gringai man named Charley who was later hanged at Dungog for the murders of the five shepherds.

== Commissioner of Crown Lands ==
In late 1837, MacDonald was appointed as a Commissioner of Crown Lands. This position involved monitoring and policing the uptake of crown land by the pastoralist squatters. In 1839, he was assigned to the New England district and received an attachment of eight troopers of the Border Police to aid in enforcing the dispossession of land from the Aboriginal population. Later that year, MacDonald set up his headquarters on a grassy plain which he called Armidale after the ancestral home of the MacDonald clan at Armadale in Scotland. The settlement at Armidale later became one of the biggest towns in the region. Soon after establishing his lodgings, MacDonald set out on a punitive expedition against a group of Aboriginal people led by a man labelled "Anti-Christ" but was unable to locate them. Local pastoralists expected MacDonald and his troopers to "drive these murderous savages from this quarter and...make an example of some of them."

The New England district at this time did not have a set northern boundary and MacDonald was often patrolling areas as far north as Moreton Bay. In 1841, MacDonald and his troopers were involved in a large massacre of Aboriginal people at the junction of the Clarence River and the Orara River. In an early morning raid, an Aboriginal campsite near the riverbank was attacked by his Border Police resulting in many casualties, the bodies of some apparently floating downriver past "The Settlement", now known as South Grafton. The massacre was inflicted as punishment for the theft of materials from Dr John Dobie's Ramornie station.

Around this time, MacDonald's relationship with a woman named Sophia Docker, to whom he was engaged, fell apart. Docker had accepted the advances of Edward Darvall, a captain in the Bengal Native Infantry and ceased her engagement to MacDonald. MacDonald challenged Darvall to a duel on the North Shore of Sydney in which they fired shots at each other but neither was hurt.

With MacDonald being absent from the New England district on a regular basis, the local squatters were often left to their own devices to arrange punitive missions against Aboriginal people. The squatters also resented the fact that MacDonald wasn't assigned a flogger to scourge their convict servants as summary punishment for disobedience.

MacDonald continued as the Commissioner of Crown Lands in New England until 1848, when he was transferred to be the commissioner in the Lower Darling district. In the winter of 1848, MacDonald made his way to his new district in the far southwest of the colony. He established his headquarters on the banks of the Murrumbidgee River about 30 kilometres downstream of its junction with the Lachlan River. He named this place Balranald after another of the MacDonald clan's ancestral homes in northern Scotland. Balranald became an important township in the region.

== Death ==
The Lower Darling district was an immense and arid area to patrol. MacDonald's health soon began to give way and in 1851 he found it necessary to travel to Melbourne for a period of convalescence. He journeyed as far as Yungera where he died suddenly on 21 December 1851.

== Poetry ==
MacDonald wrote several works of poetry and prose mostly during the 1820s and 1830s. They were published in newspapers and periodicals and were well received. The subject matter of his compositions included Aboriginal Australians, nature, composers of classical music, and his own colonial experiences.
