= George Gipps =

British colonial administrator (1790–1847)

Lieutenant-Colonel Sir George Gipps
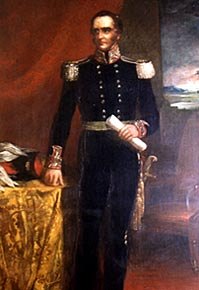

9th Governor of New South Wales
- In office 5 October 1837 – 2 August 1846
- Monarch: Victoria
- Preceded by: Richard Bourke
- Succeeded by: Charles Augustus FitzRoy

Personal details
- Born: 23 December 1790 Ringwould, Kent, England
- Died: 28 February 1847 (aged 56) Canterbury
- Spouse: Elizabeth Ramsay
- Children: Reginald Ramsay Gipps
- Education: The King's School, Canterbury, and Royal Military Academy
- Profession: Military engineer

Sir George Gipps (23 December 1790 – 28 February 1847) was the Governor of the British Colony of New South Wales for eight years, between 1838 and 1846. His governorship oversaw a tumultuous period when the rights to land were bitterly contested in a three way struggle between the colonial government, Aboriginal people and wealthy graziers known as squatters. The management of other major issues such as the end of convict transportation, large immigration programs and the introduction of majority elected representation also featured strongly during his tenure. Gipps is regarded as having brought a high moral and intellectual standard to the position of governor, but was ultimately defeated in his aims by the increasing power and avarice of the squatters.

== Early life ==
Gipps was born in December 1790 at Ringwould, Kent, England, the son of Rev George Gipps and Susannah Bonella Venn. Both his parents were from wealthy families, with his maternal grandfather having been an estate and slave owner in Jamaica. He was educated at The King's School, Canterbury, and at the Royal Military Academy, Woolwich.

== Peninsular War ==
In 1809 he joined the Royal Engineers and was initially posted to Ireland before being transferred in 1811 to serve in the Peninsular War. Gipps took part in the Siege of Badajoz in 1812 where he was wounded in the arm leading an assault on the fort of La Picurina. He was deployed to other cities in Spain as well as elsewhere in Europe (although he missed the Battle of Waterloo due to his posting in Ostend, Belgium where he was preparing fortifications).

== West Indies ==
In 1824 he joined the Colonial Service and served in the West Indies, where he was appointed as Commander of Engineers in the colonies of Demerara and Berbice. Gipps was in charge of the construction of public works and had control over a few hundred slaves who were utilised as labourers. He proposed a scheme of removing these labourers from slavery after their work for the government had ceased. However, a minor scandal surfaced. Gipps fathered a child to his slave mistress named Louisa, after which he attempted to purchase her freedom. This scandal prevented the implementation of his plan. This caused an embarrassment to Gipps who returned to England in 1829. He married Elizabeth Ramsay, the daughter of Major-General George Ramsay, RA, in 1830.

== Lower Canada ==
After a few years serving as a commanding engineer for the government in the town of Sheerness, Gipps became Private Secretary to the First Lord of the Admiralty, Lord Auckland in 1834. A year later, on Auckland's recommendation, Gipps was knighted and sent to Lower Canada as a Commissioner, together with the Earl of Gosford and Sir Charles Edward Grey, to examine grievances against colonial rule there. Although the commission was a complete failure which helped to ignite the 1837 Lower Canada Rebellion, Gipps gained a reputation for political negotiation and colonial administration. On returning to England in April 1837, he found that he was promoted to the rank of major and was being considered for the role of Governor of New South Wales. He accepted and was officially appointed to the position on 5 October 1837.

== Governor of New South Wales ==
Gipps arrived in Sydney aboard the Upton Castle in February 1838. He entered into the colony at one of its most turbulent periods during which drought, economic depression, cessation of convict transportation, frontier conflict with Aboriginal people, the rise of semi-elective government, and bitter contests with powerful squatters over land seizure would all create immense difficulties for him. Gipps' salary of £5,000 a year, the highest in the Empire for a colonial governor, was to be hard earned. In 1841 he threatened to ban football in Sydney if the playing of the game continued to flout Sunday observance standards.

=== Policies toward Aboriginal people ===
When Gipps arrived in 1838, he was immediately faced with the issue of two major massacres of Aboriginal people: the Waterloo Creek massacre perpetrated by Major James Nunn and his detachment of New South Wales Mounted Police, and the Myall Creek massacre perpetrated by squatter John Henry Fleming and his ten stockmen.

The British government at this time was interested in reducing the exterminatory effects of colonisation on Indigenous peoples, and in 1837 a select committee had produced a report suggesting ways to do this. As Governor, Gipps was obligated by this report at least to attempt to protect Aboriginals under his jurisdiction. He ordered inquiries into both incidents with the Myall Creek massacre inquiry resulting in a judicial trial that saw seven stockmen being sentenced to death and hanged for the massacre. Although these actions upheld Gipps in the eyes of those concerned for Indigenous protection, the powerful squatters marked him as a dangerous enemy who interfered with their acquisition of vast tracts of Aboriginal land.

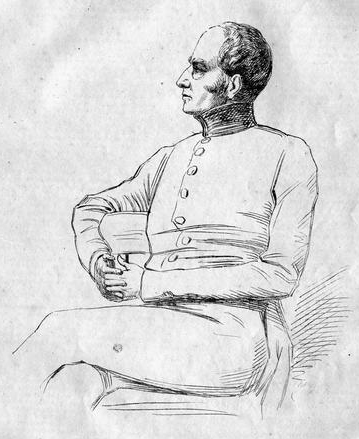
Sir George Gipps

Gipps attempted twice to introduce legislation that allowed for Aboriginal evidence to be given in the courts. In 1839, an Act was passed in the NSW legislature but was later vetoed by the British government. In 1844, Gipps tried again but the proposed Aboriginal Evidence Bill was defeated by the squatters in the NSW Legislative Council.

Additionally, the British government requested Gipps to oversee the introduction of an Aboriginal Protectorate in the Port Phillip District of the colony. Although it provided important documentary evidence of widespread abuses toward Aboriginal people, the Protectorate suffered from under-funding and financial mismanagement. Despite strong pressure from the squatters in the region to disband the scheme, Gipps kept it going during his time as governor. It failed, however, in providing protection to the Aboriginal people.

=== Land managements ===
One of Gipps' major tasks was to try to bring some control over the "squattocracy" spreading outside the "boundaries of location" and to minimise conflict between them and the Aboriginal people who resided in these lands. In 1839, Gipps amended an Act brought in by Governor Richard Bourke three years earlier that attempted to restrain the unauthorised occupation of Crown Lands. Gipps' amendment allowed for the formation of the Border Police of New South Wales, which were paramilitary units controlled by various Commissioners of Crown Lands that enabled the enforcement of the land laws in the frontier regions. The Border Police were also meant to control the violence between the squatters and Aboriginals, but in reality this force were often utilised to kill Aboriginal people in large numbers.

Further to this, in April 1844 Gipps introduced legislation that expanded the annual licensing fee for squatters, demanding £10 a year for every station they had taken up. Each property was to be limited to 20 square miles (52 km^{2}) with no more than 500 head of cattle and 7000 sheep. Although the bill also allowed for a longer term 8 year tenancy of a small part of each property, the squatters were infuriated by these restrictions. This storm of protest from the squatters led to the foundation of the Pastoral Association of New South Wales and added to the already toxic resentment felt toward Gipps by the wealthy colonists which continued until his departure.

=== Expansion of the colony ===
Despite Gipps' attempts to rein in the squatters, the expansion of the frontiers of British colonisation increased dramatically under his governorship. The Moreton Bay region (later known as Brisbane) and the Darling Downs were opened up to the colonists in the north, while the Portland Bay District in the south was quickly overrun with graziers. Gipps was commemorated during this period of growth through the naming of Gippsland in 1840. This acceleration of invasion of Aboriginal lands led to even more frontier conflict and massacres during the early 1840s. After feeling the wrath of the squatters around the Myall Creek affair, Gipps was no longer willing or able to make a meaningful intervention into the violence. Well connected colonists and squatters such as Angus McMillan, Patrick Leslie and Arthur Hodgson were in large part a law unto themselves in how they took up land and how they dealt with the Aboriginal residents.

=== New Zealand ===
In 1839, two groups of British colonists had been attempting to acquire large amounts of land in New Zealand by duping the resident Māori people. The New Zealand Company, led by Edward Gibbon Wakefield, and a consortium of Sydney speculators led by William Wentworth, had each laid claim to around 8 million hectares which amounted to nearly two thirds of the entire New Zealand land mass. The British government wished to prevent this transaction and declared sovereignty over New Zealand, altering Gipps' jurisdiction as governor by Letters Patent to include both the territory of New South Wales and New Zealand.

In 1840, Gipps proclaimed all previous and future land purchases in New Zealand invalid unless they were approved by the Crown. The Treaty of Waitangi was completed soon after, which induced the Māori to cede their lands without reservation to the Crown. Gipps openly accused Wentworth of a massive fraud in his attempts to acquire huge tracts of New Zealand land from the Māori. This heightened the fierce enmity between the squatters and Gipps, with Wentworth, a leading member of the "squattocracy", swearing "eternal vengeance" against Gipps for his interference.

Most of the administration in New Zealand was carried out by Lieutenant-Governor William Hobson, while Gipps retained control only of matters to do with the Imperial Prerogative. This arrangement ended in May 1841, when New Zealand became a Crown Colony in its own right.

He advanced to the regimental rank of lieutenant colonel on 23 November 1841.

=== Elected representation ===
In 1842, the British government passed the Constitution Act for New South Wales. This act allowed, for the first time, elected representatives to outnumber those nominated by the Crown in the Legislative Council of New South Wales. The following year, Gipps implemented the changes with him nominating 12 members, and another 24 being elected by eligible land-holding male citizens of the colony. Although these changes seemed to increase democratic governance in New South Wales, it in fact markedly increased the influence of the wealthy land-holding squatters due to the prerequisite of owning at least £2,000 worth of land in order to be a candidate.

Although Gipps still had the power of veto, this new legislature almost entirely extinguished his ability to restrain the squatters. Elected squatters such as William Wentworth, Robert Lowe, Hannibal Macarthur, Richard Windeyer and William Foster attacked Gipps consistently for his land policies that worked against their exclusive claims on property beyond the settled areas, previously the domain solely of their Indigenous inhabitants. When Gipps was removed from the governorship in 1846, he and his appointees on the Council were the last obstacles to the squatters, who were then able to pass favourable pastoral leasing laws that increased the security of their claims and entrenched their power and wealth for at least the next fifty years.

=== Immigration and the end of convict transportation ===
In the late 1830s the British criminal system was undergoing major reform and as a result, transportation of convicts to mainland New South Wales ceased in 1840. These convicts provided slave labour for the squatters, some of whom like James Macarthur and Benjamin Boyd tried to replace them with cheap Chinese and Indian coolie or blackbirded Pacific Islander labourers. Gipps was indifferent to these ideas and instead promoted the program of paying British and German people to emigrate to the colony. Gipps presided over the implementation of this scheme and, influenced by the pro-immigration colonist John Dunmore Lang, funded it through revenue acquired by the sale of Crown Lands.

Although many squatters disliked Gipps' scheme because it collected tax off them and resulted in more expensive workers, Gipps was successful in transforming the penal colony toward a free society of worker immigrants with the European population of New South Wales nearly doubling to 190,000 people by 1846.

=== Drought and economic depression ===
From Gipps' arrival in the colony there was a devastating three-year drought, which resulted in the economic depression of the early 1840s. Wool prices and land values plummeted while unemployment rose and graziers went bankrupt. Financial institutions such as the Bank of Australia, failed and many colonists lost their fortunes. Revenues to fund policies such as the assisted migration scheme dried up and Gipps was forced to borrow large amounts of money to finance government spending. The drought ended in 1843 and the economic recovery was assisted by the new profitable industry of boiling down, where excess livestock were killed, cut up and placed in huge boiling vats to make tallow.

=== Education in the colony ===
Gipps was a vociferous advocate for a secular government school system and wished to improve the situation in the colony where in 1844 fewer than half of the children received any form of education, whether public or private. With the Attorney-General John Plunkett, Gipps proposed a strong public school system to be funded alongside the denominational system. Although their plan was unresolved during Gipps' tenure, it paved the way for the passing of the National Education Board Act of 1848. This Act established the secular public school system that exists today in New South Wales.

== Return to England ==
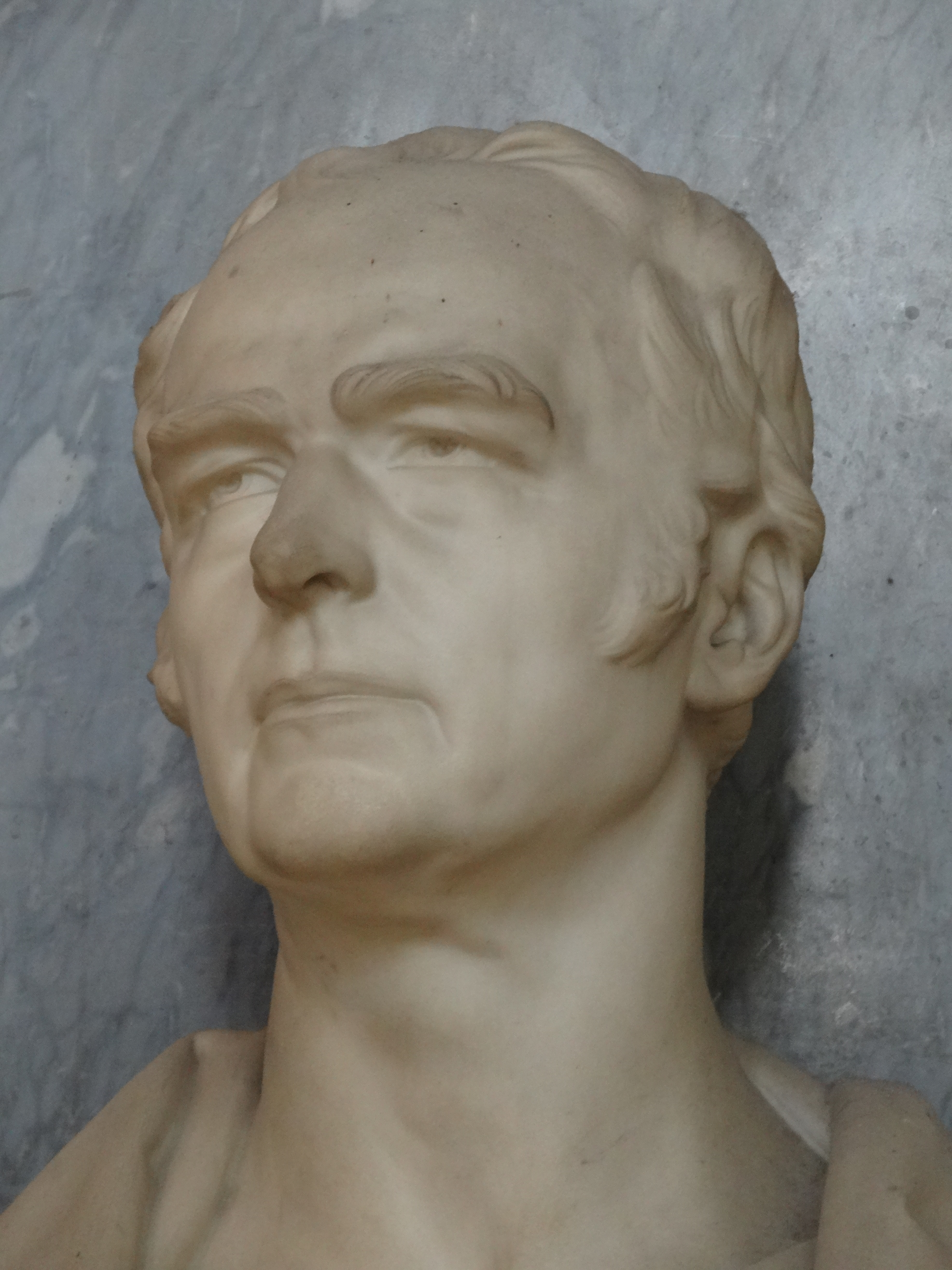
George Gipps memorial, Canterbury Cathedral

While being extremely conscientious and fair-dealing in his governorship, Gipps' health was broken down by overwork and the constant invective from the squatters. His appointment had been extended for another two years after the original six, due to the high regard the Colonial Office held him in. By the end of this term, Gipps was troubled by breathing difficulties, the cause of which was being misdiagnosed as asthma by colonial doctors. Gipps did not wait for his successor, Charles Augustus FitzRoy, to arrive, departing Sydney in July 1846 in poor health. He arrived in England that November, and died at Canterbury of a massive heart attack on 28 February 1847.

== Legacy ==
Gipps and his wife had a son, Reginald Ramsay Gipps, who later became a general in the British Army.

Gippsland was named in Gipps' honour by his close friend the explorer Paweł Edmund Strzelecki. He is also commemorated by Gipps Street, Waverley, NSW; Gipps Street, Wellington, New Zealand; Gipps Street, Barton, ACT; and Gipps Street, East Melbourne, Victoria. There are several streets in suburban Sydney named after Gipps.

== See also ==
- Governor of New South Wales
- Governor-General of New Zealand
- William Hobson
- Gippsland
- Historical Records of Australia

Government offices
Preceded by Richard Bourke	Governor of New South Wales; 1838–1846	Succeeded by Sir Charles FitzRoy
