= Charles Tyers =

Anglo-Australian surveyor and explorer

Captain Charles Tyers
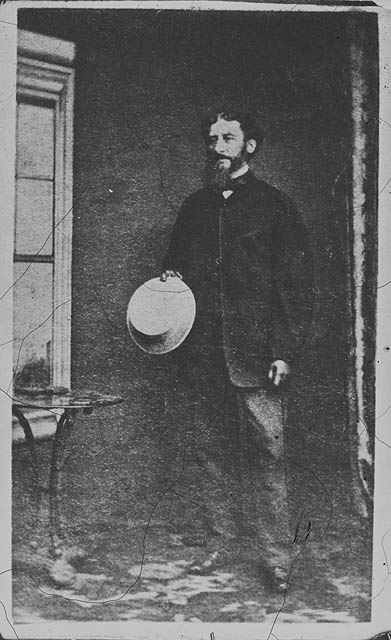
- Captain Charles J. Tyers, reproduced from the National Library of Australia
- Born: 13 September 1806; London, England
- Died: 20 September 1870 (aged 64); Melbourne, Victoria, Australia
- Occupations: Surveyor, explorer, and Commissioner of Crown Lands
- Spouse: Georgina Caroline (m. 1849)
- Parent(s): John Tyers and Elizabeth (née Theobald)

Captain Charles James Tyers (13 September 1806 – 20 September 1870) was a 19th-century Anglo-Australian surveyor and explorer, and the Commissioner of Crown Lands for Portland (1842–1843) and Gippsland (1844–1867).

There are many Australian geographical features named after him, including Tyers, Tyers Junction, Western Tyers, Tyers River, Mount Tyers, and Lake Tyers. His many achievements include the surveying and naming of Port Essington (1839), the determination of the border between South Australia and Victoria, naming the Baw Baw plateau, and being the first European (in 1841) to climb Mount Emu and Mount Buninyong in the Western District of Victoria.

== Background and early career ==
Tyers was born in London, the son of John Tyers and his wife Elizabeth née Theobald.

After an education at Christ's Hospital he entered the navy in 1828. He served under Admiral Lord Lyons on the Blonde and Captain Bremer on the Alligator. He made a study of marine surveying and computed longitudes in the Channel, Mediterranean, West Indies and South Africa becoming recognised as an expert and in 1837 he was commissioned to survey the Port Essington area of northern Australia. He reached the rank of captain, but before he was given a command he left the navy in 1839 to join the colonial service.

== Surveyor ==
Following the establishment of the colony of South Australia in 1836, the region between the coast and the Murray River was rapidly being settled by squatters selecting large runs for sheep grazing. With no clear border legal oversight was impossible. An accurate border needed to be defined.

In 1839 Tyers was transferred from the Royal Navy to the Colonial Service and was appointed as a government surveyor. He was instructed to ascertain the precise longitude at the mouth of the Glenelg River so that a distance to the 141st meridian (the eastern border) could be measured.

On 1 October 1839 Tyers arrived in Melbourne from Sydney on the Pyramus. He set about assembling his party which was to include Thomas Scott Townsend, Assistant Surveyor, seven convicts and his private servant, also a dray, nine bullocks and two packhorses. His equipment included a 3 1/2 inches (8.9 cm) theodolite, for astronomical work a sextant, a compass and circumferentor and two sets of surveying chains. He used three methods for surveying: chronometric measurements from Sydney, triangulation from Melbourne and lunar observations from Portland.

He set out westwards for Portland on 13 October 1840 into what was uncharted and largely unknown territory. He crossed the Moorabool River north of Geelong near Buckley's Falls. Then proceeded to cross the Nuriwillum or Lea River. The use of aboriginal names for geographical features was a notable feature throughout his surveying career; European toponyms have superseded most of them. He then went north of Lake Corangamite and Lake Colac which he named and ascended Derrinallum or Mount Elephant twenty miles to the west on the 26th. Unable to directly go to Portland because of swampy country, he then continued northwest towards Gariwerd or the Grampians. On the 29th he ascended Dooroobdoorabul or Mount Shadwell and a day later Mount Rouse. Further thwarted by swampy land he headed north to Wiribcot or Mount Abrupt at the southern end of the Grampians which he ascended on 6 November. From here he was able to avoid difficult country by heading south and arrived at Portland on 14 November where he was accommodated and welcomed by Edward Henty.

On an expanse of sandy beach he formed a broad arrow with limestone rocks. This became known as Tyers' Mark and was used to determine the starting point for the border survey. Due to primarily inadequate equipment this was later determined to be 2-mile and 4 chains (3.30 km) in error leading to the South Australia-Victoria border dispute.

== Commissioner for Crown Lands for Gippsland ==
The newly appointed Commissioner of Crown Lands Tyers arrived in Gippsland in early 1844, and was soon involved in legal, moral and cultural problems of a different sort than what he found in Werten District the year before. On 11 February 1844, he notes in his diary:

"I issued orders to both the border police and the blacks not to fire except in self defence – but to rush upon them and take them by surprise. When approaching the scrub however in line – one of the party fired and was followed by the whole. The natives being taken by surprise fled though the scrub – leaving everything behind them."

Some time later a boating party on the Gippsland Lakes, which included Tyers, was searching for a spot to land to gather dry sticks. A local grazier Dunderdale records:

when it [the boat] neared the land the air was filled with a stench so horrible that Mr. Tyers at once put the boat about, and went away in another direction. Next day he visited the spot with his police, and he found that the dead wood covered a large pile of corpses of the natives shot by his own black troopers, and he directed them to make it a holocaust.

The worst killing during Tyers' period happened on a tributary of the Snowy River between today's Orbost and Marlo. Native Police were involved, including some Western Port blacks, traditional enemies of the Kurnai. Commissioner Tyers reported: "At least fifty [Aborigines] were killed by the native police and other aborigines attached to the parties in search of a white woman."

Policemen Dan and Walsh, under Tyers' command were reported to be culpable, a local grazier Warman in his journal records "as long as such persons as Messrs W. Dana and Walsh are in command of the native police nothing can be done to stop their extermination for the native blacks are the most cruel blood thirsty wretches alive, and nothing gives them so much pleasure as shooting and tomahawking the defenceless savages".

Tyers was responsible for inaugurating government in Gippsland and virtually became 'King' of the huge isolated area, where lawlessness had been common and the Aboriginals hostile. He made a map showing holdings and their occupants and sent it to La Trobe in July 1844 with a descriptive and statistical report. He regulated the liquor trade and on his recommendations two police stations and a Court of Petty Sessions were established and two justices of the peace appointed. He improved Port Albert to cope with the growing trade with Hobart. He made extensive explorations of Gippsland, always making his land valuations after trigonometrical survey and collection of geological specimens. In 1846 he investigated the suitability of Gabo Island for a lighthouse. He was appointed a stipendiary magistrate in 1853. To this position was added that of warden of the Gippsland goldfields in 1861.

He moved from Old Port to Eagle Point, where in 1849 he married Georgina Caroline, sister of William Scott, a grazier at Swan Reach. Later he moved to Sale and then built a home, Seabank, at Old Port, where he retired in 1867. He died at Melbourne on 20 September 1870.
