= William Wright (Australian politician) =

Australian politician

William Henry Wright (1816 – 1 February 1877) was a British Army officer and politician in colonial Victoria (Australia), and a member of the Victorian Legislative Council.

== Early life ==
Wright was born in Sandhurst, Berkshire, England, to Colonel Charles Wright and Harriet, née Frere. In 1833, after officer training at the Royal Military College, Sandhurst, Wright served with the 50th Regiment in New Zealand and on Norfolk Island.

== Career in Australia ==
He sold his army commission in 1838 and trained as a surveyor in New South Wales. He joined the New South Wales Survey Department under Major Thomas Mitchell on 27 July 1838. Wright became Commissioner of Crown Lands for the Wellington District on 13 June 1843. In 1845, Wright ordered a number of troopers to deal with Aboriginal disturbances at the Macquarie Marshes and at Narromine. This force killed upwards of twenty people in these punitive expeditions. Thomas Mitchell travelled through this region about 12 months after the raids and described how most of the males of the tribe who lived in that area had been killed and many of the women taken to work as slaves on cattle stations.

In late 1846, Wright was transferred to be Commissioner of Crown Lands for the Wimmera district. He was appointed chief commissioner of the goldfields on 1 May 1852 by Lieutenant-Governor Charles La Trobe.

Wright appointed as a member of the Victorian Legislative Council on 29 August 1853 and held that position until the original Council was abolished in March 1856. Wright was later appointed a police magistrate in the Jamieson district. This position he retained until he was appointed secretary for railways on 29 July 1862. Wright acted in this latter capacity for a number of years, giving general satisfaction to the successive responsible heads of the department, and proving himself an efficient public officer. When the previous sheriff of Victoria, Claud Farie, died in 1871, Wright, by his own request, was appointed to the position, which he continued to hold up to the time of his death.

== Personal life ==
Wright married Mary Meek on 28 August 1866. He died in Brighton, Victoria at the home of George Higinbotham sometime on the morning of 1 February 1877 after dining there the previous night, and was buried in St Kilda Cemetery.

Victorian Legislative Council
New seat	Appointed Member; August 1853 – March 1856	Original Council abolished
