= Eagle Point, Victoria =

Eagle Point
- Town
- Interactive map of Eagle Point
- Coordinates: 37.8957697°S 147.661128°E
- Country: Australia
- State: Victoria
- LGA: Shire of East Gippsland
- Location: 12 km (7.5 mi) S of Bairnsdale; 80 km (50 mi) NE of Sale; 291 km (181 mi) E of Melbourne
- Established: late 1840s
- Elevation: 11 m (36 ft)

Population
  - Total: 1,094 (2016 census)
- Postcode: 3878
- Mean max temp: 20.7 °C (69.3 °F)
- Mean min temp: 8.7 °C (47.7 °F)
- Annual rainfall: 694.8 mm (27.35 in)

Eagle Point is a town in Victoria, Australia, in the Shire of East Gippsland, by Lake King. The area encompasses the red limestone cliffs by the Mitchell River and Mitchell River silt jetties. It is a popular tourist destination.

== History ==
The Gunai name for Eagle Point is Nurrung, which translates to moon.

Eagle Point is associated with conflict between the local Gunai Aboriginal people and settlers. In 1840-41, Angus McMillan and his men killed an unknown number of Gunai people in skirmishes during "the defense of Bushy Park". In the mid to late 1840s, Eagle Point was the headquarters for the Border Police under Commissioner Tyers. In conjunction with the Native Police force based at nearby Boisdale, this force conducted regular raids upon Gunai camps across the region.

== Demographics ==
The Australian Bureau of Statistics 2016 Census reported the town had a ratio of 51 males to 49 females. The median age was 56 years of age, 18 years above the Australian average.

=== Nationalities and Languages ===
At 79.2%, the majority of people living in Eagle Point were born in Australia. The other most common countries of birth were England, Germany, New Zealand, Netherlands and Scotland. In Eagle Point, 90.1% of people only spoke English at home. The percentage of Italian speakers was 0.8%, 0.7% spoke German, while Afrikaans, Finnish and Malay speakers each were 0.3%.

=== Religion ===
The town of Eagle Point is 63.1% religious, with 19.4% identifying as Anglican, 15.8% as Catholic and 4.8% as belonging to the Uniting Church. 36.9% of the population were reported as having no religion.

=== Relationship Status ===
59.1% of the population is married in Eagle Point, 19.4% have never married, 11.9% are divorced, 6.0% are widowed and 3.6% are separated.

=== Employment Status ===
51.0% of people living in Eagle Point are employed full-time, and 35.3% are working part-time. Eagle Point has an unemployment rate of 4.0%.

== Education ==
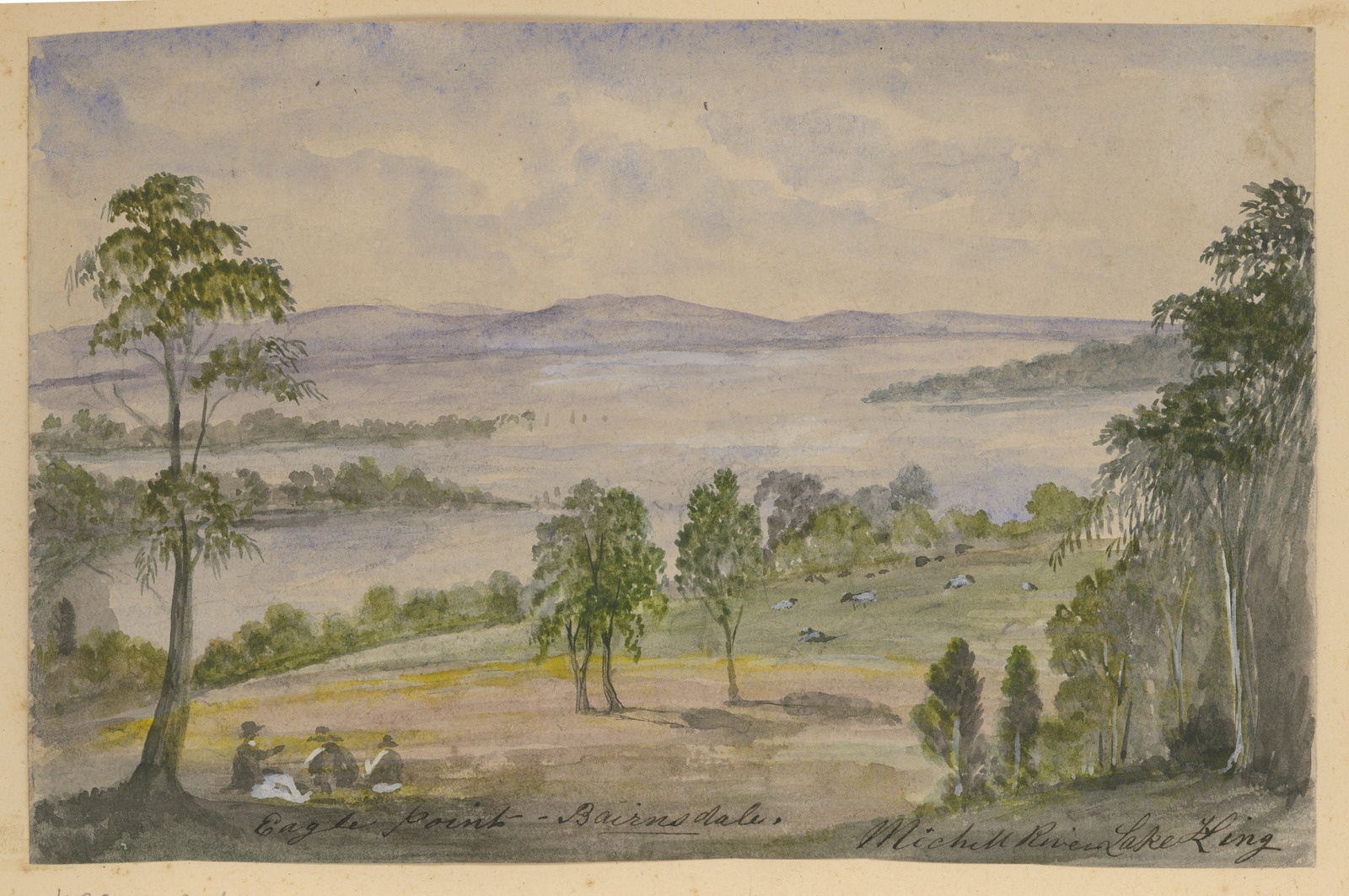
Eagle Point, Bairnsdale (Mitchell River and Lake King), Daniel Long, between 1856 and 1883 [State Library Victoria]

Eagle Point is served by a primary school, Eagle Point Primary School, founded in 1894. It is situated on School Road and Eagle Point Rd. In 2010, it completed a redevelopment project which included two new buildings.

== Tourism ==
Eagle Point is known for its tourism. It has two caravan parks: Eagle Point Caravan Park and the Lake King Caravan Park. Eagle Point's main attraction is the reserve. Kangaroos can regularly be seen on silt jetties. The other attraction is Lake King or The Mitchell River; Lake King is sometimes closed off to the public due to algal blooms. Bairnsdale Riviera Triathlon Club hosts an annual event in Eagle Point each summer.

== Arts & Culture ==
Although there are no art galleries in Eagle Point, the town has a small number of professional artists living and working in the area.
