= Western Tyers =

- Town
- Western Tyers State School in 1968

- Coordinates: 37°56′48″S 146°18′37″E
- Country: Australia
- State: Victoria
- LGA: Shire of Baw Baw
- Location: 180 km (110 mi) E of Melbourne; 20 km (12 mi) W of Erica

Western Tyers was a small town in the Gippsland region of eastern Victoria, Australia, founded as a timber community in the late 19th century and at its peak home to around 500 residents. It is located on the Western Tyers River, approximately 20 kilometres west of Erica, and about 180 kilometres east of Melbourne. The nearby mountains form part of the Baw Baw Ranges, themselves forming part of the much larger Great Dividing Range.

Whilst only one original house still stands, Western Tyers once possessed a school, post office and public hall. The Western Tyers State School opened in 1942 and closed on 29 March 1968. At the time of its closure, it only had pupils from two families and was described as "dilapidated" by The Age, which published an article titled: "Is Western Tyers the worst school in Victoria?".

Until 1969, it was a functioning community but with the closure of the timber mill all the remaining residents left. The town site was bought privately in 1970 as freehold.
