= Murrumbidgee District =

Murrumbidgee District New South Wales
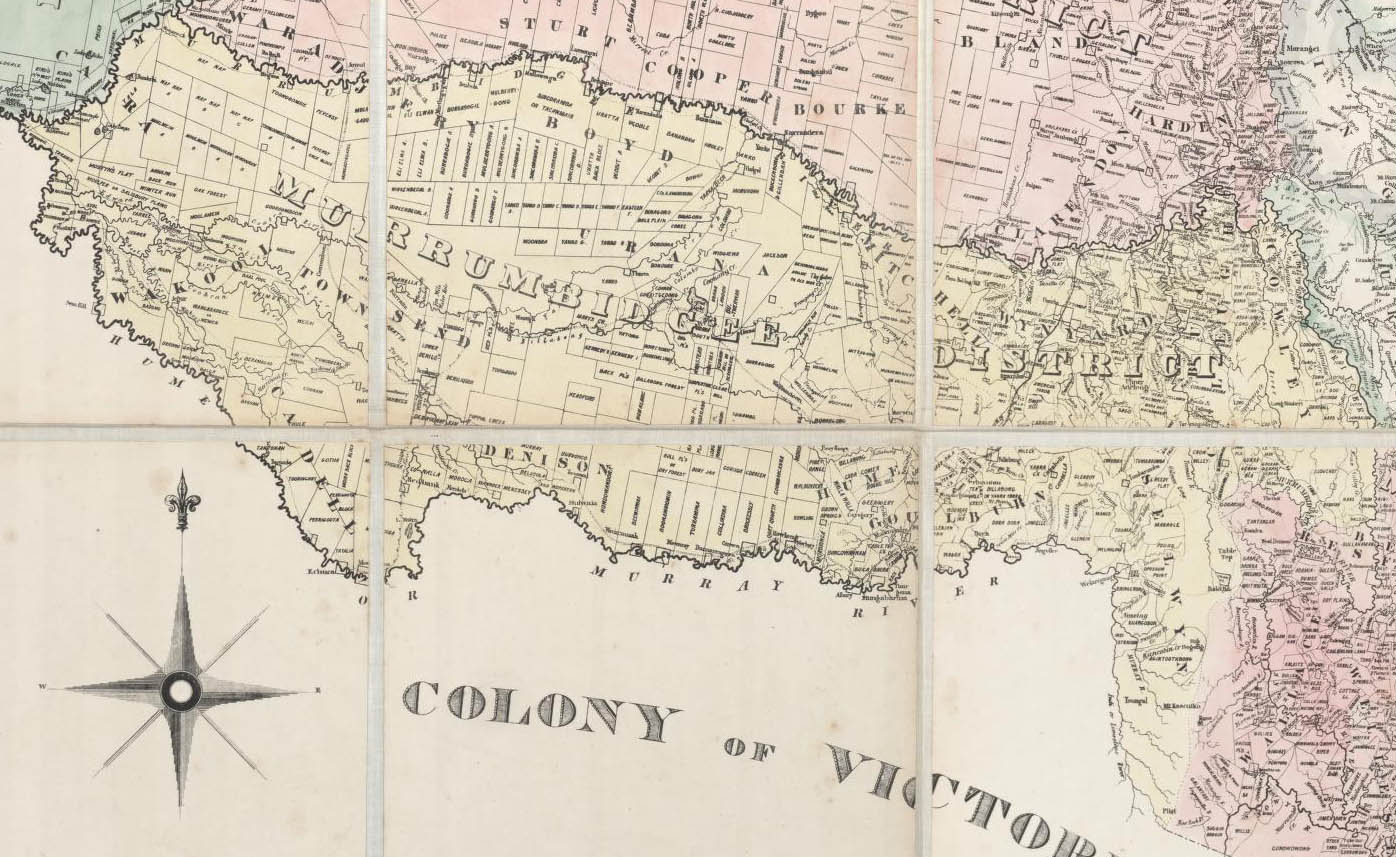
- Murrumbidgee District in the 1860s
- Area: 48,562 km^{2} (18,749.9 sq mi)
Lands administrative divisions around Murrumbidgee District:
Lachlan	Lachlan
Darling	Murrumbidgee District
Wimmera (Vic)	Loddon (Vic)	Maneroo

The Murrumbidgee District was a district (also called a squatting district, pastoral district or grazing district) used in New South Wales in the nineteenth century to refer to the land between the Murrumbidgee River and Murray River, that is now mostly known as the Riverina region. Some maps show the district included the parts of what is now the Australian Capital Territory that was to the west of the Murrumbidgee River. The district was originally one of the districts used to refer to the area outside the limits of location, but later continued to be used as the name after counties were proclaimed within this area. It went out of use after 1884, when new districts were proclaimed.

In 1841 it had a population of 1139, with 180,654 sheep and 62,848 cattle, 1517 horses, with 1,795 acres (7 km^{2}) in cultivation and 147 stations, according to an 1841 map.

In 1843 it had a population of 1463, with 226,682 sheep, 93,458 cattle, 2315 horses, 2,400 acres (10 km^{2}) in cultivation and 172 stations.

In 1852 the district included 12 million acres (49,000 km^{2}) total, with 400,000 sheep, 100,000 cattle and 3,000 horses

Early maps show the eastern boundary of the district being the Murrumbidgee River, while an 1871 map shows the eastern boundary being the Goodradigbee River, with the Monaro district in the area between the Goodradigbee and the Murrumbidgee.

It comprised the area of the counties of Wakool, Townsend, Cadell, Denison, Urana, Hume, Goulburn, Wynyard, Mitchell, Selwyn, Buccleuch and part of Caira and Waradgery.
