= New South Wales Mounted Police =

Mounted section of the New South Wales Police Force

New South Wales Mounted Police Unit
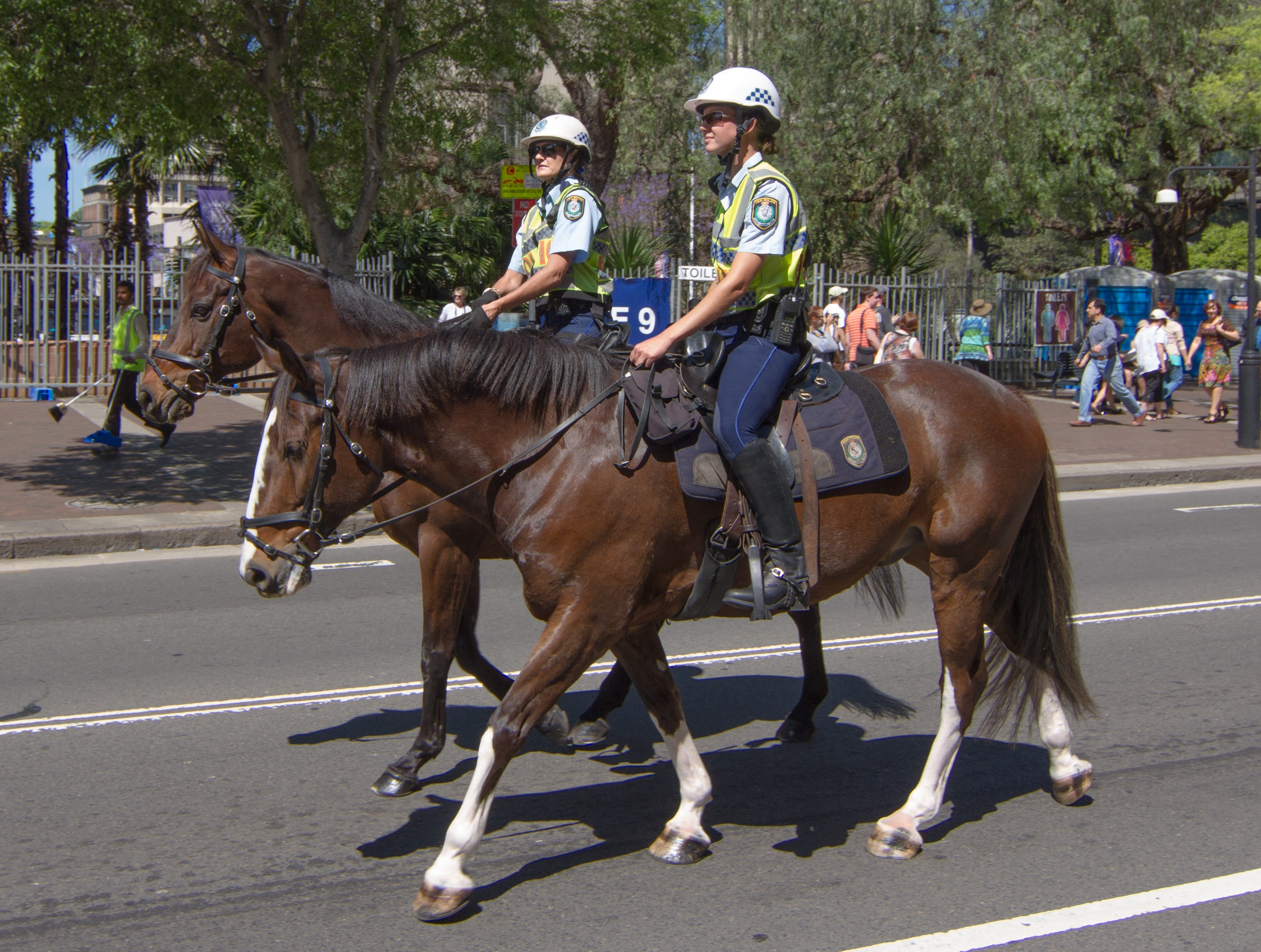
- Active: 7 September 1825 – present
- Country: Australia
- Agency: New South Wales Police Force
- Type: Mounted police
- Headquarters: Redfern

Structure
- Sworn Officers: 36
- Grooms: 9

Equipment
- Animals: 38 horses

The New South Wales Mounted Police Unit is a mounted section of the New South Wales Police Force.

Founded by Governor Sir Thomas Brisbane on 7 September 1825, the Mounted Police were recruited from the 3rd Regiment of Foot, stationed in New South Wales at the time, to protect travellers, recaptured escaped convicts and suppress Indigenous resistance to colonisation. The force remained the mounted division of the colonial military force in the colony of New South Wales until 1850, when it took on a more civilian role.

The New South Wales Mounted Police Unit is the oldest continuous mounted group in the world.

== History ==
After the Bathurst War between European colonists and the Wiradjuri concluded in 1824, it was deemed necessary that a mounted infantry division be formed in colony of New South Wales. In 1825, the Colonial Office approved the idea and agreed to finance the troopers for the mounted force who were to be recruited from the British Army in Australia. The colonial government of New South Wales provided funding for the cost of the horses and equipment. Colonel William Stewart of the 3rd Regiment of Foot organised the first detachment by selecting 28 soldiers from his force. This first detachment of mounted troopers, which was based at Bathurst, became active on 4 November 1825. The second detachment was formed in February 1826 and was based at Wallis Plains which is now called Maitland.

While the Bathurst division were quickly utilised to capture escaped convicts, the Wallis Plains unit were deployed in the suppression of Aboriginal resistance along the newly colonised areas of the Hunter Valley. Lieutenant Nathaniel Lowe, who volunteered for the Mounted Police from the 40th Regiment of Foot, ordered multiple executions of Aboriginal prisoners as part of the campaign. Reinforcements of mounted infantry under Ensign Archibald Robertson from the 57th Regiment of Foot were required from Sydney and Newcastle throughout the latter half of 1826 in campaigns by the Mounted Police against the local Wonnarua people. With the aid of armed settlers such as Robert Scott of Glendon, the Mounted Police conducted raids of local Aboriginal camps and by early 1827, resistance in the area ended. Lieutenant Lowe was brought before a court to face charges of extrajudicial murder, but was acquitted and reinstated to his position.

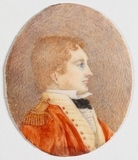
Lieutenant Lachlan Macalister

By 1829, the force was commanded by Lieutenant Colonel Kenneth Snodgrass. There were four areas of operation, the main detachment of the unit, incorporating the Governor's guard, was stationed in Sydney at the Belmore Barracks (located on the present site of the Central railway station). There were three country divisions based at Bathurst, Goulburn and Maitland. Lieutenant Lachlan Macalister, who was also a prominent pastoral capitalist in the colony, was placed in charge of the Argyle Division and later commanded the Bathurst Division. Capturing outlaw gangs of escaped convicts, commonly referred to as bushrangers, was the main employment of the Mounted Police at this time. The Bushranging Act of 1830 which enabled the arrest without warrant of anyone suspected of being a criminal aided the force in their duties.

The Mounted Police absorbed the Mounted Orderlies (established as a replacement for the Governor's Body Guard of Light Horse) in 1836. This unit existed as a separate component of the mounted police until at least 1860.

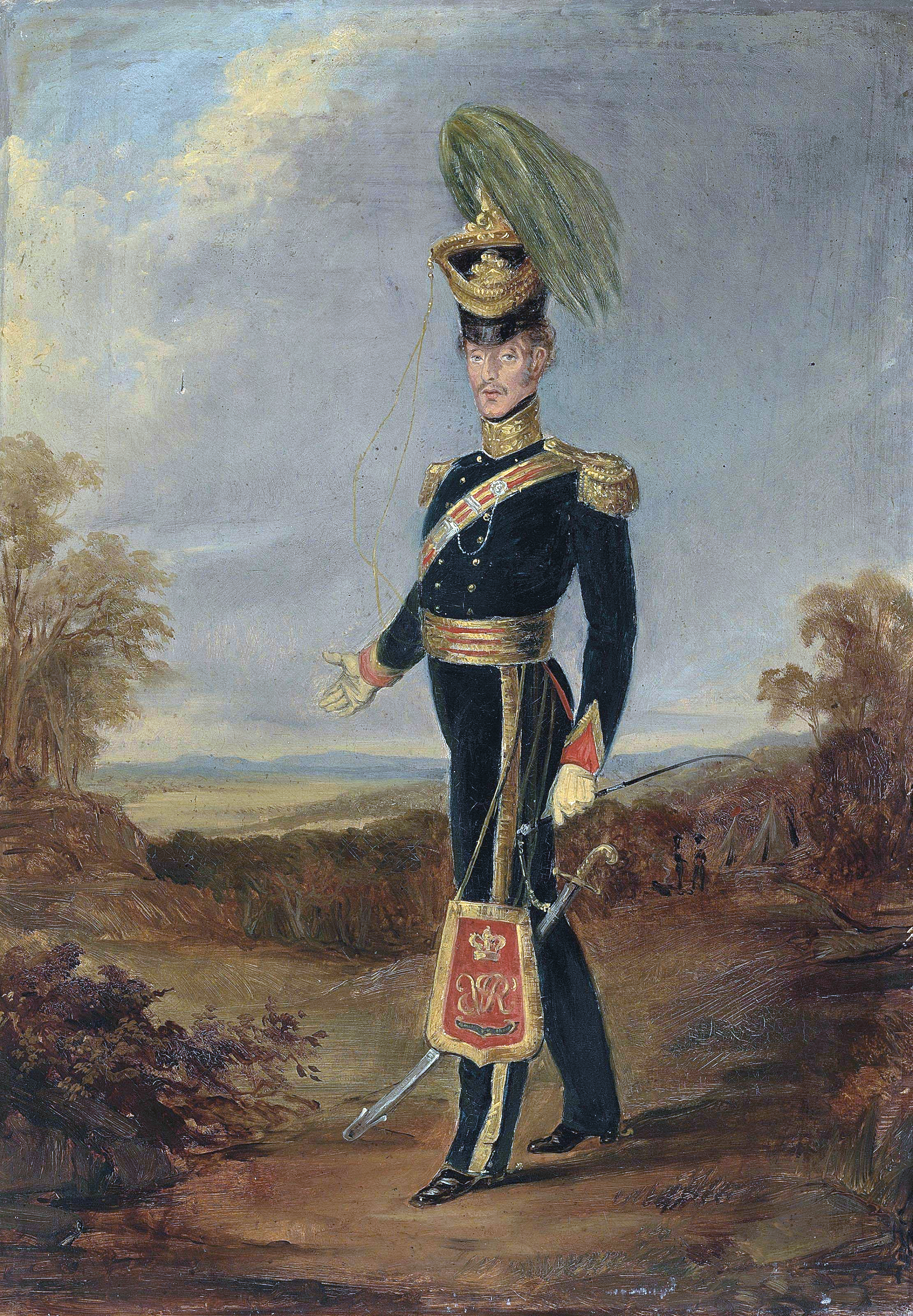
Major James Winniett Nunn, 80th Regiment, Commandant of the New South Wales Police

In 1837, Major James Winniett Nunn of the 80th Regiment became Commandant of the Mounted Police. Settlers from New South Wales at this time was spreading into regions that are now known as Port Phillip and the Liverpool Plains. Resistance by the Gamilaraay people to colonisation in the Liverpool Plains area prompted the colonial government of New South Wales to send a large force led by Nunn to suppress this opposition. In early 1838, Nunn conducted a two-month sweeping operation along the Gwydir and Namoi Rivers that culminated in the Waterloo Creek massacre, where his mounted troopers shot dead at least 50 Gamilaraay people. This operation coincided with numerous other massacres of Aboriginals in the area perpetrated by groups of European colonists, of which the Myall Creek massacre is the best known. An inquiry into Nunn's campaign exonerated him of any wrongdoing and he continued to command the Mounted Police as they expanded their operations in the south of the colony.

By the mid-1840s, the Mounted Police consisted of around 150 troopers in five divisions distributed among 35 stations ranging from Muswellbrook in the north, Portland Bay in the south and Wellington in the west. The much cheaper Border Police had by this time usurped most of the functions of the Mounted Police and the cost of maintaining the force was deemed too expensive for the colonial government to run. In 1850 its paramilitary function was ceased and the force took on the more civilian role that it has in the present day. The frontier duties of repressing Aboriginal resistance was largely taken on by the Native Police.

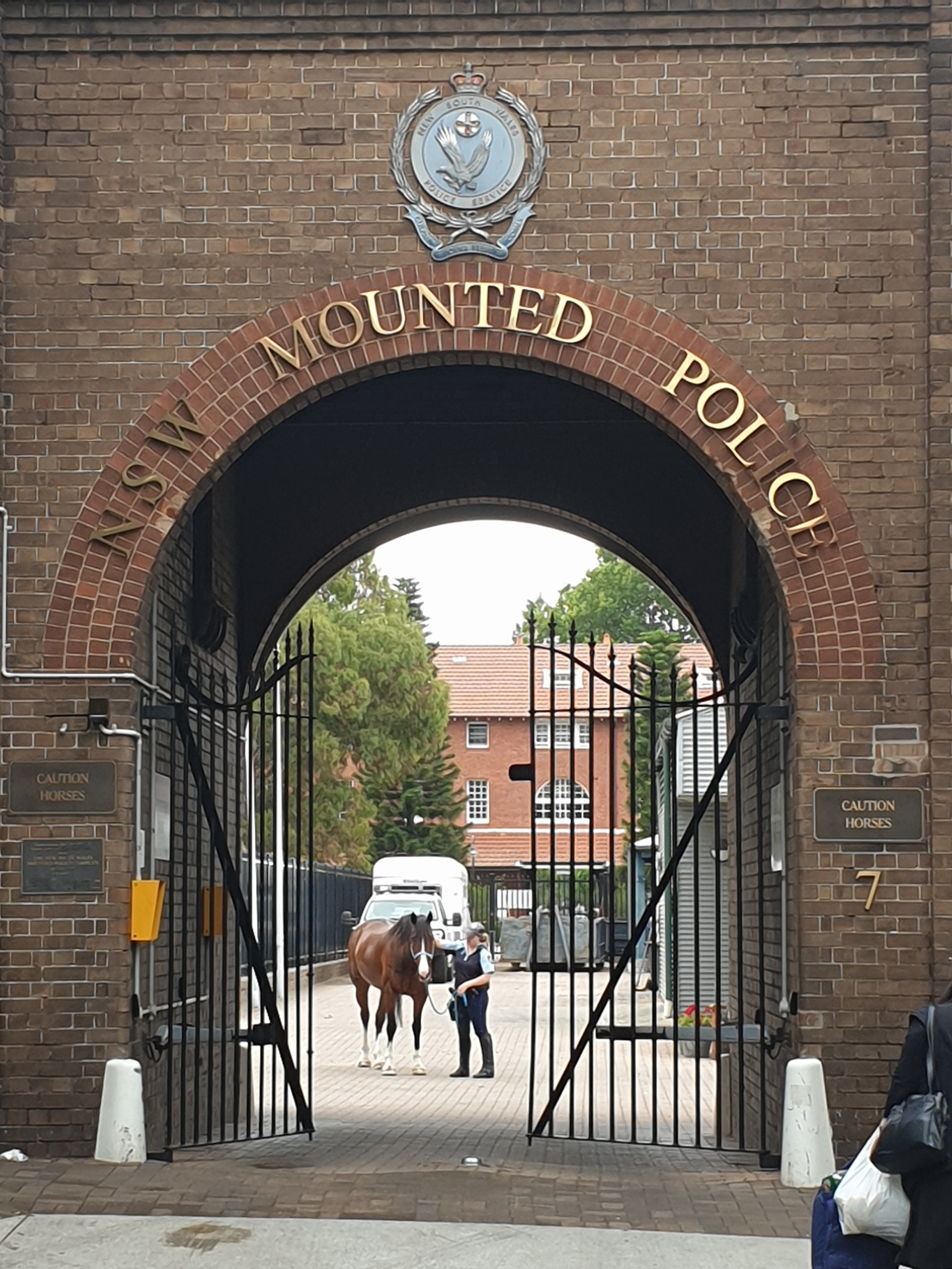
New South Wales Mounted Police headquarters, Redfern

For over a century the New South Wales Mounted Police were a key part of policing, as horses were the main form of transport. The unit was formed three years before the London Mounted Police and 38 years prior to the 1873 formation of the Royal Canadian Mounted Police. By the 1900s the Mounted Police had grown to a strength of over 800 personnel and more than 900 horses. Most stations throughout the state had mounted units attached to them. It was around this time that they unit was moved from Belmore Barracks, to allow for the construction of the present Central railway station, to a temporary base at Moore Park, and then on to the Bourke Street Police complex at Redfern in 1907.

== Horses ==
Horses used by the mounted Police generally include a variety of breeds, including heavier horses such as warm bloods, draft horses and Clydesdale crosses. Historically horses were donated to the section, and ex race horses have been included in the donations. It can take up to two years to train a mount.

== Modern-day duties ==
Duties include traffic and crowd management, riot control, patrols, and ceremonial protocol duties (including taking part in the Queen's Jubiliee celebrations in London). Currently the New South Wales Mounted Police has a strength of 36 officers and around 38 mounts. Nine full-time grooms are employed to assist with the care of the horses and running and maintenance of the stable complex. The Mounted Police have recently been trialling iPads to give them access to the same information the non-mounted police have.
