= John Dobie =

Naval surgeon and politician

John Dobie (1794 – 17 July 1866) was an English-Australian politician.

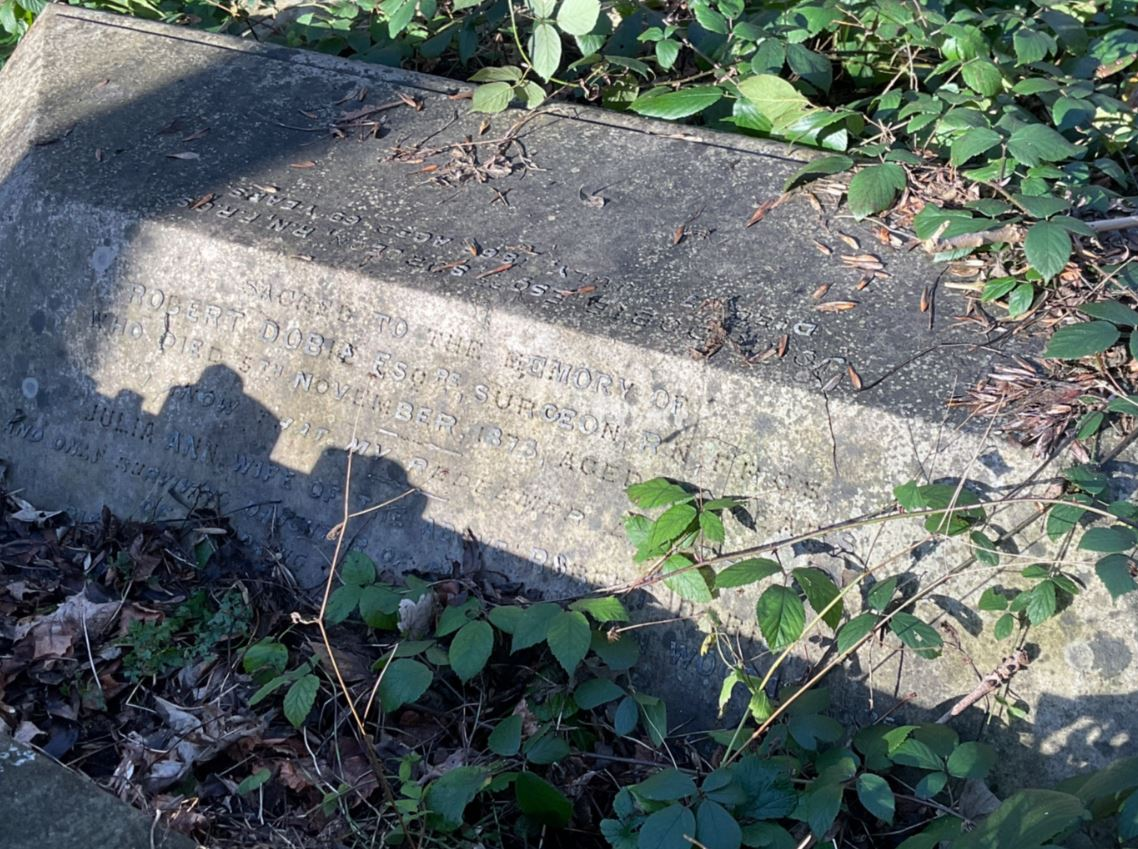
Grave of John Dobie in Highgate Cemetery

He was a naval officer and surgeon and travelled widely, in 1824 settling in Hobart in Tasmania. In 1838 he was brought to Sydney as first health officer, and granted land in Cassilis. He led an expedition to the Clarence River Valley and played a key role in developing the district. From 1844 to 1864 he was a member of the Australian Medical Board. He was also an appointed member of the New South Wales Legislative Council from 1851 to 1855. While in Sydney he built up a very large property at Newington in the city's inner west. He donated a large stained glass window with his coat of arms to the University of NSW. In later life he sold his properties and returned to England, where he died in 1866. He is buried on the west side of Highgate Cemetery.
