= Commissioner of Crown Lands (Australia) =

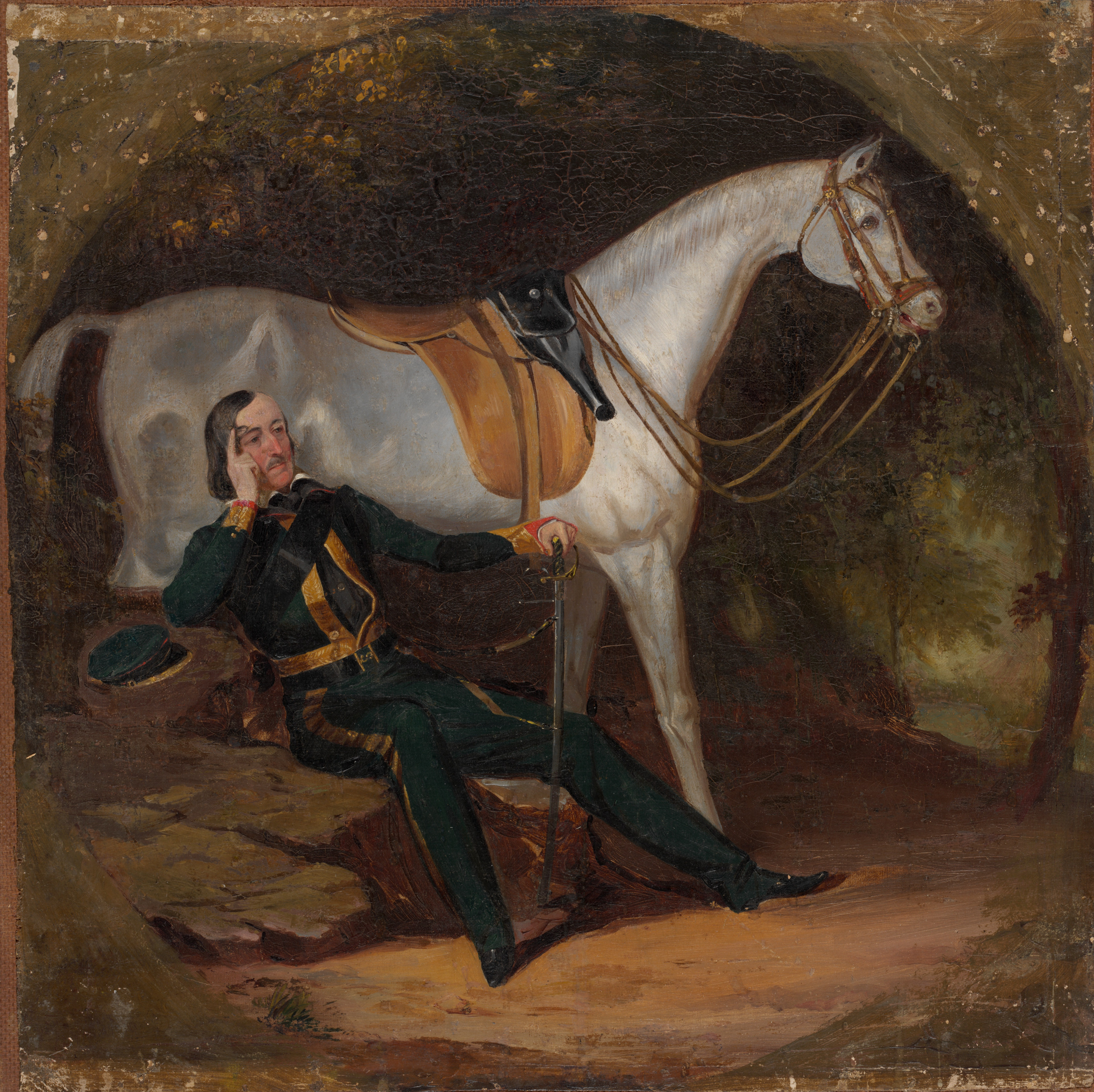
Commissioner Henry Bingham c1840

The Commissioner of Crown Lands was a government official who was appointed to administer Crown (government) land in the various Australian colonies.

In New South Wales, from 1836, each land district had its own Commissioner of Crown Lands reporting to a Chief Commissioner of Crown Lands. From 1839, each commissioner had responsibilities in relation to the Border Police of New South Wales and, depending on the land district, was sometimes involved in frontier violence and suppression of local Aboriginal people. The position of Chief Commissioner lapsed in 1878 and the commissioners' positions were abolished around 1880.

In Western Australia at Federation the position became Minister for Lands in the state government.

== See also ==
- Charles Tyers
- Commissioners of Crown Lands (United Kingdom)
- Minister for Lands (Western Australia)
