= Maria Jane Scott =

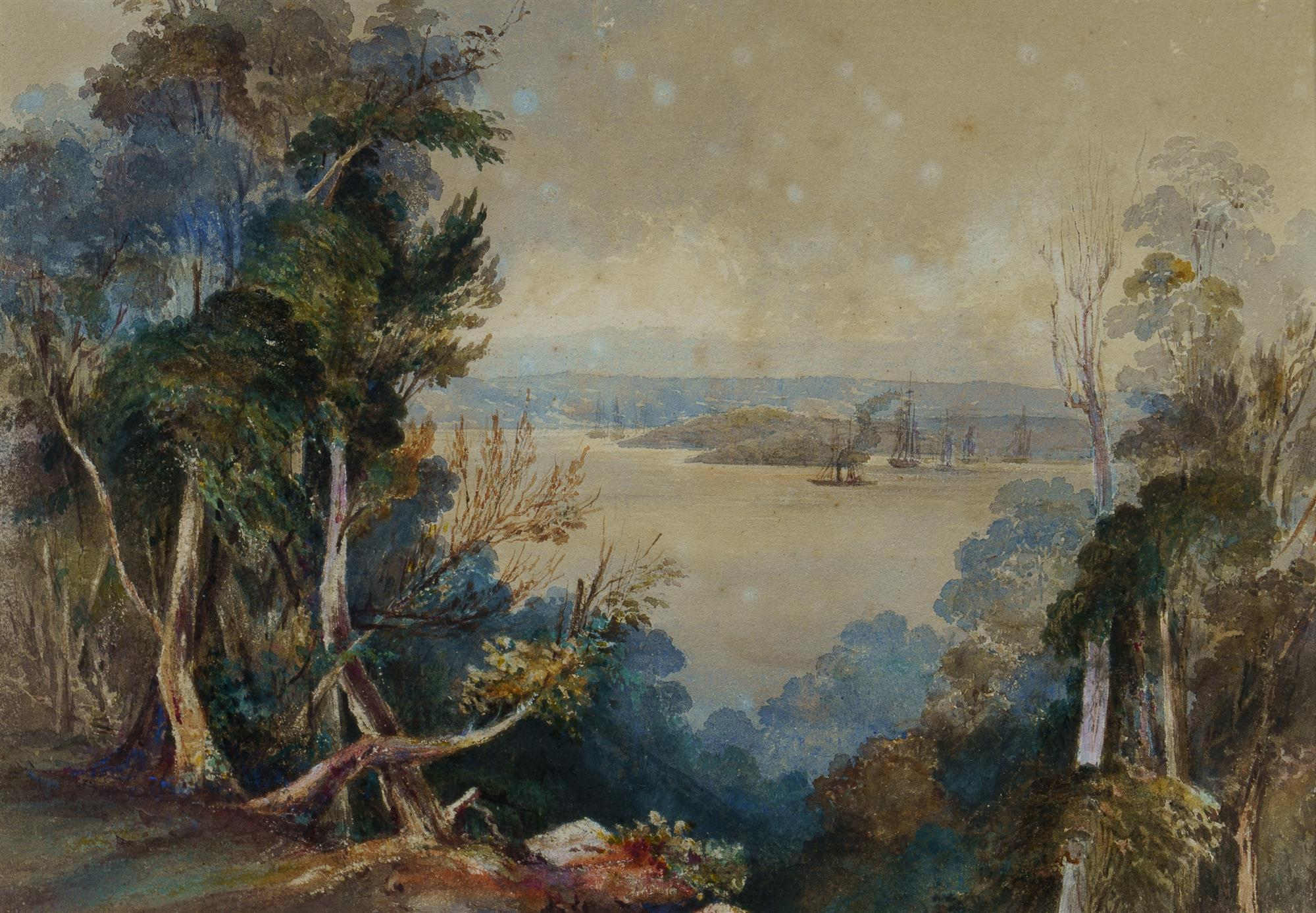
- Sydney from Lavender Bay by Maria Jane Scott
- Born: 1821; West Indies
- Died: April 30, 1899 (aged 77–78); Paddington
- Occupation: Novelist, lithographer, painter
- Spouse(s): David Charles Frederick Scott
- Parent(s): George Barney

Maria Jane Barney Scott (1821 – April 30, 1899) was an Australian painter, lithographer, and novelist who published her books under the pseudonyms M.I.S.T. and Spray.

The daughter of George Barney and Portia Henrietta Peale Barney, Maria Jane Barney was born in 1821 in the West Indies, where her father had served for two decades. He was a military engineer of the Corps of Royal Engineers and son of the painter Joseph Barney. The Barney family settled in Sydney, Australia in 1835 and George Barney would later become Surveyor General of New South Wales and Lieutenant Governor of the Colony of North Australia. Soon after their arrival, she took lessons from painter Conrad Martens. She accompanied her father to Van Diemen’s Land from 1836 to 1837, where she sketched locales including Launceston, George Town, and Hobart Town. In 1838, she married Scottish-born David Charles Frederick Scott, then a cavalry captain and painter and later a police magistrate in Sydney, who died in 1881. They would have two children, Edward Frederick (1840-71) and George Mitchell (1842-50).

She began exhibiting her work in 1854 at the Australian Museum Exhibition and was awarded a medal for works she sent to the 1862 London International Exhibition. Her landscapes were praised and bear the influence of Martens.

She began publishing books under the pseudonyms M.I.S.T. and Spray in 1871. Joan Kerr suggests her books were "probably written partly as an escape from the desolation she felt at the sudden death of her only surviving son, Edward." She published a series of works that have been described as "featuring orphans or stolen children, villainous adults defrauding them of their inheritance, and saintly young people dying."

Scott and her husband founded the Lisgar Training Home for Domestic Servants in 1870 in Ashfield, which moved next to their home in Paddington in 1875. Later known as the Protestant Female Training School for Domestic Servants, it continued to operate after her death.

== Bibliography ==
- Annine: A Novel. 1 vol. London: T. C. Newby, 1871
- A Brother or Lover? A Sister of Bride?: and, The Lights and Shadows of Hazelglen. 1 vol. London: T. C. Newby, 1872.
- Pearl and Willie : A Tale Sydney : John Woods & Co. Ltd , 1873 (as Spray)
- A Many Colored Bubble: A Tale. 1 vol. London: T. C. Newby, 1874.
- Not So Ugly: A Novel. 1 vol. London: Morgan and Hebron, 1874.
