= Piper (Indigenous Australian explorer) =

Wiradjuri explorer and guide (c.1810–?)

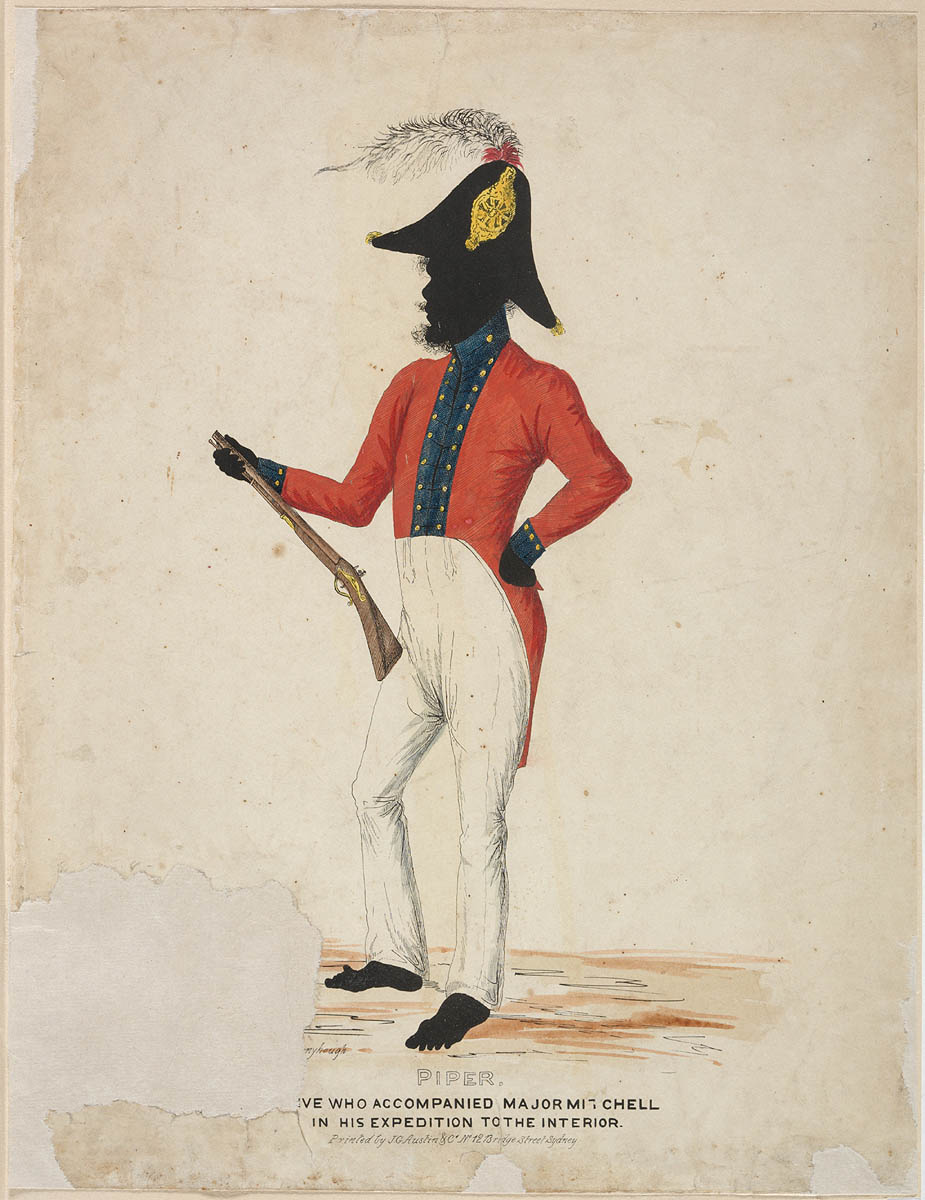
Portrait of Piper, c.1836

Piper (c. 1810 – ?), also known as John Piper and Jemmy Piper, was a Wiradjuri man from the Bathurst region of New South Wales who led Sir Thomas Mitchell's 1836 expedition along the Lachlan, Murrumbidgee and Murray Rivers and into what is now known as the State of Victoria.

== Early life ==
Details of Piper's early life are unclear, except that he was born c. 1810, to a Wiradjuri clan near the site which became the British military outpost of Bathurst. As a boy he survived the Bathurst War between the colonists and his people. It appears that he obtained the name of Piper during adolescence after becoming associated, probably as servant, with the military officer John Piper who was granted the estate of Alloway Bank near Bathurst in the mid-1820s.

== Mitchell's 1836 expedition ==
In 1836, the chief surveyor of the colony of New South Wales, Thomas Mitchell, was tasked with exploring the major rivers to the south-west of Sydney. He arrived in Bathurst in March of that year with his entourage of around 25 men, herds of livestock, and drays filled with supplies. At Bathurst, he entered into an agreement with Piper to act as a guide and envoy to assist the large group through the lands of the 'savage natives'. As part of the arrangement, Piper was given a horse, food, clothes and weapons, including a carbine and sword.

Piper led Mitchell's expedition down the Lachlan River, where he interacted with the local Wiradjuri clans, facilitating the travel through their countries. Piper initially maintained traditional culture such as refusing to emu meat, which was reserved for elders, and following prolonged introductory customs when meeting new tribesmen.

However, as the expedition proceeded, Piper soon realised as being part of an armed British group, he had a unique authority over other Aboriginal people. At Lake Cargelligo he was allowed to take a wife, subsequently named Kitty, from the Indigenous people who lived there. The expedition also took on other Wiradjuri guides along the Lachlan, such as Barney, Tommy-came-first, Tommy-came-last and the female widow Turandurey, who acted as deputies to Piper.

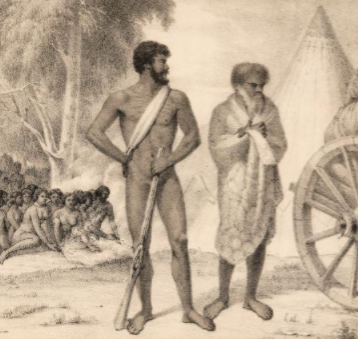
1838 engraving of Piper (left)

On arriving at the Murrumbidgee River, Piper was no longer able to understand the language of the local people saying they spoke "Irish". However, there was a Wiradjuri man living there who was able to assist in translation. As the group travelled west along the Murray River they encountered a group of Barkandji people from the Darling River at Lake Benanee. They had heard of Mitchell's expedition and had journeyed from the Darling to confront Mitchell for killing several of their kinspeople on that river a year beforehand. Piper attempted negotiations but Mitchell became deeply suspicious of their actions, and on 27 May 1836, his men opened fire on a large group in what is now known as the Mount Dispersion massacre. Piper seems to have participated in the shooting and was afterwards informed that seven Barkandji were killed, although this is probably an underestimate.

In a similar situation at Lake Boga, Piper was confronted by a group of 12 local Indigenous men who were angry at Piper for bringing white people to their country and threw spears at him. Piper subsequently shot one of them dead.

As Mitchell's group entered what is now Victoria, Piper became homesick for Bathurst, but Mitchell was very supportive for Piper to remain. Mitchell regarded Piper as the most accomplished member of his group, being the tallest, bravest, best hunter, swimmer and diver, and was now able to speak multiple Indigenous languages. Piper was still able to communicate with the local people in what was a very foreign land and obtained the name of the Wimmera River from local people.

On the return journey to Sydney, Piper continued to assist Mitchell's group, including informing them how to make a sweet drink from steeping ironbark blossoms in water. When an expedition member named Taylor disappeared while crossing the Broken River, Piper was foremost in diving into the river to locate him. Piper brought the unconscious man to the surface but Taylor was not able to be resuscitated.

== Life in Sydney and Bathurst ==
When the expedition arrived back in Sydney, Piper was regarded as a minor celebrity. He was given a coat, and a hat that once belonged to Governor Ralph Darling. He took another wife and was given money by members of the public. He was also given firearms and a brass plate engraved with his name and the title of "Conqueror of the Interior". Piper later returned to his homeland of Bathurst accompanied by Mitchell's other Wiradjuri guides Tommy-came-first and Tommy-came-last. Bureemal, the convicted killer of the botanist Richard Cunningham, was also placed under Piper's authority to be returned to Wiradjuri country.

According to Mitchell, Piper journeyed extensively in the years after the 1836 expedition, travelling to Adelaide, Moreton Bay and the Hunter Region.

== Mitchell's 1846/47 expedition ==
In December 1846, Mitchell started on another expedition, this time into the uncolonised northern parts of the New South Wales. He again set out from the Bathurst region and again took on Piper as his main Indigenous guide. Piper was given a horse, clothing, rations and a double-barrelled shotgun. However, Piper soon became disillusioned with the expedition and it was revealed to Mitchell that he was going to abandon the group, taking with him Mitchell's other Aboriginal guide, Yuranigh. Despite Piper's clear importance to Mitchell in the previous expedition, Mitchell now viewed Piper as unforgivably disloyal, referring to him as a 'true savage'. Before Piper could enact his plan, Mitchell had him arrested and placed in chains. Piper was sent back to Bathurst under police escort. Nothing further is known of Piper.

== Legacy ==
Piper is remembered by having a street named after him in the town of Balranald, and Pipers Creek near Kyneton was also named in his honour.

== See also ==
- List of Indigenous Australian historical figures
