= Robertson Land Acts =

The Crown Lands Acts 1861 (NSW) (or Robertson Land Acts) were introduced by the New South Wales Premier, John Robertson, in 1861 to reform land holdings in New South Wales and in particular to break the squattocracy's domination of land tenure. The acts allowed free selection of Crown land and made redundant the limits of location, which limited sale of land to the Nineteen Counties which had applied since 1826.

== The acts ==
Under the reforms unsurveyed land in an area which had been declared an agricultural reserve in designated unsettled areas could be selected and bought freehold in 40-to-320-acre (16–129 ha) lots of Crown land, wherever situated at £1 per acre (£2 9s 5d/ha), on a deposit of five shillings per acre (12s 4d/ha), the balance to be paid within three years, an interest-free loan of three-quarters of the price. Alternatively at the end of the three years, the balance could be treated as an indefinite loan, as long as 5% interest was paid each year.

The Crown Lands Acts consisted of two separate acts: the Crown Lands Alienation Act 1861 (No 26a) and the Crown Lands Occupation Act 1861 (No 27a) These acts were amended in 1875 and 1880. The Robertson acts were replaced completely by new legislation with effect from the beginning of 1885.

Selectors were required to live on their land for three years and to make improvements worth £1 per acre. Speculation was to be prevented by requiring actual residence on the land. In return pastoralists were protected by granting them, at the conclusion of their present leases, annual leases in the settled districts and five yearly leases elsewhere, with a maximum area or carrying capacity, and an increase in rent by appraisement of the runs. The pastoralist retained the pre-emptive right to buy one twenty-fifth of his lease in addition to improved areas, and also possessed the pre-lease to three times the area of the freehold. In addition they were to continue to possess the right to request the survey and auctioning of large parcels of their lease. This meant that they could bid at short notice for such land while other potential bidders were unaware that the land was on the market. The work of Alexander Grant McLean, Surveyor General of New South Wales facilitated the introduction of these Land Acts.

== Consequences ==
Subsequently, there were struggles between squatters and selectors, and the laws were circumvented by corruption and the acquisition of land by various schemes, such as the commissioning of selections to be passed eventually to squatters and the selection of key land such as land with access to water by squatters to maintain the viability of their pastoral leases. The Land Acts accelerated the alienation of Crown land that had been acquired under the principle of terra nullius, and hence accelerated the dispossession of Indigenous Australians.

The Land Acts paralleled the demands for similar legislation amending the United States Preemption Act of 1841, culminating in the Homestead Act of 1862, and was succeeded by similar legislation in other Australian colonies in the 1860s and Canada's Dominion Lands Act of 1872.

== See also ==
- Nineteen Counties
