= Alexander Grant McLean =

Alexander Grant McLean (1824 – 28 September 1862) was a Surveyor General of New South Wales, (then a colony, now a state of Australia).

== Early life ==
McLean was born in Scotland, the second son of Captain John Leyburn Maclean, principal superintendent of convicts (1837–55), and his wife Jane Eliza, née Grant. He and arrived in Sydney, Australia with his family in the Earl Durham on 31 August 1837.

== Career in Australia ==
On 11 May 1842, McLean was appointed to a position on the department of the Surveyor General of New South Wales, Thomas Mitchell. McLean was appointed chief draftsman in 1856. On 12 August 1859 McLean was made acting Surveyor General by the then minister for lands, John Robertson (later Premier of New South Wales). McLean authorised the compilation of a map of New South Wales (published 1861); his work facilitated the introduction of the Robertson Land Acts. McLean was appointed Surveyor General on 1 November 1861.

McLean was a captain in the Sydney Battalion of Volunteer Rifles.

== Later life ==
McLean suffered from Bright's disease, taking medical leave in August 1862. However, his condition worsened and he died on 28 September 1862 in Mulgoa, New South Wales, Australia. He was buried in the Mulgoa cemetery with Anglican church rites on 30 September 1862. About 70 to 80 members of the Sydney Battalion of Volunteer Rifles marched in procession at his funeral.

== Legacy ==
There is a plaque commemorating him his role in the Sydney Battalion Volunteer Rifles at St James Anglican Church in Sydney.

The district of Maclean in Queensland was named after him; today this is two localities, North Maclean and South Maclean.

Preceded by George Barney	Surveyor General of New South Wales; 1861–1862	Succeeded by Walker Rannie Davidson
