= Philip Francis Adams =

Australian politician

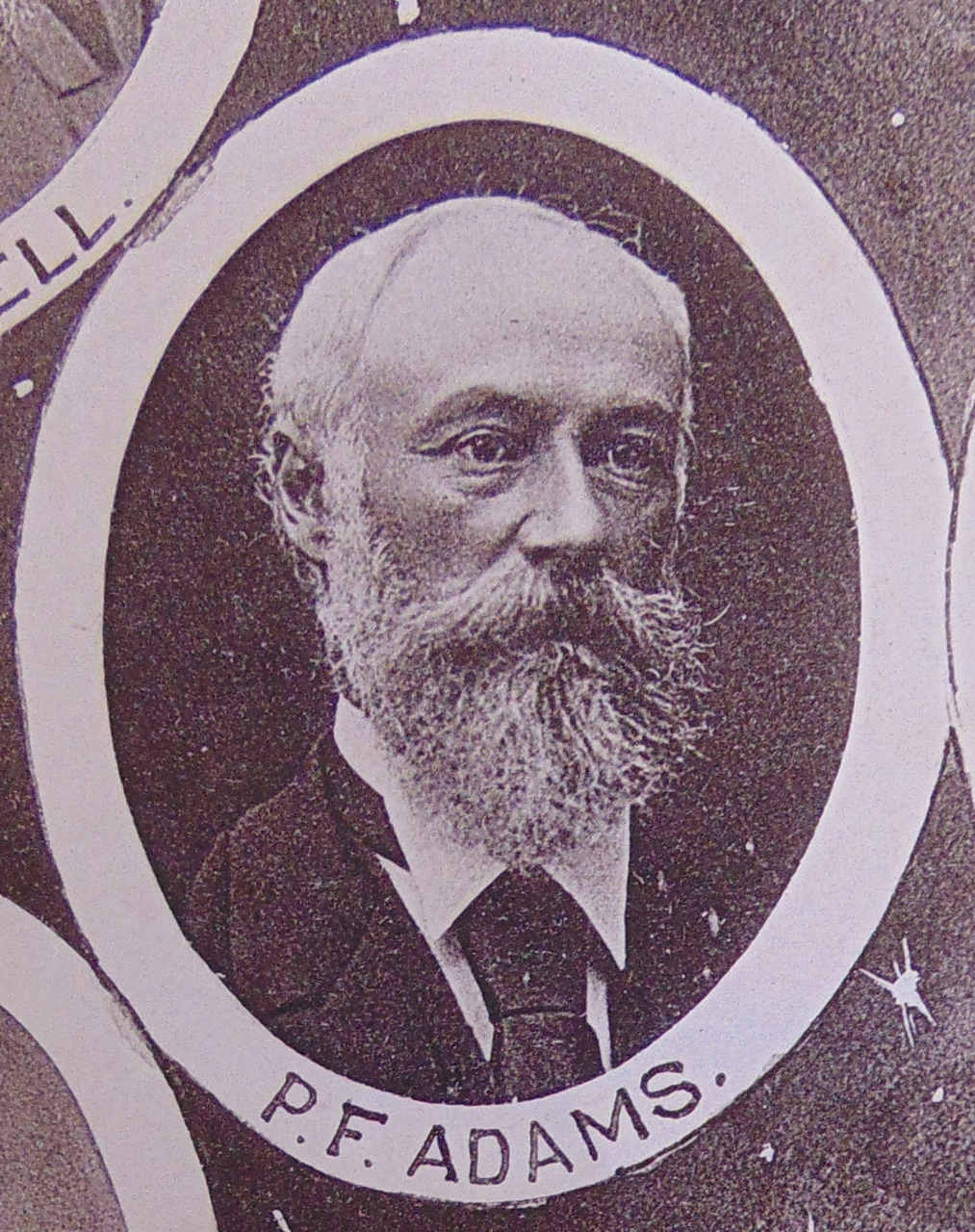

Philip Francis Adams (1828 – 22 June 1901) was a Surveyor General of New South Wales, Australia.

Adams was born in Suffolk, England in 1828. Ten years later, his family removed to the north of Ireland, and he was educated at the Belfast Institution. In 1851, he emigrated to British North America, and subsequently had an unlucky experience at the Californian diggings. He came to Sydney, Australia in 1854, and was Government Land Surveyor for the Maitland district till 1857. He was afterwards connected with the Trigonometrical Survey of New South Wales. In 1864, he was appointed Deputy Surveyor General, and Surveyor General on 17 March 1868, succeeding Walker Rannie Davidson.

Adams retired on a pension on 31 December 1887, and was a member of the New South Wales Commission in Sydney for the Colonial and Indian Exhibition of 1886.

== Notes ==
Preceded by Walker Rannie Davidson	Surveyor General of New South Wales; 1868–1887	Succeeded by Edward Twynam
