= Donald Grant (surveyor) =

Donald Morrison Grant AO RFD is a professional surveyor and the former Surveyor-General of New South Wales.

== Early life ==
Grant was born in Bairnsdale, Victoria in 1934. He attended St Patrick's College, Ballarat, Victoria.

== Public Service Career ==
Grant was appointed Chief Surveyor, Adelaide City Council in 1965. In 1980, he was appointed Assistant Surveyor-General in the South Australian Lands Department and was later promoted to Deputy Surveyor-General. In 1986, he was appointed Surveyor-General of New South Wales and remained in that position until he retired in 2000.

== Military service ==
Grant is a graduate of the Officer Cadet School, Portsea, class June 1954. He was commissioned into the Royal Australian Engineers and served for eight years in the Regular Army. After leaving the Regular Army he continued service in the Army Reserve attaining the rank of Lieutenant Colonel. His military service included overseas deployment to Papua New Guinea, Japan and South Vietnam. He was awarded the Reserve Force Decoration in 1982. He was previously awarded the National Medal in 1977 and a clasp to the medal in 1979.

== Public Sector Mapping Agencies ==
Grant conceived and led the establishment of the Public Sector Mapping Agencies (PSMA) and was the founder and inaugural chair. His leadership brought together of the mapping agencies of the Commonwealth Government and each of the States and Territories to produce the fundamental digital spatial mapping to support the official five yearly Australian censuses and to ensure Australia had quality-assured, reliable, seamless mapping and spatial data to support the needs of government, scientific monitoring and development of a national spatial information services industry. The impact on the way the government and private sectors, and the wider community operate, cannot be overestimated – from the use of national address files to bringing land parcel boundaries and land ownership to the person in the street, to assisting in real estate management to planning systems, to the way society uses the Internet to purchase goods on line through auto recognition of street addresses. Grant's leadership was at a time of tension between the Commonwealth and State/territory mapping agencies and followed a well-publicized period of tension within the Commonwealth between the former Australian Survey Office (ASO), Division of National Mapping (Natmap) and the Royal Australian Survey Corps (RASvy) during 1986–88. Even after the creation of the then Australian Surveying and Land Information Group (AUSLIG) by amalgamating ASO and Natmap, the tension continued such that the Australian Bureau of Statistics (ABS), dissatisfied with the technical inertia of Natmap and the difficulties in adopting modern spatial data approaches and design at a Federal level, opted away from Natmap for the 1991 Census, to pursue a private sector mapping provider – Peripheral Systems. Unfortunately, ABS's engagement of Peripheral Systems was largely sub-optimal for the Census. Grant saw this as an opportunity for the nation to forge a partnership between all government mapping agencies to produce a seamless, authoritative mapping base for the census and also to ensure all States and territories were able to complete and upgrade all existing state/territory cadastres (land parcel mapping for support of land registration and land management).

== Honours and awards ==
Grant was appointed an Officer of the Order of Australia in January 2020 for "distinguished service to surveying, particularly through the establishment of a combined public sector mapping agency" He was previously appointed a Member of the Order of Australia in June 1994 in recognition of service to surveying. Grant has also been awarded three honorary doctorate degrees from Australian universities. In 1997, Charles Sturt University conferred on Grant the degree of Doctor of Applied Science (honoris causa) for his contribution to Australian and international surveying, mapping and spatial information. Also in 1997, the University of New South Wales awarded Grant the degree of Doctor of Science (honoris causa). In 2004, the University of Melbourne awarded Grant the degree of Doctor of Surveying (honoris causa) for his contributions to surveying.
