= Thomas Mitchell (explorer) =

Scottish surveyor and explorer in Australia (1792–1855)

Sir Thomas Mitchell
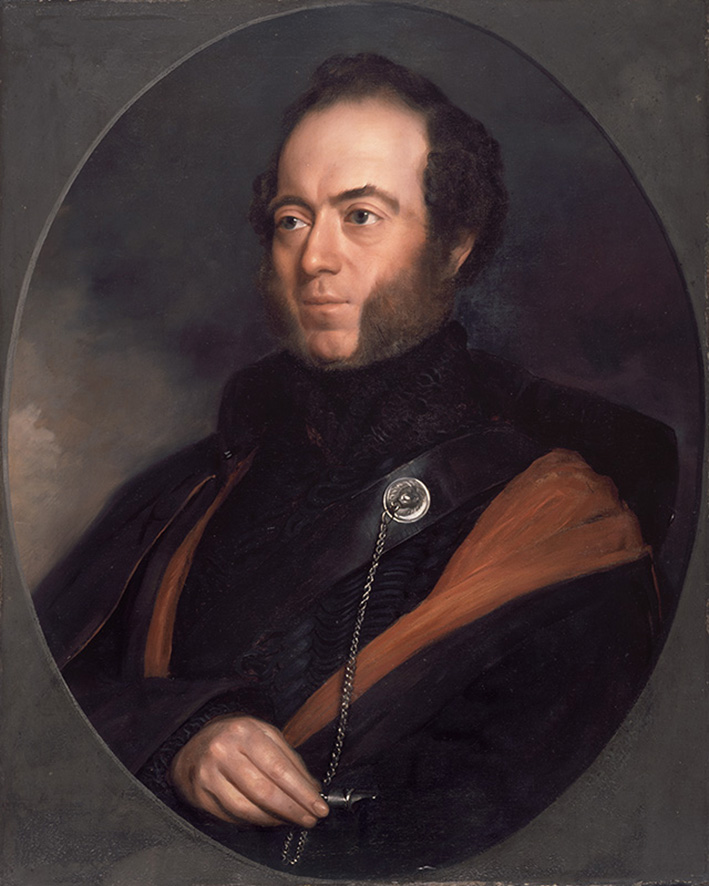
- Portrait of Major Sir Thomas Mitchell (c. 1830s)
- Born: Thomas Livingstone Mitchell; 15 June 1792; Grangemouth, Scotland
- Died: 5 October 1855 (aged 63); Sydney, New South Wales
- Resting place: Camperdown Cemetery, Newtown, New South Wales, Australia
- Education: Doctor of Civil Law
- Alma mater: University of Edinburgh
- Occupations: Surveyor, explorer
- Known for: Explorations of south-eastern Australia, Wyld's Atlas
- Title: Lieutenant colonel Sir
- Spouse: Mary Blunt
- Children: 12
- Relatives: John Mitchell Mitchell (brother)
- Awards: Knighthood

Sir Thomas Livingstone Mitchell (15 June 1792 – 5 October 1855), often called Major Mitchell, was a Scottish surveyor and explorer of Southeastern Australia. He was born in Scotland and served in the British Army during the Peninsular War. In 1827 he took up an appointment as Assistant Surveyor General of New South Wales. The following year he became Surveyor General and remained in this position until his death. Mitchell was knighted in 1839 for his contribution to the surveying of Australia.

== Early life ==
Thomas Livingstone Mitchell was born at Grangemouth in Stirlingshire, Scotland, on 15 June 1792. He was son of John Mitchell of Carron Works and was brought up from childhood by his uncle, Thomas Livingstone of Parkhall, Stirlingshire. The antiquarian John Mitchell Mitchell was his brother.

== Peninsular War ==
On the death of his uncle, he joined the British army in Portugal as a volunteer in the Peninsular War, at the age of sixteen. On 24 June 1811, at the age of nineteen, he received his first commission as 2nd Lieutenant in the 1st Battalion 95th Rifles (later the Rifle Brigade / Royal Green Jackets).

Utilising his skills as a draughtsman of outstanding ability, he was occasionally employed in the Quartermaster-General's department under Sir George Murray. He was present at the storming of the fortresses of Ciudad Rodrigo, Badajos and San Sebastian as well as the battles of Salamanca and the Pyrenees. Subsequently, he would receive the Military General Service Medal with bars for each of these engagements.

When the war was over, Mitchell was selected to reside in Spain and Portugal for four years to complete sketches of the battlefields for the Military Depot. His duties also included conducting several other important surveys which had been impossible to finish whilst operations were in progress in the field. On 10 June 1818, during this posting, Mitchell married Mary Blunt (daughter of General Richard Blunt (d. 25 December 1859) in Lisbon and gained promotion to a company in the 54th Regiment.

In the summer of 1819, he returned to Britain where he devoted himself to finishing the drawings, but with the cessation of the government allowances he had to stop this work. The reductions in the military establishment which followed the withdrawing of the Army of Occupation from France forced Mitchell on to half-pay. It was not until much later, while Mitchell was in London between 1838 and 1840, that the work was completed. The finished drawings were published by the London geographer James Wyld in 1841 under the title Atlas containing the principle battles, sieges and affairs of the Peninsular War. Of high quality, the drawings are the prime source for the topography of the war.

== New South Wales ==
In 1827, with the support of Sir George Murray, Mitchell became Assistant Surveyor General of New South Wales with the right to succeed John Oxley. Oxley died the following year, and on 27 May 1828, Mitchell became Surveyor General. In this post he did much to improve the quality and accuracy of surveying – a vital task in a colony where huge tracts of land were being opened up and sold to new settlers. One of the first roads surveyed under his leadership was the Great North Road, built by convict labour between 1826 and 1836 linking Sydney to the Hunter Valley. The Great South Road (now replaced by the Hume Highway), also convict-built, linked Sydney and Goulburn. He kept a record of his 'Progress in roads and Public Works in New South Wales to 1855', including sketches and plans of Sydney, Emu Plains, the Blue Mountains, Victoria Pass, roads to Bathurst, Wisemans Ferry, and indigenous Australians.

As Surveyor General, Mitchell also completed maps and plans of Sydney, including Darling Point, Point Piper, the city, and Port Jackson. In 1834 he was commissioned to survey a map of the Nineteen Counties. The map he produced was done with such skill and accuracy that he was awarded a knighthood. Around this time, a portrait of Mitchell was painted showing him in the uniform of Major of the 1st Rifle Brigade of the 95th Regiment, complete with whistle used to direct the movement of troops.

During his tenure in New South Wales, Mitchell led four extensive and historically significant surveying expeditions into the interior of eastern Australia.

=== First expedition ===
In 1831, a runaway convict named George "The Barber" Clarke (a monument to whom exists at Barber's Lagoon near Boggabri and who had lived with the Kamilaroi people in the area for several years) claimed that a large river called Kindur flowed north-west from the Liverpool Ranges in New South Wales to the sea. Charles Sturt believed that the Murray-Darling system formed the main river system of New South Wales and Mitchell wanted to prove Sturt wrong. Mitchell formed an expedition consisting of himself, assistant surveyor George Boyle White and 15 convicts who were promised remission for good conduct. Mitchell took 20 bullocks, three heavy drays, three light carts and nine horses to carry supplies, and set out on 24 November 1831 to investigate the claim. On reaching Wollombi in the Hunter Valley, the local assistant surveyor, Heneage Finch, expressed a desire to join the expedition which Mitchell approved, provided he first obtain extra provisions and rendezvous later.

The expedition continued northward, and having climbed the Liverpool Range on 5 December, they found an Aboriginal tribe who had fled from their home in the Hunter Valley and were suffering from what appeared to be smallpox. On 8 December they arrived at Quirindi and by 11 December the expedition had reached Wallamoul Station near Tamworth, the northern extent of white settlement at the time.

Mitchell continued his northward push into uncolonised territory, guided by a local Gamilaraay man named "Mr. Brown". In mid-December, near to where Boggabri now stands, they located the remains of a stockyard and huts built by George Clarke and his Aboriginal colleagues. By early January 1832 Mitchell's group was travelling along the Namoi River, by which stage Mr Brown had left them. Mitchell's party then headed north unguided but managed to reach the Gwydir River in mid-January where they found a small Aboriginal village of conical-roofed huts. They followed the Gwydir west and made it to the Barwon River by the end of the month. Mitchell came to the correct conclusion that the Barwon flowed into the Darling River and decided not to proceed any further.

At this stage, Finch had finally caught up with the main group. Finch conveyed the news that the provisions he had obtained had been ransacked by Aboriginal people at Gurley. Two men he had left to guard the supplies had also been killed. The immediate effect was that Mitchell decided to abandon the expedition and return south. The party retraced their path having tense but peaceful interactions with large groups of Gamilaraay people along the way. They reached Gorolei on 18 February where Mitchell buried the bodies of the two killed men and salvaged some equipment. Aboriginal people approached the group laying down their spears and offering females to Mitchell's men in an apparent attempt at appeasement for the killings. Mitchell refused the offer but accepted their guidance on an easy way back to the Namoi River. Once back at Wallamoul, Mitchell placed White in charge of the main party, while he returned hastily to Sydney. He was satisfied that there was no truth about the river Kindur claimed by Clarke. Fourteen years later, Mitchell revealed that the convicts had indulged in sexual relations with Aboriginal women.

=== Second expedition ===
Mitchell's next expedition was in 1835. The purpose was to explore the course of the Darling River from where Sturt had turned back in 1829, to where it joined the Murray River. There were 24 men in the party including Mitchell, James Larmer (assistant surveyor) as second in command, Richard Cunningham (colonial botanist) and 21 other men. The main party under Larmer left Parramatta on 9 March and rendezvoused with Mitchell at Boree near the township of Orange. From there, the expedition was guided through the Goobang Ranges by local Wiradjuri people toward the Bogan River. On 17 April 1835, Richard Cunningham wandered away from the party while looking for botanical specimens and went missing. The party, with the assistance of various local Aboriginal people, searched for him until 5 May, following Cunningham's tracks around the headwaters of the Bogan until they disappeared. Cunningham's dead horse, saddle, glove and fragments of his coat and map were all they found. Months later, a search party of military mounted police commanded by Lieutenant Henry Zouch of the first division, discovered that Cunningham had been killed by four Wiradjuri men and his bones were found and buried at Currindine.

After the fruitless search for Cunningham, Mitchell decided to continue the expedition. He was assisted by a local unnamed elder who provided a guide called Tackijally. This man led Mitchell downstream along the waterholes adjacent to the Bogan River as far as Nyngan. Tackijally left them at this point and the group was soon involved in a brief confrontation after they startled an Aboriginal man at a waterhole. The man, who was shot in the hand, had his wounds dressed by the group and later departed. They proceeded down the Bogan, encountering several gatherings of people to which Mitchell gave tomahawks and pieces of an old sword. On 25 May the junction with the Darling River was reached. Here, on a high point of land which bore many Aboriginal grave sites, Mitchell decided to build a fort as he realised that they "had not asked permission to come there" and he needed a stockade for "stout resistance against any number of natives". He named it Fort Bourke in honour of the Governor, Richard Bourke.

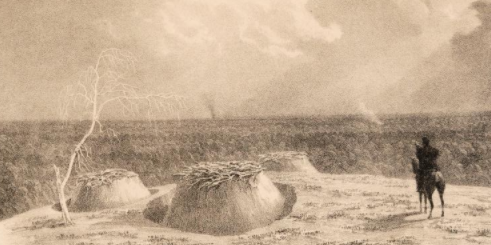
Aboriginal tomb site near Menindee Lakes

Two whale boats had been transported the whole distance on bullock drays and on 1 June Mitchell launched the boats on the Darling to transport the party downriver. However, the Darling became shallower and unnavigable resulting in the expedition resorting once again to overland progress. They encountered many tribes as they headed south, with Mitchell documenting the agricultural practices of some, such as the harvesting of Panicum decompositum, and the large permanent dwellings of others. One clan appeared more hostile than others, kicking up dust and spitting at party members. Mitchell acknowledged that his group were "rather unceremonious invaders of their country" but inflamed tensions by firing a pistol at a tree. Mitchell wrote that "the more they saw of our superior weapons...the more they shewed their hatred and tokens of defiance." The party continued downriver, meeting with friendlier locals, passing through villages and noting the construction of their tomb-sites.

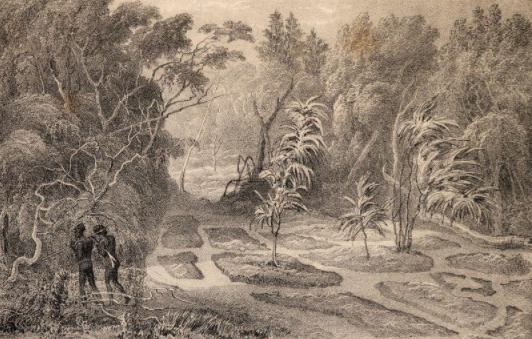
Indigenous burial ground at Milmeridien near Nyngan

Just north of the Menindee Lakes, the expedition came across a large congregation of several tribes and Mitchell decided that continuing the exploration would be too dangerous. On 11 July, just as Mitchell had resolved to return to Sydney, shots were heard from a forage party up the river. Mitchell sent a further three armed men to the scene of the shooting and the firing continued. After more than an hour, some members of the group returned reporting that a skirmish had occurred over the possession of a kettle and at least three Aboriginal people had been shot dead, including a woman and her child. One of Mitchell's men had been knocked unconscious. The party then commenced their return via the outbound route with Mitchell deciding to avoid contact with the various tribes as much as possible. The "spitting tribe" attempted to burn down their camp on this return journey which resulted in Mitchell ordering shots to be fired over their heads. They arrived at Fort Bourke on 10 August and continued back along the Bogan River. Near Nyngan they met again with members of Tackijally's tribe who allowed Mitchell to walk through their cemetery at Milmeridien. Mitchell soon tired of the clan asking for food and ordered some of his men to march at them with bayonets. On 9 September they came to the upper reaches of the Bogan where they found a cattle-station had already been formed along their route by William Lee. The expedition arrived back at their starting point of Boree on 14 September.

While Mitchell did not trace the Darling River to its junction with the Murray River, the course and terrain of the Bogan River and much of the Darling River had been charted. The places where this and other Mitchell expeditions were most assailed by Aboriginal Australians, including the location of Cunningham's killing, are marked on an 1836 map produced by Mitchell.

=== Third expedition ===
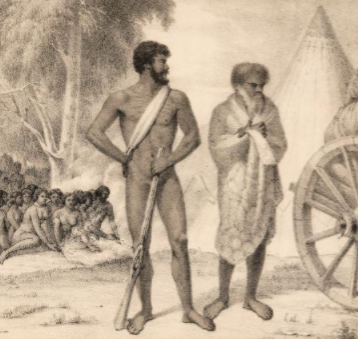
Piper with people from Lake Benanee

The goal of Mitchell's third expedition was to explore and survey the lower part of the Darling River, with instructions to head up the Murray River and then return to the settled areas around Yass. Second in command was assistant surveyor Granville Stapylton. A Wiradjuri man named John Piper was also recruited and 23 convicts and ticket of leave men made up the rest of the party. The group set out from a valley near Mount Canobolas on 17 March 1836, and made their way to Boree and the Bogan River as on previous journeys, then veered south to the Kalare or Lachlan River to approach the Darling from its southern end where it joined the Murray.

The party was guided by various Aboriginal people such as "Barney" along the Lachlan, passing Lake Cargelligo, as John Oxley did in 1817. At this place they met with a large clan from which a number of people joined the expedition and gave vital information about waterholes, as the Lachlan was drying out. Piper also obtained a "good, strong woman" from this tribe. On 2 May they arrived at Combedyega where an Aboriginal widow named Turandurey with her four-year-old daughter Ballandella also joined the expedition as a guide. She remembered Oxley from nineteen years earlier and Sturt as well, and knew the lower Lachlan. The Murrumbidgee River was reached on 12 May, but at a point downstream from the junction with the Lachlan.

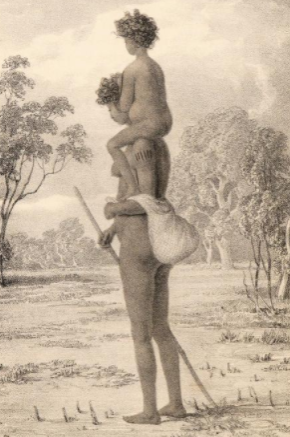
Turandurey and Ballandella

==== Mount Dispersion massacre ====
They continued down the Murrumbidgee until 21 May when they were close to the junction with the Murray River. A depot was established at this point, and Mitchell left Staplyton with eight men to guard the stock, while he ventured downstream with the rest of the group. According to the account given to a later enquiry by William Muirhead (bullock-driver and sergeant), Alexander Burnett (overseer) and Jemmy Piper (Aboriginal man accompanying the party): on 24 May Mitchell noticed that Barkindji tribesmen from the Darling River were gathering in large numbers, and by 27 May the hostile intentions of these men became known, when local Murray River people told Piper that the Barkindji were planning to kill Mitchell and his men. Mitchell had to decide whether to wait for an attack, or plan a pre-emptive manoeuvre. His numbers were reduced, as Staplyton and eight men were still at the depot. He split his party again, leaving half the men to hide in the scrub in ambush, while he continued ahead with the carts. When the armed Barkindji warriors approached, the convict Charles King, who was involved in the earlier killings, fired first without waiting for orders. The tribesmen fled into the river and Mitchell's two groups reunited on the shore and continued to shoot at the people for up to 15 minutes. Around 75 shots were fired with Piper later being told that seven Barkindji were killed and four wounded.

Mitchell wrote about the loss of life in his journal, describing the Barkindji as "treacherous savages", and detailing how his men had chased them away, "pursuing and shooting as many as they could". This section was withheld from Mitchell's report when it was released to the public in Sydney. Mitchell named the hill near to where the mass-shooting occurred Mount Dispersion and in May 2020 it was heritage-listed as the Mount Dispersion Massacre Site Aboriginal Place.

==== Onwards ====
The expedition continued down the Murray River, encountering a major Aboriginal grave-site at Red Cliffs. On 31 May they arrived close to the junction of the Murray with a "green and stagnant" waterway. Local people advised Piper that this was the Darling River. Mitchell did not believe it, and only when he travelled upstream for some distance, coming across the same type of burial mounds that he had seen in 1835, did he acknowledge that "this hopeless river" was the Darling. He turned back and headed upstream on the Murray to rejoin Stapylton at the depot. The reunited expedition now travelled south-east following the Murray. They passed Swan Hill on 21 June and encountered a group of native inhabitants at Lake Boga. These people were angry at Piper for "bringing whitefellows" to their country and threw spears at him. Piper shot one of them dead. Mitchell noted the local people's practice of making large nets that spanned above the river to catch waterfowl and also came across unusual animals such as the now extinct Southern pig-footed bandicoot.

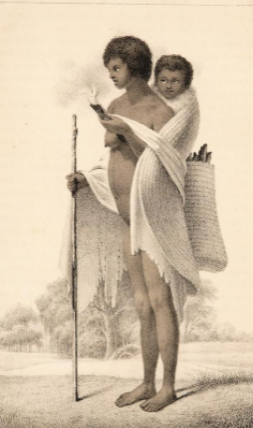
Maggie of the Wando with her child at Nangeela

At the end of June, Mitchell chose to leave the Murray to investigate better looking lands to the south-west. In early July the party crossed the Loddon River, and made their way in a south-westerly direction which brought them to the Grampians and the Wimmera River. Confrontation with people in this region resulted in an Indigenous man being shot in the arm. They were guided by a Jardwadjali woman, known later as Maggie of the Wando, along part of the Nangeela (Glenelg River) which was surrounded by opulent meadows of murnong daisy yams, cultivated by the local Aboriginal people. Mitchell was so impressed with the country he saw, he called it Australia Felix. He later constructed a fortified base on the river banks which he named Fort O'Hare. From here Mitchell led part of the group in boats down the Glenelg to where it discharged into the ocean at a bay which Mitchell named Discovery Bay. Mitchell then returned to Fort O'Hare and altered direction towards Portland Bay to the east. When this was reached on 29 August, Mitchell was surprised to find an established farm and whaling station operated by the Henty brothers.

The expedition continued north-east with Mitchell spending a night in a "snug old hut of the natives" at Narrawong. On 17 September, in order to speed his return, Mitchell split the party in two, taking 14 men with him and leaving the remainder with Stapylton to follow with the bullocks and drays. The young girl Ballandella went with Mitchell, while her mother Turandurey remained behind. On the plains around the Hopkins River, Mitchell came across a community of Aboriginal people who cultivated and harvested murnong tubers with specialised tools. Mitchell was wary and when forty of them approached his camp, he ordered his men to charge at them. On 30 September, Mitchell climbed and named Mount Macedon, from the summit of which he had a view of Port Phillip. Progress was slowed due a member of the group, James "Tally-ho" Taylor, drowning while crossing the Broken River. Their return to the frontier of British colonisation on the Murrumbidgee was not completed until 24 October.

==== Enquiry ====
When Mitchell arrived in Sydney in early November he was received with great joy. However, when the remainder of his party arrived two weeks later, rumours circulated about the mass killing on the Murray. He subsequently faced a Legislative Council Inquiry in December 1836, receiving an official rebuke. Ballandella joined Mitchell's family of eight other children and learnt to read and write, but was left by Mitchell when he returned to England. Ballandella later married and raised a family at Sackville where she died around the age of thirty.

=== Fourth expedition ===
Mitchell's fourth expedition was into northern interior of the colony (a region now part of Queensland) in 1845–46. He was convinced that a significant river must flow north-west into the Gulf of Carpentaria, and finding this river was the main focus of the endeavour.

On 15 December 1845 Mitchell started from Boree near Orange with a large party of 32 people including Edmund Kennedy as second in command (later speared to death at Escape River near Cape York). The Wiradjuri man named Piper from his previous expedition was also a member. Yuranigh (also Wiradjuri) and a ten year old boy from the lower Bogan River named "Dicky" were also assigned as guides. The party travelled north along the Bogan where a war between the British and the Indigenous inhabitants was at that time occurring. Mitchell noted areas where the British had been pushed back, abandoning their farmhouses which were subsequently burnt down by the local people. Mitchell stated "All I could learn about the rest of the tribe was, that the men were almost all dead, and that their wives were chiefly servants at stock stations along the Macquarie."

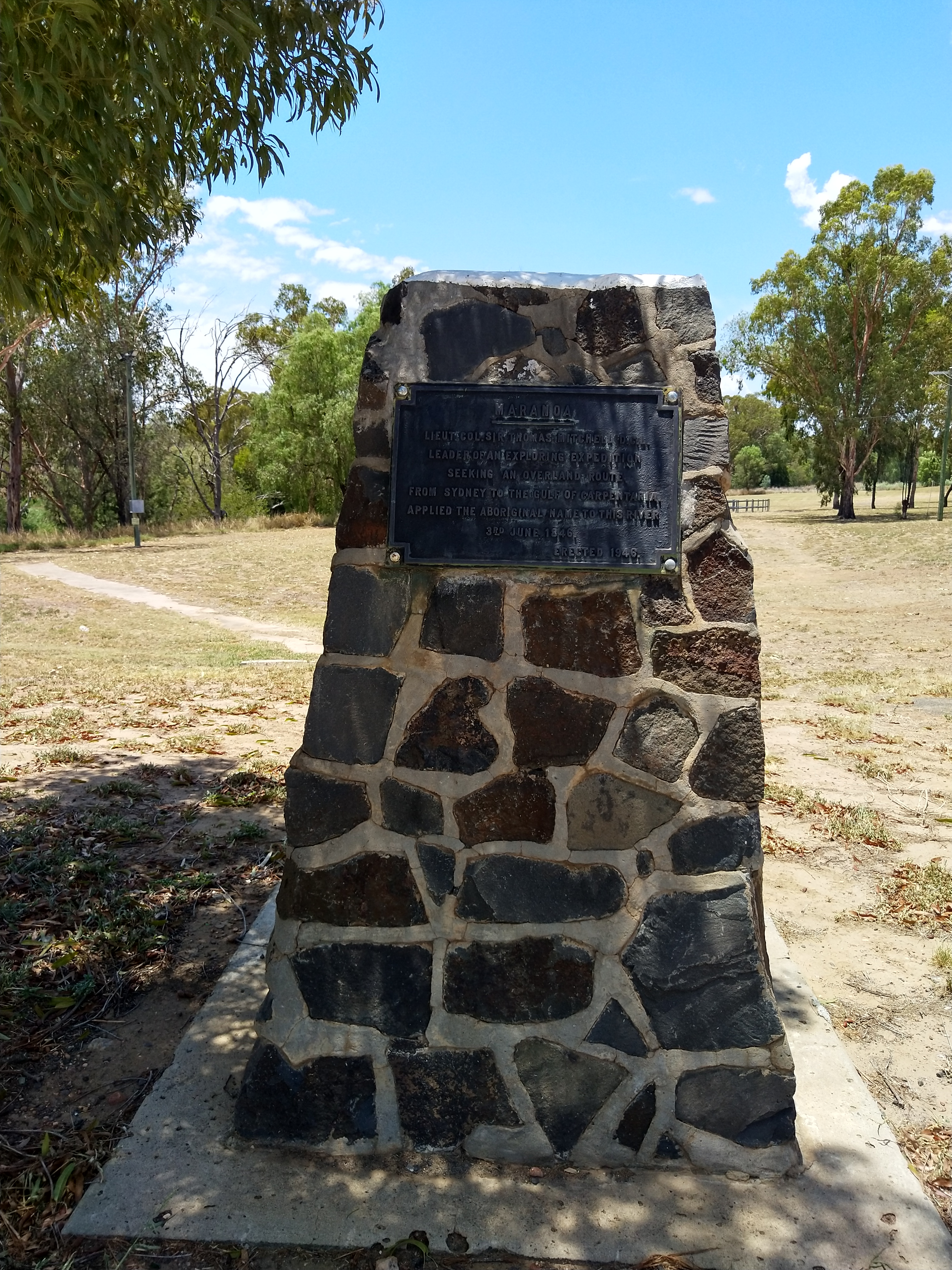
Centenary memorial erected in 1946 at Mitchell, Queensland, to commemorate explorer Thomas Mitchell's naming of the nearby Maranoa River

In January 1846, they left the Bogan and started following the Macquarie River where Mitchell was informed of Pipers' intention to leave the expedition. Mitchell ordered him back to Bathurst, accompanied by Corporal Graham. Near the Macquarie Marshes the harvesting of native millet by Aboriginal people to make bread was recorded and a local man named Yulliyally guided the group to the Barwon River. From here two brothers from a nearby clan led Mitchell to vital waterholes near the Narran River. Mitchell "blushed inwardly for our pallid race" knowing that "white man's cattle would soon trample these holes into a quagmire of mud." More bundles of harvested millet lay for miles along their journey up the Narran. Mitchell then received a message from his son, Roderick Mitchell, a Crown Lands Commissioner who had previously been to the area, which recommended following the Balonne and the Culgoa rivers north. They encountered many Indigenous people who guided the group along the way. On 12 April 1846 Mitchell came to a natural bridge of rocks on the main branch of the Balonne which he called St. George Bridge, now the site of the town of St George. Kennedy was left in charge of the main body here, and was instructed to follow on slowly while Mitchell pushed ahead with a few men. Mitchell followed the Balonne to the Maranoa, and the Cogoon (now called Muckadilla Creek, near Roma). This rivulet led him to an area with an "abundance of good pasturage" in which stood a solitary double topped hill that he named Mount Abundance, on which grew a species of bottle tree. He then crossed to the Maranoa and awaited Kennedy's arrival. Kennedy, who had trouble with local inhabitants trying to burn down his camp, rejoined Mitchell on 1 June 1846.

Leaving Kennedy for a second time, he set out on an extensive excursion of more than four months. Mitchell traversed the country at the head of the Maranoa, on one occasion discharging his rifle over the heads of the Indigenous people to gain "peaceful occupation of the ground". He sighted the headwaters of the Warrego and Nogoa Rivers, then came across the upper reaches of the Belyando River which they followed for a considerable distance. This river's name was given to Mitchell by Indigenous residents before the expedition's dogs chased them away, biting at their legs. Being a tributary of the Burdekin River, a waterway already visited by Ludwig Leichhardt on his expedition to Port Essington in 1845, Mitchell was dismayed to find that he was approaching ground already explored by Europeans. He returned to the head of the Nogoa and struck west, meeting with a tribe who caught emus with nets. He encountered a river which he was certain was the fabled waterway that would flow north-west to the Gulf of Carpentaria. He followed it until he came across a large clan of Aboriginal people living in permanent huts on the banks of a lagoon. He called this place Yuranigh Pond after his Wiradjuri guide and decided to return home. In honour of the British sovereign of the time, he named the waterway, Victoria River. On the homeward journey Mitchell noticed the well known grass that bears his name. They trekked back along the Maranoa River to St.George Bridge, arriving in Sydney 20 January 1847.

Later in 1847, Kennedy proved beyond doubt that the Victoria in fact did not continue north-west, but turned south-west and joined Cooper Creek. He renamed the watercourse the Barcoo River from a name mentioned by local Aboriginal people.

== Later career ==
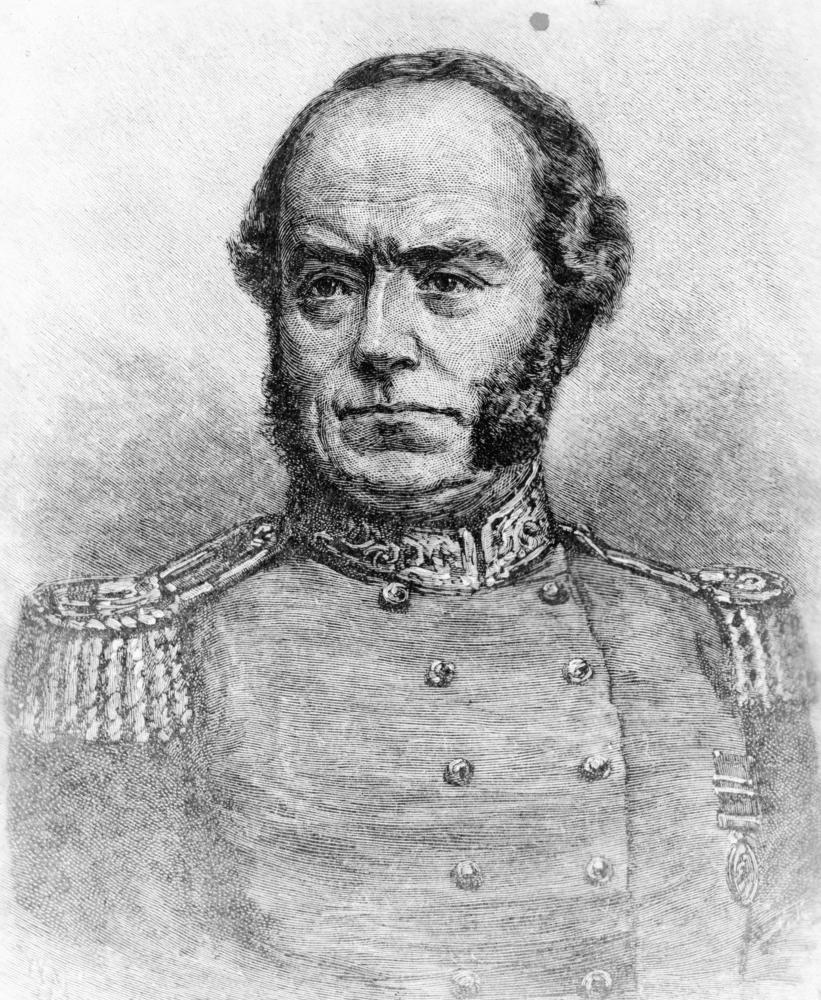
Engraving of Major Sir Thomas Mitchell

In 1837, Mitchell sought 18 months leave from his position and in March he left Sydney for London. During his leave, he published an account of his explorations called Three Expeditions into the Interior of Eastern Australia: with descriptions of the recently explored region of Australia Felix, and of the present colony of New South Wales. Mitchell sought additional periods of leave and finally arrived back in Australia in 1841. Mitchell left Sydney again in March 1847 on another period of leave. By the time he arrived back in mid-1848, he had published his Journal of an Expedition into the Interior of Tropical Australia, in search of a route from Sydney to the Gulf of Carpentaria.

Mitchell's journals proved a rich source for historians and anthropologists, with their close and sympathetic observations of the Aboriginal peoples he had encountered. These publications made him the most celebrated Australian explorer of his day. But he was a difficult man to get on with, made evident by this passage made by Governor Charles Augustus FitzRoy:

"It is notorious that Sir Thomas Mitchell's unfortunate impracticability of temper and spirit of opposition of those in authority over him misled him into frequent collision with my predecessors."

In a by-election for the Electoral district of Port Phillip in April 1844, Mitchell was elected to the New South Wales Legislative Council. He found it difficult to separate his roles of government employee and elected member of the legislature, and after only five months he resigned from the Legislative Council.

=== Duel ===
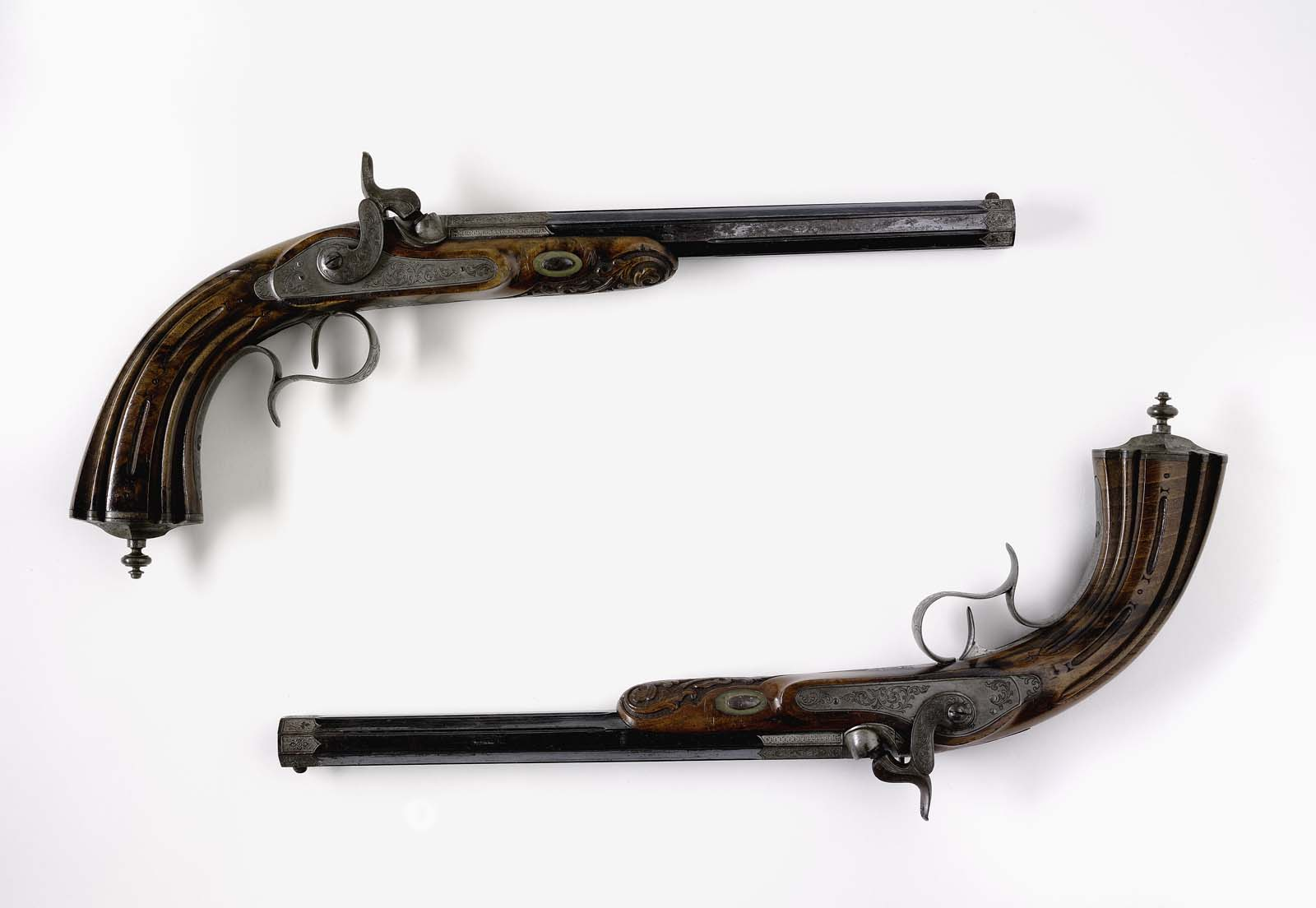
The pair of French .50 calibre pistols used in the duel, now held at the National Museum of Australia

Mitchell is also remembered as the last person in Australia to challenge anyone to a duel. In September 1851, Mitchell issued a challenge to Sir Stuart Alexander Donaldson (later Premier of New South Wales) because Donaldson had publicly criticised excessive spending by the Surveyor General's Department. The duel took place in Sydney on 27 September, with both duellists missing their marks; only Donaldson's hat was damaged. The French 50 calibre pistols used in the duel are in the collection of the National Museum of Australia.

== Ophir gold fields ==
In 1851, Mitchell was instructed by Governor FitzRoy to make a report on, and survey of, "the extent and productiveness of the goldfield reported to have been discovered in the County of Bathurst." He travelled west during winter to visit the Ophir gold diggings, accompanied by his son, Roderick, and Samuel Stutchbury the government geologist.

In June 1851 Mitchell selected the site for the township of Ophir. W.R. Davidson plotted a survey of the ground and Mitchell planned the streets and allotments for the town.

Mitchell returned with a collection of specimens from the diggings, mostly quartz, with 48 of these stored in a wooden chest. His report of the goldfields was presented to the Legislative Council in February 1852.

== Story of the "bomerang" propeller ==
The search for a method of screw propulsion of ships intrigued many inventors during the latter half of the 18th century and the beginning of the 19th. An Englishman, K. P. Smith, patented a screw propeller in 1836, and shortly afterwards Captain John Ericsson, formerly an officer of the Swedish army, patented another.

On his travels, Mitchell must have been evolving the idea of his boomerang propeller—he spelled it "bomerang", while newspapers used "bomarang" and "boomerang". The first test was made in the Sydney Harbour in May 1852, an iron propeller being fitted to the "screw-steamer" Keera. The results of this trial were considered satisfactory, the ship's progress being calculated on two runs at 10 and a little over 12 knots, and Sir Thomas Mitchell took his invention to England. In 1853 the propeller was fitted to the Genova, and a trial was conducted on the Mersey. Then the Admiralty gave it a test on HMS Conflict. The Genova ran at 9.5 knots as against 8.5 with a screw propeller, and the Conflict 9.25 knots as against the screw propeller 8.75, and at a lower engine speed. The "boomerang" propeller can be simply described as a "screw" propeller with much of the blades close to the shaft, which contribute little to propulsion but much to drag, cut away, a principle which is well understood today.

== Family life ==
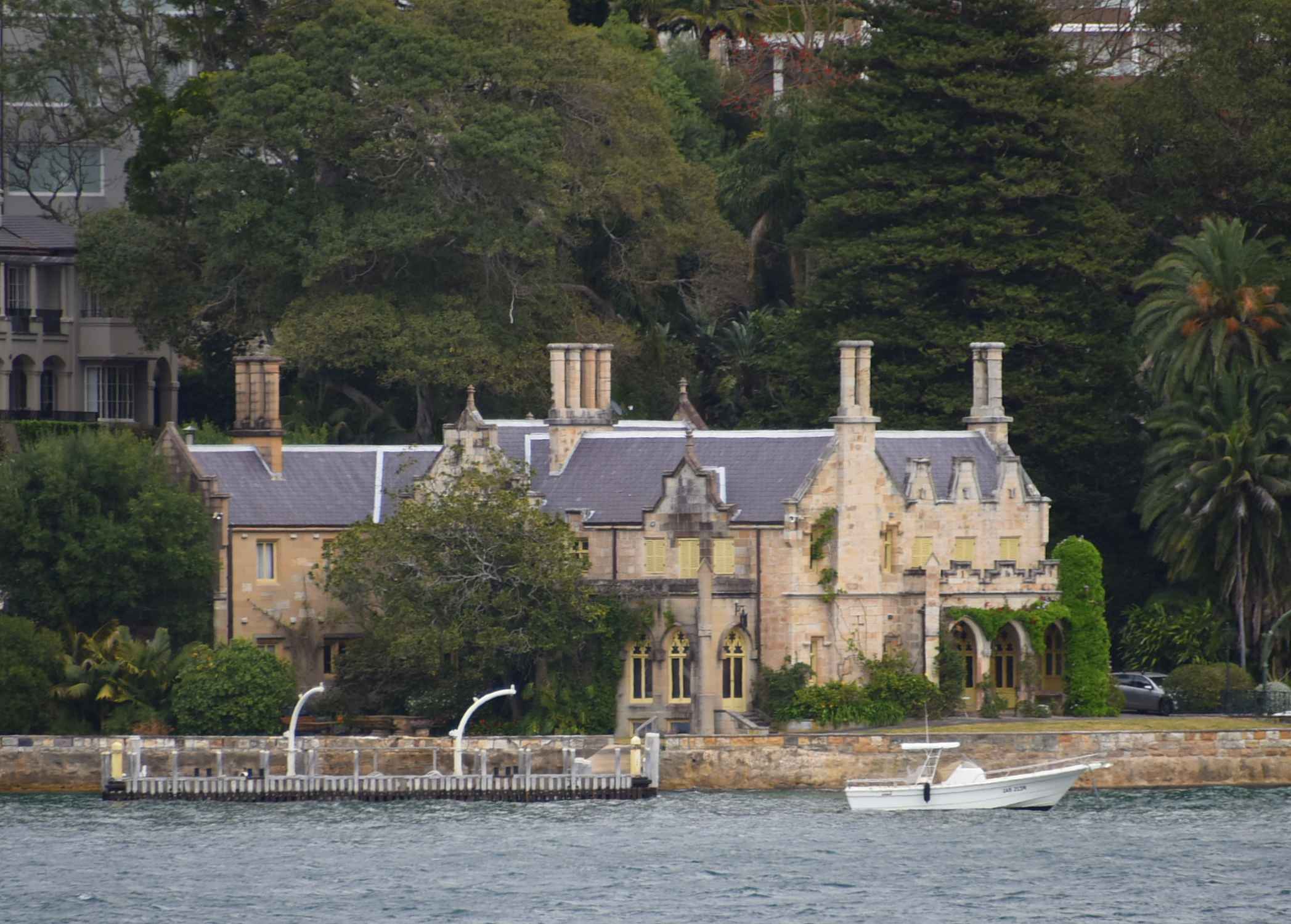
Carthona, Mitchell's home in Darling Point

Thomas and Mary Mitchell had twelve children: Livingstone, Roderick, Murray, Campbell, Thomas, Richard, Georgina, Maria, Emily, Camilla, Alicia, Blanche. Georgina and Maria died young, and Murray before 1847. Roderick became a Commissioner of Crown Lands and head of the Border Police in the Liverpool Plains district. Roderick was drowned during the last years of Mitchell's life. Campbell discovered oil shale deposits and attempted to establish oil shale and coal mines; he died in 1883.

Son Richard Blunt Mitchell (c. 1857 – 10 June 1916) became a clerk of petty sessions in the Molong area in 1858, before returning in 1881 to Scotland after receiving a large inheritance on the death of his uncle and namesake Richard Blunt, settling in Peeblesshire.

Camilla Victoria Mitchell married surveyor John Frederick Mann. Their son Gother Victor Fyers Mann was a prominent painter.

His family enjoyed a privileged upbringing, and Blanche Mitchell, his youngest daughter, recorded her daily activities and social life in childhood diaries and notebooks. Her sister Emily married George Edward Thicknesse-Touchet, 21st Baron Audley.

In 1841, Mitchell completed his new Gothic home, Carthona, on the water's edge in Darling Point, Sydney.

Following Mitchell's death, his family moved to Craigend Terrace in Woolloomooloo.

== Death ==
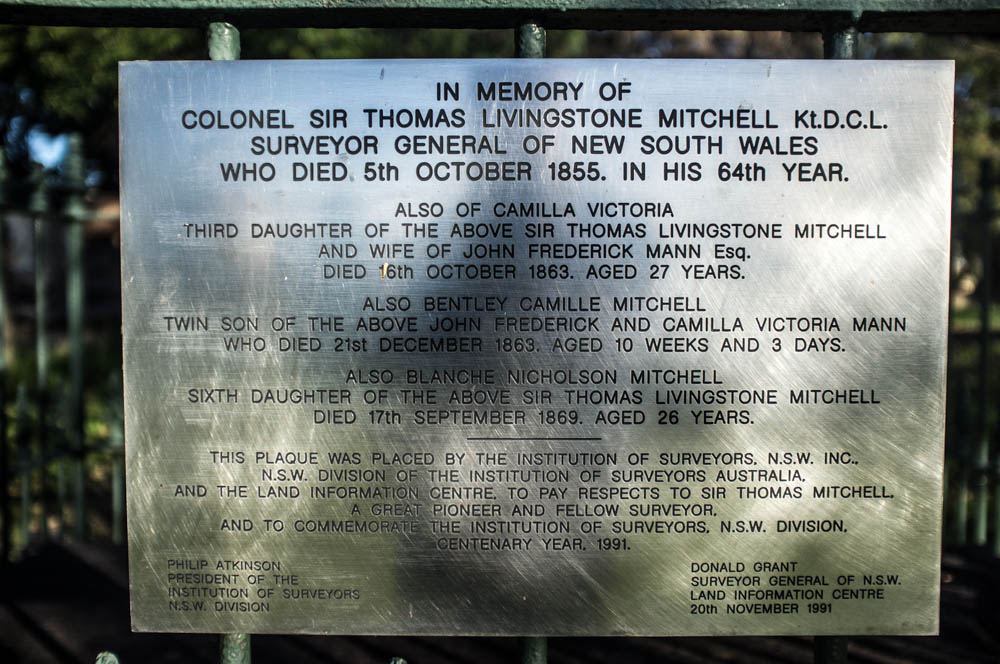
Thomas Mitchell Plaque, Camperdown

In July 1855 a Royal Commission was appointed to inquire into the New South Wales Survey Department, but Mitchell did not live to see the report. While surveying the line of road between Nelligen and Braidwood, he developed a chill which led to a severe attack of bronchitis. He died a few days later at Carthona at Darling Point at 5:15 pm 5 October 1855. Newspapers of the day commented:

For a period of twenty-eight years Sir Thomas Mitchell had served the Colony, much of that service having been exceedingly arduous and difficult. Among the early explorers of Australia his name will occupy an honoured place in the estimation of posterity.

He is buried at Camperdown Cemetery, Newtown, with his grave being maintained by the Seniors Group of Surveyors.

His wife Lady Mary Thomson Mitchell died on 21 December 1883.

== Naming ==
Some of the places Mitchell named on his expeditions were: the Avoca River, Balonne River, Belyando River, Campaspe River, Cogoon River, Discovery Bay, Glenelg River, Grampians, Maranoa River, Mount Arapiles, Mount King, Mount Macedon, Mount Napier, Mount William, Nyngan, Pyramid Hill, St George, Swan Hill and Wimmera River.

== Commemoration ==
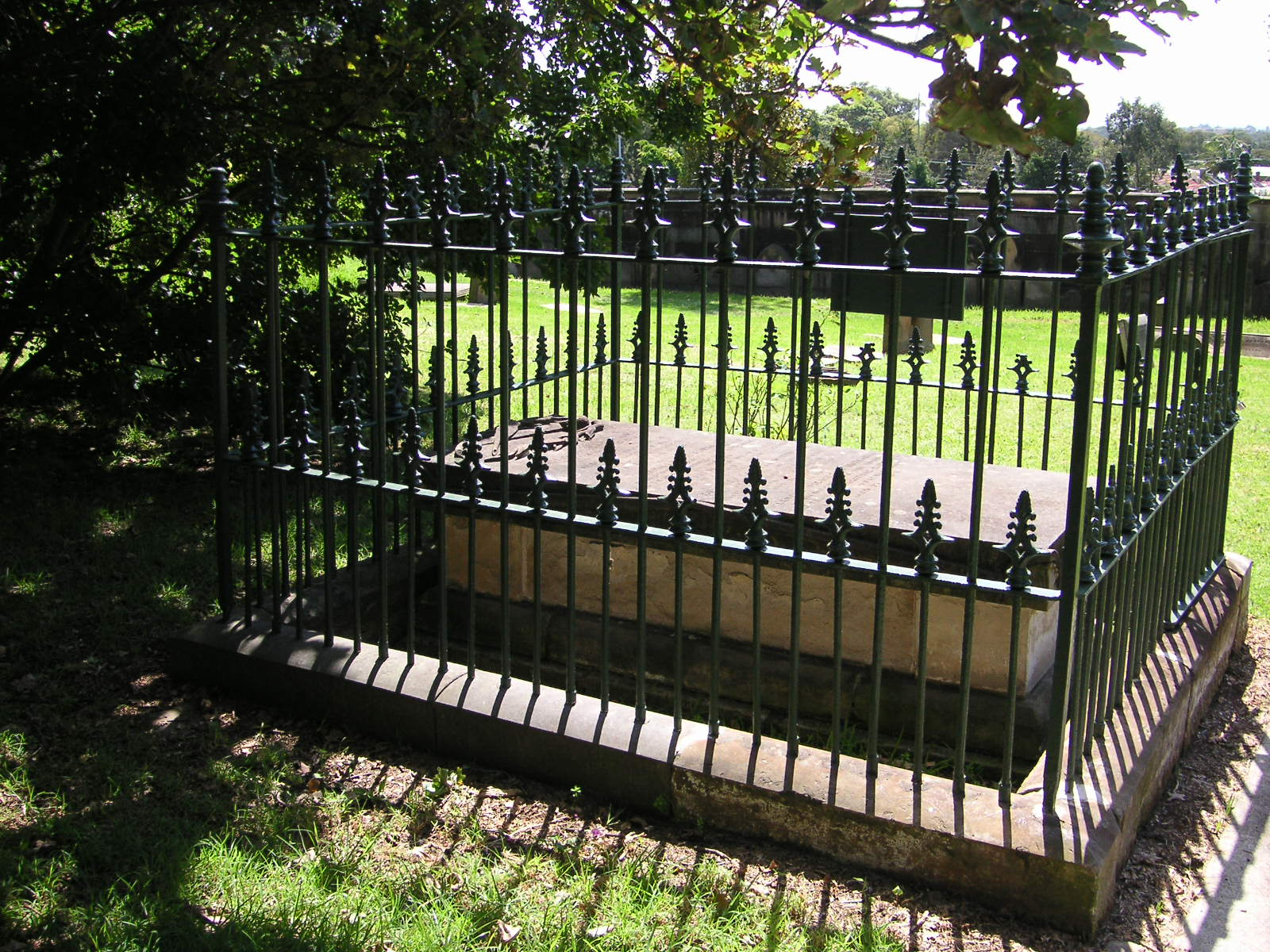
The grave of Major Mitchell, Surveyor General

Because of his contributions in the surveying and exploration of Australia, Mitchell is commemorated by having numerous localities or objects across Australia being named after him. These include:

- The Sir Thomas Mitchell Clock in Blackall, Queensland
- The town of Mitchell in Queensland
- The Mitchell River in Queensland
- The Canberra suburb of Mitchell
- The electorate of Mitchell
- The Mitchell Highway
- The Major Mitchell's cockatoo, a species of cockatoo
- Mitchellstown in Victoria.
- A local government area in Victoria, Shire of Mitchell
- Steam locomotive number S 301 Sir Thomas Mitchell, a member of the Victorian Railways S class locomotives. In turn, Mitchell House at Seymour Technical High School, the town with the loco depot which serviced the famous four locos. Later, the name was carried by the diesel S301.
- Mitchell grass, common name of the small genus of grass species dominant across much of the arid areas of the continent
- Mitchell's hopping mouse, an Australian native rodent-like animal
- Countless roadside locations in Victoria have a memorial erected "Major Mitchell passed here".
- Sir Thomas Mitchell Road, Villawood
- Sir Thomas Mitchell Road, Bondi Beach
- Sir Thomas Mitchell Drive, Bowenfels linking the Great Western Highway with the Cox River at a fitting memorial to colonial road builders.

Mitchell is also the namesake in the highest honor of the New South Wales Surveyors Awards, the Sir Thomas Mitchell Excellence in Surveying Award.

Mitchell and his expeditions are commemorated by numerous memorials, in New South Wales, Victoria, and Queensland.

A map of the expedition of Major Sir Thomas Mitchell into the country between the Maranoa and Mount Mudge and the River Victoria, 1848 was ranked #38 in the "Top 150: Documenting Queensland" exhibition when it toured to venues around Queensland from February 2009 to April 2010. The exhibition was part of Queensland State Archives' events and exhibition program which contributed to the state's Q150 celebrations, marking the 150th anniversary of the separation of Queensland from New South Wales.

== Manuscript collections ==
- Mitchell, Thomas. "Sir Thomas Mitchell sketches and papers relating to the 1807-1814 Peninsular War" (1824–1843) [Sketch Book]. Sir Thomas Mitchell collection of drawings, portraits and manuscripts, ca.1830-1880, Series: DL PX5. NSW, Aus: Dixson Collection, State Library of New South Wales.
- Mitchell, Thomas. "Sir Thomas Mitchell - Papers" (ca. 1838-1880) [Textual Records]. Sir Thomas Mitchell collection of drawings, portraits and manuscripts, ca.1830-1880, Series: MLMSS 7076. NSW, Aus: Dixson Collection, State Library of New South Wales.
- Mitchell, Thomas. "Sir Thomas Mitchell school books, textbooks and Bible" (1708–1812) [10 volumes]. Sir Thomas Mitchell - Papers, 1708-1855, Series: C 01-C 10. NSW, Aus: Mitchell Collection, State Library of New South Wales.
- Mitchell, Thomas. "Sir Thomas Mitchell notebooks and Spanish and Portuguese field books" (ca. 1811-1848) [11 volumes]. Sir Thomas Mitchell - Papers, 1708-1855, Series: C 11-C 21. NSW, Aus: Mitchell Collection, State Library of New South Wales.
- Mitchell, Thomas. "Sir Thomas Mitchell field books, sketchbooks and expedition journals" (1828–1855) [17 volumes]. Sir Thomas Mitchell - Papers, 1708-1855, Series: C 40-C 56. NSW, Aus: Mitchell Collection, State Library of New South Wales.
- Mitchell, Thomas. "Sir Thomas Mitchell diaries, field books, sketchbooks, expedition journals and other papers" (1839–1855) [11 volumes]. Sir Thomas Mitchell - Papers, 1708-1855, Series: C 57-C 67. NSW, Aus: Mitchell Collection, State Library of New South Wales.
- Mitchell, Thomas. "Sir Thomas Mitchell diaries" (1847–1855) [09 volumes]. Sir Thomas Mitchell - Papers, 1708-1855, Series: C 68-C 76. NSW, Aus: Mitchell Collection, State Library of New South Wales.
- Mitchell, Thomas. "Sir Thomas Mitchell notebooks, sketchbooks, and miscellaneous papers" (ca. 1823-1853) [13 volumes]. Sir Thomas Mitchell - Papers, 1708-1855, Series: C 68-C 76. NSW, Aus: Mitchell Collection, State Library of New South Wales.

== See also ==
- Category:Taxa named by Thomas Mitchell (explorer)
- Charles Sturt
- Great North Road (Australia)
- History of New South Wales
- New South Wales gold rush
- Nineteen Counties
- Surveyor General of New South Wales

Preceded by John Oxley	Surveyor General of New South Wales; 1828–1855	Succeeded by George Barney
New South Wales Legislative Council
Preceded by Alexander Thomson	Member for Port Phillip; 1844; Served alongside: Thomas Walker, Charles Nicholson, Adolphus Young, John Dunmore Lang	Succeeded by Benjamin Boyd
