= George Barney =

British colonial governor

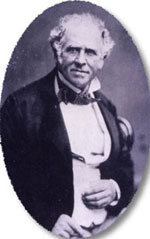
- George Barney, c. 1860
- Born: 19 May 1792; Wolverhampton, Staffordshire, England
- Died: 16 April 1862 (aged 69); St Leonards, New South Wales
- Relatives: Joseph Barney (father); Maria Jane Scott (daughter)
- Military career
- Allegiance: United Kingdom of Great Britain and Ireland
- Branch: Board of Ordnance
- Years of service: 1808–1846
- Rank: Lieutenant Colonel
- Service number: 402
- Unit: Corps of Royal Engineers
- Commands: CRE, New South Wales, 1835–43; CRE, Athlone District, 1845; CRE, Woolwich, 1846
- Campaigns: Napoleonic Wars; Peninsular War; Siege of Tarifa; Capture of Les Saintes; Invasion of Guadeloupe
- Memorials: Memorial to Lieutenant Colonel George Barney, Bligh & Barney Reserve, The Rocks, Sydney
- Other work: Colonial Engineer, 1835–44; Superintendent North Australia, 1846–47; Chief Commissioner of Crown Lands, 1849–55; Member of the Legislative Assembly, 1851–56; Surveyor General, 1855–59

Lieutenant Colonel George Barney (19 May 1792 – 16 April 1862) was a military engineer of the Corps of Royal Engineers and became Lieutenant Governor of the Colony of North Australia.

== Early life ==
George Barney was born in Wolverhampton, Staffordshire, England, the son of Joseph Barney, drawing master at the Royal Military Academy, Woolwich, England, and Jane, née Chandler (or Chambers). He entered the army at 16 as second lieutenant in the Royal Engineers. He served in the Peninsular War and in the West Indies. He had several years experience of civil engineering in Jamaica. He was promoted to captain in 1825.

== Career in Australia ==
=== Military enginner ===
From 1835 a number of Royal Engineer officers with a detachment of the Corps of Royal Sappers and Miners were sent out to New South Wales and Van Diemen's Land, Australia. Captain George Barney, Commanding Royal Engineer of New South Wales, arrived at Sydney on the British Sovereign with his wife and three children on 15 December 1835. He was followed in by Lieutenant Henry Williamson Lugard, RE, on the Hive and Tamar on 16 December, and their Clerk of Works, George Graham, and his family in 1836.

=== Works ===
The following civil engineering and building works are associated with George Baney:

- Circular Quay - Reclamation of land and construction of the original semi-circular quay.
- Fort Denison - Barney designed the fort
- Victoria Barracks - Work began under Barney's supervision in 1841.
- Wollongong harbour works

=== Politics ===
Barney was appointed a member of the New South Wales Legislative Council from 17 July 1843, but resigned in August 1843.

=== Business ===
From 1841, he became chairman of the board of the Gasllght Company, and a trustee of the Savings Bank of New South Wales.

== Late life ==
Barney was appointed successively chief commissioner of crown lands on 1 January 1849, and Surveyor General of New South Wales on 11 October 1855. He was again appointed a member of the Legislative Council from 13 October 1851 to 29 February 1856.

He was married to Portia Henrietta Peale. One of their daughters, Maria Jane Scott, was a painter and novelist.

He died at Sydney on 16 April 1862.

== Legacy ==
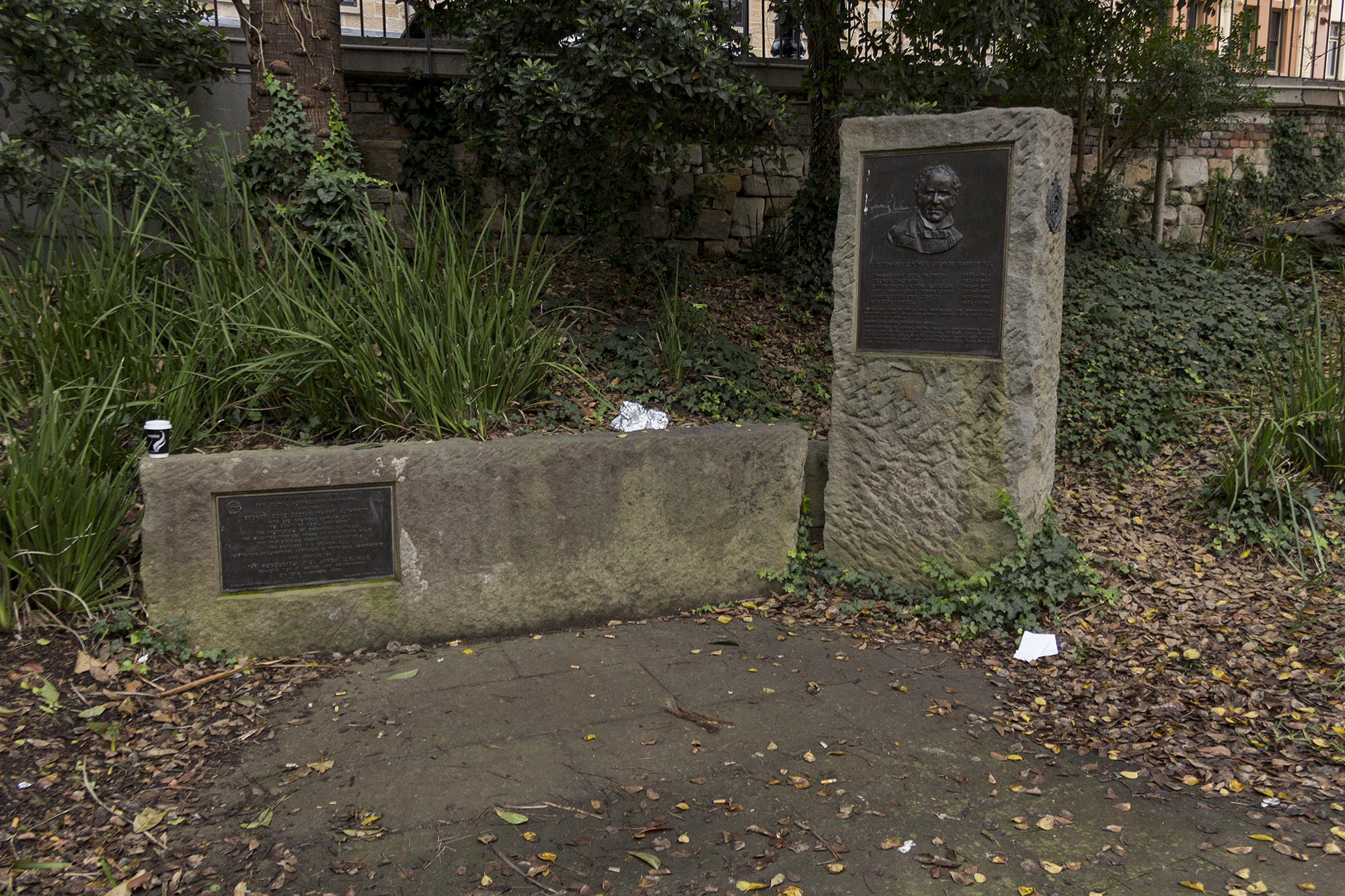
Memorial to Lieutenant Colonel George Barney, RE, at The Rocks, Sydney

Barney's North Sydney house, Wotonga, was later acquired by the Commonwealth and, after extensions, became Admiralty House, the Sydney residence of the Governor-General of Australia.

There is a monument to George Barney in The Rocks, Sydney (33.859013°S 151.209041°E).

Mount Barney in the Scenic Rim Region of Queensland is named after him.

The suburb of Barney Point in Gladstone, Queensland is named after him.

Government offices
New office	Commander of the Royal Engineers and Colonial Engineer; 1836–1843	Succeeded by Lieutenant-Colonel James Gordon as commander of the Royal Engineers
Preceded by Thomas Mitchell	Surveyor General of New South Wales; 1855–1859	Succeeded by Alexander Grant McLean
New South Wales Legislative Council
New parliament	Appointed member Jul - Aug 1843	Succeeded by John Plunkett
New parliament	Appointed member Oct 1851 - Feb 1856	Council replaced by new Parliament
