= Walker Rannie Davidson =

Australian politician

- Born: March 1808; Scotland
- Died: 20 November 1876 (aged 68); Deniliquin
- Occupation: Surveyor

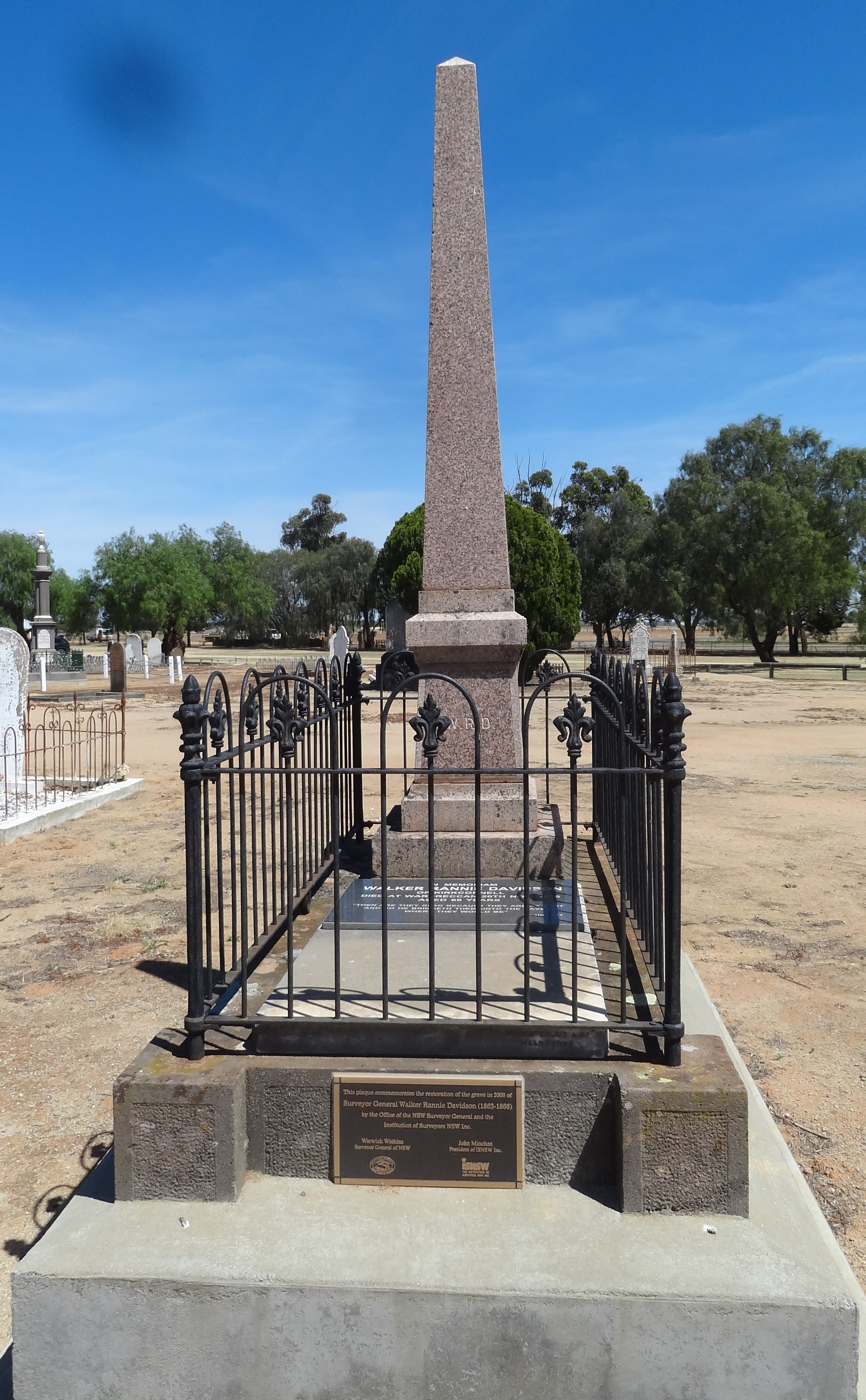
Surveyor General Walker Rennie Davidson

Walker Rannie Davidson (1808 – 20 November 1876) was a Surveyor General of New South Wales, (then a colony, now a state of Australia)

== Early life ==
Davidson was born in Perthshire, Scotland. Son of James Davidson and Mary Butty, he was Christened at Perth, Scotland, on March 15 1808.

Davidson immigrated to Australia in 1829, aged 21, and married Christianna Sarah Murray seven years later on July 19 1836, at St James Church, Sydney, and had nine children.

== Career in Australia ==
Davidson was Surveyor General of New South Wales 1862 to 1868, succeeding Alexander Grant McLean. Davidson was succeeded by Philip Francis Adams as Surveyor General.

Preceded by Alexander Grant McLean	Surveyor General of New South Wales; 1864–1868	Succeeded by Philip Francis Adams
