= John Mitchell Mitchell =

Scottish antiquarian

- Born: 1789; Falkirk, Scotland
- Died: 24 April 1865 (aged 75–76)
- Occupation: Antiquarian
- Relatives: Thomas Mitchell (brother)

John Mitchell Mitchell (1789 – 24 April 1865) was a Scottish antiquarian. The explorer Thomas Mitchell was his brother.

== Biography ==
Mitchell was the second son of John Mitchell of Falkirk, where he was born in 1789. Sir Thomas Livingstone Mitchell was his brother. He was educated at the Polmont school in Falkirk, and subsequently at the University of Edinburgh. For nearly half a century he was engaged in business as a merchant at Leith, and for some time acted as consul-general for Belgium. Nevertheless, Mitchell found time for the study of archaeology, natural history, and mineralogy, and was a student of Scandinavian languages and literature. He was fellow (and joint secretary for its foreign correspondence) of the Society of Antiquaries of Scotland, of the Royal Physical Society, and the Royal Society of Northern Antiquaries of Denmark, contributing to the 'Transactions' of each many valuable papers. He lived on terms of friendly intercourse with the king of Denmark and the king of the Belgians, and received from the latter the gold medal of the order of Leopold. Mitchell died at his residence, Mayville, Trinity, near Edinburgh, on 24 April 1865. He was unmarried.

Mitchell's chief works were: 1. 'Mesehowe: Illustrations of the Runic Literature of Scandinavia,' Edinburgh, 1863, 4to, including translations in Danish and English of inscriptions found in the mound of Mesehowe in Orkney, opened in 1861. 2. 'The Herring, its Natural History and National Importance,' Edinburgh, 1864, 8vo, an elaborate work, embodying the study and research of many years, and constituting an authority on the subject to which it relates; it is an expansion of a paper which gained the medal offered by the Royal Scottish Society of Arts. He was also author of a pamphlet 'On British Commercial Legislation in reference to the Tariff on Import Duties, and the injustice of interfering with the Navigation Laws,' Edinburgh, 1849, 8vo; 2nd edition, 1852.
