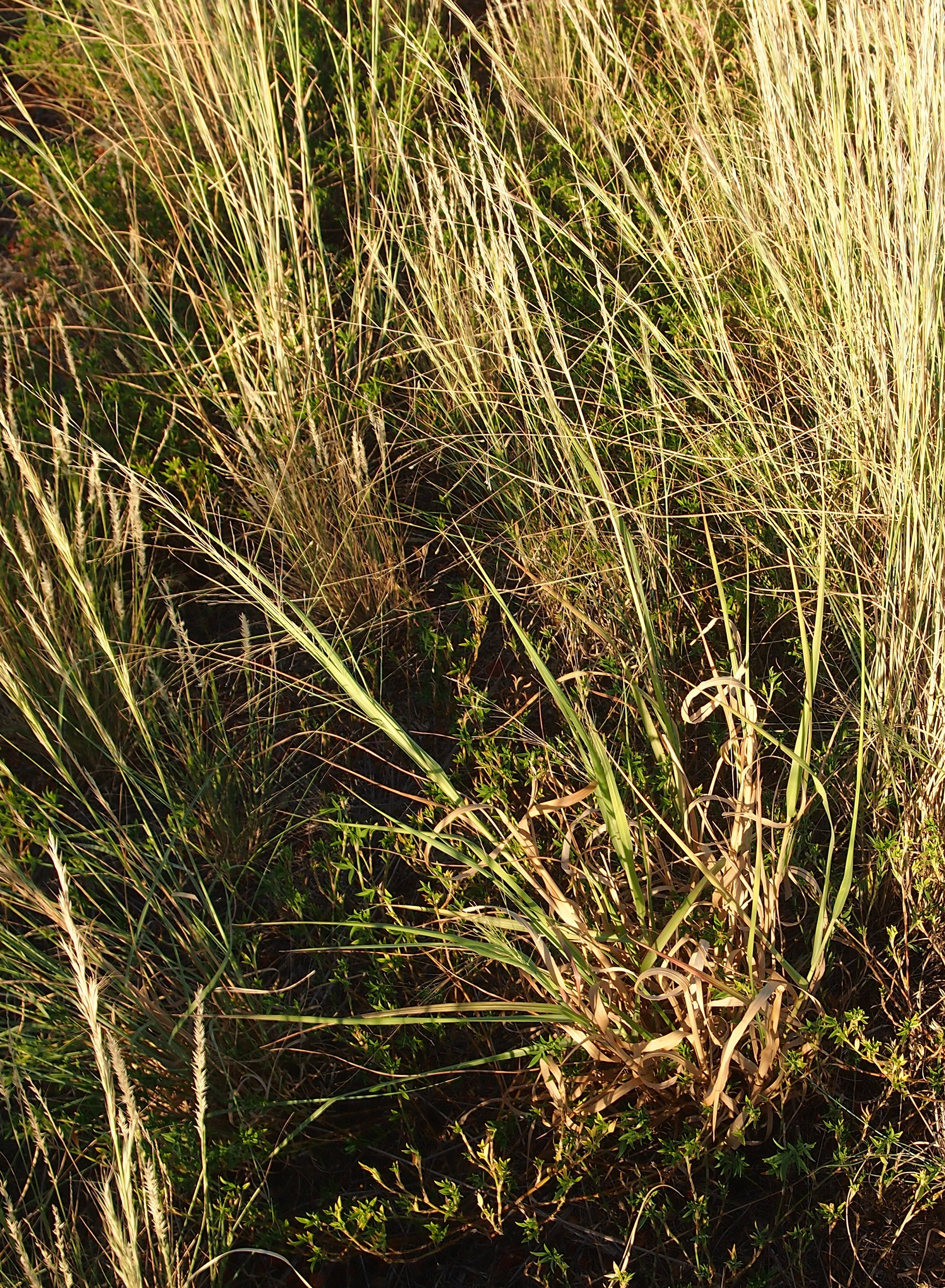

Scientific classification
- Kingdom: Plantae
- Clade: Tracheophytes
- Clade: Angiosperms
- Clade: Monocots
- Clade: Commelinids
- Order: Poales
- Family: Poaceae
- Subfamily: Panicoideae
- Genus: Panicum
- Species: P. decompositum

Binomial name
- Panicum decompositum R.Br.

= Panicum decompositum =

Species of plant

Panicum decompositum, known by the common names native millet, native panic, Australian millet, papa grass, and umbrella grass, is a species of perennial grass native to the inland of Australia. It occurs in every mainland state. The seeds can be cultivated to produce flour typically used in Aboriginal bushfood. The species is also considered to have relatively high palatability by livestock, making it suitable for grazing pastures.

== Description ==
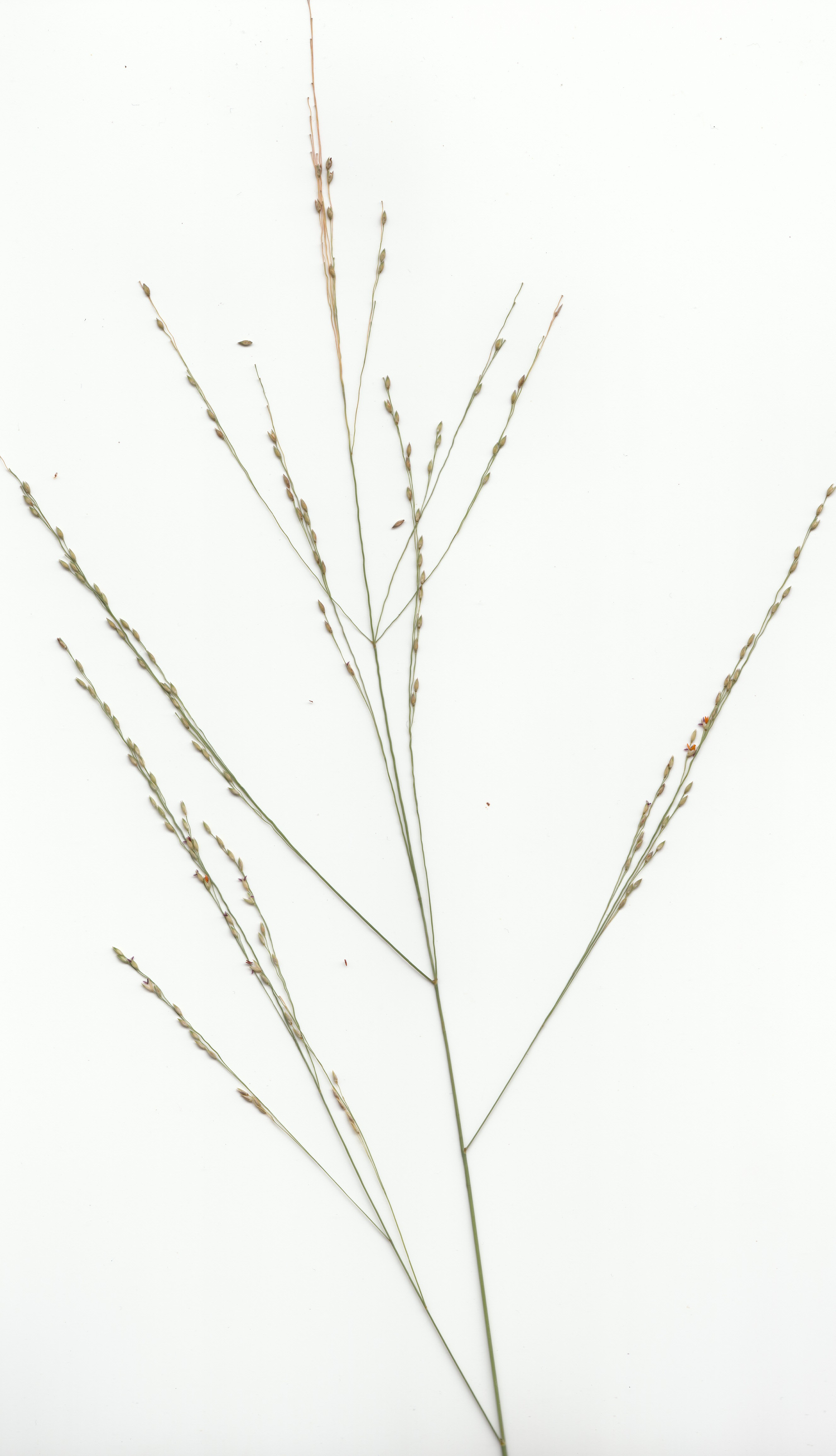
Open panicle structure of Panicum decompositum seed-heads.

Native millet is specifically a C4 tussock forming perennial with glabrous blue-green blade-like leaves with a pale line running down the middle on the front of the leaves and a protruding spine, known as the keel, at the back of the leaves. The grass can grow up to 145 cm tall with seed heads that can grow up to approximately 40 cm in length.

Native millet is hermaphroditic, which means it contains both the male and female reproductive organs in the same flower. The seed head has an open panicle structure which consists of multiple small branches loosely clustered together. At the end of each small branch is a spikelet that would flower and mature into seeds. The species flowers in summer and autumn (approximately from December to May in Australia) and the main method of pollination is via wind.

Native millet, along with other grasses, grow fibrous roots which retains the surrounding soil and prevent erosion. The fibrous roots also increase the overall biomass in the soil which provides an environment for microorganisms and promote the filtration of chemical compounds in water runoff such as fertilisers or pesticides.

== Seed dispersal ==
The main mode of seed dispersal for native panic is wind. As the seeds mature and dry out, the spikelets can easily break off with adequate wind and get blown away. The dried spikelets, and dried, dead stalks can easily form clusters and become a fire hazard. This issue is usually managed with backburning, a practice often used to reduce the fuel available to bushfires during the drier seasons.

== Ecology ==
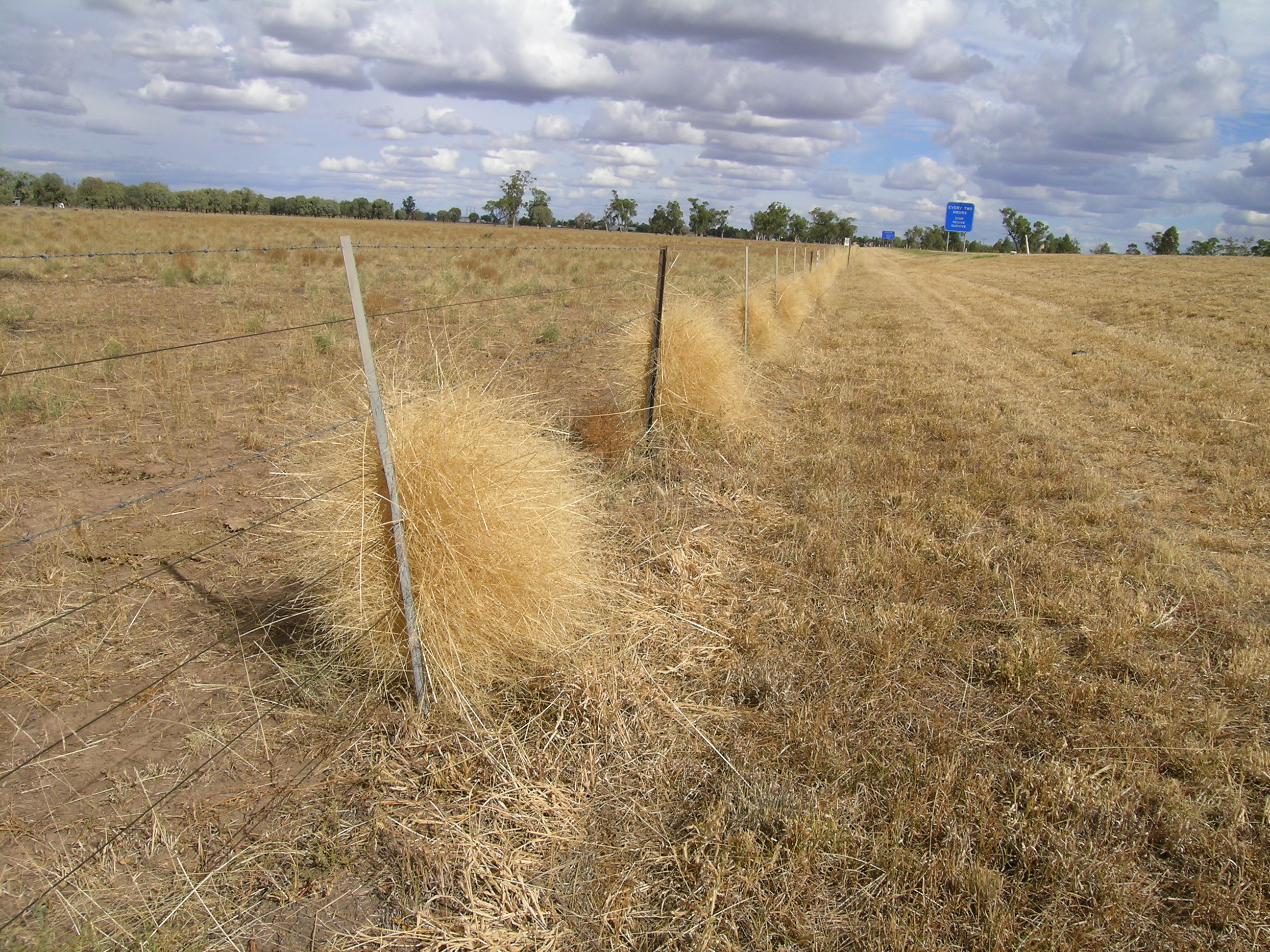
Dried seed-heads of native millet collect around fences which can become a fire-hazard.

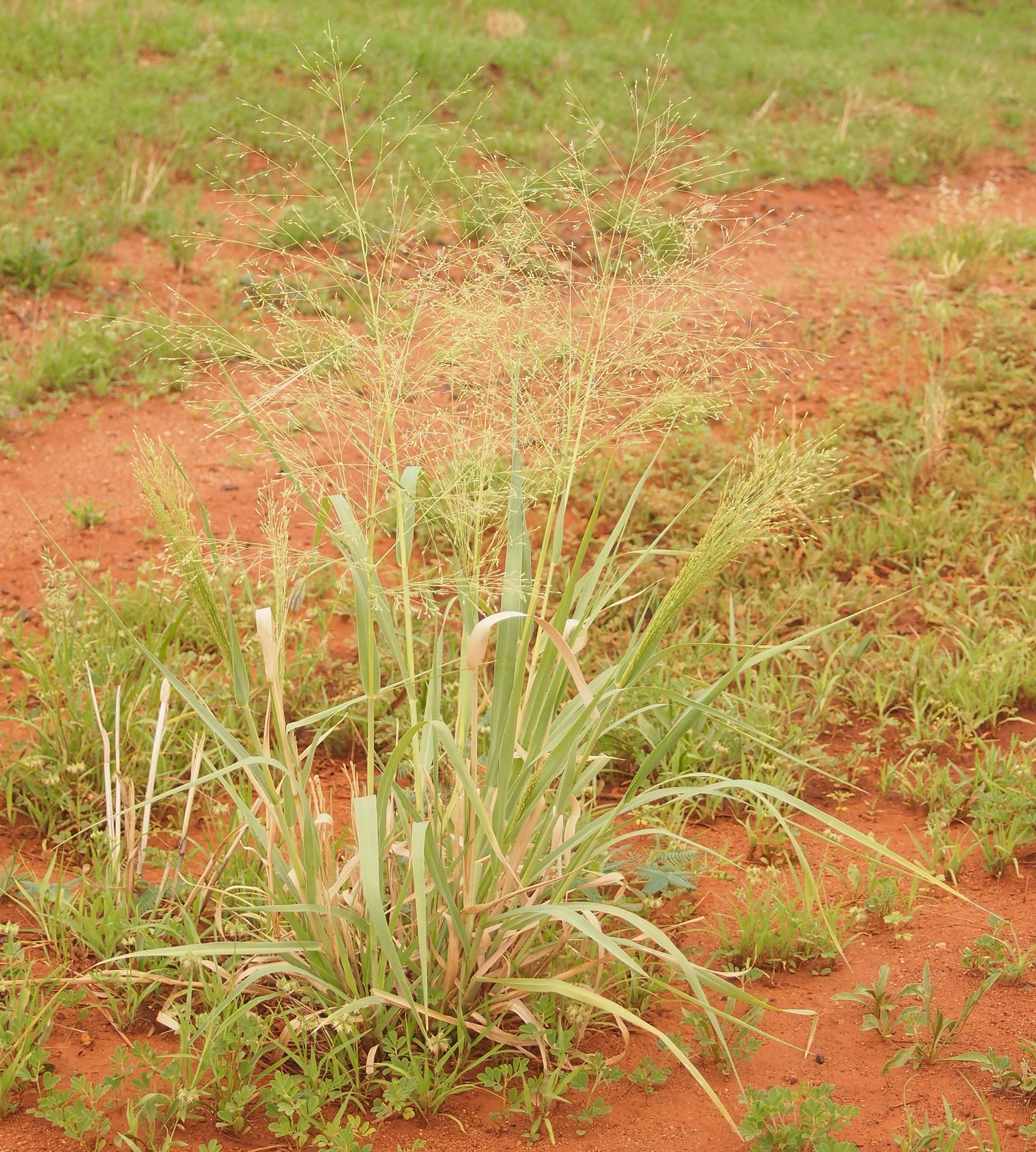
Native millet typically grows in sandy and clay laden soil.

Native millet can tolerate a wide variety of soils but prefers wetter soils with high clay and sand content, also known as alluvial soil. Native millet is widely spread, growing evenly on pastures rather than forming dominant stands or single bushes. The species is resistant to both drought and flooding conditions. Native millet has been shown to be able to withstand prolonged periods of flooding with minimal effects on normal plant characteristics with the exception of slowed seedling growth. The species is sensitive to frost and often hays-off or stops producing seeds prematurely during the winter months. Native millet can quickly repopulate during spring.

== Uses ==
=== Bushfood ===
Native millet is a staple food of outback Aboriginal people, who hand-harvest the seed to make bush bread. The seeds, harvested in large quantities, by stacking and burning and then collecting the fallen seeds, possibly on a drop blanket made out of animal skin. The seeds can be collected dry, combined with other native seeds such as wattle seeds and spinifex (Triodia) grass seeds to produce flour. The seed heads usually contain adequate moisture to produce a dough when grounded dry, otherwise, a small amount of water can be added to form a thick and sticky paste. The dough can be consumed raw or formed into a loaf or a bun and cooked on hot coal to produce damper bread, also known as bush bread, seed cake, or soda bread. Bush bread is often carried on group travels as a source of energy. Native millet, as well as other native grasses such as kangaroo grass, are being incorporated into modern baking in some small Australian bakeries as a wheat or rye flour alternative.

=== Agriculture ===
Farmers also highly prize the grass as pasture for stock. Native millet has moderate to high grazing value with 2.2–10.6% crude protein and considered relatively palatable by livestock. Due to its resistance to flooding, the grass is can produce high volumes of feed in floodplains after heavy rains or floods during the summer months. Native millet can withstand high livestock volumes but is best managed with rotational grazing with at most 40% pasture utilisation, that is, the percentage of pasture consumed at any one time. Overgrowth of feed can lead to decay at the base of the pastures which can decrease palatability. The growth of native millet on sandy soils usually indicates a light grazing pressure or a lower volume of livestock. However, the growth of native millet on clay-laden soil can indicate heavy grazing as a result of overstocking. The germination rate of native millet has been found to increase from the exposure to plant-derived smoke. This indicates possible benefits from backburning or sowing smoke-treated native millet seeds for setting up pastures either for livestock or seed cultivation.

== Toxicity ==
Some species of the genus Panicum such as Panicum dichotomiflorum are known to cause hepatogenous photosensitisation in ruminant livestock such as sheep. This occurs when the build up of phylloerythrin, a photosentising agent, in the gut reaches the skin and cause a phototoxic reaction which can lead to burning, blisters, or lesions of the skin. P. decompositum has been suspected to be poisonous in association with similar photosensitisation causing species, however, no specific cases were confirmed.

== Distribution ==
There are two variations of native millet. P. decompositum var. decompositum is native and only occurs in the state of Victoria, while P. decompositum var. tenuis occurs in all other mainland states, in particular, the Northern Territory, Queensland, South Australia, and New South Wales. Very few sightings have been reported for the state of South Australia and neither variations are found in Tasmania.

Native millet is amongst the intermediate species of alluvial Mitchell grassland of the Kimberly region of Western Australia. Mitchell grasslands are known for their black soil due to the high clay and silt content.
