= Joseph Barney =

British painter and engraver

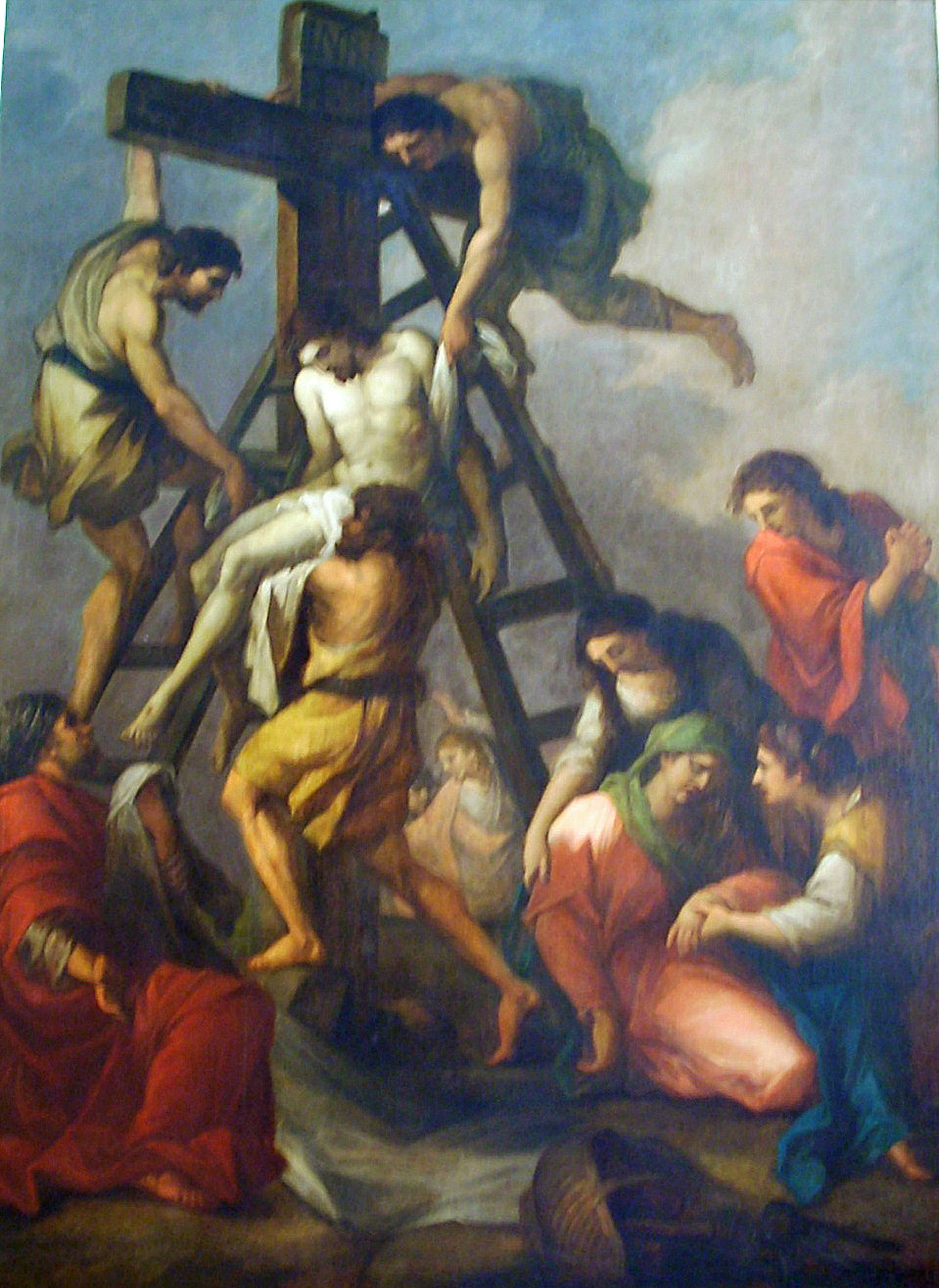
Deposition from the Cross (1781)

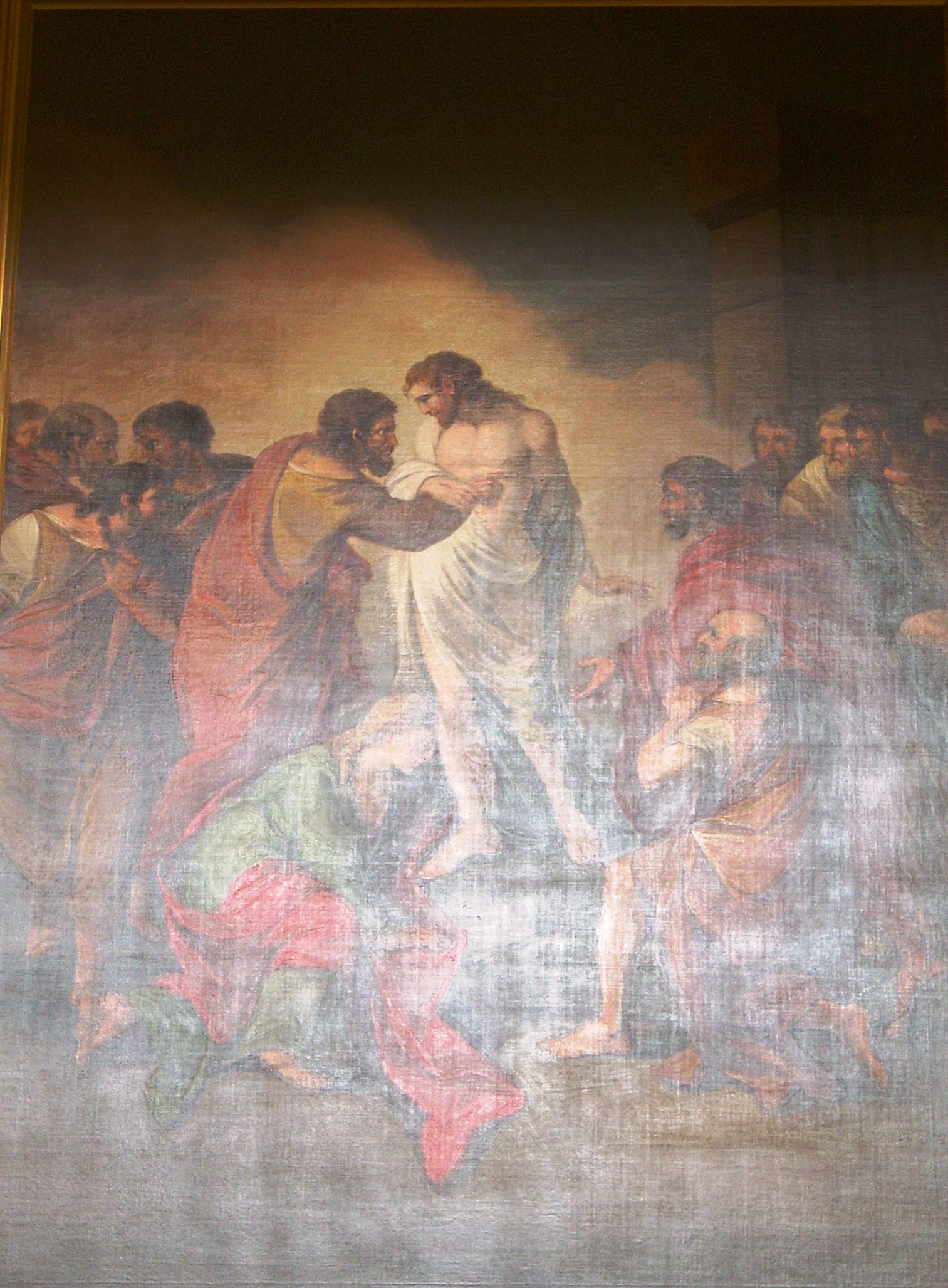
The Apparition of Our Lord to St. Thomas (1784)

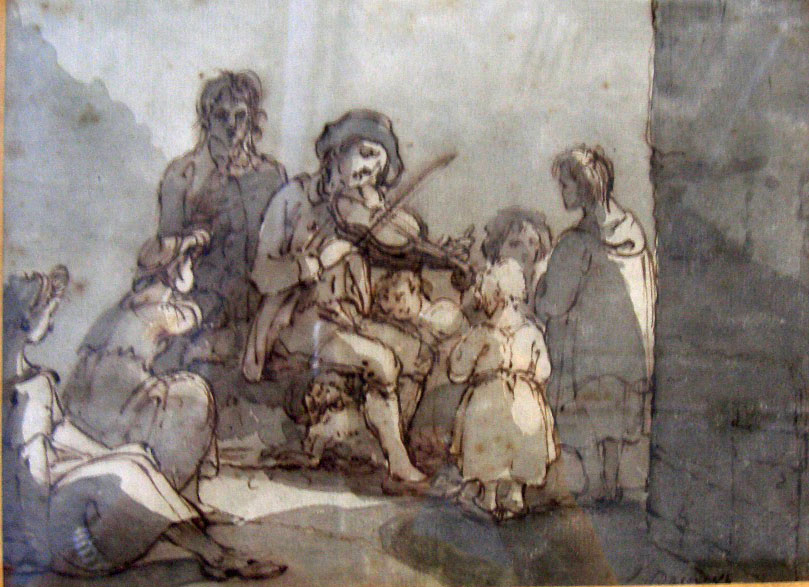
JA Blind Musician (1780s)

Joseph Barney (1753 in Wolverhampton – 13 April 1832 in London), was a British painter and engraver. He is usually described as a pupil of Antonio Zucchi and Angelica Kauffman and as a fruit and flower painter to the Prince Regent.

Two of his large-scale paintings — altarpieces The Deposition from the Cross (1781) and The Apparition of Our Lord to St Thomas (1784) are in Wolverhampton, and can be seen today at St John's church and at St Peter & St Paul's Roman Catholic church. During Barney's lifetime, his artistic achievements were respected and praised. In 1798, Stebbing Shaw, mentioning The Deposition from the Cross in his History of Staffordshire, called Barney a "native genius" of Wolverhampton. In the collection of Wolverhampton Art Gallery, there is a pen and ink drawing, A Blind Musician, which gives some additional idea of quality and versatility of Barney's works.

== Biography ==
=== Early years ===
Wolverhampton archival materials and other local documents identify Joseph Barney as a son of Joseph Barney Snr., a local japanner, and, from 1780–1802, a partner of the Barney & Ryton, japanners. His mother was Eleanor, née Denholm. Being a son of a japanner, he received some artistic training and indeed started his artistic career painting flowers which were a popular decoration for japanned ware.

=== Studying in London ===
Barney came to London from Wolverhampton before or in 1774, as in that year he received from the Royal Society of Arts "a Silver Palette for a drawing of flowers". Barney indeed studied with Zucchi some time between c.1774 and 1780, as in 1777 he exhibited at the Society of Artists "at Mr Zucchi's, John Street, Adelphi". But the statement in the Dictionary of National Biography - "studied under the Italian decorative painter Antonio Zucchi (1726–1795) and Angelica Kauffman (1741–1807), exhibiting from their London address in 1777" must be challenged. Angelica Kauffman did not share the home with Zucchi, and lived at 16, Golden Square, chaperoned by her father. Barney must have known Angelica as a co-founder of the Academy of Art, an extremely popular and successful artist, and his mentor's future wife. He obviously was much influenced by her works, but so far, there is no documentary evidence of Barney being a pupil of Angelica Kauffman.

During his lifetime, Barney exhibited more than hundred artworks at the Royal Academy and the British Institution. Their subjects demonstrate that the established description of Barney as "Fruit and Flower Painter" is inadequate. Only a small number of exhibited works are "flower pieces". The great majority of recorded Barney's works are religious, historic, literature, and genre paintings, which express his strong ambition to become a historic painter. While the Silver Palette of 1774 was given for his early flower designs, the Gold Palette was awarded to him in 1781 for his historical drawings.

=== Working for Matthew Boulton: mechanical paintings ===
Barney returned to Wolverhampton in about 1779, as in August 1779 he married Jane Whiston Chambers (or Chandler) at St John's chapel, Wolverhampton. In October 1780, their first child was born. It was imperative to obtain means to support his new family. No later than in November 1779 he started to collaborate with Matthew Boulton (1728–1809) and his Soho manufactory, assisting in the production of so-called mechanical paintings. His duties were to touch and finish in paint images of original paintings which were mechanically reproduced on paper or canvas. He worked on paintings after Sir Joshua Reynolds, Benjamin West, Joseph Wright of Derby, Antonio Zucchi and Angelica Kauffman. All paintings associated with Joseph Barney from the Soho period, be it mechanical or original, are figurative. Many of them, like Benjamin West's and Angelica Kauffman's works, are complex many-figures compositions.

Matthew Boulton and Josiah Wedgwood both possessed mechanical paintings finished by Barney. Other customers were Mrs Elizabeth Montagu (1718–1800), Sir Sampson Eardley, 1st Baron Eardley (1744–1824); possibly, Beilby Porteus, the Bishop of Chester and a well-known abolitionist (1731–1809); Lord Macclesfield and, possibly, Isaac Hawkins Browne.

=== Independent artist ===
In 1781, Boulton was ceasing the production of mechanical paintings, thus Barney's collaboration with Soho manufactory finished. In 1784, Barney still was in the Midlands, painting his second altar piece, The Apparition of Our Lord to St Thomas, for St Peter & St Paul's Roman Catholic church, and exhibiting at the Royal Academy from Summer Hill, Birmingham. Between 1786 and 1793, he lived in London, at 29, Tottenham Street, actively exhibiting figurative and historic paintings at the Royal Academy, although The London Book Trade names him as an engraver and print-seller. His Scene in the ‘Tempest, exhibited in 1788, might indicate his ambition to join the Boydell's Shakespeare Project in which his friends Benjamin West and Angelica Kauffman participated. During this time period, one of Barney's apprentices was William Armfield Hobday (1771–1831), who later was an eminent court painter.

In October 1793 he took the post of the Second Drawing Master for Figures at the Royal Military Academy, Woolwich, and moved to Greenwich. He remained at the Academy until 1820.

Joseph Barney. The Thatcher. 1802

The role of Drawing Master for Figures obviously influenced Barney's later subjects, increasingly sentimental, but still figurative, not "fruit and flowers". They also reveal his close collaboration with Francis Wheatley (1747–1801), Charles Turner (engraver) (1774–1857), William Hamilton (painter) (1751–1801), Thomas Gaugain (1756–1812). But, on the whole, his late works are of inferior quality in comparison with his early paintings. In 1796, a reviewer of the 1796 exhibition at the Royal Academy commented on Barney's Inside of a Stable: "We have seen a great many better things of this sort than this is - it wants effect and truth of colouring. - Apropos, where is Morland?"

Joseph Barney did not fulfil his artistic ambitions. His name is associated today with short-lived enterprise of mechanical paintings, a small number of "fruit and flowers" pieces, and cheap sentimental colour prints, if not practically forgotten. The present location of most of his large-scale historic and religious paintings is unknown. But their number and their titles which correspond to those by leading artists of that time indicate his sound presence in London artistic world of the late 18th-early 19th centuries. Barney's early altar pieces which survive in Wolverhampton, give a good idea about his strong artistic potential which was recognised and respected by his contemporaries.

Reporting Barney's death in April 1832, The Staffordshire Advertiser wrote: "On the 13th inst., at his house, Stanhope-Terrace, Regent's Park, London, Joseph Barney, Esq. [died], aged 77. He was an eminent painter, and for more than 30 years drawing master at the Royal Military Academy, Woolwich. The altar pieces at St John's Church and at the Catholic Chapel, in Wolverhampton, of which he was native, formed lasting monuments of his skill as an artist."

== Children ==
1. Jane Whiston, b.1780.

2. Joseph (1783-after 1851). Became an artist and started to exhibit in 1817 from his father's address in Greenwich; in 1818 moved to 17, Great Smith Street, Westminster, and finally to Southampton, from where he exhibited until 1842. He was a drawing teacher, exclusively a fruit and flower artist, and in the late 1830s became a Fruit and Flower Painter to Queen Victoria. It may well be that some artworks by Joseph Barney-son have been ascribed to his father.

3. William Whiston, b.1785. Received artistic training from S. W. Reynolds. Later abandoned his artistic career, joined the army, and distinguished himself in the Peninsular War.

4. George (1792–1862). Became a soldier and military engineer who also served in the Peninsular War and in the West Indies, and later took a significant place in the history of Australia.

5. Sophia, b.1793.

6. John Edward (1796–1855).

7. Ellen, b. 1799.
