= Surveyor General of New South Wales =

Government agency

The Surveyor General of New South Wales is the primary government authority responsible for land and mining surveying in New South Wales.

The original duties for the Surveyor General was to measure and determine land grants for settlers in New South Wales.

The Surveyor General is the leader and regulator of the land and mining surveying profession and plays a key advocacy role in the spatial industry in NSW

- Responsibilities under the Surveying & Spatial Information Act & its Regulation
- Surveyor General's Directions
- President of the Board of Surveying and Spatial Information (BOSSI)
- Chair of the Geographical Names Board (GNB)
- NSW representative on the Intergovernmental Committee for Surveying & Mapping (ICSM)
- Electoral Boundaries Commissioner (State & Federal)
- Sets the quality, education and competency standards for registered land and mining surveyors
- Responsible for protecting the public and the integrity of the state cadastre by suspension or removal of registered surveyors in relation to misconduct or incompetence
- Responsible for the DCS Spatial Services Survey Operations team (Geodesy, State control survey, CORSnet-NSW, SCIMS)

== List of Surveyors General of New South Wales ==
Surveyor General	Period in office	Comments	Notes
Augustus Alt	1787–1803	Alt's job was mainly undertaken by then Deputy, Charles Grimes	
Charles Grimes	1803–1811	George William Evans acted August 1803 – February 1805	
John Oxley	1812–1828		
Sir Thomas Mitchell	1828–1855	Samuel Augustus Perry, deputy from 1829. Mitchell was knighted in 1839 for his contribution to the surveying of Australia. In May 1836, Mitchell, after being followed for several days, armed his men against New South Wales Government orders and organised an unprovoked ambush of them. The massacre took place over the course of several days; There were at least seven killed as they fled across the Murray River. The subsequent public enquiry in Sydney resulted in only a minor reprimand of Mitchell for his actions. It was also recorded that Mitchell changed his recollections of the account. The site of the massacre was named Mount Dispersion by Mitchell. While he was acquitted by the enquiry, the incident tarnished his reputation for the rest of his career.	
George Barney	1855–1859		
Alexander McLean	1861–1862	Acting Surveyor General 1859–1861	
Walker Davidson	1864–1868	Acting Surveyor General 1861–1863	
Philip Adams	1868–1887	Assisted the NSW Government Astronomer in observing a transit of Venus	
Edward Twynam	1890–1901	Acting Surveyor General 1888–1890	
Position abolished	1890–1911	Office of Surveyor-General abolished in 1890, replaced by Chief Surveyor and Superintendent of Trigonometrical Survey.	
Joseph Allworth	1901–1904		
Edward MacFarlane	1904–1908		
Robert McDonald	1908–1911		
Frederick Poate	1911–1916	Surveyor-General title revived 1911	
John Broughton	1916–1922		
Alfred Chesterman	1922–1925		
Henry Hall	1925–1926		
Hamilton Mathews	1926–1937		
Arthur Allen	1937–1945		
Harold Barrie	1945–1946		
Daniel Mulley	1946–1953		
George Vincent	1953–1960		
Charles Elphinstone	1960–1963		
Henry Barr	1963–1965		
Leo Fletcher	1965–1978		
Jack Darby	1979–1985		
Don Grant AO RFD	1986–2000	Grant was appointed an Officer of the Order of Australia in the 2020 Australia Day Honours for "distinguished service to surveying, particularly through the establishment of a combined public sector mapping agency". He was previously appointed a Member of the Order of Australia in June 1994 in recognition of service to surveying. Grant has also been awarded three honorary doctorate degrees from Australian universities. In 1997, Charles Sturt University conferred on Grant the degree of Doctor of Applied Science (honoris causa) for his contribution to Australian and international surveying, mapping and spatial information. Also in 1997, the University of New South Wales awarded Grant the degree of Doctor of Science (honoris causa). In 2004, the University of Melbourne awarded Grant the degree of Doctor of Surveying (honoris causa) for his contributions to surveying.	
Warwick Watkins	2000–2011	Watkins was not professionally qualified as a surveyor or a Registered Surveyor. Watkins was sacked from the NSW Public Service after the NSW Independent Commission Against Corruption (ICAC) found in December 2011 that he acted corruptly after he had been stood down in March 2011 from his Chief Executive position in the NSW Public Service. The week prior to being sacked from the NSW Public Service, Watkins resigned his appointments as Surveyor-General, Registrar-General and Commissioner of the Soil Conservation Service. Had Watkins not resigned as Surveyor-General prior to being dismissed from the NSW Public Service, he would have become the first ever Surveyor-General sacked. Following ICAC's findings, Watkins faced criminal charges in the NSW Local Court where it was reported he could have received 10 years imprisonment. Two of the charges were dismissed by the Court and in December 2013, Watkins was placed on a 12-month good behaviour bond for the further two charges of misleading ICAC, to which he had pleaded guilty. On 23 October 2014, the Royal Institution of Chartered Surveyors expelled Watkins from the Institution and he automatically lost his Fellowship. The Commonwealth of Australia Gazette, 29 February 2016, issued notice that the Governor-General of Australia, Sir Peter Cosgrove, had terminated Watkins appointment as a Member of the Order of Australia. In November 2019, Watkins’ Honorary Fellowship of the Institution of Surveyors NSW was suspended for six months and he died on 12 November 2019.	
Desmond Mooney	2011–2016		
Narelle Underwood	2016–2025	Underwood was the youngest person in 200 years and the first female to be appointed to the position of Surveyor-General.	
Thomas Grinter	2025–present	Grinter is not listed by the Board of Surveying and Spatial Information as a Registered Surveyor, but holds a Masters of Engineering in GNSS positioning and a Master's degree in Law.	
