= Mount Dispersion, New South Wales =

Massacre in New South Wales Australia

Mount Dispersion
- Mount Dispersion Massacre Site Aboriginal Place
- Location within New South Wales

Highest point
- Coordinates: 34°34′18″S 142°28′29″E

Geography
- Location: South‑western New South Wales, Australia

Location in New South Wales

Mount Dispersion, in south-western New South Wales, is the location of the massacre of Aboriginal Australians by Major Thomas Mitchell on 27 May 1836. Officially recognised as an Aboriginal place under the National Parks and Wildlife Act 1974 in May 2020, the official name is the Mount Dispersion Massacre Site Aboriginal Place.

== History ==
In May 1836 Mitchell and his surveying party had been followed for several days by a group of Aboriginal people, starting from Lake Benanee, near the present-day town of Euston. Although it is not exactly clear what happened, it seems that instead of attempting negotiation, Mitchell and his men decided to launch a surprise attack on 27 May. In Mitchell's words:

it was difficult to come at such enemies hovering in our rear with lynx-eyed vigilance of savages. I succeeded however... Attacked simultaneously by both parties the whole betook themselves to the river, my men pursuing them and shooting as many as they could, Numbers were shot swimming across the Murray, and some ever after they had reached the opposite shore as they descended the bank.

There were at least seven Aboriginal people killed as they fled across the Murray River. Mitchell faced an enquiry in Sydney afterwards, so his account was recorded, but that of the survivors was not. Mitchell received only a minor reprimand for his actions.

Mitchell named the small hill Mount Dispersion.

Mitchell later published a book in which he justified the event by emphasising that the ambush was an act of self-defence: he portrayed the Aboriginal people as hostile tribes from the Darling River intent on revenge for an incident during his 1835 expedition in which his party shot and wounded a man, and killed another man and a woman who was carrying a baby.

== Recognition ==
A monument in the form of a cairn was built by the Mildura Historical Society in September 1963, with the inscription "Mt Dispersion / Named by Major Mitchell on May 26th 1836 after an encounter with Aboriginies[sic] at this spot"; however, it was placed 2 kilometres (1.2 mi) from the correct location.

The same site had been known as a sacred site for thousands of years by the Kureinji and Barkindji peoples, with a songline relating to "the story of the great warrior and the cod and the spiritual ancestors" connected to it. Mutti Mutti elder Barry Pearce, who lives nearby, believes that knowledge of history such as this, and acknowledgement of Australian frontier wars, helps reconciliation, and would also like visitors to know about the cultural history of the spot - that it is "more than the massacre". He was inspired to have the site acknowledged, and Heritage NSW officer Harvey Johnston led a project to have it formally recognised on the New South Wales State Heritage Register.

On 24 April 2020, Mount Dispersion was recorded in the New South Wales Government Gazette as an Aboriginal Place under the National Parks and Wildlife Act 1974 (NSW). It was officially listed on 27 May 2020, 184 years to the day that the massacre took place.

== Location ==
Mount Dispersion is close to the border with Victoria, on Tapalin Mail Road. It lies on a former course of the Murray, near Euston.
