= Kaldor Public Art Projects =

Australian arts organisation

- Named after: John Kaldor
- Formation: 1969; 57 years ago
- Founder: John Kaldor AO
- Legal status: Charity; Australian Government Register of Cultural Organisations
- Headquarters: Sydney, New South Wales
- Fields: Visual arts; public art installations
- Director: John Kaldor AO
- General Manager: Bettina Kaldor
- Board of directors: Liz Cacciottolo, Craig Holland, Bettina Kaldor, John Kaldor, Mark Nelson, Damian Roche, Michael Snelling
- Staff: 14 (2019)
- Website: kaldorartprojects.org.au

Kaldor Public Art Projects is an Australian non-profit arts organisation established in 1969 by John Kaldor AO. The organisation collaborates with international artists to create site-specific art projects in public spaces in Australia.

Kaldor's first project, in 1969, was Christo and Jeanne-Claude’s Wrapped Coast, which at the time was the largest single artwork ever made. By 2026 the organisation had brought 38 art projects to Australia, utilising a variety of public spaces including Cockatoo Island, Old Melbourne Gaol, and Sydney Park Brickworks. Kaldor Public Art Projects has worked with artists including Gilbert & George, Michael Landy, Jeff Koons, Bill Viola, Thomas Demand, John Baldessari, and Tino Sehgal, among others.

Kaldor Public Art Projects has been listed on the register of charitable organisations since 2004, and also contributes to the development of Australia's cultural life through education programs for primary, secondary, and tertiary institutions, and the general public.

== Project history ==
=== 1969 to 1979 ===
John Kaldor's first public work was a commission by artists Christo and Jeanne-Claude, who were invited to Sydney and Melbourne in 1969 and created Wrapped Coast at Little Bay, alongside Drawings and Collages, exhibited at Central Street Gallery; and Wool Works, at the National Gallery of Victoria.

A 1971 project curated by Harald Szeemann involved 23 Australian artists including Aleks Danko, Dale Hickey, Mike Parr, William Pidgeon and Brett Whiteley. The project was exhibited in Sydney at the Bonython Gallery, and in Melbourne at the National Gallery of Victoria.

Exhibitions in Sydney and Melbourne in 1973 of Gilbert & George included the live performance work The Singing Sculpture, and charcoal on paper works The Shrubberies Number 1 and The Shrubberies Number 2, in Sydney at the Art Gallery of New South Wales; and in Melbourne at the National Gallery of Victoria. Also in 1973 were exhibitions by Miralda: Coloured Feast at the John Kaldor Fabricmaker showrooms, Sydney; and Coloured Bread at the Art Gallery of New South Wales.

During 1976, artists Charlotte Moorman and Nam June Paik were featured as part of the Adelaide Festival at the Art Gallery of South Australia in Elder Park, Adelaide; and at the Art Gallery of New South Wales and the Sydney Opera House forecourt.

1977 saw Sol LeWitt's work exhibited in Sydney, All two part combinations of arcs from four corners, arcs from four corners, arcs from four sides, straight, not-straight & broken lines in four directions at the Art Gallery of New South Wales; in Melbourne the work Lines to points on a grid. On yellow: Lines from the center of the wall. On red: Lines from four sides. On blue: Lines from four corners. On black: Lines from four sides, four corners and the centre of the wall during March and April at the National Gallery of Victoria; in Broken Hill and of the sculptural works of Richard Long devised in Broken Hill entitled A straight hundred mile walk in Australia and A line in Australia during December; in Melbourne, entitled Bushwood Circle at the National Gallery of Victoria; and in Sydney, entitled Stone Line, at the Art Gallery of New South Wales.

=== 1981 to 2000 ===
A 1984 global exhibition called An Australian Accent featured Australian artists Mike Parr, Imants Tillers, and Ken Unsworth was exhibited in New York at the P.S.1 Contemporary Art Center; in Washington D.C. at the Corcoran Gallery of Art; in Perth at the Art Gallery of Western Australia; and in Sydney at the Art Gallery of New South Wales.

Christo and Jeanne-Claude returned to Australia in 1990, exhibiting in Sydney with Wrapped Vestibule and Christo at the Art Gallery of New South Wales and in Perth with Christo at the Art Gallery of Western Australia.

Jeff Koons was invited to Sydney to display his 1992 Puppy exhibition at the Museum of Contemporary Art Australia.

Sol LeWitt returned to Australia in 1998 with an exhibition entitled Wall Pieces at the Museum of Contemporary Art Australia.

In 1999 Vanessa Beecroft's VB40 was exhibited in early August, also at the Museum of Contemporary Art Australia.

=== 2001 to 2010 ===
Ugo Rondinone presented an exhibition entitled Our Magic Hour at the Museum of Contemporary Art Australia; and in Melbourne, Clockwork for Oracle at the Australian Centre for Contemporary Art. The same year Barry McGee was exhibited at the Metropolitan Meat Market, Melbourne with an exhibition entitled The stars were aligned… and at the National Gallery of Victoria with the Water Wall Mural.

In 2007, an Urs Fischer installation at Cockatoo Island in Sydney Harbour attracted significant international attention. Gregor Schneider exhibited 21 Beach Cells at Bondi Beach and, with the support of Kaldor Public Art Projects, at Accadia Beach in Herzlia, Israel from 13 to 20 June 2009.

A 2008 exhibition by Bill Viola and entitled Fire Woman and Tristan’s Ascension (The Sound of a Mountain Under a Waterfall) was held at St Saviour's Church, Redfern. The same year, Martin Boyce exhibited We Are Shipwrecked and Landlocked at the Old Melbourne Gaol.

A Tatzu Nishi exhibition entitled War and Peace and In Between was held on Art Gallery Road adjacent to the Art Gallery of New South Wales.

Stephen Vitiello was featured in 2010 with an exhibition entitled The Sound of Red Earth, held at the Sydney Park Brickworks at St Peters. The same year, Bill Viola returned with Fire Woman, Tristan’s Ascension (The Sound of a Mountain Under a Waterfall), in St Carthage's Church, Melbourne; and The Raft, held at the Australian Centre for the Moving Image. In Brisbane, the Gallery of Modern Art featured an exhibition by Santiago Sierra entitled 7 Forms Measuring 600 x 60 x 60 cm. Constructed to be held horizontally to a wall in 2010.

=== 2011 to present ===
In 2011, a John Baldessari exhibition entitled Your Name in Lights was displayed on the Australian Museum, William Street façade, Sydney as part of the Sydney Festival from 8 to 30 January. The same exhibition was displayed on the Stedelijk Museum, with Holland Festival, Amsterdam. A Michael Landy installation entitled Acts of Kindness was displayed in lower Martin Place, Sydney, and across 200 Sydney CBD sites.

A 2012 exhibition by Thomas Demand entitled The Dailies was held at the Commercial Travellers' Association, MLC Centre, Sydney. The same year Allora and Calzadilla had an exhibition entitled Stop, Repair, Prepare . . . at the Cowen Gallery, State Library of Victoria, Melbourne.

An exhibition curated by Hans Ulrich Obrist and Klaus Biesenbach entitled 13 Rooms was held in 2013 at Pier 2/3 Hickson Road, Walsh Bay, Sydney. The following year Roman Ondak was featured in an exhibition entitled Measuring the Universe, Swap, and Terrace at the Parramatta Town Hall, Sydney. A few weeks later Tino Sehgal exhibited This Is So Contemporary at the Art Gallery of New South Wales.

In 2014, to mark the 45th anniversary of Kaldor Public Art Projects, an open invitation was extended to Australian artists to share Your very good idea, which would be subject to review by a panel before a winner was chosen. Sydney-based Wiradjuri/Kamilaroi artist Jonathan Jones was selected and, in 2016, he exhibited a large-scale installation entitled barrangal dyara (skin and bones), an historical relational work that recalled the Garden Palace in the Royal Botanic Garden, Sydney.

In 2015, exhibitions were by Marina Abramović and Xavier Le Roy.

In 2019, Kaldor Public Art Projects celebrated its 50th anniversary with an exhibition at the Art Gallery of New South Wales, Making Art Public: 50 Years of Kaldor Public Art Projects, created by Michael Landy. Artists commissioned to create new works for the exhibition were Alicia Frankovich, Agatha Gothe-Snape, Ian Milliss, and Imants Tillers. In 2020, interviews with artists commissioned for past Kaldor exhibitions, conducted by Hans Ulrich Obrist, were printed in a publication titled Making Art Public, Kaldor Public Art Projects, 1969–2019.
