= Jonathan Jones (artist) =

Australian artist (born 1978)

Jonathan Jones (born 1978) is a Sydney-based Indigenous Australian artist who has made extensive contributions to the contemporary Aboriginal art scene in Australia. The Art Gallery of NSW and the National Gallery of Victoria have acquired works by Jones. Jones was a recipient of a Sidney Myer Creative Fellowship, an award of A$160,000 given to mid-career creatives and thought leaders.

== Early life ==
Jones was born in Sydney, New South Wales, in 1978, but spent parts of his early life in Bathurst and a small town near Tamworth. Jones is a member of the Wiradjuri and Kamilaroi peoples of south-east Australia, and his identity as an Indigenous artist has become central to his practice. Jones' grandmother encouraged him to explore his heritage, and this process of self-learning formed the foundations of his artistic career. His grandmother was a very influential figure in his life who taught him to be proud of his heritage. These sentiments have informed his purpose as a creator of public art installations, and can be seen through his poignant interventions into sites around Sydney, which he reveals have deeper histories than the colonial ones present in the national popular imagination.

== Practice ==
Jones is based in Sydney. He is a multi-disciplinary artist, working with a range of different materials and technologies to create installations, interventions, public artwork, prints, drawings, sculpture and film. While Jones works across a wide range of media, his intentions are consistently explicit. Jones is known for his use of everyday materials in minimal, repeated forms as a way to explore Indigenous traditions and perspectives. This motif of minimalist, linear forms represent both the traditional and the contemporary. Jones' fascination with this dichotomy has deeply informed his work, and has led him to pursue projects which reveal connections between a site's historical and current usage. In order to realise these projects, Jones’ work is often grounded in research and collaboration with other artists and remote communities to develop art that acknowledges local knowledge systems and specific concerns.

Jones has previously worked in the communities of Boggabilla in Northern NSW and Amata in the Anangu Pitjantjatjara Yankunytjatjara (APY lands) of north-western South Australia. These collaborations led to an interrogation of more themes throughout his work, namely, the relationship between the community and the individual, as well as private and public.

=== Site-specific works ===
Jones' work represents, embodies or engages with a site. Works that are site-specific suit Jones' practice as he is able to alter public space, creating interventions into Western narratives of the land, and challenging cultural discourse at large. Jones reveals the hidden histories of a city through his art.

Barrangal Dyara (Skin and Bones) is a prime example of the way Jones has used public art installation projects to expose an element of Australian history which has been suppressed by cultural amnesia. Skin and Bones is a representation of the 19th Century Garden Palace building in the Royal Botanic Gardens in Sydney that burned down, destroying many Indigenous artefacts collected along the colonial frontier. Masses of white, sculptural shields cover the space where the building would have stood, creating a large scale, decorative memorial. The motif of the shield acts as a visual metaphor for the cultural loss that occurred, and also demonstrates that Jones, through his art, interprets the site's history through an Aboriginal lens. This work was Kaldor Public Art Project's 32nd project.

=== Light works ===
As well as working on ephemeral, site-specific, public art installations, Jones has also worked extensively with the medium of light. He works with fluorescent light tubes to further explore the connections between individuals, communities and land, as well as "illuminating a bridge between cultures and the space of exchange". Jones often employs light to further accentuate surface textures and strong geometric lines. To the viewer, these works can appear as tasteful Western interpretations of minimalist compositions, however, for Jones the cross-hatching and chevron motifs are also direct references to Aboriginal concerns of country and community. These themes, as well as his repeated use of line, allude to the Aboriginal line designs specific to south-eastern Australia, which have been continuously appropriated in the Western canon. Jones states, "In this region the line is used to create patterns and designs, often carved into wood, skin and the ground."

Jones' work Blue Poles, 2004/2010, addresses the role of appropriation within Western art movements - directly through Jackson Pollock's iconic 'Blue Poles' - and clearly demonstrates his keen adoption of light mediums. Jones' use of light in this work underlines the paradox of the traditional and contemporary in a poignant way. The minimalist, structured light tubes appear contemporary, while the motif of the lines speaks to his Aboriginal heritage: connections with the land that date back thousands of years.

== Exhibitions and collections ==
Jones' work has been exhibited in many major Australian and international art museums, galleries, festivals and biennales. The National Gallery of Australia, the Art Gallery of NSW and the National Gallery of Victoria have all acquired works by Jones.

=== Tarnanthi 2019 ===
An exhibition of colonial artworks alongside the tools and objects of Aboriginal people, accompanied by carefully researched text and commentary by Jones, writer and researcher Bruce Pascoe and historian Bill Gammage, was the subject of an exhibition entitled Bunha-bunhanga: Aboriginal agriculture in the south-east, mounted in the Art Gallery of South Australia's Elder Wing and the Museum of Economic Botany, as part of Tarnanthi 2019. Jones created a series of outsize grindstones within the Museum building.

== Publications ==
Jones has written, co-written, or contributed to many works about art. These include:

- Tradition today : Indigenous art in Australia, an Art Gallery of NSW publication which he co-authored with Ken Watson and Hetti Perkins
