= Mel O'Callaghan =

Australian-born artist (born 1975)

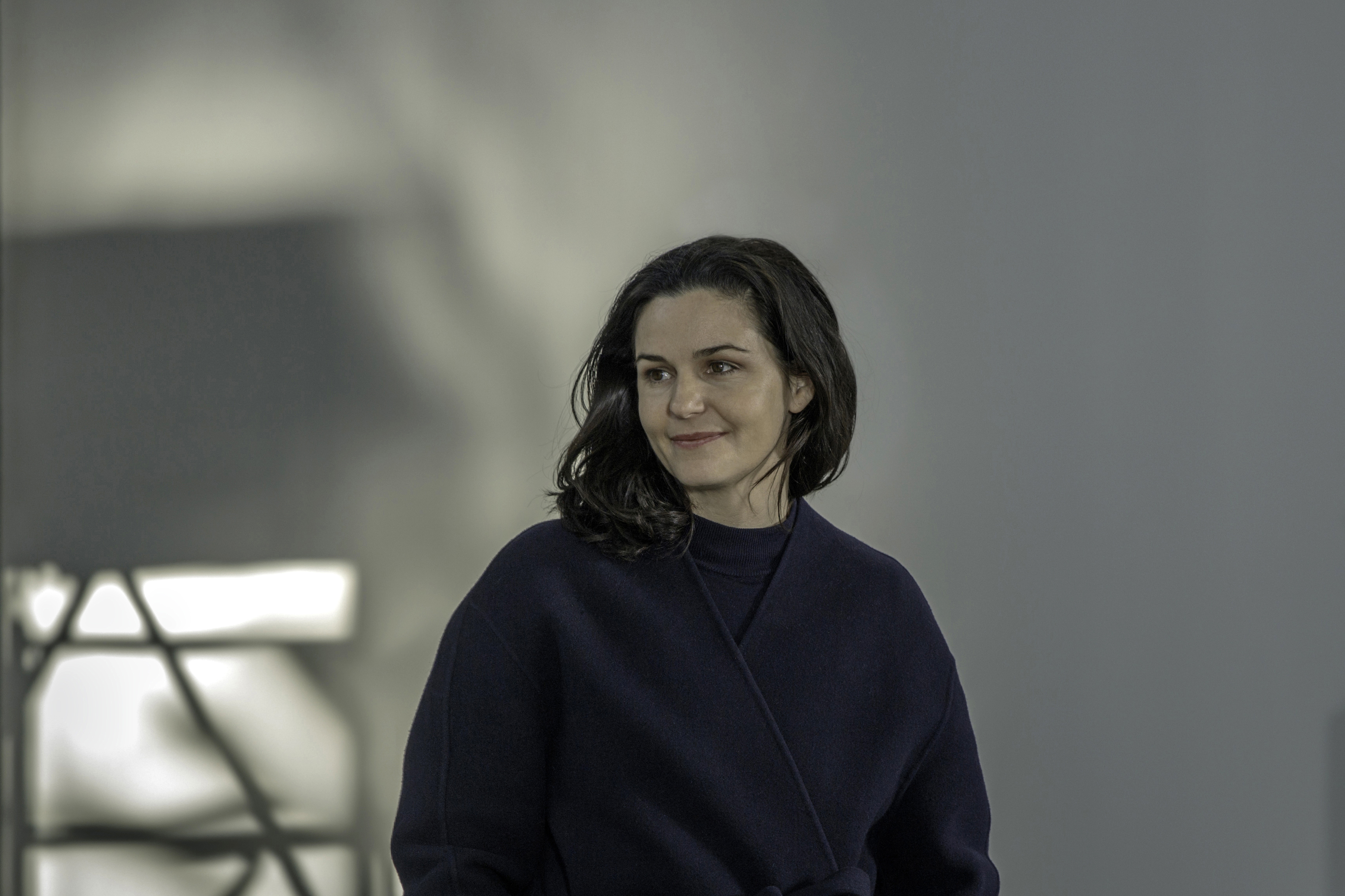
- Born: 1975 (age 50–51); Sydney, Australia
- Education: University of Sydney; University of New South Wales
- Known for: video; sculpture; installation; painting

Mel O'Callaghan (born 1975) is an Australian contemporary artist who lives and works in Paris, France, and Sydney, Australia.

== Early life and education ==
Mel O'Callaghan was born in Sydney, Australia in 1975.

She attained a Bachelor of Visual Arts with Honours from the Sydney College of Arts, University of Sydney, and a Masters of Fine Arts in Research from the College of Fine Arts (COFA), University of New South Wales, and a Bachelor of Science Architecture from the University of Sydney.

== Work ==
O'Callaghan's work includes video, performance, sculpture, installation, and painting.

== Exhibitions ==
O'Callaghan has been in solo and group exhibitions around the world and received a number of awards for her artistic practice.

=== Centre of the Centre ===
Centre of the Centre was O'Callaghan's first large-scale exhibition in an Australian public institution. Combining a large-scale video, sculptural installations, and regular performances, the show explored the origins of life and regeneration

The video was a result of multiple cross-disciplinary collaborations, including one with Daniel Fornari from the Woods Hole Oceanographic Institution in Massachusetts. It is 20 minutes long, was projected 7 metres wide, and includes underwater shots of thermal vents in the Pacific Ocean as well as the coco worm. The performances involved breath-induced trances and took place around the exhibition's glass and metal sculptures.

Centre of the Centre was commissioned by Le Confort Moderne, Poitiers; Artspace, Sydney; and UQ Art Museum, Brisbane. It premiered at the former in June 2019 and will be on show at the latter until January 2021, after which it will tour various other Australian venues.

=== Major solo exhibitions ===
O'Callaghan has had major solo exhibitions in many parts of the world, including Australia, France, Portugal, Philippines, Spain, Canada and the United States.

- 2024: Live Echo, Cassandra Bird, Sydney, Australia
- 2023: Pulse of the Planet, Esker Foundation, Calgary, Canada
- 2022: All is Life, Carriageworks, Sydney, Australia
- 2022: Slime of Time, Galerie Allen, Paris, France
- 2022: Samstag Museum, Adelaide, Australia
- 2021–2023: Centre of the Centre, Tour with Museums and Galleries NSW, Australia to Samstag Museum, Adelaide; Hyphen, Wadonga; Wagga Wagga Art Gallery - National Art Glass Gallery; Western Plains Cultural Centre, Dubbo; Goulburn Regional Gallery; Glasshouse Regional Gallery, Port Macquarie
- 2021: Primary / Secondary Score, Nuit Blanche, Paris, France
- 2020: Centre of the Centre, UQ Art Museum, University of Queensland, Brisbane, Australia and Museum of Contemporary Art and Design (MCAD), Manila, Philippines
- 2019: Centre of the Centre, Artspace, Sydney, Australia and Le Confort Moderne, Poitiers, France
- 2018: Primary/Secondary Score, Barangaroo and Carriageworks, Sydney, Australia
- 2017: Ensemble (video installation), National Gallery of Victoria (NGV) Melbourne, Australia (previously shown at the Centre Pompidou, Paris; in Málaga, and the Institut d'Art Contemporain Villeurbanne/ Rhône-Alpes in Lyon, France in 2016
- 2017: Dangerous on-the-way, Palais de Tokyo, Paris, France
- 2014: Ensemble, Osmos, New York, US
- 2014: L'acte Gratuit, Galerie Allen, Paris, France
- 2012: Move, Casa-Museu Medeiros e Almeida, Lisbon, Portugal
- 2012: Endgame, Galeria Belo-Galsterer, Lisbon, Portugal
- 2010: Each atom of that stone, Grantpirrie Offsite, Sydney, Australia
- 2007: Landslide, Galerie Schleicher Lange, Paris, France
- 2005: The Fall, M. David-Weill Galleries, Cité Internationale des Arts, Paris, France
- 2005: Somewhere, Galerie Schleicher Lange, Paris and Sherman Galleries, Sydney
- 2004: The Fall, Salles E.M. Sandoz M. David Weill, Cité internationale des arts, Paris, France
- 2003: In the Half Light, 4A Centre for Contemporary Asian Art, Sydney, Australia
- 2002: The Fly and the Mountain, Art Gallery of New South Wales (AGNSW), Sydney, Australia (with Nell)
- 2001: Vagari, Centre for Contemporary Art, Prague

=== Major group exhibitions ===
O'Callaghan has been involved in group exhibitions in Australia, Brazil, France, Germany, Italy, the Netherlands, New Zealand, Norway, Portugal, Saudi Arabia, Singapore, South Korea, Spain, Taiwan, the United Kingdom and the United States.

- 2025: Direct Bodily Empathy, Govett-Brewster Art Gallery, Len Lye Centre, Aotearoa New Zealand
- 2024: The Charge That Binds, Australian Centre for Contemporary Art (ACCA), Melbourne
- 2024: Undo The Day, NAS National Art School Galleries, Sydney
- 2024: Peace More Real, Galerie Allen, Paris
- 2023: Seeing the Invisible, Museum of Contemporary Art (MOCA), Toronto
- 2023: Zone de contact, Poush, Centre for Contemporary Creation, Paris
- 2023: Un lac inconnu, Bally Foundation, Lugano
- 2023: The Brightside of the Desert Moon, Noor Riyadh, Saudi Arabia
- 2022: Seeing the Invisible, Outset Contemporary Art Fund, Jerusalem
- 2021: (Un)learning Australia, Seoul Museum of Art (SEMA), Seoul
- 2019: Primary/ Secondary Score, Yo-Chang Art Museum, National Taiwan University of Arts
- 2018: 200 Videos, Museo D'Art Contemporanea di Roma, Italy
- 2018: International Film Festival Rotterdam, Netherlands
- 2017: Lock/Route, Gillman Barracks, Singapore
- 2016: L'art de la re'volte (The Art of Revolt), Hors-Pistes, Centre Pompidou, Málaga, Spain
- 2015: Nature/Revelation, The Ian Potter Museum, National Gallery of Victoria (NGV), Melbourne, Australia
- 2014: 19th Biennale of Sydney, You Imagine What You Desire, Sydney, Australia
- 2010: Dying in Spite of the Miraculous, Gurtrude Contemporary art Space and Melbourne International Arts Festival, Melbourne, Australia
- 2010: La Main Numerique, National Taiwan Museum of Fine Arts, Taipei, Taiwan
- 2006: Videoformes, Prix de la Creation Video, Clermont Ferrand, France
- 2005: National Sculpture Prize, National Gallery of Australia (NGA), Canberra, Australia
- 2005 Videobrasil 05 15º, Internacional Video Art Biennale, São Paulo, Brazil
- 2003: Printroom, Gertrude Centre for Contemporary Art, Melbourne, Australia
- 2001: Helen Lempriere Travelling Art Award, Artspace, Sydney, Australia

== Major grants, awards, residencies ==
- 2024: Laureate, Prix Carta Bianca, France and Italy
- 2020: Finalist, The Fauvette Loureiro Memorial Scholarship, University of Sydney
- 2019: Residency, Fondation National des Arts Graphiques et Plastiques (FNAGP)
- 2018: Residency, Woods Hole Oceanographic Institution; US National Science Foundation & US Navy
- 2017: Finalist, Prix Meurice pour l'art contemporain, France
- 2017: Finalist, ACMI / Ian Potter Moving Image Commission
- 2017: Fondation National des Arts Graphiques et Plastiques (FNAGP), Artist Studio, Nogent-sur-Marne, France
- 2017: Cité internationale des arts, Artist Residency, Paris, France
- 2016: Cité internationale des arts, Artist Residency, Paris, France
- 2015: Recipient, Prix SAM pour l'Art Contemporain, France
- 2014: Nominated finalist, Bernd Lohaus Prize, Belgium
- 2014: Finalist, Kaldor Public Arts Projects, Sydney, Australia
- 2005: National Sculpture Prize, Finalist, National Gallery of Australia (NGA), Australia
- 2004–2022: Awarded Project and Research Grants, Australia Council for the Arts/ Creative Australia
- 2004–2018: Cité International des Arts, Artist Residency, Paris, France
- 2004: Grant, Australian Film Commission, Australia
- 2001: Residency, Centre for Contemporary Art, Prague, Czech Republic
- 2001: Finalist, Helen Lempriere Travelling Art Award

== Collections ==
O'Callaghan's work is held in a various collections in Australia and France.

- Ensemble (2013) at the National Gallery of Victoria, Melbourne, Australia
- The Art Gallery of South Australia
- Framework (2014) at FRAC Bretagne, Rennes, France
- Woods hole Oceanographic Institution, US
- UQ Art Museum
- Monash University Museum of Modern Art (MUMA), Australia
- Artbank, Australian Government Art Collection, Australia
- Attorney General's Department, Australian Government
- Musee National d'Art Moderne/Centre Pompidou, Paris, France
