= Cockatoo Island festival =

Music festival in Australia

Cockatoo Island Festival
- Genre: Rock, Hip hop, Electronic
- Dates: Easter
- Locations: (Australia) Cockatoo Island, Sydney Harbour
- Years active: 2005
- Website: Official Website

Cockatoo Island Festival was a music festival held on Cockatoo Island in Sydney Harbour, over Easter of 2005, organised by Brandon Saul and Julie Howie of Mixed Industry and The Sydney Harbour Federation Trust. The 2005 Cockatoo Island Festival attracted over 20,000 people across the 3 days, with some choosing to camp on the island, others buying a 3-day pass and catching a dedicated ferry service each day and some buying a single day pass. While some of the island was off limits, many of the old buildings were used as stages, with the Turbine hall used as the main stage for the festival, a natural amphitheatre looking towards the Gladesville Bridge and a spectacular sunset and an old tunnel to host DJs. In addition to musical acts, there was also on offer a range of other features such as comedy acts, bingo and trivia, conspiracy theory talks and yoga.

== Progress ==
In the intervening years since the Cockatoo Island Festival, the island has grown into a versatile venue on Sydney's cultural calendar. It hosted the contemporary art exhibition the Biennale of Sydney in 2008 and 2010, attracting over 80,000 and 157,000 visitors respectively. The Biennale returns to Cockatoo Island in 2012. The island hosted Sydney Festival's All Tomorrow's Parties music festival in January 2009. The 2-day festival included 24 bands over 4 stages across the island, and was curated and headlined by Nick Cave, attracting an audience of over 11,000. The island also hosted the World's Funniest Island Comedy Festival in October 2009, with 200 comedy acts appearing over a weekend and attracting over 8000 visitors. There are plans to repeat the comedy festival in 2010, and discussions are also continuing with Sydney Festival and other cultural bodies for future events.

The island is also increasingly used as a venue for private events large and small, and part of the blockbuster X-Men Origins: Wolverine was filmed there in 2008, with its star Hugh Jackman abseiling down the island's cliff into the crowd during the film's world first media launch on the island in April 2009.

A campsite opened on the island in 2008, campers can bring their own tents or take a camping package which includes pre-erected tent. The island's views of the Harbour Bridge and harbour make it a popular spot for watching the New Year's Eve fireworks, with the second NYE camping event for 2000 campers held in 2010. Three heritage dockyard residences are now also available as holiday houses.

The island is now much more accessible since Sydney Ferries increased their services to Cockatoo Island, and it is now a stop on the Woolwich/Balmain ferry route as well as the Parramatta Rivercat route. Day visitors are also welcome, and can picnic, barbecue, wander at leisure or take an audio or guided tour. Cockatoo Island is open daily and there is no admission charge.

== Artist lineup ==
The Turbine Hall	Village Green	The Jailyard	Factory Floor	Electroplate Pavilion
Friday: Hilltop Hoods; The Wailers; The Waifs; The Beautiful Girls; Saturday: Decoder Ring; Gomez; Machine Gun Fellatio; Sunday: Cubanismo!; Pete Murray; Eskimo Joe	Friday: Peter Fenton; Abby Dobson; Jeff Lang; Deborah Conway; David Lane; Carla Werner; Stiff Gins; Saturday: Darren Hanlon; Inga Liljestrom; Mick Hart; Andrew Morris; Kim Barlow; David Lane; Matt Ellis; Sunday: Circle Of Rhythm; Tim Rogers and the Temperance Union; Hirst & Greene; The Millers Tale; Dead Marines; Kim Barlow; Renny Field	Friday: Monkey Boy; Entropic; Michael Jerome Brown; New Buffalo; Waiting For Guinness; The Millers Tale; Custom Kings; Saturday: Monsieur Camembert; Kingtide; Fourplay; Lo-Tec Highbrows; The Hands; Stiff Gins; Waiting For Guinness; Sunday: The Louisville Sluggers; Aleeoop; Aronos; Ash Grunwald; Doch; Exotica; The Sins	Friday: Paul Dempsey; Augie March; Art of Fighting; Theredsunband; Pilate; Saturday: Youth Group; Machine Translations; Andy Clockwise; Offcuts; Dappled Cities Fly; Sunday: Little Birdy; The Mess Hall; 78 Saab; The Devoted Few	Friday: Koolism; MC Layla feat. Drapht; TZU; The Herd; Muph & Plutonic; Hermitude; Scott Burns & A Love; DJ Jack Priest; Saturday: The Bird; Loonaloop; Sola Rosa; Trakky Dax; Entropic; Radio Alchemy; Sunday: Sub Bass Snarl; Pivot; Mako; Dave Miller; Biosphere; Ollo; Sir Robbo & Prince V; Purdy; Gemma & Seymour Butz; Bec Paton
