= Wrapped Coast =

Environmental artwork

Wrapped Coast was a 1969 environmental artwork in which Christo and Jeanne-Claude wrapped a portion of Sydney's Little Bay in plastic fabric. It was funded by John Kaldor AO through Kaldor Public Art Projects.

== General references ==
- Baal-Teshuva, Jacob (2001). Christo and Jeanne-Claude. Taschen. ISBN 978-3-8228-5996-4.
- Blake, Elissa (June 1, 2020). "Christo's Wrapped Coast: how the monumental Australian work was made – and changed art history". The Guardian. ISSN 0261-3077.
- Chernow, Burt (2002). Christo and Jeanne-Claude: A Biography. Macmillan. ISBN 978-0-312-28074-1.
- Green, Charles (2001). "Negotiated Identity: Christo and Jeanne-Claude". The Third Hand. Collaboration in Art from Conceptualism to Postmodernism. University of Minnesota Press. pp. 125–137. ISBN 978-0-8166-3712-6. JSTOR 10.5749/j.ctttsbj7.10.
- Magnusson, Tony (October–November 2019). "One million square feet". Look Magazine (Art Gallery Society of New South Wales): 35.
- Westwood, Matthew (September 2, 2019). "Dreams of Landscape Reimagined". The Australian.
