= Io9 =

Blog

io9
- Website type: Blog
- Owner: Keleops Media
- Website: gizmodo.com/io9
- Launched: January 2, 2008; 18 years ago
- Current status: Active

io9 is a sub-blog of the technology blog Gizmodo that focuses on science fiction and fantasy pop culture, with former focuses on science, technology and futurism. It was created as a standalone blog in 2008 by editor Annalee Newitz under Gawker Media. In 2015, io9 became a part of Gizmodo as part of a reorganization under parent company Gawker.

== History ==
=== Independent site (2008–2015) ===
The blog was created in 2008 by Annalee Newitz under Gawker Media. Newitz had been approached by Gawker shortly after another of Newitz's projects, other magazine, ceased print publication—and was asked to start a science and science-fiction blog. Staff at founding included Charlie Jane Anders, Geoff Manaugh (BLDGBLOG), Graeme McMillan (Newsarama), Kevin Kelly (Joystiq, Cinematical) and feminist retro-futuristic writer Lynn Peril (author of Pink Think: Becoming a Woman in Many Uneasy Lessons). Newitz described the ethos of the site as about looking into the future and science fiction.

In February 2010, it was named one of the top 30 science blogs by Michael Moran of The Times' Eureka Zone blog, who wrote, "Ostensibly a blog for science fiction enthusiasts, io9 finds space for pieces on cutting-edge technology, the wilder fringes of astronomy and the more worrying implications of grey goo."

After seven years as head editor, in January 2014, Newitz became the new editor at Gizmodo, while co-founder Anders remained as editor at io9—as part of a plan by Gawker to integrate io9 with Gizmodo. io9's 11-member staff joined Gizmodo's 22 person staff, under Newitz's overall supervision. One of the reasons for the merger was to better coordinate content: io9 is a science and science fiction blog, while Gizmodo is a technology blog, which resulted in what Gawker assessed as roughly a 12% rate of overlapping content.

After a nearly eight-year run, Newitz retired from both io9 and Gizmodo on November 30, 2015, explaining that they had grown to disliking managing both sites at once and having taken them away from their passion of writing articles. Newitz moved to take a position as tech culture editor at Ars Technica. Anders remained as head editor of io9. Besides Newitz, several other longtime core staff members left their positions at io9 during this transitional period.

=== Sub-blog of Gizmodo (2015–present) ===
On 26 April 2016, Charlie Jane Anders left the site to focus her attention on her then untitled second novel and Rob Bricken took over as editor.

On July 31, 2018, Rob Bricken stepped down as editor of io9, saying that managing the site was taking up too much time and he would rather spend writing articles for it. His place as editor was filled by Jill Pantozzi, former editor-in-chief of The Mary Sue, who had originally joined io9 as a managing editor and took up the deputy editor position after Bricken's departure.

Following the departure of Pantozzi, who left the site entirely in December 2021, James Whitbrook, who had been an io9 staff writer since 2014, was made the new Deputy Editor in charge of io9.

In 2023 io9 was amongst sites owned by G/O Media that published AI written articles to significant backlash. There was internal dissent to this decision, with James Whitbrook publishing a statement denouncing the decision to publish such material.

== List of editors ==
Editor	Tenure	Ref.
Annalee Newitz	2008–2015	
Charlie Jane Anders	2015–2016	
Rob Bricken	2016–2018	
Jill Pantozzi	2018–2021	
James Whitbrook	2021–2026	
