= Cockatoo Island =

Heritage listed island in Sydney Harbour

- Location within New South Wales
- Location: New South Wales, Sydney
- Nearest city: Woolwich
- Coordinates: 33°50′51″S 151°10′21″E
- Area: 0.179 km^{2} (0.069 sq mi)
- Governing body: Sydney Harbour Federation Trust
- Website: https://www.cockatooisland.gov.au/en/

Cockatoo Island
UNESCO World Heritage Site
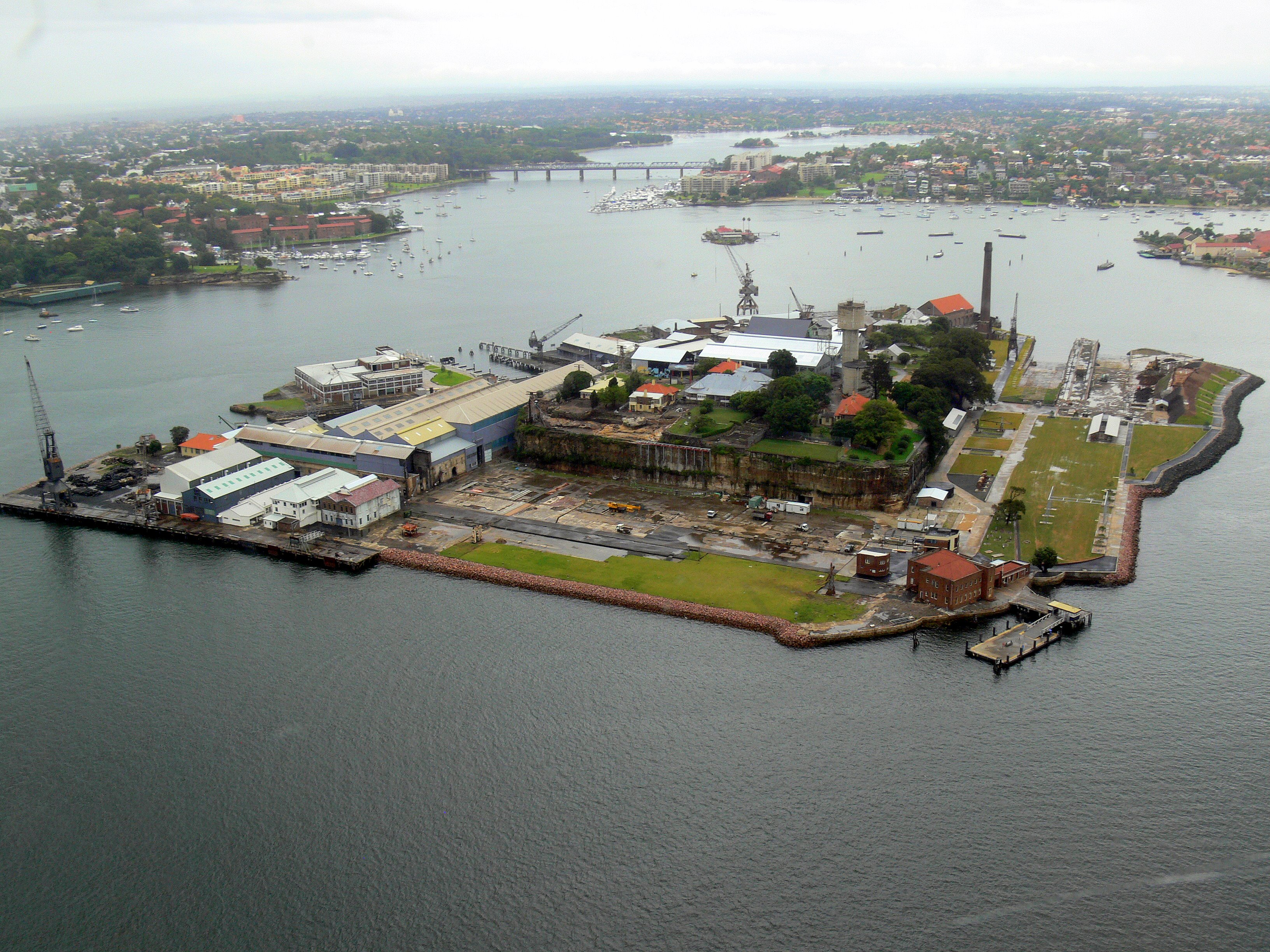
- Interactive map of Cockatoo Island
- Part of: Australian Convict Sites
- Criteria: Cultural: iv, vi
- Reference: 1306-010
- Inscription: 2010 (34th Session)

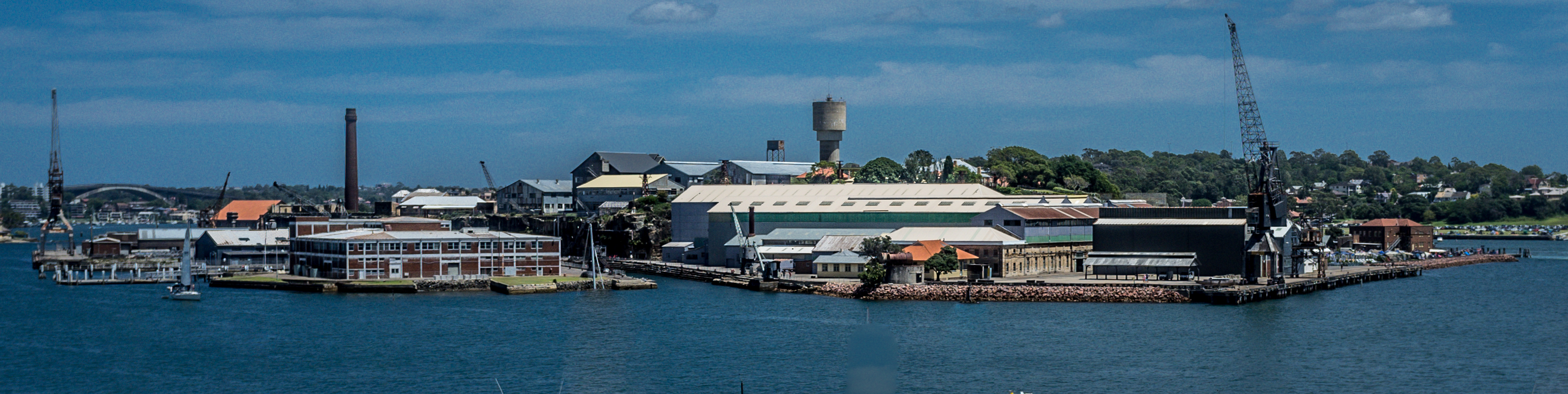
former Cockatoo Island Dockyard, view from Birchgrove

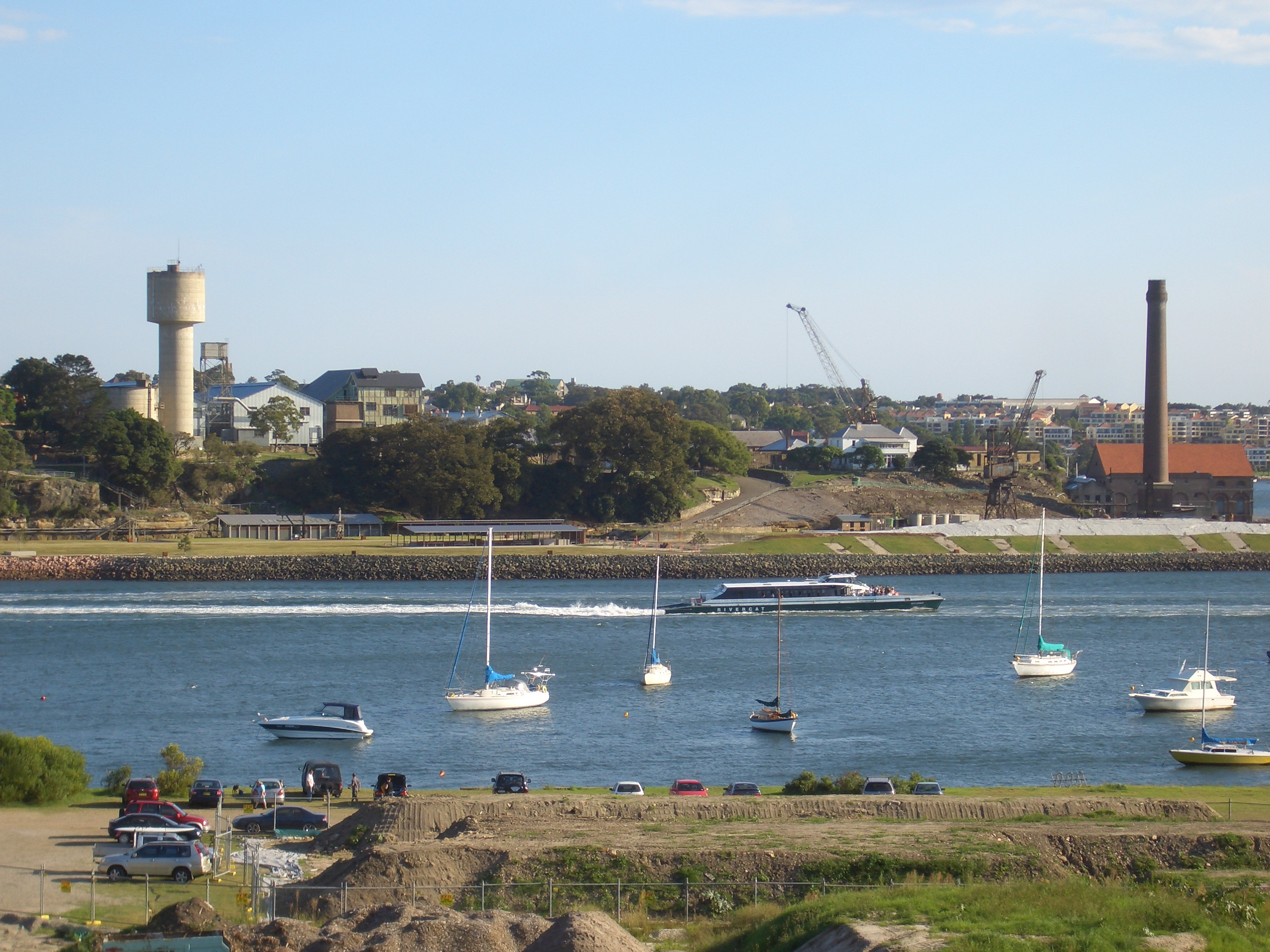
Cockatoo Island, view from Woolwich

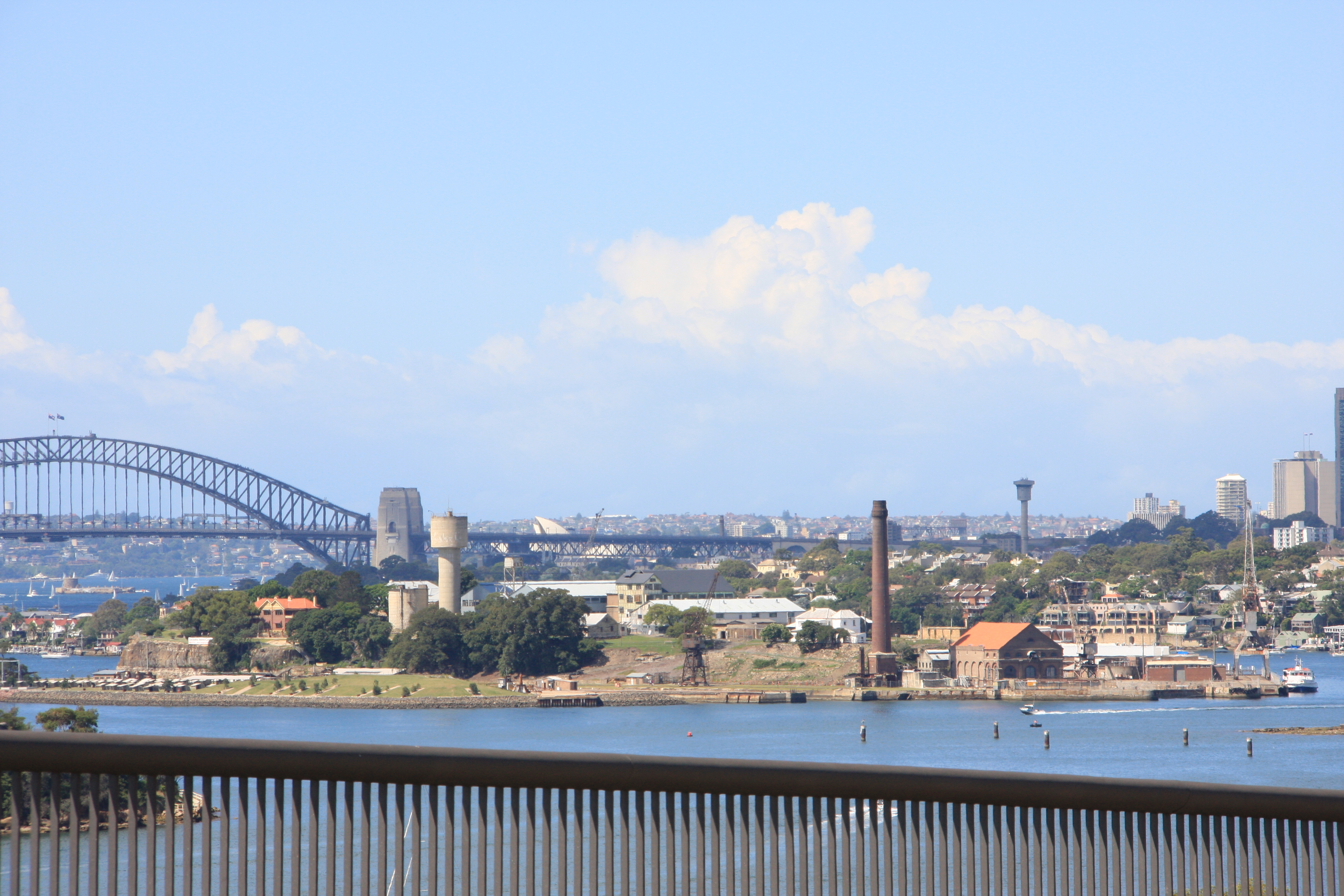
Cockatoo Island from the Gladesville Bridge

Cockatoo Island Wareamah is a UNESCO World Heritage Site at the confluence of the Parramatta River and Lane Cove River in Sydney Harbour, New South Wales, Australia.

Cockatoo Island is the largest of several harbour islands that were once heavily timbered sandstone knolls. Originally the Island rose to 18 m (59 ft) above sea level and was 12.9 hectares (32 acres) but it has been extended to 17.9 ha (44 acres) and is now cleared of most vegetation. Called Wa-rea-mah by the Indigenous Australians who traditionally inhabited the land prior to European settlement, the island may have been used as a fishing base, although physical evidence of Aboriginal heritage has not been found on the island.

Between 1839 and 1869, Cockatoo Island operated as a convict penal establishment, primarily as a place of secondary punishment for convicts who had re-offended in the colonies.

Cockatoo Island was also the site of one of Australia's biggest shipyards, operating between 1857 and 1991. The first of its two dry docks was built by convicts. Listed on the National Heritage List, the island is significant for its demonstration of the characteristics of a long-running dockyard and shipbuilding complex, including evidence of key functions, structures and operational layout. Cockatoo Island contains the nation's most extensive and varied record of shipbuilding, and has the potential to enhance understanding of maritime and heavy industrial processes in Australia from the mid-19th century.

In July 2010, UNESCO proclaimed Cockatoo Island as a World Heritage Site.

== Recent use and activities ==
The island has been managed since 2001 by the Sydney Harbour Federation Trust, which is also responsible for seven other lands around Sydney Harbour. The Harbour Trust is revitalising the island as a landmark harbour attraction with cultural events and heritage interpretation. Today Cockatoo Island retains some remnants of its past. Its prison buildings have been World Heritage listed, part of a serial listing of 11 Australian Convict Sites.

Although some large workshops, slipways, wharves, residences and other buildings remain, major buildings were demolished after Cockatoo Island closed as a dockyard in 1991. As the remaining buildings contain few of their original industrial artefacts and none of the remaining industrial heritage including the docks, caissons and cranes is operational, it is difficult to currently see how the island functioned as a dockyard for over a century.

In late March 2005 the Harbour Trust, in partnership with an event organiser, held the Cockatoo Island Festival. The event put the island on Sydney's cultural map and initiated a range of cultural activities including contemporary art installations, exhibitions and festivals.

The Harbour Trust opened a camp and glampsite on the island in 2008. The camp ground attracts some 20,000 campers a year and is a popular spot for watching Sydney's renowned New Year's Eve fireworks. In 2010, the island attracted a capacity crowd of over 2000 campers to view NYE fireworks. Other island holiday accommodation consists of five renovated houses and apartments with harbour and city views.

Sydney Ferries services Cockatoo Island as part of its Woolwich/Balmain ferry route and Parramatta RiverCat route. Day visitors are welcome, and can picnic, barbecue, visit the cafe, wander at leisure or take an audio or guided tour. Cockatoo Island is open daily and there is no admission charge.

Regular events and art installations are a feature of the island.

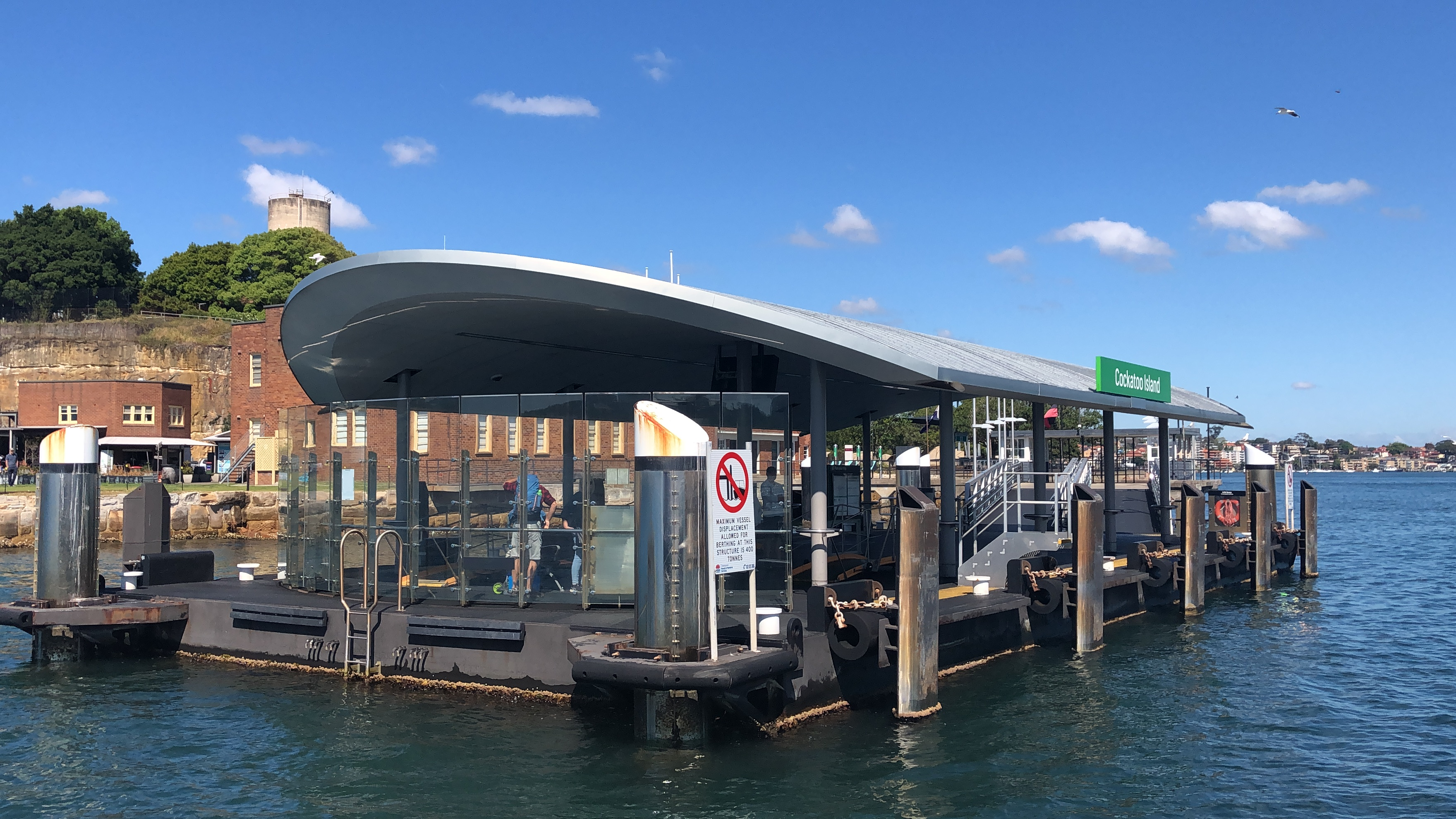
Cockatoo Island ferry wharf

Cockatoo Island has grown into a versatile cultural venue on Sydney's cultural calendar. In 2008, it was a major venue partner of the 16th Biennale of Sydney, attracting over 80,000 visitors over 12 weeks. In 2010, the event attracted over 156,000 people. In 2009, Cockatoo Island hosted the Sydney Festival's "All Tomorrow's Parties" music festival. The two-day festival included twenty-four bands over four stages across the island, and was curated and headlined by Nick Cave, attracting an audience of over 11,000. The island hosted the World's Funniest Island Comedy Festival in October 2009, with 200 comedy acts appearing over a weekend, attracting over 8,000 visitors.

The island is also increasingly used as a venue for private events both large and small. Part of films Unbroken and the blockbuster X-Men Origins: Wolverine were filmed there in 2008. Reality television programs have also used the island as a location.

Cockatoo Island was the site of a temporary public artwork which resembled the shadow of Captain Cook's commemorative statue in Sydney. This piece named 'Shadow on the Land, an excavation' by Nicholas Galanin excavated an outline of the statue on a grass patch, created for the 2020 Biennale of Sydney (22nd edition).

== Early history ==
Before the arrival of Europeans, Cockatoo Island was used by the indigenous Australian people of Sydney's coastal region. In 1839 it was chosen as the site of a new penal establishment by the Governor of the colony of New South Wales, Sir George Gipps. Between 1839 and 1869 the island was used as a convict prison. Initially, prisoners were transferred to Cockatoo Island from Norfolk Island, and were employed constructing their barracks and rock-cut silos for storing the colony's grain supply. By 1842, approximately 140 tonnes (140 long tons; 150 short tons) of grain were stored on the island.

Later, quarrying on the island provided stone for construction projects around Sydney, including the seawall for Circular Quay. Between 1847 and 1857, convicts were used to dig the Fitzroy Dock, Australia's first dry dock, on the island. An estimated 1.5 million cubic feet (42,000 m^{3}) of rock was excavated with 480,000 cu ft (14,000 m^{3}) forming the dock itself.

In 2009, an archeological dig on the island uncovered convict era punishment cells under the cookhouse. These cells give a valuable insight into the conditions convicts lived under on the island.

One prisoner on Cockatoo Island was the Australian bushranger, Captain Thunderbolt, who escaped in 1863 to begin the crime spree which made him famous. It is alleged that his wife swam across to the island with tools to effect his escape, following which they both swam back to the mainland. There is no significant evidence to support this claim. Thunderbolt's escape was dramatised in the film Captain Thunderbolt (1953).

From 1871 to 1913 facilities on the island often referred to the name Biloela instead of Cockatoo Island to avoid the stigma of the island's convict past.

=== Fitzroy Graving Dock ===
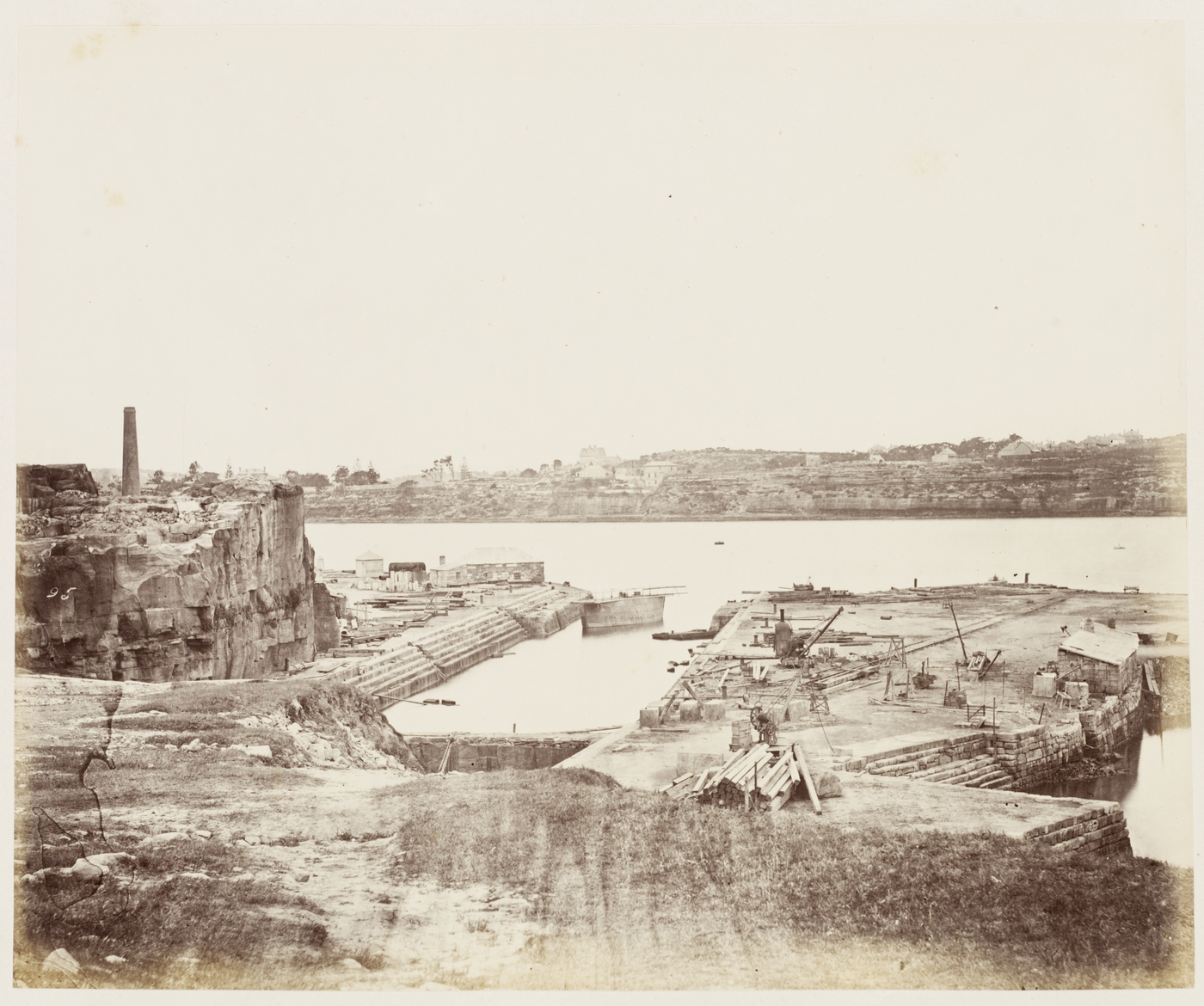
Cockatoo Island dry dock in 1872

The dock was designed by Gother Kerr Mann, the island's Civil Engineer, and built between 1847 and 1857 utilising convict labour. The foundation stone of its ashlar lining was laid on 5 June 1854 by Governor Charles Augustus FitzRoy, with the dock being named in his honour. When completed in 1857, the dry dock was 316 ft (96 m) in length and 76 ft (23 m) in breadth, with an entrance 60 ft (18 m) wide. HMS Herald was the first sailing vessel to enter the dock in December 1857. The Fitzroy Dock was lengthened in 1870–1880 to 643 ft (196 m).

=== Number 1 (Sutherland) Dock ===
The dock was constructed under the supervision of the engineer Louis Samuel between 1882 and 1890. The dock was named after John Sutherland, the Secretary for Public Works and was large enough to accommodate ships of 20,000 t (20,000 long tons; 22,000 short tons). The dock was modified in 1913 and in 1927 to accommodate Royal Australian Navy ships.

=== Industrial School, Reformatory and Gaol ===
In 1864, the island was split between the NSW Department of Prisons and the Public Works Department, which expanded the dockyard around the foreshores. In 1869, the convicts were relocated to Darlinghurst Gaol and the prison complex became an Industrial School for Girls and also a Reformatory.

== Cockatoo Island Dockyard ==
Mural of a cockatoo on the top island

Shipbuilding began on Cockatoo Island in 1870. In 1913, Cockatoo Island was transferred to the Commonwealth Government to become the Naval Dockyard of the Royal Australian Navy. Over a period of several years prior to World War I, five slipways were either upgraded or constructed in the island, with Numbers 1 and 2 still retained by the Sydney Harbour Federation Trust.

The torpedo boat destroyer HMAS Warrego was the first naval ship launched at Cockatoo Island, after being built in the United Kingdom, disassembled, then sent to the Australian shipyard for reassembly. During World War I, the dockyard built, repaired and refitted many ships. At its peak during the war, some 4,000 men were employed on the island.

In 1933, Cockatoo Island was leased to the Cockatoo Docks & Engineering Company for 21 years. The lease was renewed in 1954 for a further 20 years and again in 1972 for 21 years.

In 1995, community action played an important role in the preservation of the place. A group 'Friends of Cockatoo Island' was founded by Jack Clark and his wife Mary Shelley Clark, to fight for the preservation of the Island and other former Defence sites around Sydney Harbour. Their and other group's campaigns resulted in the Federal Government's decision to establish the Sydney Harbour Federation Trust which aimed to protect many Harbour sites including the Cockatoo Island.

== Heritage listings ==
In July 2010, at the 34th session of the UNESCO World Heritage Committee, Cockatoo Island and ten other Australian sites with a significant association with convict transportation were inscribed as a group on the World Heritage List as the Australian Convict Sites. The listing explains that the eleven sites present "the best surviving examples of large-scale convict transportation and the colonial expansion of European powers through the presence and labour of convicts". Of the eleven sites, as well as Cockatoo Island, the Hyde Park Barracks, Old Great North Road, and Old Government House at Parramatta are also within the Sydney region.

Parts of Cockatoo Island are the subject of other heritage listings. Listed on the Commonwealth Heritage List are:

- Cockatoo Island Industrial Conservation Area
- Prison Barracks Precinct
  - Convict Barracks Block
  - Military Guard Room
  - Mess Hall
- Underground Grain Silos
- Biloela House precinct
- Fitzroy Dock
- Sutherland Dock
- Power House & Pump House

== Cockatoo Island events ==
Since 2005, Cockatoo Island has hosted a number of major events. They range from collaborations with the Sydney Writers' Festival to an international freestyle motocross competition. A summary is provided in the following table:

Festival name	Details and comments
Biennale of Sydney	In 2008, Cockatoo Island became a major venue for the Biennale of Sydney. The contemporary arts festival attracted approximately 86,000 visitors to the island over 10 weeks. In 2010, the island hosted the 17th Biennale of Sydney. Over 120 works of art by 56 artists were exhibited and attracted approximately 157,000 people. During 2012, the 18th Biennale of Sydney was held, with Cockatoo Island being the main festival venue.
Cockatoo Island Festival	In 2005, a three-day music and arts festival was held on the refurbished island, utilising abandoned buildings and warehouses as exhibition rooms, concert halls and shopping/food venues. The festival was headlined by local and international musical groups and artists. The festival attracted over 20,000 people and featured over 120 musical acts, as well as stand-up comedians, performance artists and more. A dedicated ferry service ran day and night to take ticket holders to and from the island. The festival did not return to the island in this format and was reborn elsewhere as The Great Escape in 2006.
Cockatoo Island Film Festival	October 2012.
Urs Fischer Installation	In 2007, Cockatoo Island hosted an art installation by New York-based Swiss artist Urs Fischer. The installation was a partnership with Kaldor Public Art Projects.
Red Bull X-Fighters World Tour Finale	The final of the world's leading freestyle motocross competition in conjunction with Wingman Marketing Australia was held on Cockatoo Island for the first time in October 2011, and is scheduled for October 2012.
Sydney Festival	In 2009, Cockatoo Island was the venue for a major component of the Sydney Festival, the Nick Cave–curated All Tomorrow's Parties music festival. The event attracted approximately 12,000 people.
Underbelly Festival	In 2010, Cockatoo Island hosted the Underbelly Festival, a collaboration of 150 artists on innovative and experimental projects over a 10-day residency and festival finale.
Ken Unsworth Installations	In 2009, the artist Ken Unsworth's tribute to his wife, A Ringing Glass (Rilke) was an ambitious installation of galleries constructed inside the island's Turbine Shop. In 2011, Unsworth returned to Cockatoo Island with As I Crossed the Bridge of Dreams, a show incorporating dance, sculptural creations, music and song.
World's Funniest Island Comedy Festival	In 2009, Cockatoo Island hosted the comedy festival. Held over two days, it attracted approximately 8000 people.
Haunting: Australia Television Show	In 2013, paranormal investigation television show, Haunting: Australia, investigated Cockatoo Island for alleged paranormal activity. The show aired to high ratings around the world including on REALLY UKTV in the UK, and SYFY in the USA. Haunting: Australia features Australian Allen Tiller, and international paranormal investigators, Robb Demarest, Gaurav Tiwari, Rayleen Kable, Ian Lawman and Ray Jorden.

== Planning and projects ==
Stewardship of Cockatoo Island was handed to the Sydney Harbour Federation Trust in 2001 to plan a new chapter for the island as publicly owned urban park. In 2003 the Harbour Trust completed a comprehensive plan for Cockatoo Island and other sites around Sydney Harbour managed by the Trust. The initial plan, approved by the Minister in 2003, proposed the revitalisation of Cockatoo Island as a landmark harbour attraction with the revival of maritime activities, the interpretation of its rich colonial and industrial heritage, and the creation of parklands and spaces for cultural events. In 2010, the Harbour Trust produced a revised management plan for the island.

=== Urban Islands ===
In 2009 the Urban Islands masterclass was taught "by 3 groups of international emerging architects on and about the controversial site of Cockatoo Island":

Cross disciplinary creativity, experimental tactics and broad based participation are needed to inject Cockatoo Island with renewed life. The proposals developed in the 12-days play an active role in generating tangible proposals for Cockatoo Island, producing outcomes such as large-scale installations, futurologist proposals, media activism experiments, and greater harbour master planning visions.

One of the masterclass leaders was Geoff Manaugh, author of the influential BLDGBLOG. A second masterclass was planned for 2011.

== Transport ==
When a working dockyard, Sydney Ferries Limited and its successors operated services from Circular Quay to the island at shift changeover times.

In April 2007, the wharf reopened for a three-month trial coinciding with the reopening of the island as a tourist attraction. Since then services have expanded, and today it is served by Sydney Ferries Parramatta River services operating between Circular Quay and Parramatta. It is also the terminus for all stops Cockatoo Island ferry services from Circular Quay.
