= Measuring the Universe =

2007 artwork by Roman Ondák

Measuring the Universe is a performance art work by Slovak artist Roman Ondak first installed in the Pinakothek der Moderne in Munich in 2007. The exhibition starts as a blank white wall and begins to fill when museum guards mark visitors' height along with their name and the current date. It is in the collection of Tate Modern in London, Pinakothek der Moderne in Munich and MoMA in New York.

== Materials ==
The only items required for the installation were a white room and a few black markers. What began as a clean white space has been filled with letters and lines and numbers as people pass through the gallery. Each tiny line represents a different person. The thousands and thousands of lines show just how many people pass through the museum each day, and how many people have been affected by this installation.

== Sources ==
- MoMA
- artbabble.org, Video Interview with Roman Ondak
- CCA Wattis Institute for Contemporary Arts
- Roman Ondák's Measuring the Universe: 90,000 people created this artwork, Public Delivery
- Roman Ondák. Measuring the Universe. 2007, MoMA Learning
