= Exotica (band) =

French musical duo

- Origin: Paris, France
- Genres: Electropop
- Years active: 2010–present
- Label: chambre404
- Members: Clara Cometti; Julien Galner
- Website: helloexotica.tumblr.com

Exotica is a Parisian electropop duo made up of Clara Cometti and Julien Galinier. They met in Paris in 2005 where their respective bands Chateau Marmont and Koko Von Napoo played on the same bill. They have cited 80s Synthesiser music and French electro pop duo Elli et Jacno as influences. In 2016 their cover of Françoise Hardy's 'une miss s'immisce' was included on the soundtrack of Xavier Dolan's film It's Only the End of the World.

== Discography ==
Albums

- La vierge et le lion (2014)

EPs

- Désorbitée (2013)

Singles

- Control Freak (2013)
