= John Kaldor =

Australian art collector, philanthropist (born 1936)

John Kaldor AO
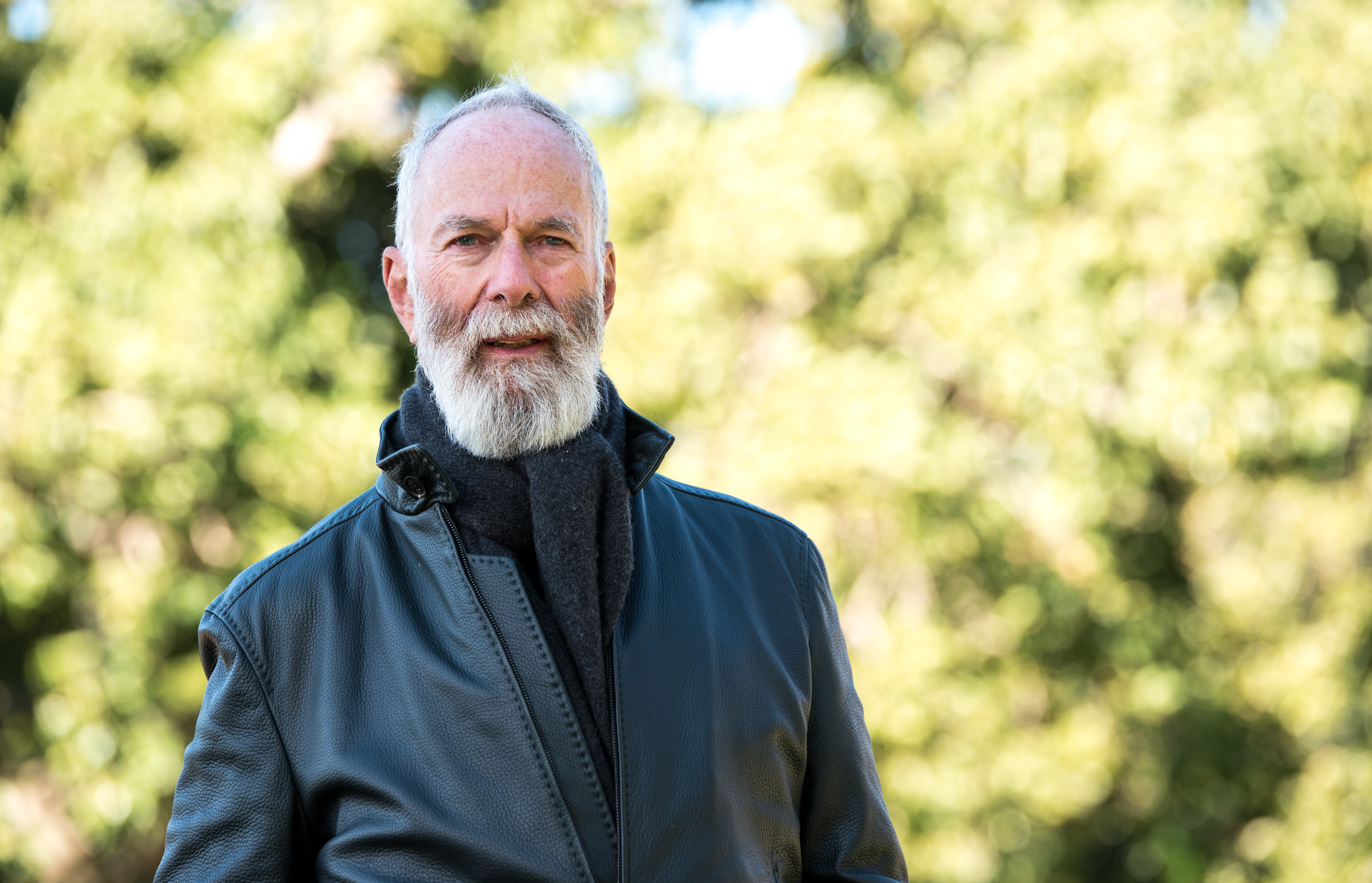
- Kaldor in July 2016
- Born: 1936 (age 89–90); Budapest, Hungary
- Education: Saint Ignatius' College, Riverview
- Alma mater: Textile College of Zurich
- Known for: Kaldor Public Art Projects; philanthropy
- Style: Textile designer and manufacturer
- Spouse: Naomi Milgrom AC (div.)

John William Kaldor AO (born 1936 in Budapest) is an Australian art collector, philanthropist, and the founder of Kaldor Public Art Projects.

== Biography ==
Kaldor was born in Budapest to textile manufacturers Andrew and Vera Kaldor. After a short time in Paris as a refugee, Kaldor moved to Australia in 1949 with his parents and younger brother Andrew. Kaldor was educated at Saint Ignatius' College, Riverview, studied in the United Kingdom, and attended the Textile College of Zurich under the direction of Johannes Itten. After working for Universal Textiles, in 1970 he founded his own textile manufacturing company, John Kaldor Fabricmaker, in Australia, which expanded to the United States and the United Kingdom. In 2002, the company ceased operation in Australia and the US, but continued in the UK.

Kaldor has undertaken thirty-two contemporary art projects, working with international artists including Christo and Jeanne-Claude, Gilbert and George, Sol LeWitt, Richard Long, Jeff Koons, Charlotte Moorman with Nam June Paik, and Marina Abramović. In 1990, Kaldor brought Christo to Australia for a twenty-year retrospective at the Art Gallery of New South Wales. Kaldor has been chair of the Museum of Contemporary Art Board, and a trustee of the Art Gallery of New South Wales, and has participated on the boards of the Tate Modern, MoMA PS1, and the Biennale of Sydney. He currently serves on the International Council of the Museum of Modern Art.

In 2008, Kaldor gifted his collection of more than 260 works to the Art Gallery of New South Wales, including works by Robert Rauschenberg, Richard Long, Christo and Jeanne-Claude, Sol LeWitt, Jeff Koons, Ugo Rondinone, and Bill Viola. At the time, the collection was valued at A$35 million, and it is the most significant donation made to the Gallery.

Kaldor was appointed a Member of the Order of Australia in 1993 for service to the arts, and in 2016 was appointed an Officer of the Order of Australia for distinguished service to contemporary visual art, as a supporter of public art projects, to the development of education programs for children, and through philanthropic contributions to cultural institutions.

He married Naomi Milgrom, the chair and group CEO of the Sussan Corporation in 2007. They divorced in 2024.
