= Roman Ondak =

Slovak conceptual artist

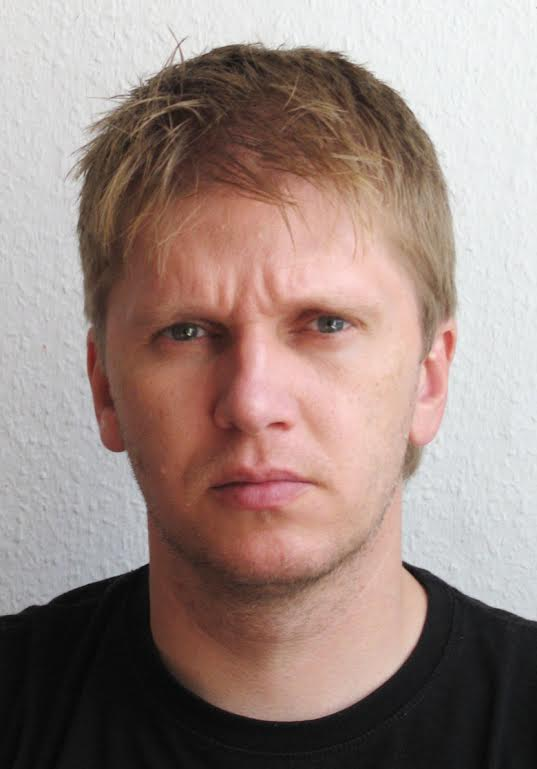
- Ondak in 2007
- Born: 5 August 1966 (age 60); Žilina, Czechoslovakia
- Years active: 1990-
- Known for: Conceptual art
- Notable work: Measuring the Universe (2007) Loop (2009) Swap (2011)

Roman Ondak (born 5 August 1966) is a Slovak conceptual artist.

== Life and career ==
Roman Ondak was born in Žilina, Czechoslovakia (now Slovakia). He studied at Academy of Fine Arts and Design in Bratislava from 1988 to 1994.

Roman Ondak has been awarded the 2018 winner of the Lovis Corinth Prize.

== Selected works ==
- Dubbing (2001)
- Good Feelings In Good Times (2003)
- Spirit and Opportunity (2004)
- It Will All Turn Out Right in the End (2005)
- More Silent Than Ever (2006)
- Measuring the Universe (2007)
- Time Capsule (2011)
- Loop (2009)
- do not walk outside this area (2012)
- Signature (2014)
- Planets I - X (2018)
- New Observations (1995 / 2018)
- Perfect Society (2019)

== Exhibitions ==
Biennale in Venezia (1999, 2003, 2009, 2011)

- 2006: Tate Modern in London (2006)
- 2007: Pinakothek der Moderne in München (2007)
- 2008: Measuring the Universe, DAAD Galerie, Berlin
- 2009: Measuring the Universe, Museum of Modern Art, New York
- 2010: Shaking Horizon, Villa Arson, Nice
- 2010: Before Waiting Becomes Part of Your Life, Salzburg Kunstverein
- 2010-2011: Measuring the Universe, Stedelijk Museum, Amsterdam
- 2011: Time Capsule, Modern Art Oxford, Oxford
- 2011: Measuring the Universe, Tate St Ives
- 2011: Enter the Orbit. Kunsthaus Zürich
- 2012: Within Reach of Hand or Eye, K21, Düsseldorf
- 2012: Do not walk outside this area, Deutsche Guggenheim, Berlin
- 2012: Roman Ondak, Musée d’art moderne de la Ville de Paris /ARC, Paris
- 2012: Within Reach of Hand and Eye. Kunstsammlung Nordrhein-Westfalen K21, Düsseldorf
- 2012: DOCUMENTA 13
- 2013: Escena, Museo Nacional Centro de Arte Reina Sofia, Madrid
- 2013: Some Thing, The Common Guild, Glasgow
- 2014: Roman Ondak, Kaldor Art Projects, Sydney
- 2015: Storyboard, Times Museum, Guangzhou
- 2016: The Source of Art is in the Life of a People, South London Gallery, London
- 2017: History Repeats Itself, KUNSTEN Museum of Modern Art, Aalborg
- 2017: Man Walking Toward a Fata Morgana, The Arts Club of Chicago, Chicago
- 2018: Objects in the Mirror, BASE Progetti per l’arte Arte, Florence
- 2018-2019: #12 Roman Ondak, mezzaterra 11, Belluno
- 2018: Based on True Events, Lovis-Corinth-Preis, Kunstforum Ostdeutsche Galerie, Regensburg
- 2021: SK Parking, Kunsthalle Bratislava
- 2022: Roman Ondak – Measuring the Universe, Pinakothek der Moderne, Munich
- 2025: Roman Ondak: The Day After Yesterday, Kunsthalle Praha

== Art in public collections ==
Ludwig Museum Budapest (Hungary), Slovenská národná galéria/ Slovak National Gallery in Bratislava (Slovakia), Kunsthalle Praha (Czech Republic), TATE Gallery London (UK), Centre Pompidou, Musée National d’Art Moderne, Paris (France), MUMOK (Museum Moderner Kunst Stiftung Ludwig Wien) Vienna (Austria), Museum of Modern Art, New York (USA), Art Collection Telekom Berlin (Germany), Boros Collection Berlin (Germany), Musée d’art moderne de la Ville de Paris (FR)

== Awards ==
- 2009: Nomination for Hugo Boss Prize
- 2012: Awarded Best Artist of the Year elected by the Deutsche Bank
- 2018: Awarded Lovis Corinth Preis

== See also ==
- List of invisible artworks

== Bibliography ==
- OBRIST H.U. - ZABEL, I. - SCHöLLHAMMER G. - FRANGENDERG F. Roman Ondák : [anlässlich der Ausstellung Roman Ondák "Spirit and Opportunity" im Kölnischen Kunstverein, 1.5. - 27.6.2004]. Köln : Verlag der Buchhandlung Walther König, 2005. 222 pages. ISBN 978-3-88375-961-6.
- HLAVAJOVÁ M. - ELBMAYR S. Roman Ondák. Köln : Verlag der Buchhandlung Walther König, 2007. 152 pages, ISBN 978-3-86560-332-6.
- SCHWENK B. - GRIFFIN J. - ETCHELLS T. - ARRIOLA M. Roman Ondák : measuring the universe. Zürich : JRP Ringier, 2008. 168 nečíslovaných strán. Bawag Foundation Edition; volume 9Christoph Keller Editions. ISBN 978-3-03764-024-1.
- (ed.) BIRNBAUM D. - VOLZ J. La Biennale di Venezia. : 53. Esposizione Internazionale d` Arte : Fare Mondi = 53rd International Art Exhibition : Making Worlds 1st ed. Venezia : Marsilio, 2009. 307 pages.
- (ed.) KLUMPP, N.- (ed. HüTTE F. - FILIPOVIC E. - De WECK P. - KITTELMANN U. - RATTEMEYER Ch. Roman Ondák : notebook. Ostfildern : Hatje Cantz Verlag, 2012. 298 strán. Deutsche Bank art works. ISBN 978-3-7757-3343-4.
- MACEL Christine - PETREŠIN- BACHELEZ Nataša. Promises of the past : a discontinuous history of art in former eastern Europe. Zurich : JRP / Ringier, 2010. 254 pages. ISBN 978-3-03764-099-9.
- Roman Ondak. Based on The True Events : [Lovis-Corinth Preis 2018, anlässlich der Ausstellung 15. 5- 9.9. 2018]. Regensburg : Verlag Kunstforum Ostdeutsch Galerie Regensburg, 2018. 48 pp. ISBN 978-3-96098-367-7
