= Garden Palace =

Exhibition building in Sydney, Australia destroyed by fire 1882

Coordinates: 33.86460°S 151.21293°E

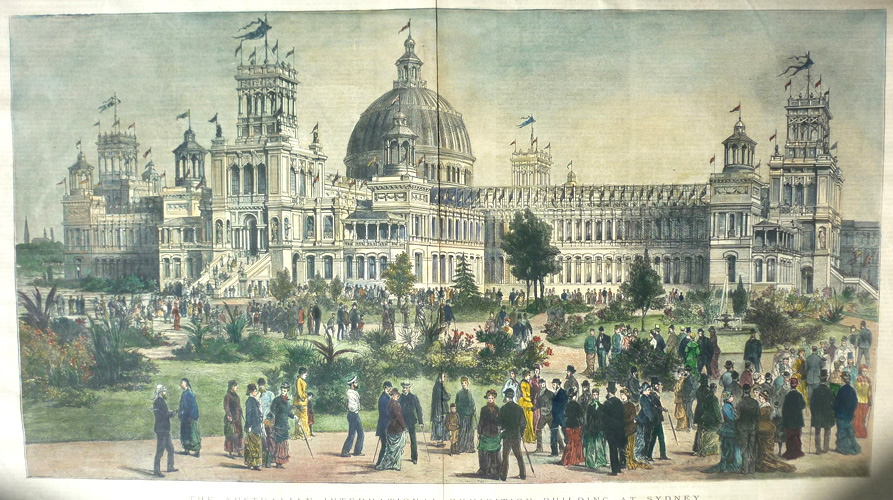
Garden Palace at the Sydney International Exhibition (1879)

The Garden Palace was a large, purpose-built exhibition building constructed to house the Sydney International Exhibition in 1879 in Sydney, Australia. In 1882 it was completely destroyed by fire. It was designed by James Barnet and constructed by John Young, at a cost of £191,800 in only eight months. This was largely due to the importation from England of electric lighting, which enabled work to be carried out around the clock.

Following the exhibition, it was used by the Technological, Industrial and Sanitary Museum of New South Wales, now known as the Museum of Applied Arts and Sciences or the Powerhouse Museum.

== Description and history ==
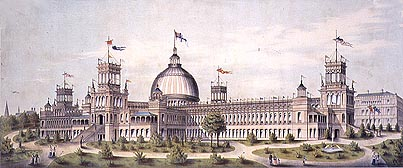
An 1879 engraving

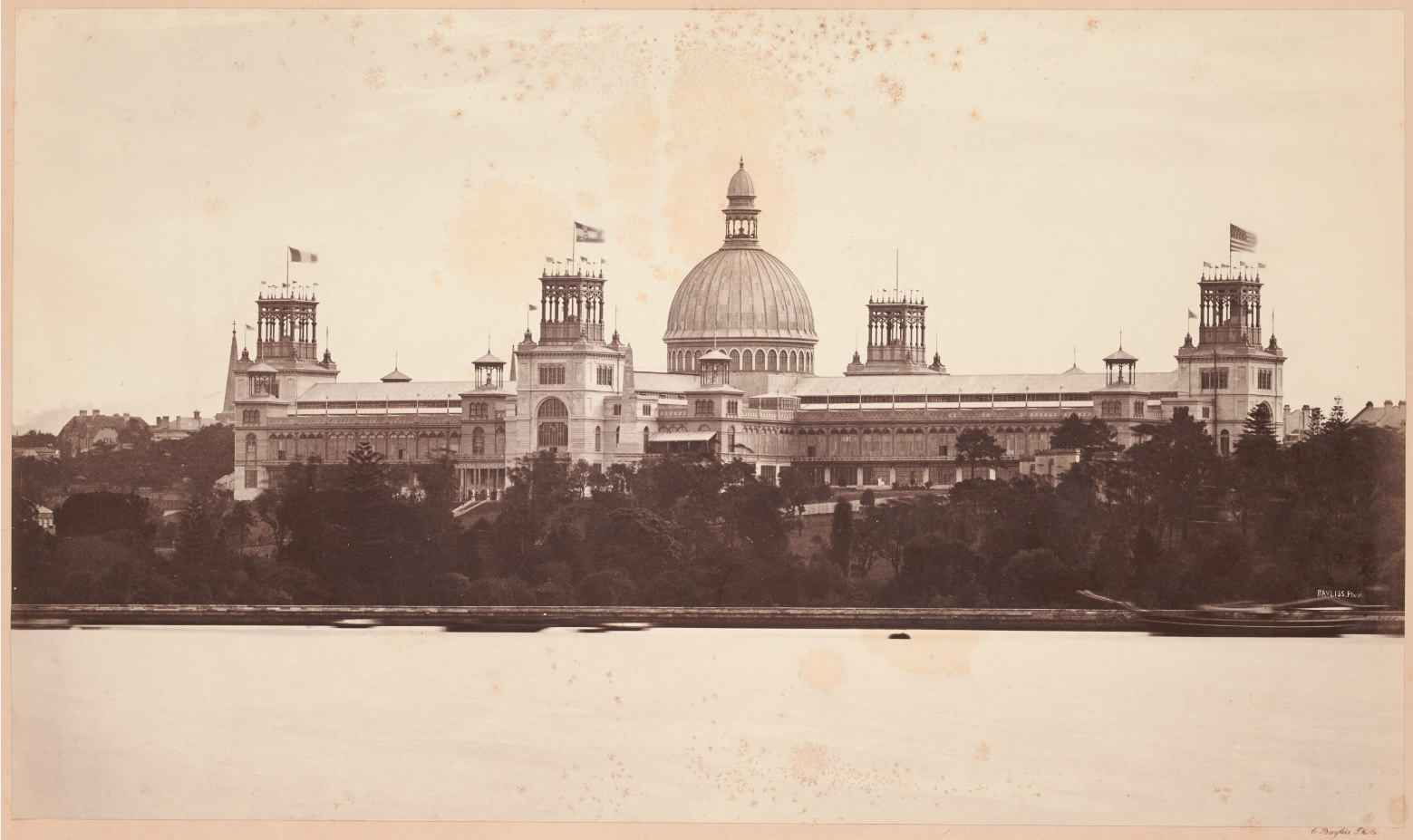
The palace in 1880

A reworking of London's Crystal Palace, the plan for the Garden Palace was similar to that of a large cathedral, having a long hall with lower aisle on either side, like a nave, and a transept of similar form, each terminating in towers and meeting beneath a central dome. The successful contractor was John Young, a highly experienced building contractor who had worked on the Crystal Palace for The Great Exhibition of 1851 and locally on the General Post Office and Exhibition Building at Prince Alfred Park.

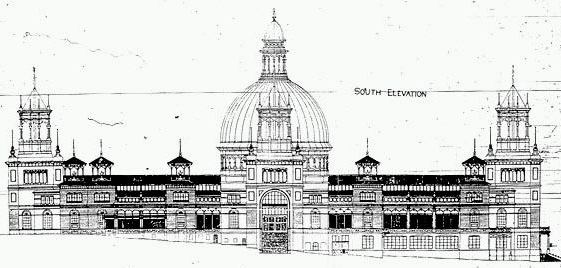
Sydney's Garden Palace; an architectural drawing from the 1870s

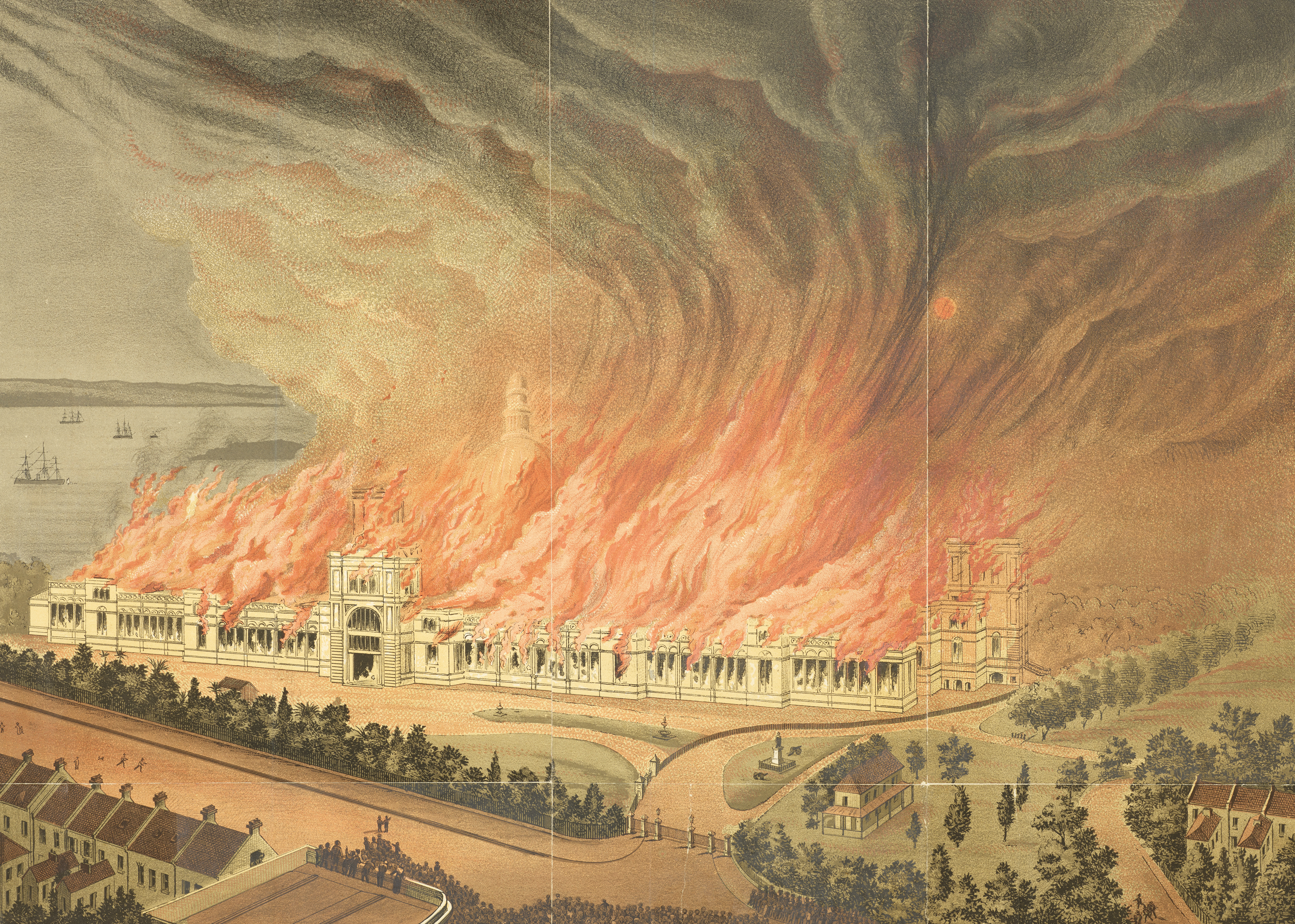
Garden Palace fire, Illustrated Sydney News, 1882.

The dome was 100 feet (30 metres) in diameter and 210 feet (64 metres) in height. The building was over 244 metres long and had a floor space of over 112,000 metres with 4.5 million feet of timber, 2.5 million bricks and 243 tons of galvanised corrugated iron. The building was similar in many respects to the later Royal Exhibition Building in Melbourne. Sydney's first hydraulic lift, was contained in the north tower, enabling visitors to climb the tower. The Garden Palace was sited at what is today the southwestern end of the Royal Botanic Gardens (although at the time it was built it occupied land that was outside the gardens and in the Domain). It was constructed primarily from timber, which ensured its complete destruction when engulfed by fire in the early morning of 22 September 1882. The Garden Palace at that time was used by a number of Government Departments and many significant records were destroyed in the fire, notably records of squatting occupation in New South Wales. Between 500 and 1000 pieces of Sydney Aboriginal artefacts were also lost in this fire.

The only extant remains of the Garden Palace are its carved Sydney sandstone gateposts and wrought iron gates, located on the Macquarie Street entrance to the Royal Botanical Garden. A 1940s-era sunken garden and fountain featuring a statue of Cupid marks the former location of the Palace's dome. Few artefacts from the International Exhibition survived the fire. An 1878 Bechstein concert grand piano, that won a first prize, had luckily been removed from the Garden Palace prior to the fire, and is held by the Powerhouse Museum. A number of items are held by the State Library of NSW relating to The Garden Palace include a piece of glass melted by the fire, a handkerchief and a book, The Sydney Garden Palace : a patriotic and historical poem by Frederick Cumming.

== Gallery ==
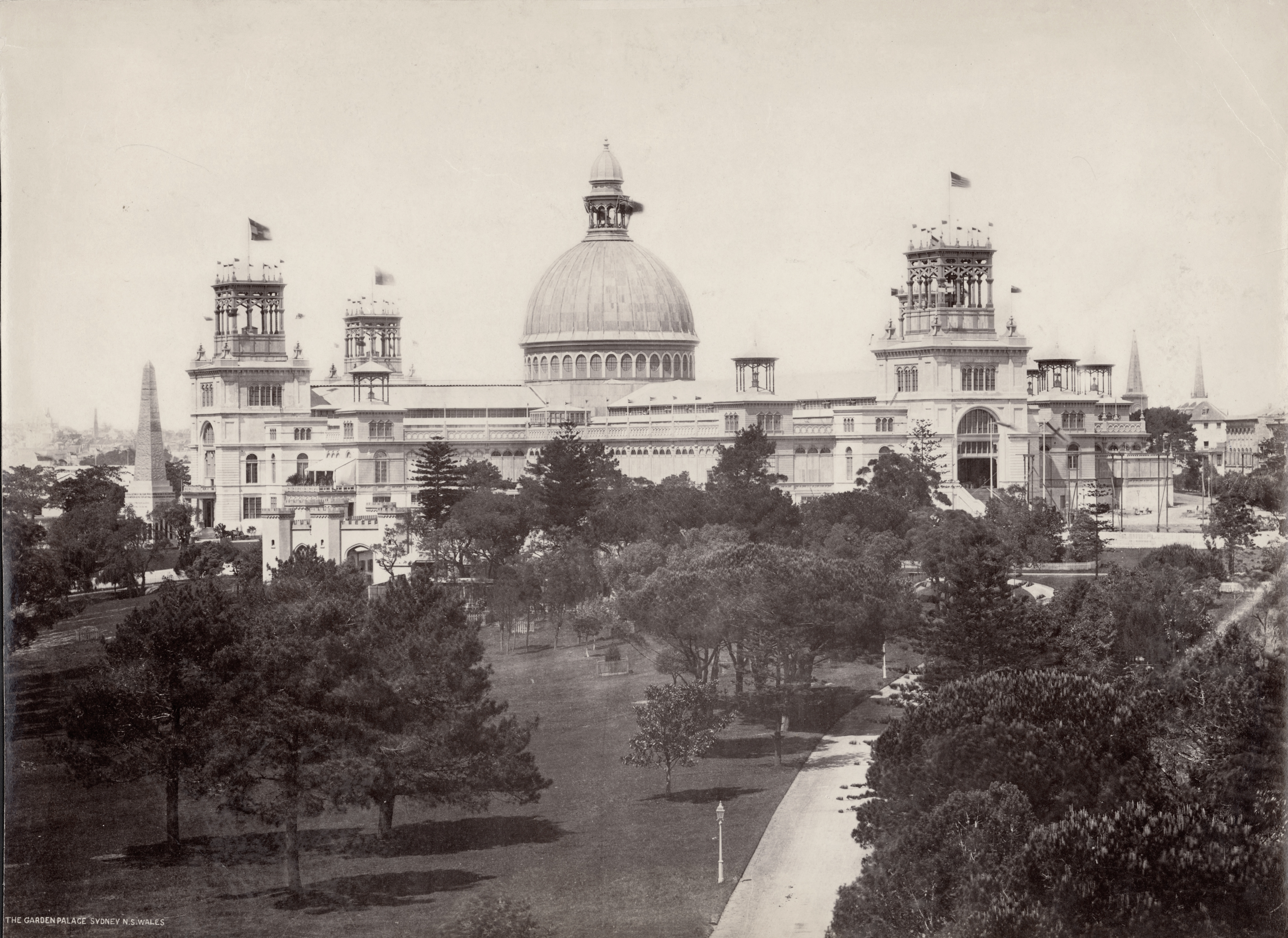
The Garden Palace, Sydney, c. 1880

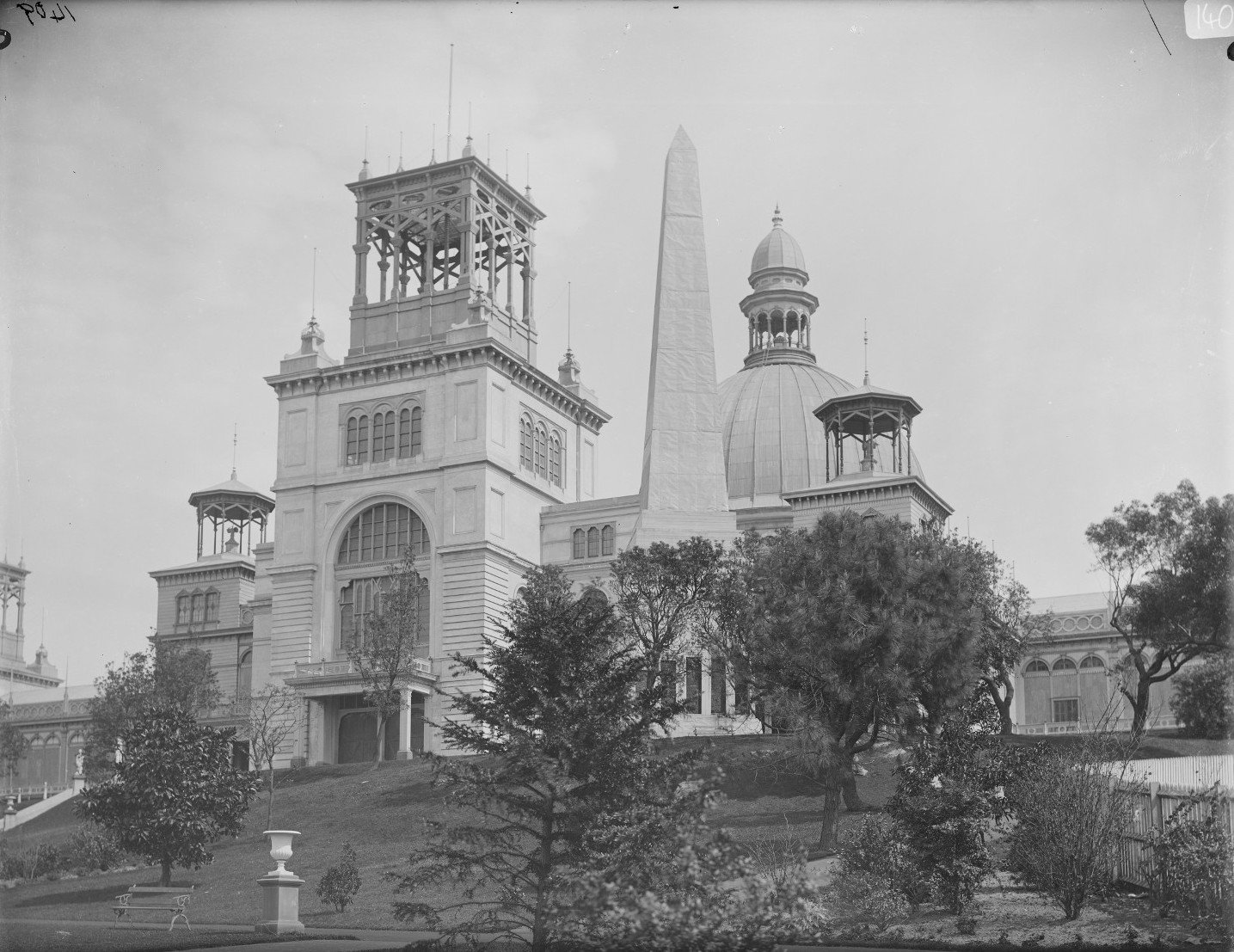
One of the towers

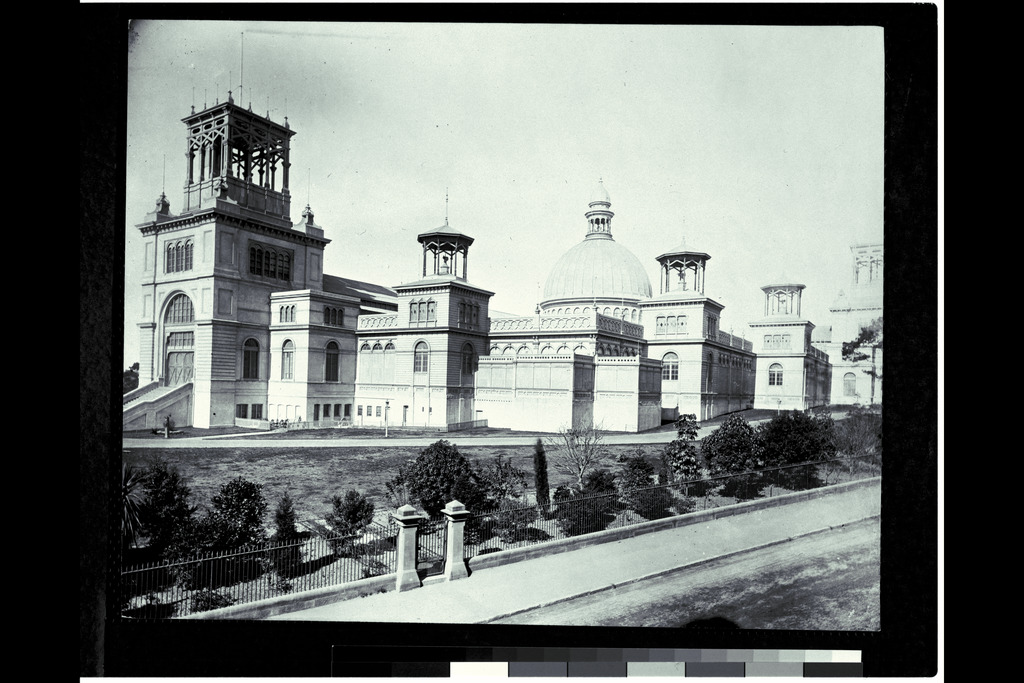
The Garden Palace

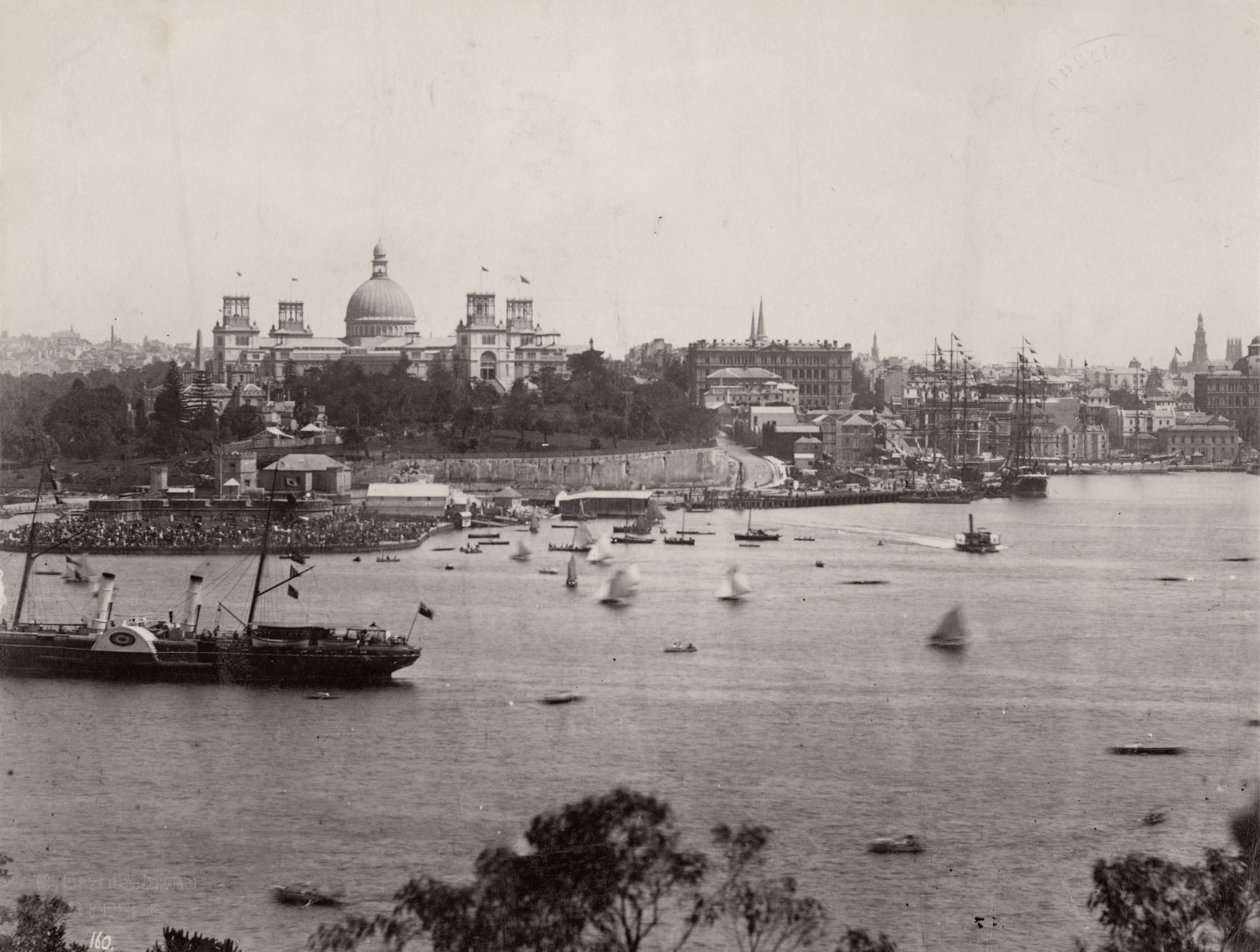
The Garden Palace and Farm Cove, Sydney, c. 1880

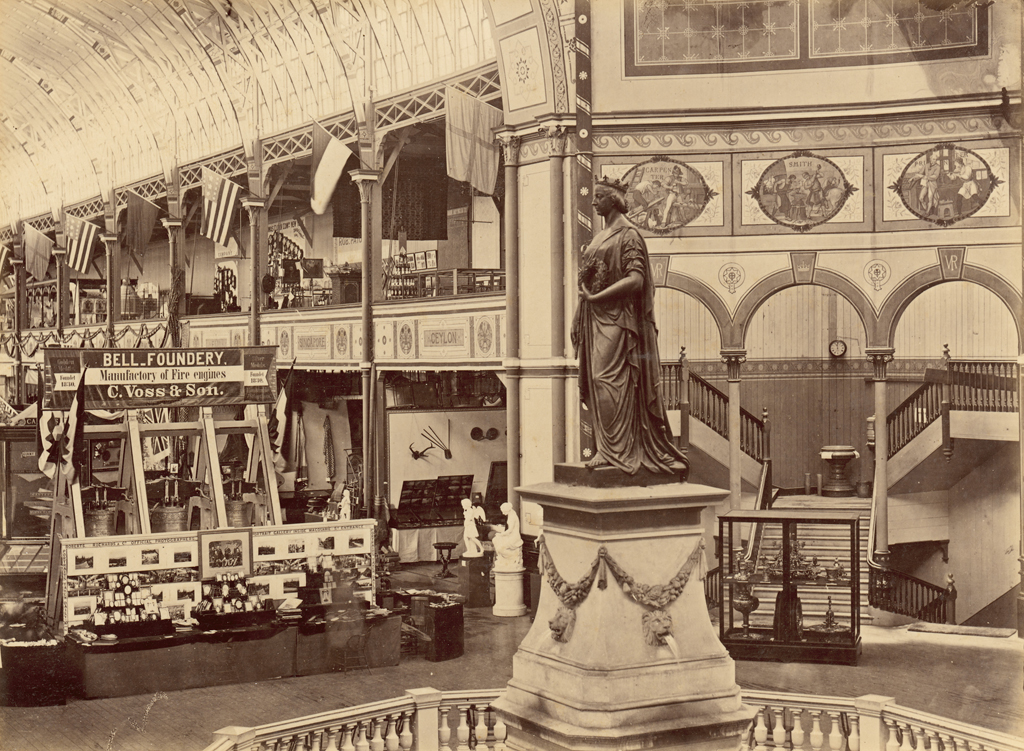
Statue of Queen Victoria, taken from under the dome

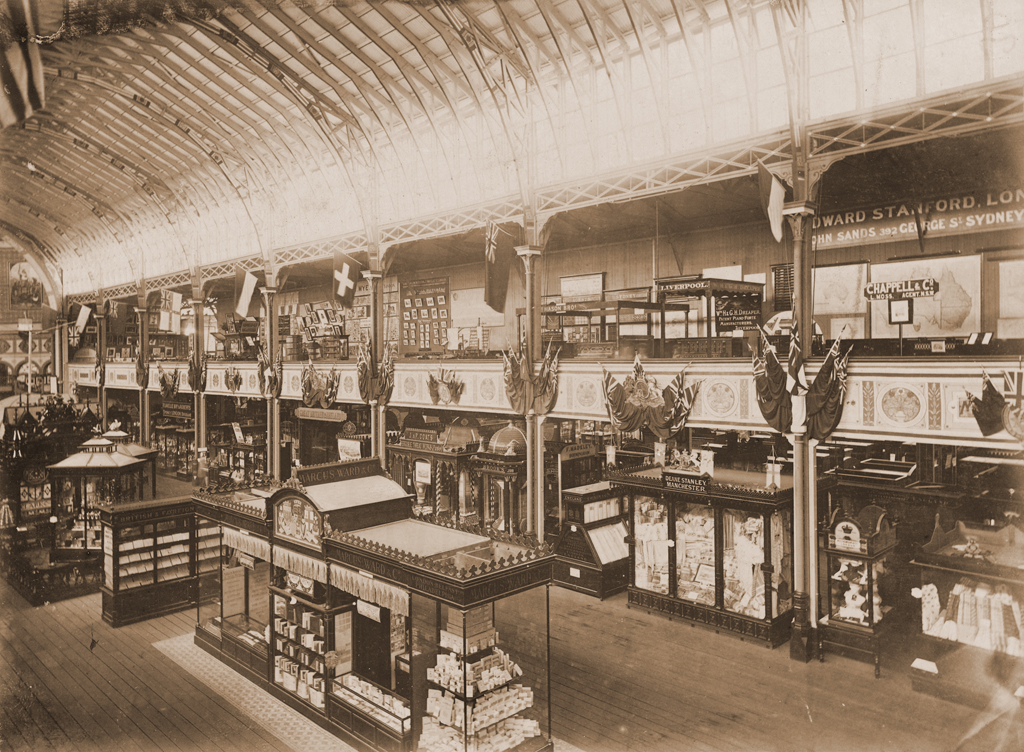
North Nave (taken from the Orchestra)

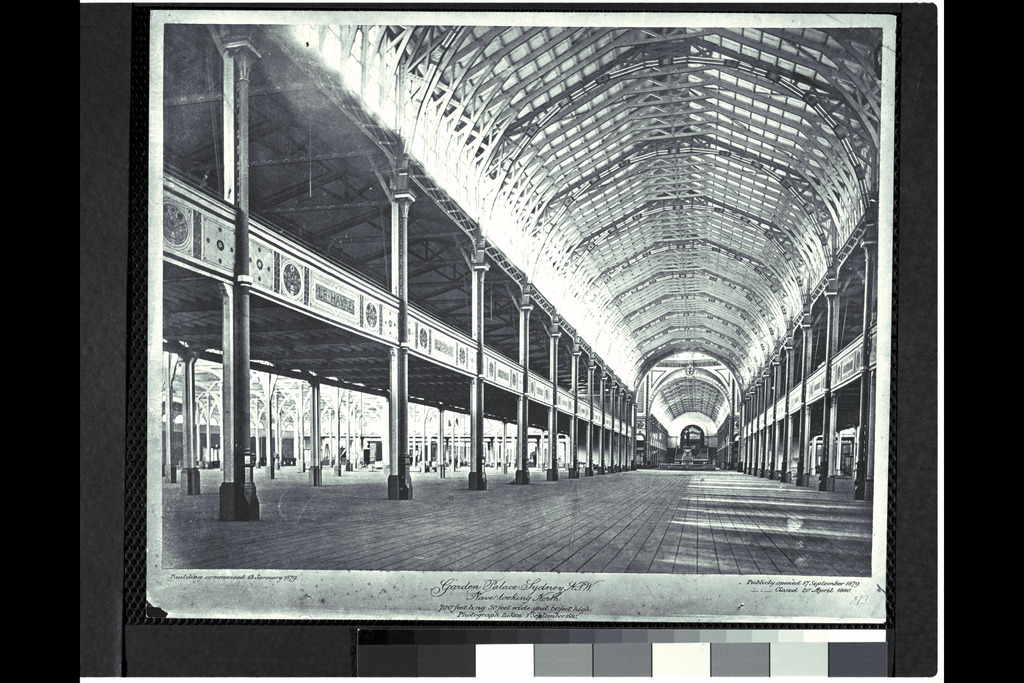
North nave

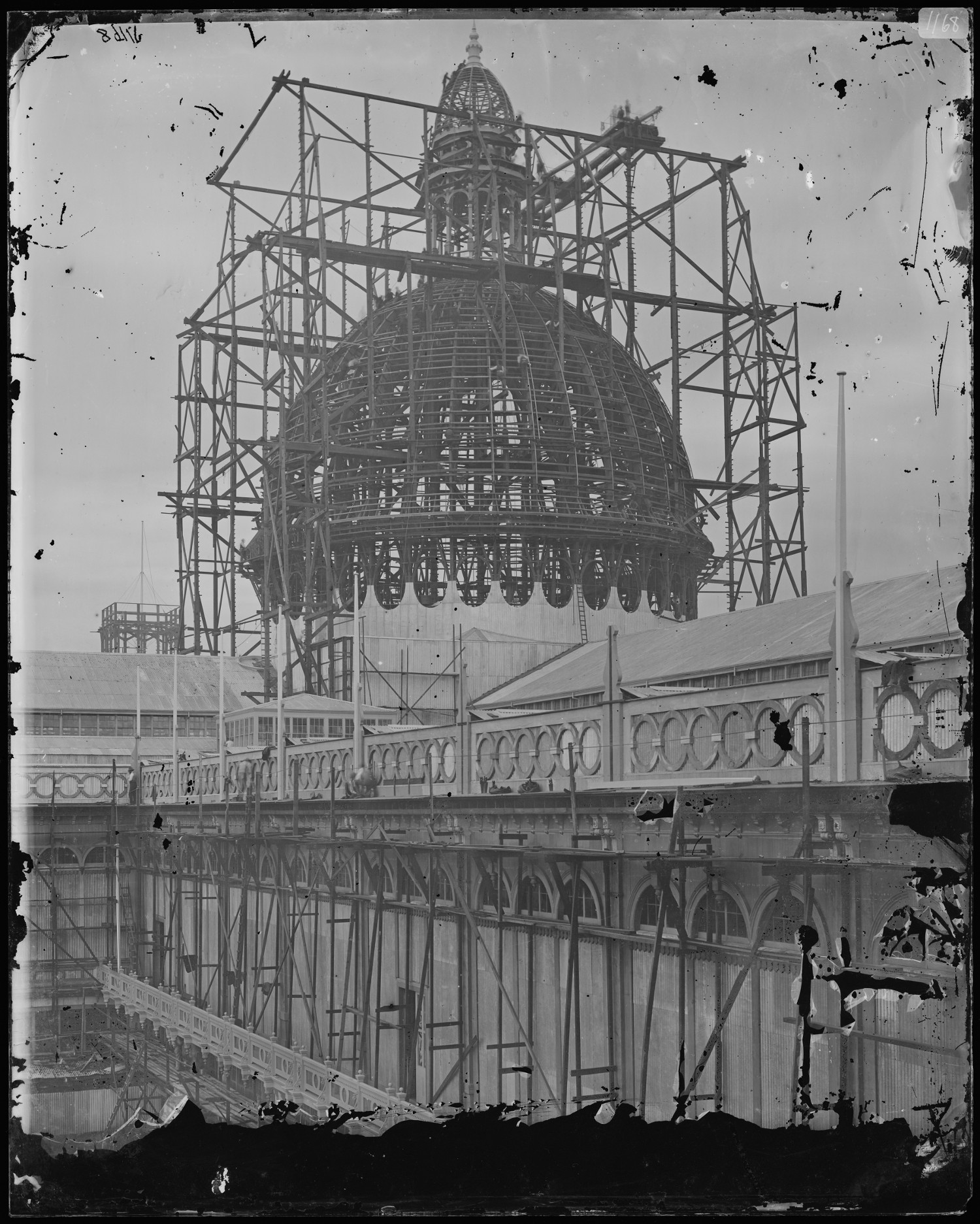
Construction of the dome

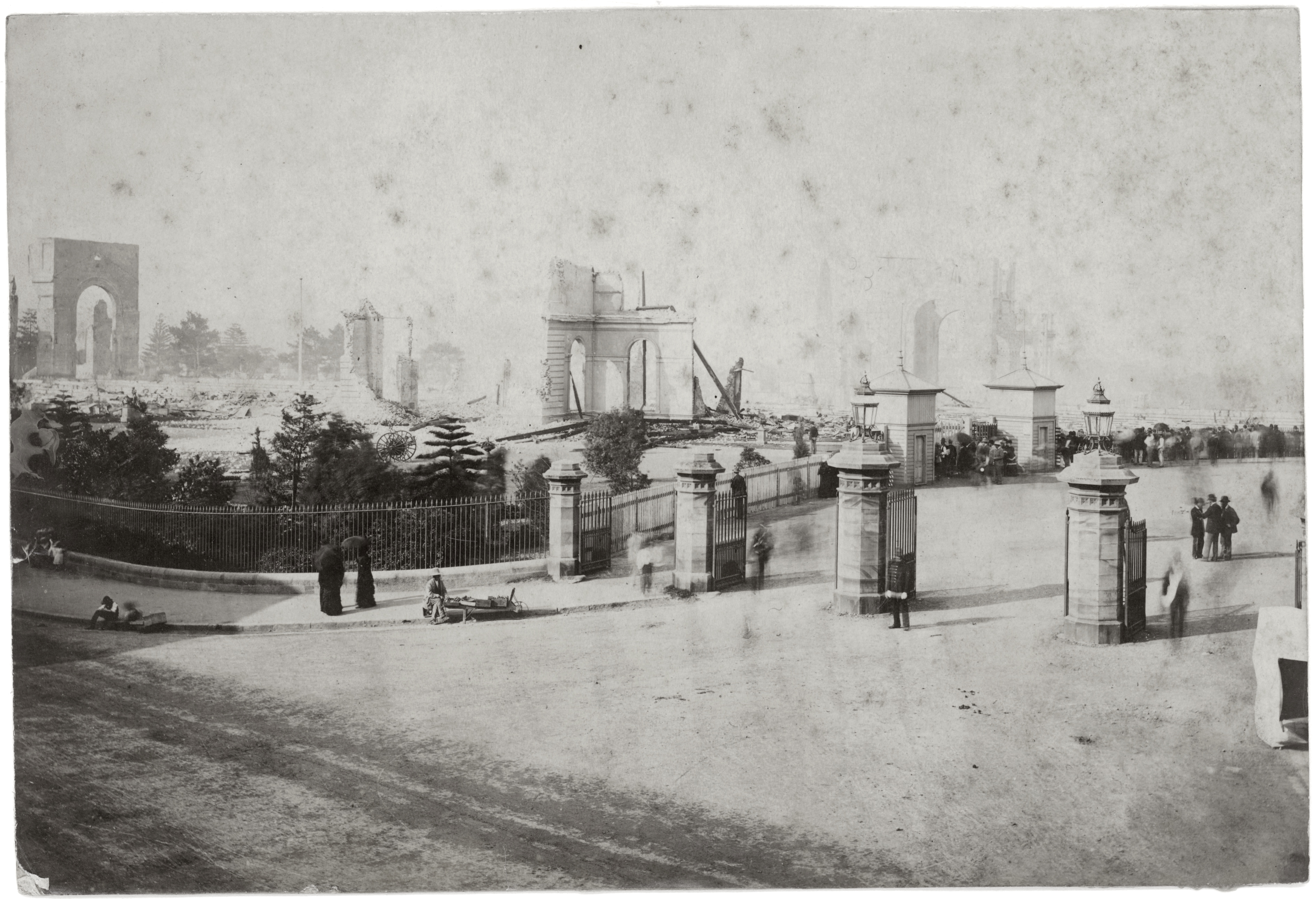
The Garden Palace in ruins after the fire, Macquarie Street entrance, 1882

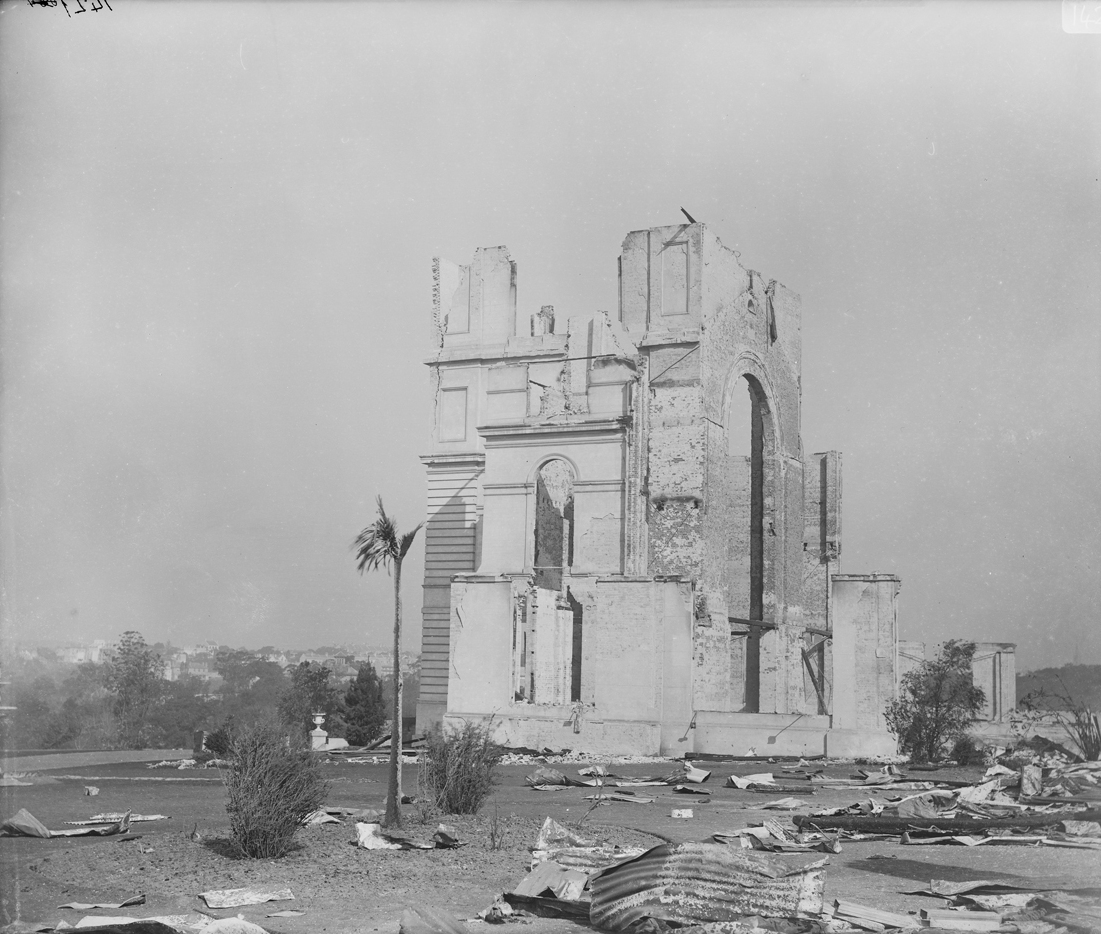
Ruins of the Garden Palace, 1882

== See also ==
- List of destroyed heritage
- The Crystal Palace — exhibition building in London
- New York Crystal Palace
- Royal Exhibition Building — Melbourne's exhibition building
