= BLDGBLOG =

Architecture blog authored by Geoff Manaugh

- Website: https://bldgblog.blogspot.com/

BLDGBLOG is an architecture and design blog founded in 2004 by writer and educator Geoff Manaugh. Manaugh is a former editor at Dwell, former Editor-in-Chief at Gizmodo, and a contributing editor at Wired UK. In an academic capacity, Manaugh has taught design and theory at the Columbia University GSAPP, the University of Southern California, and the Southern California Institute of Architecture.

The blog covers topics such as urban speculation, technology, and landscape. It has been covered by publications including The Wall Street Journal, The Atlantic and The Architectural Review. Manaugh's book A Burglar's Guide to the City was published by Farrar, Straus and Giroux and was named by Amazon as one of the best books of 2016.

== Bibliography ==
The BLDGBLOG Book was published by Chronicle Books in April 2009. The book adapts essays and images from the website, with new content written specifically for the publication.
