= Australian native police =

Colonial military force used in Australia

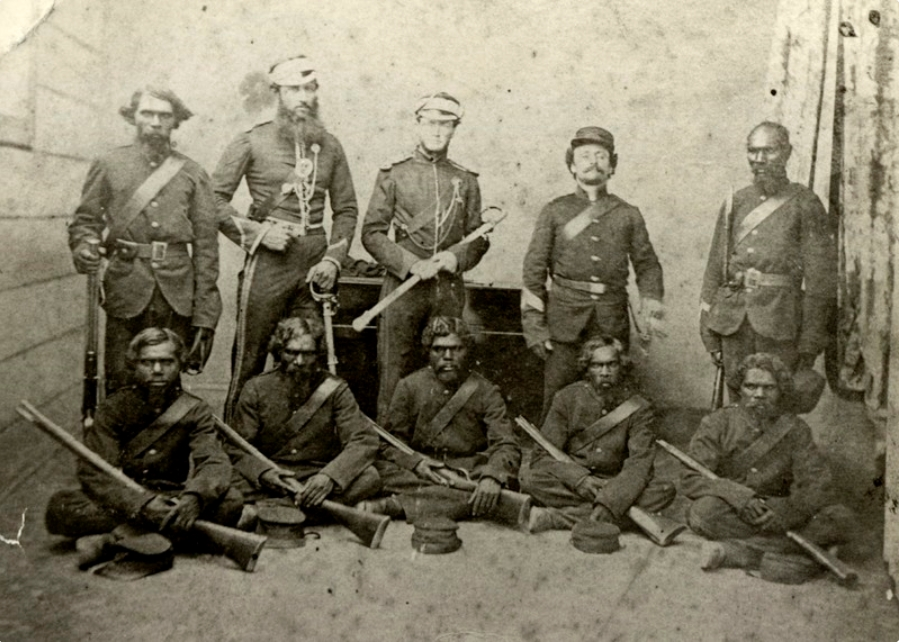
Native Police unit, Rockhampton, Queensland, 1864

Australian native police were mounted units comprising Aboriginal troopers under the command of European officers appointed by British colonial governments. The units existed in various forms in colonial Australia during the nineteenth and, in some cases, into the twentieth centuries. From temporary base camps and barracks, Native Police were primarily used to patrol the often vast geographical areas along the colonial frontier, in order to conduct indiscriminate raids or punitive expeditions against Aboriginal people. The Native Police proved to be a brutally destructive instrument in the disintegration and dispossession of Indigenous Australians. Armed with rifles, carbines and swords, they were also deployed to escort surveying groups, gold convoys, and groups of pastoralists and prospectors.

The Aboriginal men in the Native Police were routinely recruited from areas that were very distant from the locations in which they were deployed. That ensured they would have little familiarity with the local people they were employed to control, and would also reduce desertions. However, due to the excessively violent nature of the work, the rate of trooper desertion in some units was high. As the troopers were Aboriginal, the European colonists were able to minimise both the troopers' wages and the potential for Aboriginal revenge attacks against white people. It also increased the efficiency of the force because the Aboriginal troopers possessed highly developed tracking skills, which were indispensable in often poorly charted and difficult terrain.

The first government-funded force was the Native Police Corps, established in 1837 in the Port Phillip District of what is now Victoria. From 1848 another force was organised in New South Wales, which later evolved into the Queensland Native Police force. This force massacred thousands of Aboriginal people under the official euphemism of "dispersal", and is regarded as one of the most conspicuous examples of genocidal policy in colonial Australia. It existed until around 1915, when the last Native Police camps in Queensland were closed.

Native Police were also utilised by other Australian colonies. The government of South Australia set up a short-lived Native Police force in 1852, which was re-established in 1884 and deployed into what is now the Northern Territory. The colonial Western Australian government also initiated a formal Native Police force in 1840 under the command of John Nicol Drummond. Other privately funded native police systems were also occasionally used in Australia, such as the native constabulary organised by the Australian Agricultural Company in the 1830s. Native Police forces were also officially implemented in the Papua and New Guinea territories administered by colonial Queensland and Australian governments from 1890 until the 1970s. The Australian government also organised a Native Police force on Nauru during its administration of the island from 1923 until 1968.

== Early prototypes of native police ==
The general template for native police forces in Australia was the sepoy and sowar armies of the East India Company. However, the more compact forces of the Cape Regiment in southern Africa and the Kaffir and Malay Corps in Ceylon are a closer comparison. Before the creation of the first official Native Police forces, there were some informal and privately funded examples of using Aboriginal men as enforcers of land occupation by European settlers during colonisation.

=== Hawkesbury/Nepean ===
Armed Aboriginal men were used to capture runaway convicts in the region and John Macarthur sometimes appeared at public functions with a bodyguard of uniformed Dharawal and Gandangara men.

=== Bathurst ===
In 1824, at the conclusion of the Bathurst War against the Wiradjuri, Governor Thomas Brisbane sent a letter to Major James Thomas Morisset, commandant of the colonial forces at Bathurst, congratulating him on his efforts. In the letter, Brisbane outlined his desire to give "rewards to the natives who assisted in the police" and advised Morisset that he had "directed £50 subject to detailed accounts of its expenditure" to be at his disposal.

=== Van Diemen's Land ===
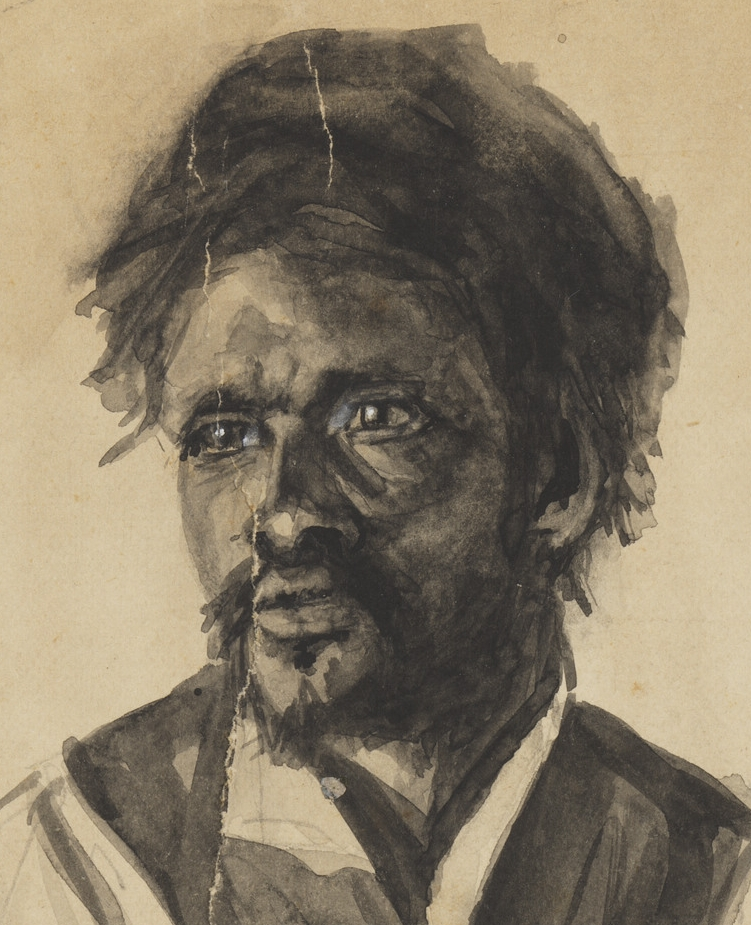
Tracker-turned-bushranger and resistance leader Musquito

Musquito was a Hawkesbury Aboriginal man who was exiled first to Norfolk Island in 1805, then to Van Diemen's Land in 1813. He proved to be a valuable asset to the government there in tracking down bushrangers. He later became a renegade and was himself tracked down and shot in the groin by another Hawkesbury aboriginal named Teague. Teague was sent by Hawkesbury settler Edward Luttrell to capture Musquito, on the promise of a whaleboat as payment. Teague never received the boat and Musquito was hanged in 1825.

In the 1830s, John Batman also used armed Aboriginal men from the Sydney region such as Pigeon and Tommy to assist in his roving parties to capture or kill indigenous Tasmanians.

=== Newcastle/Port Macquarie ===
Up until at least the 1830s, Aboriginal men around the Newcastle and Port Macquarie penal settlements were regularly used to recapture escaped convicts. Awabakal men such as Bob Barrett, Biraban and Jemmy Jackass would track down the runaways, disable them with spears or firearms, strip them, and return them to the soldiers in return for clothing, blankets, corn and tobacco.

In 1830, Bob Barrett was made a non-commissioned officer and given charge of a group of 11 other Aboriginal men in a paramilitary force that was to be sent to Tasmania to fight in the Black War against the Aboriginal people there. The detachment was to be headed by the commissary officer at Port Macquarie George James MacDonald, but the colonial authorities disbanded the unit before it was deployed.

=== Port Stephens ===
At Port Stephens, the Australian Agricultural Company had obtained a million acre land acquisition. In the early 1830s, the superintendent of the company, Sir Edward Parry, established a private native constabulary to augment a small garrison of soldiers. The black constables, such as Jonathan and William, were involved in dispensing lethal summary justice to Aboriginal people accused of murdering a company employee, and were also permitted to shoot armed runaway convicts. Parry was later officially accused of putting a price on the heads of certain Aboriginal people, which he unequivocally denied. By 1841, the new superintendent P. P. King still employed black constables, but their duties may have been limited to dingo culling.

=== Goulburn ===
Also in the 1830s, Major Edmund Lockyer a magistrate in the Goulburn region, employed at least one Aboriginal constable, who captured murderers and gangs of armed bushrangers in the region.

== Port Phillip District and surrounds (later known as Victoria) ==
In the late 1830s, the NSW government found it was having trouble financing the NSW Mounted Police, a corps of mounted soldiers that, since 1825, had operated as the main enforcers of colonial rule in frontier areas. Officials looked at cheaper alternatives and came up with two solutions. One was the Border Police, which was a mounted force of armed convicts under the command of a commissioner, and the other was the trial of a force of armed and mounted Aboriginal police under the command of white officers.

By 1840, the Border Police became the main replacement for the NSW Mounted Police along the frontier, while the Native Police Corps, as the Aboriginal force was known, was limited initially to one division in the Port Phillip District of the colony, around Melbourne. Requests for the establishment of a Native Police Corps were made from as early as 1837 when Captain William Lonsdale proposed legislation for its formation.

=== Establishment ===
In October 1837, Christian Ludolph Johannes de Villiers was appointed to command the first official Native Police troopers from their station at Nerre Nerre Warren, in spite of warnings against the use of native police from the House of Commons Select Committee on Aborigines, based on the argument that "uncivilized men" enlisted "in defence of order" would "become the victims of their own zeal". It was disbanded briefly in January 1838 but reorganised in April of the same year with its new headquarters in Jolimont, where the Melbourne Cricket Ground car park is now situated.

Due to funding problems, the force was again dissolved in 1839. The same problem delayed the reformation of the corps until 1842, when Superintendent Charles La Trobe indicated he was willing to underwrite the costs. A significant factor in the restoration of the force was the successful capture of five Aboriginal Tasmanians (one of whom was Truganini) near Westernport in 1840 by local Aboriginal men who were attached to a party of Border Police and soldiers.

Native Police of Port Phillip, 1850

Henry Dana was selected to command the corps in 1842. Except for a brief period during which the corps was based at Merri Creek, the headquarters was at the Aboriginal Protectorate Station at Nerre Nerre Warren, near to present day Dandenong, about 25 kilometres (16 mi) south-east of Melbourne. The force initially made use of around twenty Aboriginal men as troopers mostly from the Woiwurrung and Bunurong tribes, directed by several white officers with Dana as commandant. The force had two goals: to protect the colonists from Aboriginal resistance, and to assimilate the Indigenous troopers into the military aspect of European society. Both La Trobe and William Thomas, Protector of Aborigines, expected that the men would give up their traditional way of life when exposed to the discipline of militia work. To their disappointment, troopers continued to participate in corroborees and ritual fighting, although not in uniform.

As senior Wurundjeri elder or ngurungaeta of the Woiwurrung people, Billibellary's cooperation in the proposal was important for its success and, after deliberation, he backed the initiative and even proposed himself for enlistment. He donned the uniform and enjoyed the status of parading through the camp, but was careful to avoid active duty as a trooper which involved having to leave his home country. After about a year, Billibellary resigned from the Native Police Corps when he found that it was to be used to capture and kill other Aborigines. From then on, he did his best to undermine the corps and, as a result, many native troopers deserted and few remained longer than three or four years.

The troopers were provided with uniforms, firearms, food rations, and a small cash salary. In the colonial society that was hostile and oppressive to the Indigenous population, joining the Native Police was one of the very few ways that Aboriginal men could achieve some degree of respect and survival.

=== Duties ===
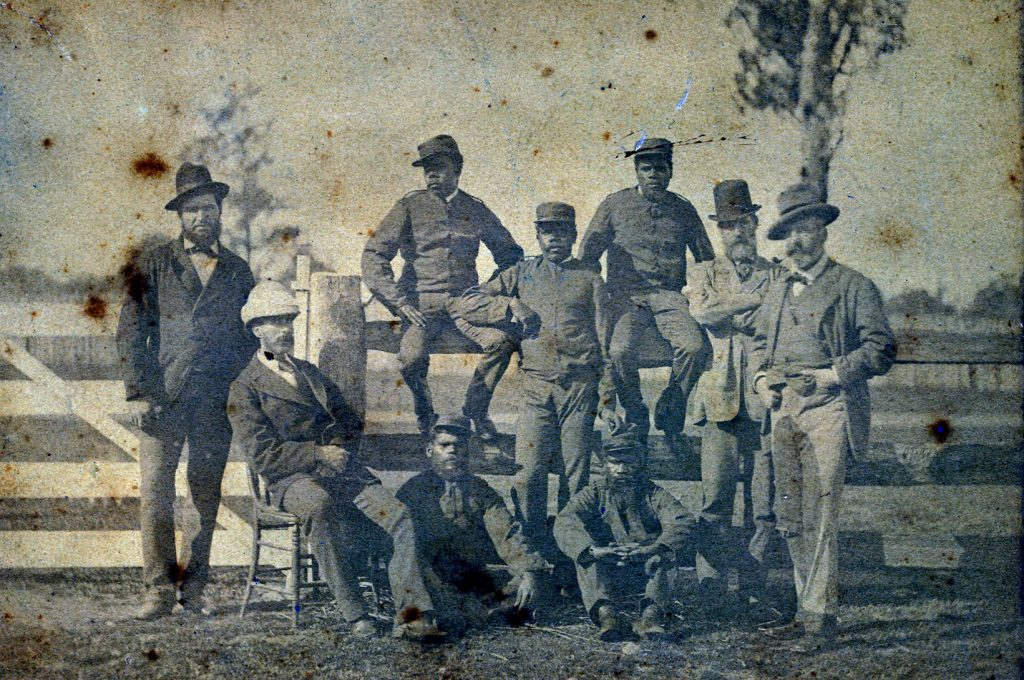
A contingent of police trackers from Queensland and with police officers from Victoria, including Commissioner Frederick Standish, in Benalla, in their search for Ned Kelly and gang, 1879

The Native Police Corps of Port Phillip District has in the past been framed as being established to uphold the early colonial public peace and capture Aboriginal criminals. However, as La Trobe himself stated, the primary purpose of the force was to quash aggressively any Indigenous resistance to British colonisation and to remove the need for the settlers themselves undertake armed "vindictive reprisals" against the "natives".

The Native Police were deployed to areas around the Port Phillip region where Aboriginal resistance to European colonisation could not be suppressed by armed settlers. Once in those areas, the troopers and their officers were often placed under the command of the local Commissioner for Crown Lands, who would then seek out and capture or destroy the dissident Indigenous groups and individuals. In addition to Native Police, the Commissioner had the support of troopers of the Border Police and NSW Mounted Police, as well as armed volunteer settlers, to conduct punitive raids on Aboriginal people.

The three main areas of activity for the corps were the Western and Portland Bay districts, the Murray River, and Gippsland. Detachments of the Native Police were deployed to those areas until 1850. As most of the troopers were from the clans around Melbourne, they generally viewed the Indigenous people of these regional districts as mainmeet or foreign adversaries and, with the encouragement of their officers, considered them as justifiable targets for hostile actions. When not on active duty, the troopers were mostly garrisoned at the Narre Narre Warren barracks. Winter was often chosen as the period of active duty, particularly in the Western districts, because the Aboriginal people they targeted were more sedentary in the colder periods and therefore much easier to find.

=== Frontier clashes ===
==== Portland Bay-Western District ====
Native police were called upon to take part in operations in the Victorian Western District in 1843. Operations in that year included attacks upon the Gunditjmara and Jardwadjali at the Crawford River, Mount Eckersley, Victoria Range and at Mount Zero. Upon their return to Melbourne, one of the troopers described an incident to the assistant Aboriginal Protector, William Thomas, in which 17 Aboriginal men had been killed by the corps, who stated that:

one black related to me how many had been killed...the gross number of 17...that he saw a black's guts shot out...those the police caught they tied to a tree and flogged.

Newspaper reports of this incident estimated that around 20 "savages" were shot and that the local settlers were in "perfect ecstasies" over these killings by the Native Police.

In addition to hostile actions, the Native Police were also able to recruit two new troopers from the Port Fairy area in 1845.

Although 1843 appears to be the year in which the largest number of casualties were inflicted the corps in that region, operations in other years up to 1847 resulted in further multiple fatalities, particularly at Lake Learmonth, the Eumeralla area, and at Captain Firebrace's Mount Vectis property.

In 1844, the Native Police based at Portland Bay were ordered to conduct operations across the border at Mount Gambier in South Australia. South Australian police in the region were investigating the rape of an Aboriginal boy called Syntax by a settler named Robertson. The officer involved found that the boy was shot dead by the Native Police.

==== Murray Region ====
The Native Police deployed to the Murray region operated over a large area, that included forays across the Murray into the Tumut region right down to the Wimmera. They worked under their own officers such as Henry Dana, his brother William, and his brother-in-law W.H. Walsh, while also coming under the authority of various Commissioners of Crown Lands such as Henry Smythe and Frederick Powlett.

In 1843 and 1844, Commissioner Smythe and Henry Dana led a series of punitive expeditions with forces including Native Police, around the Moira Lakes area of the Murray, down Mitta Mitta River and along the Edward River. In one of the resultant skirmishes, Dana was wounded in the leg with a spear. Significant numbers of local Aboriginal men, women and children were reported as being killed or wounded.

Other skirmishes occurred near Tongala and Lake Learmonth. Further down the Murray, punitive operations were conducted near McLeod's station in 1846, Bael Bael also in 1846, and around Swan Hill in 1850. Swan Hill and Echuca (Maidan's Punt) became bases for Native Police operations.

Occasionally, Native Police troopers were killed during duty. When a Wemba-Wemba man killed a trooper near Swan Hill, revenge was taken upon him by other troopers who pursued him, shot him in the head and cut his corpse to pieces.

==== Gippsland ====
Native Police operations in Gippsland began in 1843 with the appointment of Charles Tyers as Commissioner of Crown Lands in the region. Tyers had command of a permanent force of Border Police based at Eagle Point, augmented with a seasonal deployment of Native Police based at Boisdale. The closeness of the Border Police and the Native Police is demonstrated by Sergeant Windridge, who was employed in both forces in Gippsland. In 1845 and 1846, Tyers led his forces on extensive punitive raids around Lake Wellington, up the Avon River and down to the Gippsland Lakes region.

In late 1846 and early 1847, a rumour began that a shipwrecked white woman had been abducted by a clan of the Gunai people. Outraged sensibility among the colonists demanded both the rescue of the supposed damsel and the wholesale punishment of the natives involved. A special Native Police mission was organised in September 1846, led by Henry Dana, which failed to locate the white woman. A private posse of ten armed Aboriginal men and six whites was then organised under Christian de Villiers, which was also unsuccessful. Eventually, the rumour about the white woman proved to be false, but the result for the Gunai was devastating. Tyers estimated that the two punitive groups killed at least 50 Aboriginal people and wounded many more.

At the same time, more regular combined Native and Border Police operations resulted in mass killings of Gunai around Boisdale and on the MacAllister River. In late 1846, there was a large punitive operation at the mouth of the Snowy River, during which the forces were split into three groups to surround and engage Aboriginal people residing in the estuary area. The Native Police Corps then continued upstream along the river. Aboriginal Protector, William Thomas described how the troopers killed one man, two women and six children, returning with the severed hands of the defeated as trophies.

=== Disbandment of the Port Phillip Native Police ===
From 1850, with the devastating decline in the regional Aboriginal population resultant from conflict, dispossession and introduced disease, the duties of the troopers shifted toward patrolling the new gold finds around Ballarat and also guarding the Pentridge Prison. The Corps also undertook searches for lost settlers and acted as an armed escort for travellers and dignitaries.

However, by this stage many troopers themselves had died from disease and violence. In 1851, a dispute over a woman resulted in Native Police officer W.H. Walsh shooting and wounding fellow officer William Dana. Walsh was sentenced to 7 years transportation to Van Diemen's Land. Finally, in late 1852, the death of the commandant, Henry Dana, led to the official disbandment of the Port Phillip Native Police Corps in January 1853.

== Western Australia ==
In the late 1830s, Western Australia was in a similar situation to the eastern colonies, in that the regular Mounted Police force was proving expensive and increasingly ineffectual in subduing the resistance of Aboriginal people. In 1840, this culminated in the murders of a white woman and her child in York. John Nicol Drummond, a young man who had grown up amongst Aboriginal people in the areas of the Swan and Helena Valleys, was able to capture the perpetrator due to his knowledge of the local tribes-people. As a result, in August 1840 Drummond was rewarded with the title of Inspector in the newly formed Native Police.

The Western Australian Native Police force was smaller than those of other colonies in that usually only two or three mounted Aboriginal constables were under the command of attached a white officer. It was also different in that the Aboriginal officers were given monetary rewards for capturing wanted people and that they were placed under the control of the Native Protector. However, extrajudicial killings of Aboriginal people by the police still occurred during the 1840s. The force also became less formalised in its command structure, to the point where, in 1854, Drummond concurrently held the positions of Native Protector, magistrate, and Superintendent of Police in the Champion Bay area. That situation gave Drummond complete freedom to subdue Aborigines around Geraldton, by whatever method he deemed appropriate. The result was a massacre of Aboriginal people by the police and armed stockholders at Bootenal swamp near Greenough.

In 1865, Maitland Brown was sent on a search expedition through the La Grange and Roebuck Bay areas, following the murder of a number of gold prospectors by the local Aboriginal people. The search team seized two Aboriginal informers and, when they tried to escape, they were shot by the native police. As late as the 1920s, native constables, or trackers as they were called by then, aided white officers and stockmen in massacres of Aboriginal people, a notorious example being the Forrest River massacre.

== New South Wales and Queensland ==
Native Police (NSW and QLD division)
- Active: 1848 – c.1915
- Country: British Empire (New South Wales and Queensland colonies)
- Allegiance: British Empire
- Type: Mounted Infantry
- Nicknames: The Black Police; Queensland Mounted Native Police

Commanders
- Commandant: Frederick Walker (1848–1854)
- Commandant: Richard Purvis Marshall (1854–1855)
- Inspector General of Police: William Colburn Mayne (1855–1856)
- Inspector General of Police: John McLerie (1856)
- Government Resident: John Clements Wickham (1856–1857)
- Commandant: Edric Norfolk Vaux Morisset (1857–1861)
- Commandant: John O'Connell Bligh (1861–1864)
- Queensland Police Commissioner: David Thompson Seymour (1864–1895)
- Queensland Police Commissioner: William Edward Parry-Okeden (1895–1905)

From 1839, the main frontier policing force in New South Wales was divisions of mounted convict soldiers known as the Border Police. However, in the late 1840s, with the end of convict transportation looming, a new source of cheap and effective troopers was required to subdue Aboriginal resistance along the ever-extending frontier. The need was especially apparent in the north, where conflict between squatters and Aboriginal people in the Darling Downs area was slowing pastoral expansion.

As a result, the NSW government passed legislation in 1848 to fund a new section of Native Police based on the Port Phillip model. Frederick Walker, a station manager and court official residing in the Murrumbidgee area, was appointed as the first Commandant of the Native Police force. Walker recruited 14 native troopers from four different language groups in the Murrumbidgee, Murray, and Edwards Rivers areas. The first troopers were Jack, Henry (both Wiradjuri), Geegwaw, Jacky Jacky, Wygatta, Edward, Logan (all Wemba Wemba), Alladin, Paddy, Larry, Willy, Walter, Tommy Hindmarsh (all Barababaraba), and Yorky (Yorta Yorta). Logan and Jack who were both previously employed in the Border Police, were given the rank of corporal.

Although most of the operations of the force over the following 60 years occurred in what is now Queensland, Native Police were stationed in various parts of New South Wales, and patrolling continued there until at least 1868. The areas included Kempsey/Macleay River, Grafton/Ballina (Clarence River), Murrumbidgee, Lower Darling/Albert and Upper Darling/Paroo regions.

=== Initial deployment ===
The force was consolidated and trained by Walker at Deniliquin before travelling to the Darling River, where the first attack on Aborigines occurred 100 miles (160 km) below Fort Bourke, at a place called Moanna, resulting in at least five natives being killed by the troopers. In 1849, Walker mobilised his force north beyond the MacIntyre River to police the out-stations. Arriving at the Macintyre River on 10 May 1849, the force checked the aggressions of the local Aboriginal people and, when trying to capture six Aboriginal men charged with murder, there were "some lives lost".

The force was then deployed to the Condamine River, where the "Fitzroy Downs blacks" were routed, and another group were "compelled to fly" from the area. One of the skirmishes was described as a dawn raid on an Aboriginal encampment, during which around 100 native people were killed and two Native Police troopers were fatally injured.

Walker found most of the squatters in the region thought the Native Police existed to shoot down the natives so they would not have to it themselves. Walker advocated a method of "bringing in" the Aboriginal people, allowing them onto pastoral stations where they could obtain a lawful means of a livelihood. Those who stayed away were consequently regarded as potential enemies and risked being targeted in punitive missions. Walker's measure of success was the resulting increase in land values. The actions of the Native Police greatly reduced Aboriginal resistance to squatters in the Macintyre and Condamine regions.

=== Expansion to Maranoa, Burnett, Dawson and Wide Bay areas ===
Walker returned to Deniliquin in July 1850 to recruit 30 new troopers, in order to enable an expansion into the Wide Bay–Burnett region. With those fresh reinforcements, he created four divisions of Native Police, one based at the Callandoon station of Augustus Morris, one at Wide Bay–Burnett, one in the Maranoa Region, and one roving division. While Walker was away, Richard Purvis Marshall, the squatter at Goondiwindi station, assumed command of Native Police operations. Marshall, with the native troopers and contingents of armed stockmen, conducted punitive raids at Tieryboo, Wallan, Booranga and Copranoranbilla Lagoon, shooting Aboriginal people and destroying their camps. That resulted in an inquiry by the local Crown Lands Commissioner and a vaguely worded official reminder from the NSW Attorney General to only shoot in "extreme cases".

In 1851, Commandant Walker, with his newly appointed officers Richard Purvis Marshall, George Fulford, Doolan and Skelton, conducted wide-ranging and frequent operations, resulting in many dispersals and summary killings. Dispersals of large numbers of Aborigines occurred at Dalgangal, Mary River, Toomcul, and Goondiwindi, and at various places along the Maranoa River. In his the end-of-year report in 1851, Governor Fitzroy noted that a great many blacks were killed, but no official action was taken to modify the aggression of the Native Police.

=== Fraser Island (K'gari) ===
On 18 February 1851, a meeting of magistrates was held at the newly established town of Maryborough. Three Native Police officers, Commissioner Bidwill, and squatter Edmund B. Uhr were present, issuing warrants against a number of Aboriginal men accused of murder and felony. Nearby Fraser Island (now called K'gari)was being used as a sanctuary for the Badtjala people. It was not until late December 1851 that the force was ready to search Fraser Island. Walker, Marshall, Doolan, and their three divisions of troopers, together with local landholders, the Leith Hay brothers and Mr Wilmot, set out down the Mary River aboard Captain Currie's schooner Margaret and Mary. Aboriginal people in a stolen dinghy were shot at along the way and the boat seized.

The force landed on the west coast of the island where the divisions split up to scour the region. During the night a group of Aboriginal men attempted to surprise Marshall's section resulting in two Aboriginal men being shot. Bad weather hampered operations and Commandant Walker subsequently allowed his division to track down other groups of Badtjala without him. That group followed the Aboriginal people across to the east coast where they "took to the sea". The force returned to Maryborough in early January 1852 and Captain Currie received a reward of £10 for his contribution.

=== Consolidation of the Native Police ===
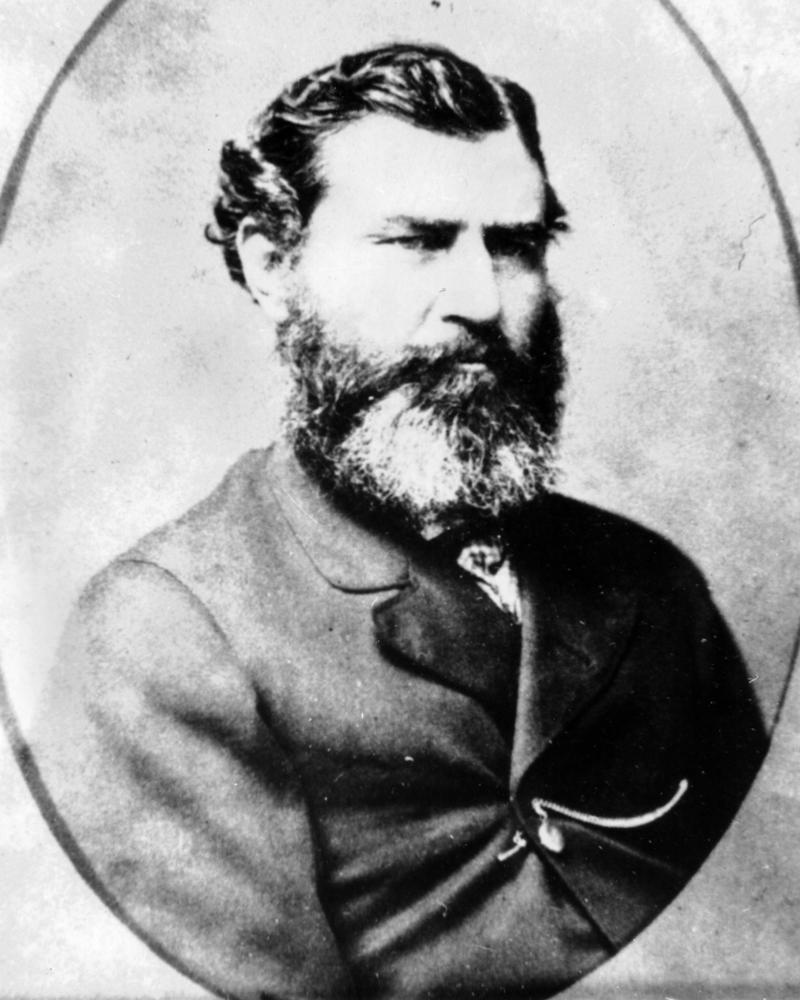
John Murray

The year 1852 saw further recruitment and the Native Police was expanded to eight divisions. Forty-eight new troopers were signed up, mostly from the northern inland rivers area of NSW. Lieutenant John Murray was appointed to the 4th Division, Lieutenant Blandford to the 3rd Division, and Sergeants Skelton, Pincolt and Richard A. Dempster were appointed as officers in charge of other divisions. The Traylan barracks on the Burnett River was established, near the now-abandoned site of Ceratodus, and north of present-day Eidsvold, while the other major barracks, besides Callandoon, was at Wondai Gumbal near Yuleba.

Sergeant Dempster was responsible for several large scale dispersals in 1852. The first was at Wallumbilla where an ex-trooper named Priam and a number of others were shot dead. Dempster then travelled to Ogilvie's Wachoo station near St. George and shot a large number of Aboriginal people with the aid of a man named Johnson, who was the superintendent of the property. During the dispersal, Johnson killed a white storeperson in a "friendly fire" incident. Dempster, having fallen sick, then allowed Johnson to take charge of his division and lead it to Yamboukal (modern-day Surat), where a lot of Mandandanji people, working peacefully on a pastoral station, were subsequently killed. As a result, Dempster was suspended for three months. It appears that neither Johnson nor Dempster faced any legal repercussions.

Sergeant Skelton also led a number of dispersal raids across the Dawson River area and down to Ukabulla (also near Surat), during which Mandandanji leader Bussamarai was killed. Battles also occurred between John Murray's troopers and the Kabi Kabi at Widgee, and with Walker's forces and the Bigambul south of Callandoon. Native Police were also employed tracking down Chinese coolie labourers who had run away from the stations of powerful squatters such as Gordon Sandeman.

=== Deployment to Port Curtis ===
In 1853, several new sub-lieutenants were appointed, including John O'Connell Bligh, Edric Norfolk Vaux Morisset, Frederick Keen, Samuel Crummer, Francis Nicoll, and Frederick Walker's brother, Robert G. Walker. The Sydney Morning Herald described the operations of Lieutenants Marshall and John Murray along the Burnett River as "taking and shooting hosts of murderers, never stopping, never tiring".

New barracks were built at Rannes, Walla and at Swanson's Yabba station at the top of Yabba Falls. Squatters Holt and Hay pursued an overland path to the taking up of lands toward Port Curtis. Two men accompanying them were killed by Aboriginal people and, as a consequence, the 1st Division of Native Police, under Commandant Walker, was sent into the area. Additionally, Lieutenant John Murray and the 3rd Division, with the troopers of Sergeant Doolan were deployed by ship to Gladstone to ensure a strong garrison at the fledgling settlement there. The surveyor sent to mark out Gladstone, Francis MacCabe, felt so unsafe that he established the camp in an area close to the coast, two miles away from any freshwater.

=== Murrumbidgee ===
As Walker's force originated in this area, native troopers from outside this region were utilised to punish Aboriginal resistance in the Murrumbidgee. For instance, in 1852, after the murder of an American worker at Deniliquin, Sergeant O'Halloran from Moulamein imported both native and White troopers from Victoria to shoot Aboriginal people as a collective punishment. His force drove a camp of people, most of them older women and children, across the Edward River, fatally wounding 2 women and a child.

By 1853, 12 troopers of Native Police were officially stationed in the Murrumbidgee District under the command of the local Commissioner for Crown Lands. The need for native troopers in this region was soon deemed superfluous and the government dissolved this detachment in 1857. However, the Murrumbidgee was still utilised as a recruitment area for troopers to fight in Queensland with Lieut. John Murray returning to the area as late as 1865 to enlist local Aboriginal men. In 1864, Murray visited the region bringing with him the remaining four living troopers from Walker's first recruitment in 1848. After 15 years service, one of them was lucky enough to be reunited with his father in Echuca.

=== Grafton/Ballina ===
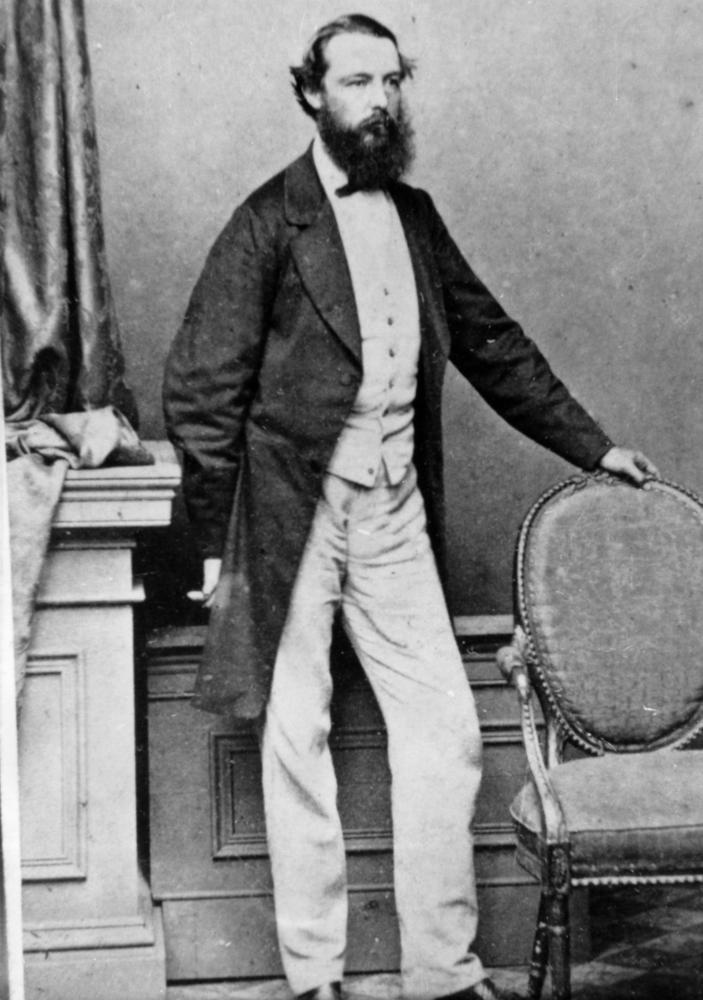
Edric Norfolk Vaux Morisset

In 1853, Walker reluctantly deployed the 5th Section of the Native Police under 2nd Lieutenant Edric Norfolk Vaux Morisset to the Clarence River region. He thought this was a "retrograde step" because he viewed the Aboriginal problem is that area as minor. But under pressure from powerful squatters in the area like William Forster he relented, even though the section did not have enough horses.

Morisset and his 12 troopers were stationed on the Orara River at Braunstone 10 miles (16 km) south of Grafton. Morisset was given warrants for the arrest of some Aboriginal people who worked as shearers at Newton Boyd. After arriving in the area on a borrowed horse, he wanted to capture them while they were working in the wool shed. When they saw they police they ran, with two being shot and three captured. That resulted in a government inquiry.

The other significant punitive raid occurred in East Ballina, where the troopers conducted an early morning raid on Aboriginal people sleeping on the slopes near Black Head. That resulted in at least 30 or 40 deaths and many wounded. Complaints were made to the government about the massacre but no action was taken. Edric Morisset later became Commandant of the Native Police based in Brisbane and was replaced on the Clarence by 2nd Lieutenant John O'Connell Bligh. A few years later, when a Clarence River squatter was asked if he thought any Aboriginal criminals were still at large, he simply replied "No, I think they are dead."

The Native Police were officially withdrawn from the area in 1859. Sub-Inspector Galbraith was dismissed in 1863 for the accidental shooting death of a native girl while out "routing the blacks" near Grafton.

=== Kempsey/Macleay River ===
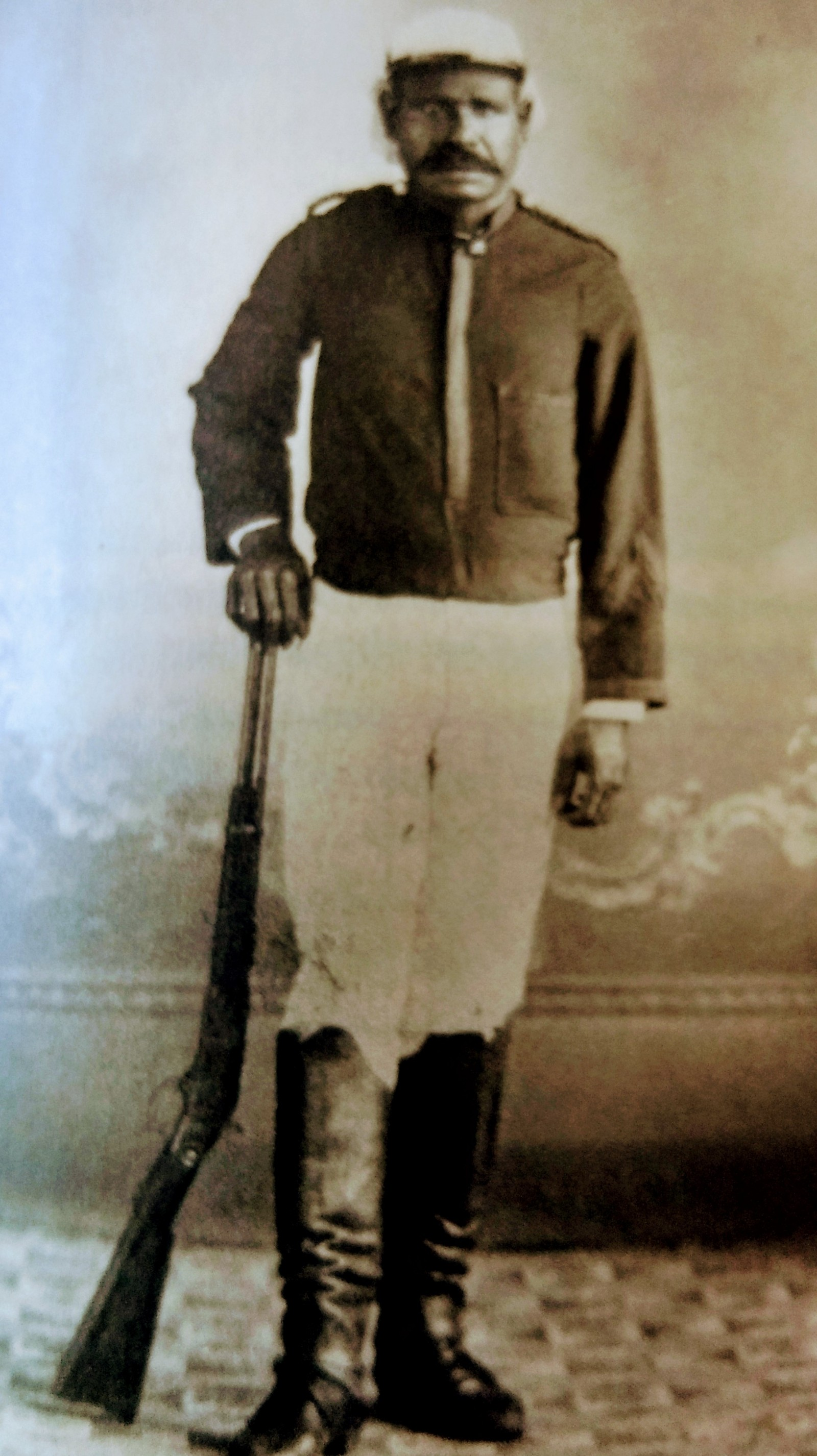
Native Police trooper

In 1854, Sub Lieutenant Dempster, who was initially stationed as a sergeant at Grafton with Morisset, was ordered to travel to the Macleay River with six troopers and set up a Native Police station near Kempsey. Squatters in the area had recently placed official requests for a section to be garrisoned on the Macleay. The Native Police camp was located at the old Border Police barracks at Belgrave Flat near Belgrave Falls just west of Kempsey.

In 1859, 2nd Lieutenant Richard Bedford Poulden (sometimes written as Poulding) was deployed to Belgrave Flat with his troopers from the Upper Dawson area in Queensland. Poulden was previously an Ensign in 56th Foot who fought in the Crimean War, and was the great-grandson of the Earl of Devon. In addition to performing patrolling duties, he also came for the purpose of recruiting more troopers. In 1859 he conducted a raid on Aboriginal people living at Christmas Creek near Frederickton. He captured a Dunghutti man called Doughboy who had murdered a sawyer named Dan Page.

In 1860, Poulden was called out again to capture Aboriginal criminals who had laid siege to Mrs McMaugh at Nulla Nulla Creek. Poulden and his six troopers tracked them up Five Day Creek to the ranges, where several were killed after a gunfight. An orphaned child was taken after the skirmish and delivered to local Towal Creek squatter John Warne to look after. The native police involved in such raids used to strip naked and wear red headbands to distinguish them from the "wild blacks", to try to ensure that they did not shoot each other by mistake.

Not long after that, at the request of prominent station manager John Vaughan McMaugh, the Belgrave Flat Native Police barracks was moved to Nulla Nulla station near Bellbrook. After some cedar cutters were hacked to death and others had their skulls smashed in during an ambush, stockmen and native police troopers went out after the murderers. Again another battle ensued and in the end there were a great number of dead and wounded Dunghutti. The creek where this occurred was named Waterloo Creek (halfway between Dyke River and Georges Creek) as a result of the carnage. Four prisoners were taken.

In 1863, Senior Constable Nugent took control of the Native Police at Nulla Nulla. In September 1864, he and his troopers were involved in a mission that ranged from Georges Creek, Lagoon Creek and then up Five Day Creek to Moy Buck Mountain. When the Aboriginal camp was discovered the Aboriginal fled in all directions. Later in 1864, there is a record of the murderer named Blue Shirt being captured and handcuffed to the stirrup of a horse belonging to a Native Police trooper. The horse subsequently become frightened and kicked him to death. Names of some of the troopers posted to the Macleay region include Carlo, Quilt, Paddy and Dundally.

Nulla Nulla barracks appears to have closed in 1865 when Henry Sauer bought the property and turned it into a dairy farm. In 1885, 36.4 hectares of the property was gazetted as an Aboriginal Reserve. In 1902 the skeletons of a woman and child with shot holes in their skulls were found on Taylors Arm Mountain in the Macleay region. It was reported as a double murder mystery. Local Aboriginal Left-Handed Billy solved the case by stating that there was a Native Police camp at Nulla Nulla and these two people were some of its victims. Billy offered to take the authorities and show them the other places where people were shot.

=== Lower Darling and Albert Districts ===
During the period in question, the Lower Darling district extended from near the confluence of the Murrumbidgee with the Murray, up to the Darling and north to near the confluence of the Warrego. The Albert region was the area west of the Darling River. (By the late 1870s this had changed significantly). In late 1853, Stephen Cole, the Commissioner for Crown Lands for the Lower Darling district had organised six troopers for his Native Police based in Euston. This force was involved in arresting European sly-grog sellers. At the same time, Commissioner for Crown Lands for the Albert District, G. M. Perry, had organised another six Native Police troopers based at Moorana, an administrative town that used to exist just west of Wentworth.

By the late 1850s, the jurisdiction of the native troopers had been transferred from the Crown Lands department to the Native Police proper, with E. M. Lockyer and A. T. Perry being appointed 2nd Lieutenants for the Lower Darling and Albert districts respectively. Perry and his troopers, while investigating the death of a White man at Baker's station, threatened and watched four Aboriginal people residing on the property into making confessions. While they were being escorted to prison, they escaped, and after refusing to surrender, one was shot dead. The other three managed to escape but were found at Euston where two more were shot dead. Their hands were cut off and presented as proof of their demise. Perry also dispersed a large congregation of Aboriginal people assembled at the Murray-Darling junction. When investigating another murder of a white man near Menindie, Perry had the ring leader tied to a tree and shot dead as a method of "keeping the blacks quiet". It appears that the Native Police units had been dissolved in the Lower Darling and Albert Districts by the early 1860s.

=== Upper Darling and Paroo ===
Lieutenant Perry occasionally sent several native troopers into the Upper Darling areas to accompany official expeditions into the area. A police station was established at Tintinalogy between Menindee and Wilcannia.

As late as 1868, Native Police based at Thargomindah in Queensland conducted patrols down the Paroo River as far as Fort Bourke in New South Wales. Sub-Inspector W. R. O. Hill described one of these patrols. Hill saw one of Aboriginal troopers named Vick carrying a four-year-old son of an aboriginal man who "had been deservedly shot". The boy spat in the eye of the trooper who then killed the boy by smashing his head into a tree. Although Hill flogged the trooper as punishment, as Hill stated, it showed "the savage instinct will come out in the aboriginal."

=== Dismissal of Frederick Walker ===
The size of the Native Police expanded further in 1854 to 10 Divisions. Commandant Walker was suspended from duty in September and the inquiry, to be held in Brisbane, was set for December. The inquiry was closed to the public and the report was kept secret for two years. Even then, only fragments of information were released. It revealed that Walker arrived at the inquiry completely drunk and surrounded by nine of his black troopers. The troopers were denied entry, and after an attempt to continue with proceedings, the inebriation of Walker forced an adjournment to the inquiry which was later quickly and conveniently abandoned altogether. An attempt by 2nd Lieut. Irving to confront Walker, resulted in the ex-Commandant drawing a sword against him. Eventually, Walker wandered off and was subsequently dismissed from the Native Police. He was later apprehended at Bromelton, charged with the embezzlement of £100 and sent to Sydney.

=== Period of decline and expansion to the Fitzroy River area ===
After the dismissal of Frederick Walker, the force entered a period of poor funding and uncertainty. Many troopers either deserted or were discharged. Richard Purvis Marshall was promoted to Commandant but was soon discharged from the position after complaining of the trooper reductions. With the force in a weakened state, aboriginal resistance became more bold. In September 1855, in retaliation against two previous dispersals and for the stealing of women, Gangulu warriors attacked the Native Police barracks at Rannes, killing three troopers of R. G. Walker's division. Mt. Larcom station was also attacked around this time, resulting in the deaths of five station-hands. Multiple punitive missions were conducted by John Murray and R. G. Walker's sections after these attacks, including one which went north of the Fitzroy River. Charles Archer of Gracemere provided assistance with this dispersal by attaching his own private native troopers to the corps. This augmented party killed 14 Aboriginal people. In revenge, these Aboriginal people then attacked Elliot's new pastoral run at Nine Mile on the Fitzroy River, killing one person and wounding three including Elliot.

Charles Archer had arrived in Gracemere in August 1855 with an escort of 35 people including four Native Police troopers and four "Burnett boys". Once arrived, he obtained the protective services of a local Fitzroy River clan led by "King Harold" which Archer utilised to "restrain the outside blacks". In July 1856, Richard E. Palmer travelled to the Fitzroy River from Gladstone, escorted by sub-Lieutenant W. D. T. Powell and his troopers, to set up the first store at Rockhampton. Powell went first to this area and constructed a Native Police barracks. This was the first habitable dwelling erected by European colonists in Rockhampton. It was on the south side of the river at the end of Albert Street.

With increased attacks around that time, and reports of discharged troopers conducting armed robberies around the region, squatters began to call for an immediate re-strengthening of the Native Police. A select committee inquiry into improving the Native Police was set up and, in late 1856, the control of the Native Police was transferred from the Inspector General of Police in Sydney to John Clements Wickham, who was the Government Resident in Brisbane. New officers were appointed, such as Moorhead, Thomas Ross, Walter David Taylor Powell, Francis Allman, Evan Williams, Frederick Carr and Charles Phibbs. In May 1857, the vacant position of Commandant was filled by E. N. V. Morisset and the headquarters of the Native Police was shifted from Traylan to Cooper's Plains, just west of Maryborough. However, even with that reorganisation, strong indigenous resistance continued.

=== Attacks at Miriam Vale, Eurombah and Hornet Bank ===
After an aboriginal ambush at Miriam Vale near Gladstone, it was determined that Curtis Island, like Fraser Island previously, was a safe haven for natives that needed to be breached. 2nd Lieutenant R. G. Walker organised a seaborne punitive expedition that included several troopers, 2nd Lieutenant W. D. T. Powell, and local squatters J. Landsborough and Ranken. The mission was a failure and, despite shooting two Aboriginal people in a canoe, Curtis Island was deemed dangerously populated.

On the Dawson River at Eurombah station 2nd Lieutenant Ross, with local squatter Boulton, carried out several punitive missions, killing at least 10 Aboriginal people. Trooper desertions continued to be a problem in the area and the containment of aboriginal resistance was problematic. A large attack on Eurombah station resulted in the deaths of six station workers. Officers Ross, Powell and E. N. V. Morisset led subsequent deadly punitive raids. Ross was suspended, due to neglect of duty for allowing the Eurombah attack to occur.

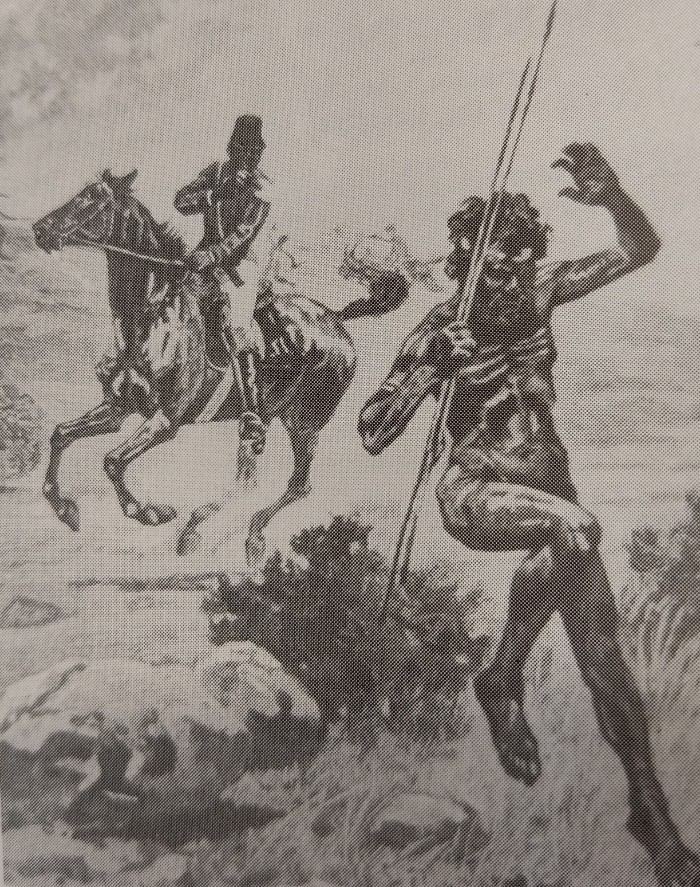
Native Police dispersal

Not long after, on 27 October 1857, a combined Aboriginal offensive on neighbouring Hornet Bank station resulted in the death of eleven settlers. This was, at the time, the largest loss of life suffering by European settlers in conflicts on the Australian frontier and with the concurrent Indian Rebellion being brutally suppressed, the military response was merciless. Officer W. D. T. Powell was the first Native Police officer to arrive and immediately tracked down and killed at least eight Aboriginal people. Multiple punitive missions conducted in the subsequent months under Powell, Carr and Moorhead killed at least 70 Aboriginal people. These shootings were blatantly indiscriminate with W. D. T. Powell reporting shooting down three unarmed Aboriginal women while they were running away.

In addition to the official government Native Police response, there were at least three other private militias formed in the Dawson River area to conduct wholesale killings of Aboriginal people. The first was the private native police formed by ex-commandant Frederick Walker. This group consisted of ten ex-Native Police troopers which conducted missions as far south as Surat. The second was the so-called "Browne's" death squad that consisted of a posse of twelve local squatters which killed around 90 Aboriginal people. The last was the group associated with William Fraser, who had most of his family killed in the Hornet Bank massacre. This group killed around 40 Aboriginal people, some of which were buried beside a lagoon on Juandah creek.

=== After Hornet Bank ===
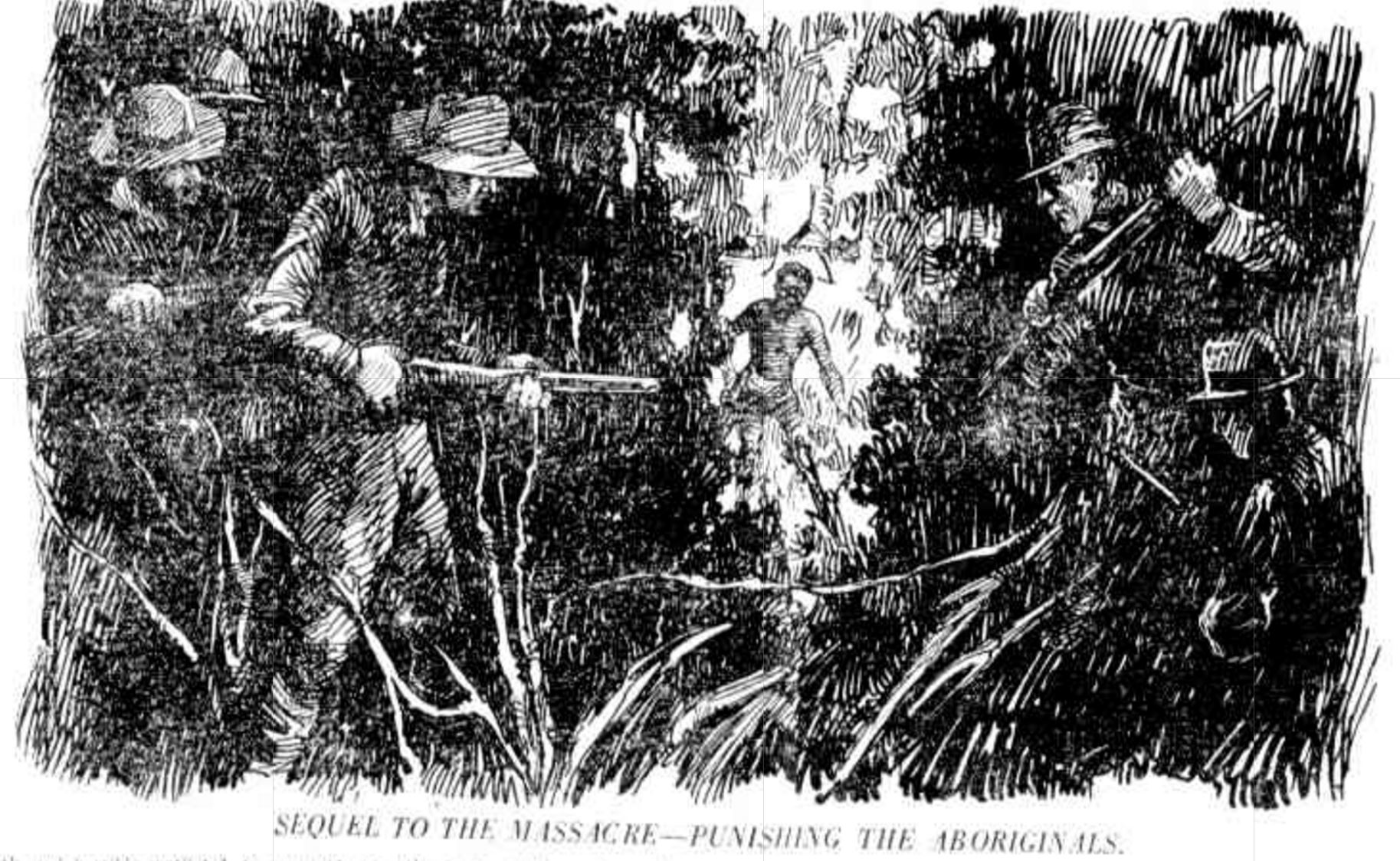

Another government inquiry in Sydney was ordered in July 1858 which concluded with the recommendation that "there is no alternative but to carry matters through with a strong hand and punish with necessary severity all future outrages". New officers were appointed including Frederick Wheeler and George Poultney Malcolm Murray and in August, Commandant Edric Morisset organised a large combined force of 17 troopers under Phibbs, Carr and G. P. M. Murray with a month's rations to scour the Upper Dawson area. The explorer A. C. Gregory accompanied this force and partook in their actions. Officers Bligh and Moorhead at the same time patrolled the stations adjoining the scrubs in the region. Gwambegwine and Kinnoul near Taroom became barracks for the Native Police. Ex-Commandant Walker wrote several letters to the Attorney General admonishing the murders of innocent Aboriginal people including that of Tommy Hippi, Tahiti and the massacre of Aboriginal people at a Juandah courthouse after they were found not guilty of crime.

=== Formation of the colony of Queensland ===
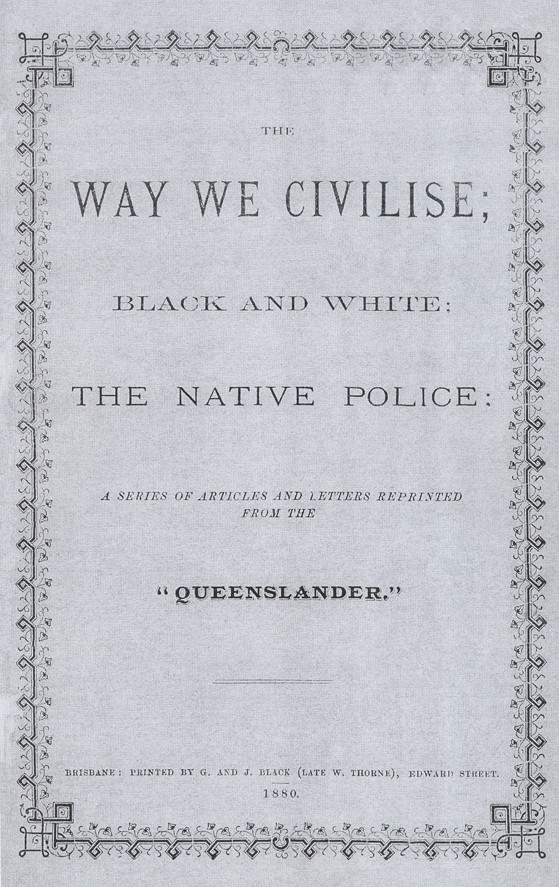
Front page of The Way We Civilise (1880), a pamphlet by Carl Feilberg criticising the use of Native Police in Queensland

The colony of Queensland separated from the colony of New South Wales, becoming a self-governing British colony in December 1859. E. N. V. Morisset, in addition to retaining his role as Commandant of the Native Police, also became the Inspector General of Police in the new colony. Under this new administration, the Native Police had even fewer checks and balances than it had previously. Morisset appointed new officers such as A. M. G. Patrick, A. F. Matveieff, J. T. Baker, as well as his own brother Rudolph S. Morisset.

The Native Police operated in Queensland was the longest-operating force of its kind in colonial Australian history and was, arguably, also the most controversial. Its mode of operation cannot by any standard be classified as "law enforcement". From the period 1859 onward to the 1890s, there are no signs that the force was engaged in anything but general punitive expeditions, commonly performed as deadly daybreak attacks on Aboriginal camps. All the indications are that the force generally took no prisoners at the frontier and, in the few cases on record when that did happen, the prisoners were on record as having been shot during attempts to escape.

Danish-born Australian journalist and Indigenous rights advocate Carl Feilberg wrote many articles and editorials in the Brisbane Courier and The Queenslander decrying the government's policies towards its Aboriginal inhabitants, in particular the use of Native Police. He ran a major campaign in the newspapers in 1880, culminating in December of that year with the publication of a pamphlet entitled The Way We Civilise: Black and White: The Native Police, which reprinted many of the pieces. Historian Henry Reynolds has played a big part in disseminating Feilberg's work in recent years.

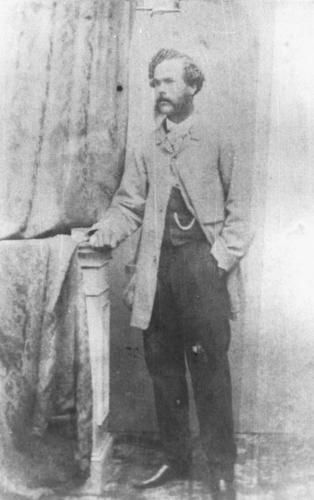
John O'Connell Bligh

In 1860, near Yuleba, a two-hour battle between Lieutenant Carr's Native Police and the "Dawson blacks" led by Baulie, resulted in Carr being wounded and Baulie and fifteen other Yiman being shot dead. A traveller at the time described how some Aboriginal "refugees" of the upper Dawson River conflicts had encamped at Euthulla. Their wailing for their dead kept him awake at night and many had gunshot wounds, some being crippled by their injuries.

In 1860, a number of settlers sent letters requesting Lieutenant Wheeler's aid in the Broadsound region, which was suffering from Aboriginal raids. On 24 December 1860, Lieutenant Wheeler and six of his Aboriginal troopers went to John Hardies' out-station at Fassifern and shot dead three Aboriginal males. The subsequent newspaper coverage pushed the Queensland Government into organising an inquiry into the Native Police.

In evidence given at the 1861 Select Committee report on the Native Police, Lieutenant Carr gave many other examples of shootings of Aboriginal people in the area. Likewise, in the still "unconquered" Pine Rivers region, just north of Brisbane, Lieutenant Williams' patrol was attacked by around 300 Ningi Ningi warriors. Many of the Aborigines were shot but, of the eight troopers with Williams, one was killed and two were seriously wounded.

Seven "station blacks" were shot dead at Couyar by Native Police, Lieut. Wheeler shot several innocent Aboriginal people at Dugandan, Lieut. John Murray conducted a massacre in the Wide Bay area and officers John O'Connell Bligh and Rudolph Morisset indiscriminately shot "station blacks" on properties around the Conondale Range.

In a separate incident, Bligh also chased and shot dead some Aboriginal people along the main street of Maryborough and into the river in broad daylight. Bligh was honoured with a special ceremony and a commemorative sword from the citizens of that town for his exploits.

=== The Cullin-la-ringo massacre and its aftermath ===
The violence of the early 1860s culminated in the Cullin-la-ringo massacre which occurred on 17 October 1861. Aboriginal people from the Nogoa River area, near modern-day Emerald, attacked Horatio Wills' newly formed pastoral station, resulting in the deaths of nineteen white settlers. One of the survivors, cricketer and Australian rules football founder Tom Wills, blamed the incident on Jesse Gregson, a local property manager who, previous to the attack, had conducted a punitive mission against Aboriginal people in the area, with the aid of a detachment of Native Police under the command of A. M. G. Patrick. In his own diaries, Gregson reveals that he accidentally shot Patrick in the leg during this preliminary dispersal. Gregson and other squatters were involved in the punitive raids after the massacre, with Lieutenant Cave being the first Native Police officer on the scene not long after. He was soon joined by officers G. P. M. Murray, Morehead, and the Commandant John O'Connell Bligh, and together they conducted a number of shooting patrols. The Queensland Governor estimated that up to 300 Aboriginal people were indiscriminately killed in those retaliatory operations.

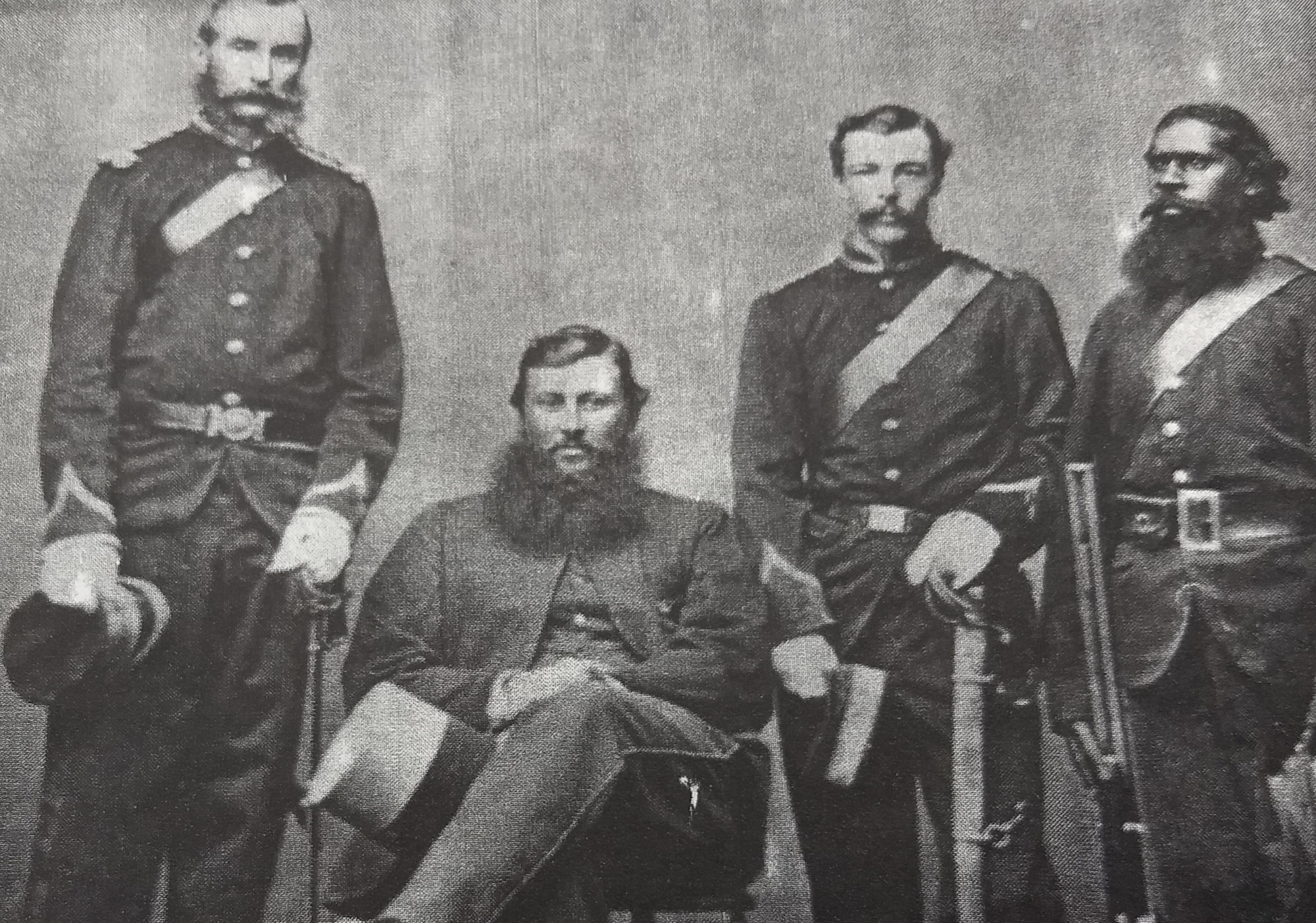
Inspectors John Marlow, G. P. M. Murray and Walter Compigne with Trooper Billy

Elsewhere in the colony, Lieutenant Wheeler and his detachment of Native Police killed eight innocent Aboriginal people at Caboolture. Lieutenant John Marlow and his Native police were attacked in the Maranoa Region, resulting in the deaths of thirteen Aboriginal males. In April 1861, George Elphinstone Dalrymple, the lands commissioner for the Leichhardt district, utilised two detachments of Native Police. Lieutenant Powell later conducting operations in that region. The Queensland government budget for the force in 1862 was £14,541 which allowed for 17 officers, 11 NCOs, 7 cadets and 134 troopers.

=== 1864 restructure of the police ===
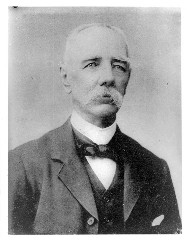
David Thompson Seymour

In 1864, all sections of police enforcement in Queensland underwent a major restructuring. Administration of the police, including that of the paramilitary Native Police, became centralised in Brisbane under the command of the Queensland Police Commissioner. The role of Commandant of the Native Police was abolished and the title of Lieutenant was replaced with Inspector. Although those changes to the Native Police appeared to give the force a more civilian role, in reality it remained an instrument of enforcing imperial control in the colony. The new Commissioner, David Thompson Seymour, took up the position after resigning from the role of commanding officer of the British Army detachment in Queensland. Seymour recognised the importance of the Native Police in the colonisation of Aboriginal lands, and was focused on improving and expanding its capabilities. Seymour remained command of the Native Police for thirty years, a period during which around 20,000 Aboriginal people were killed by the force.

The mid-1860s was a period of great expansion of European colonisation into the coastal and inland areas of north-eastern Australia. All those areas were inhabited by Indigenous communities and the restructured, re-enhanced Native Police had a major role in the elimination of Aboriginal custodianship of the land. For example, in April 1864, the first surveying group to assess the future site of Townsville left Bowen with the armed protection of eight troopers under the command of Inspector John Marlow and sub-Inspector E. B. Kennedy. The unit of Native Police conducted around four dispersals on the journey, resulting in the deaths of at least 24 Aboriginal men. An unknown number of women and children were killed but it is recorded that 15 females were abducted by the troopers and taken back to the Don River barracks as "wives".

Inspector Marlow, who had replaced Inspector Powell at Bowen in 1863, continued his work of "clearing the blacks" off the land after returning from this foundation expedition to Townsville. Earlier on in that year, Marlow had also provided a Native Police escort for the voyage of George Elphinstone Dalrymple to establish the town of Cardwell. Marlow's troopers here also "dispersed" and "rather cut up" some local Aboriginal people.

=== The killing of Inspector Cecil Hill and subsequent massacres ===
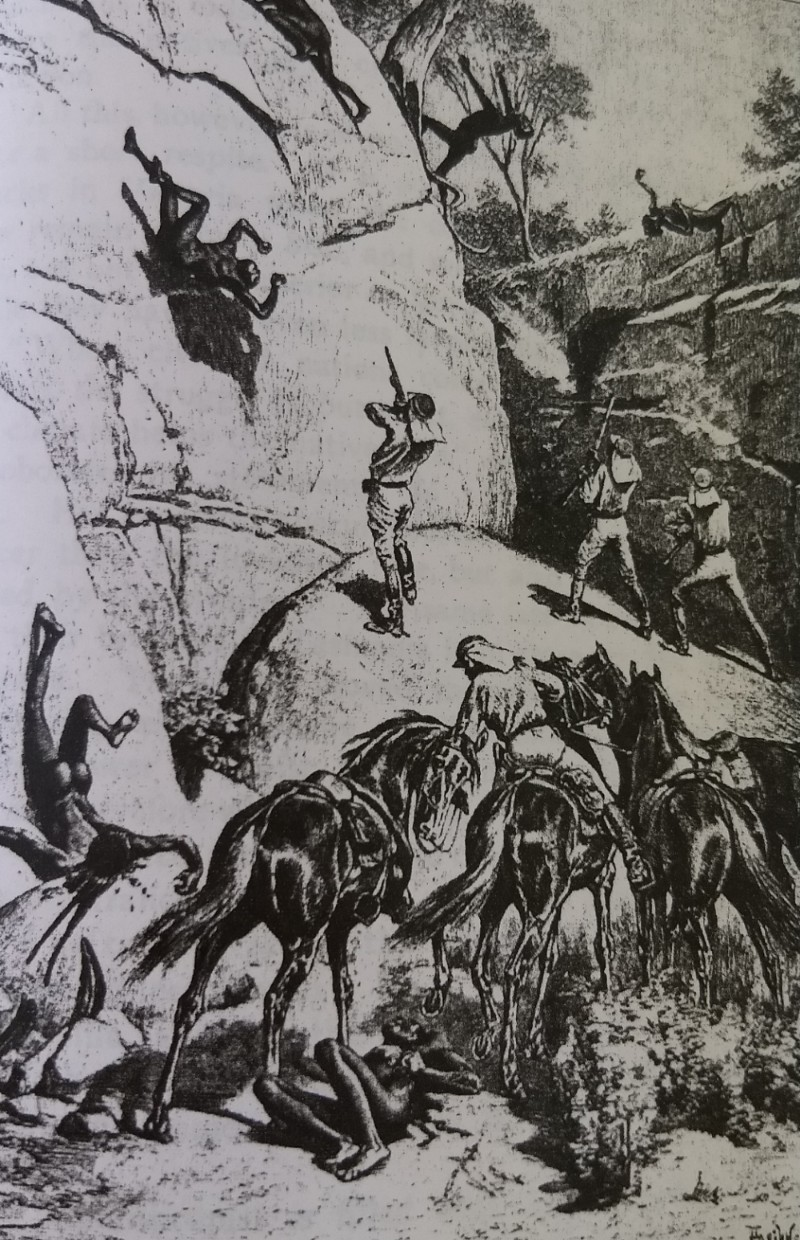
Dispersal of Aboriginal people

In May 1865, after leading a shooting raid on a camp of Aboriginal people at Pearl Creek, near the modern-day town of Duaringa, Inspector Cecil Hill was assassinated in a surprise revenge attack. Hill was the first Native Police officer in Australia to be killed in the Australian frontier wars. Chief Inspector George Murray sent sub-Inspector Oscar Pescher and his troopers to conduct a series of reprisal raids in the district. Pescher's detachment was later reinforced by officers Blakeney and Bailey and their 12 troopers. The combined forces effected a large massacre in the Expedition Range.

In December 1864, an Aboriginal Native police officer, under the command of sub-Inspector Thomas Coward's unit, killed eight Aboriginal people at Belyando, while sub-Inspector Reginald Uhr, with the support of his troopers and local pastoralists, killed a large number around Natal Downs.

The Aboriginal Native police, under the command of Officer Rogers shot six Aborigines in self defence at Glenmore, sub-Inspector Aubin doing likewise near Morinish and at Yaamba.

Further north, sub-Inspector Robert Arthur Johnstone was leading killings of Aboriginal groups around Mackay, and Nebo, while officers John Murray and Charles Blakeney headed sweeping destructive raids on the local people north of Cardwell. Inspector John Marlow, aided by the detachments of sub-Inspectors John Bacey Isley and Ferdinand Tompson, also continued his punitive missions around the Bowen and Proserpine areas.

While in the Gulf Country of the colony, officer Wentworth D'Arcy Uhr and his troopers massacred around 60–100 native people in series of raids around Burketown. Near Hughenden sub-Inspector Frederick Murray conducted several large "dispersals".

Cecil Hill's brother, W. R. O. Hill, was also a Native Police officer and, in 1867, he and his troopers were accused of killing up to ten Aboriginal people. In the same year, Native Police under the command of Inspector Frederick Wheeler, together with a number of armed pastoralists, perpetrated a very large massacre of native people at Goulbulba Hills near Emerald.

=== Further expansion in the 1870s ===
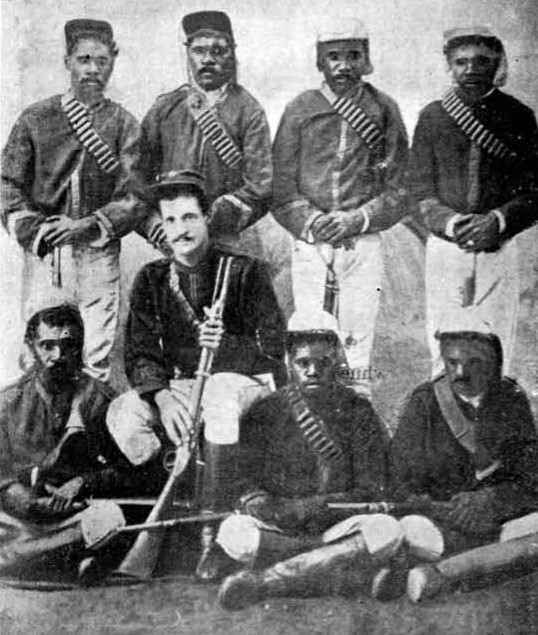
A section of Native Police

As European pastoralists moved further into the north and the west of the colony, Commissioner David Thompson Seymour expand the operations of the Native Police. Not only were the numbers of troopers and officers increased but their weaponry also became more modern. Long range, large bore Snider rifles gradually replaced the carbines and double-barreled rifles previously used. From the early 1870s, the Native Police became a more effective unit of law-enforcement, especially when considering the fact that they would sometimes come up against Aboriginal groups using more short-ranged weaponry such as spears, waddies and boomerangs.

==== Far North Queensland and Torres Strait ====
In 1872, in the far north of the colony, sub-Inspectors Robert Arthur Johnstone and Richard Crompton undertook a sweeping search of Hinchinbrook Island and surrounding islets, in response to the alleged murder of two fishermen.

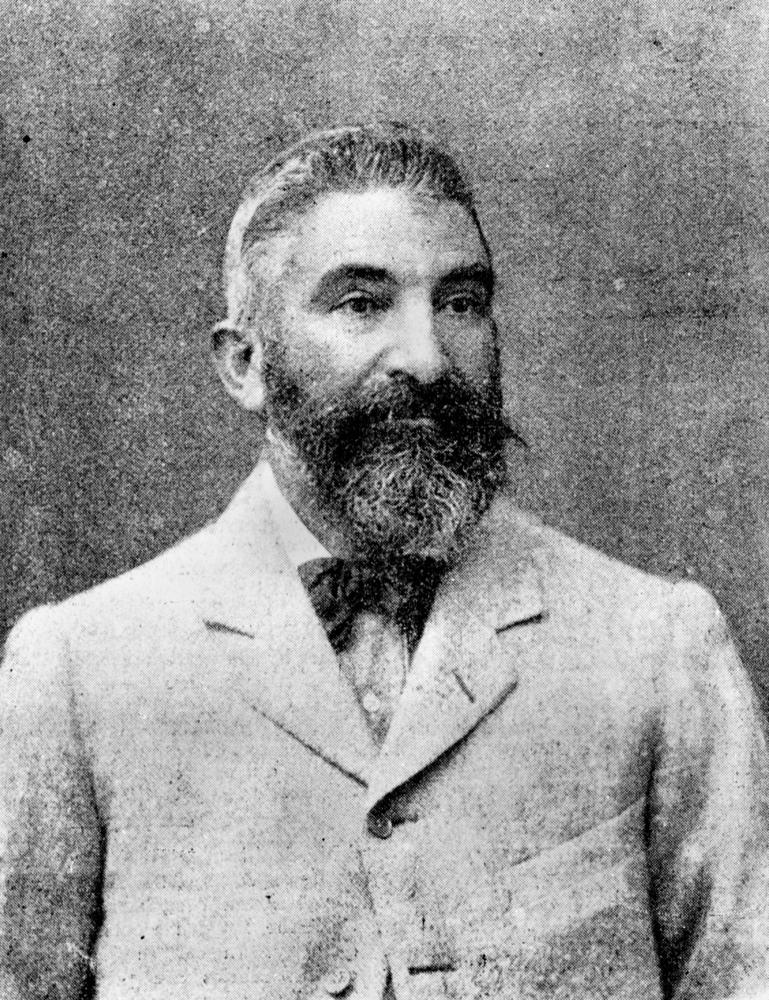
Robert Arthur Johnstone

Also that year, allegations that Johnstone conducted massacres along the coast north of Cardwell, during reprisal raids for the killing of the captain of a shipwrecked vessel Maria, were raised in parliament by the Queensland Premier Arthur Hunter Palmer, who emphatically denied the accusation. Johnstone also prevented a number of Aboriginal people near the Whyandot station from helping shepherds lambing. Johnstone and his troopers allegedly committed numerous massacres at various places along the coast following the killing of Whites at Green Island and during the 1873 North Queensland exploratory expedition led by George Elphinstone Dalrymple.

In the Cumberland Islands, sub-Inspector George Nowlan led his troopers in a dispersal action against the Ngaro people living on Whitsunday Island after they hijacked and burnt the Louisa Maria schooner. The Ngaro who survived the action fled in canoes to the mainland near Mackay and were further pursued by Sergeant Graham and his troopers.

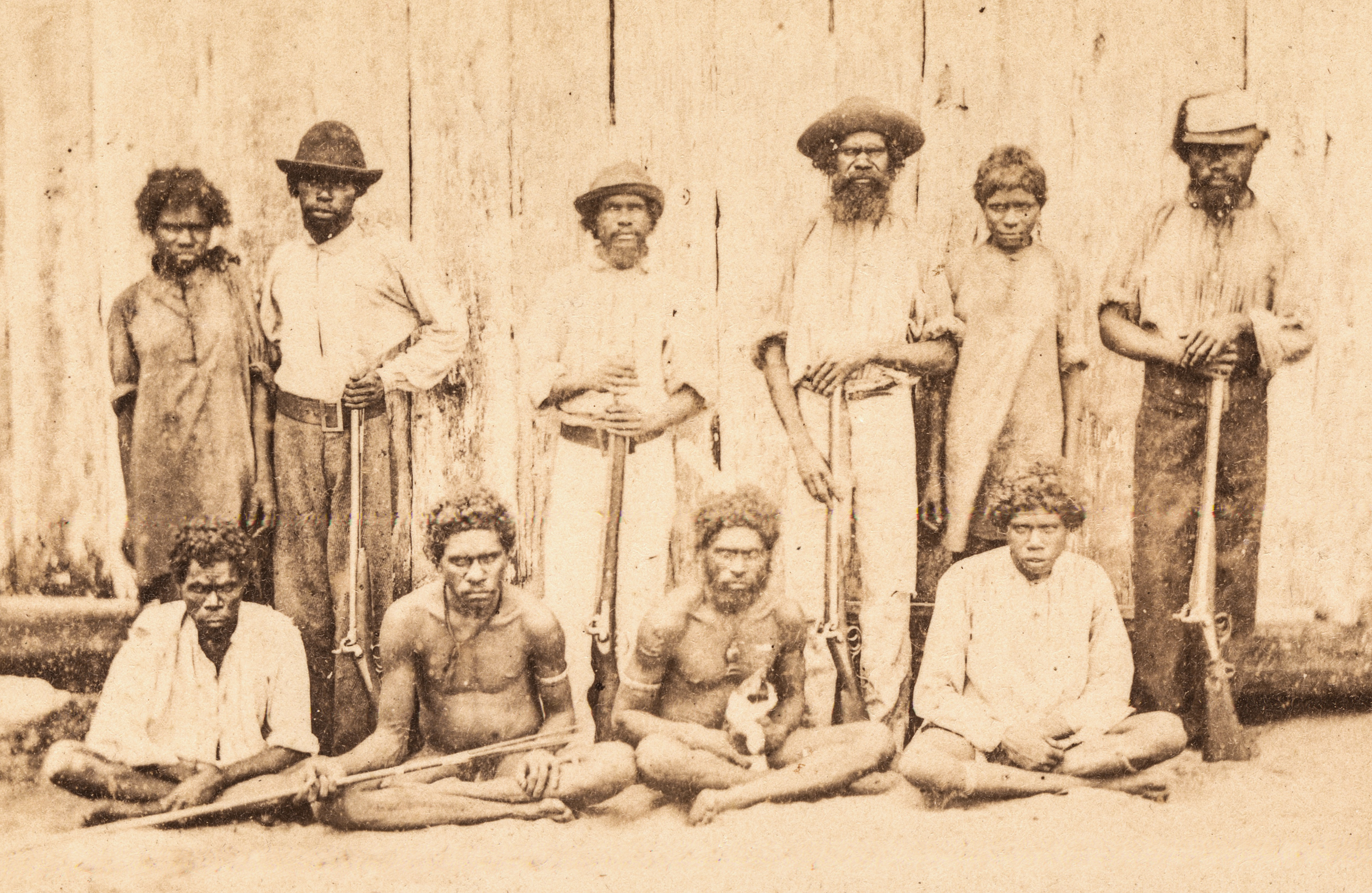
Native troopers at Somerset, Cape York

Further north, at Somerset on the tip of the Cape York Peninsula, officer Frank Jardine, who had previously murdered many Aboriginal people as a drover, led his troopers in massacres against the mainland Yadhaykenu people, and the Kaurareg people of the Torres Strait, after the crew of a ship were murdered by other people. In 1875, sub-Inspector H. M. Chester even managed to lead his troops in a number of pillaging raids of native villages along the Fly River as part of Luigi D'Albertis' journey to the uncolonised southern New Guinea region.

At that time the northern goldfields at Palmer River, Cape River, Hodgkinson River and the Normanby River opened up, causing a massive influx of prospectors and miners. Native Police camps were quickly established in those areas to unreservedly punish any Aboriginal resistance. Sub-Inspectors Alexander Douglas-Douglas, Aulaire Morisset, George Townsend, Lionel Tower, Tom Coward and Stanhope O'Connor, amongst others, conducted regular "dispersals" throughout the 1870s at the sites. In an 1876 first-hand description of one of these Native Police dispersals, Palmer River prospector Arthur Ashwin wrote:

"Just as daylight was breaking we heard volley after volley of rifles. Jack said the black trackers had got on to a mob of wild blacks. We went over the next day and found the niggers camp, they must have been a hundred strong. There were two large fires still alight where the trackers had burnt the dead bodies. We were very lucky the trackers were ahead of us and cleaned this bit of country of the blacks"

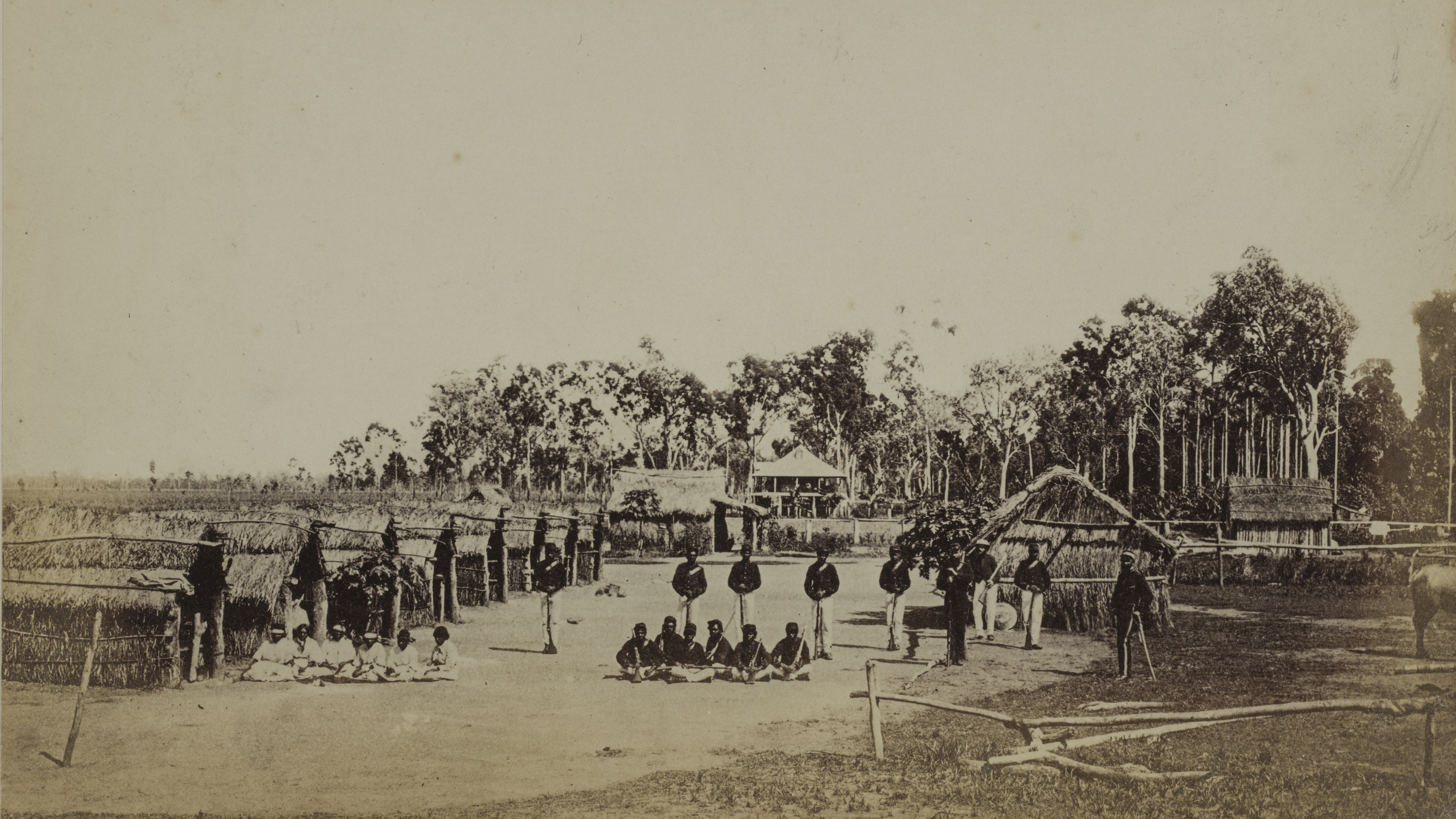
Herbert River Native Mounted Police Camp in the 1870s

A journalist in Cooktown recalled how Douglas' troopers would make notches on the stocks of their rifles for every person they killed in the "nigger raids". One had 25 notches, of which nine were added in a week. In another massacre, Stanhope O'Connor and his troopers killed about 30 Aboriginal people to the north of Cooktown at Cape Bedford. Very soon after committing this mass-killing, O'Connor and his unit were sent to Victoria to assist in the capture of the infamous bushranger Ned Kelly . In the late 1870s, around the Mossman River region, sub-Inspector Robert Little was regularly dispersing groups of native inhabitants.

==== West and Southwest Queensland ====
The Etheridge goldfields, in the vicinity of Georgetown, were also discovered around that time and, as in the north-east of the colony, Native Police barracks were soon constructed. In 1871, sub-Inspector Denis McCarthy and his unit shot dead 17 local Aboriginal people who had murdered Mr. Corbett near Gilberton. North of Boulia, sub-Inspector Eglinton pursued a number of Aboriginal people following the killing of four drovers.

At Bladensburg near Winton at least 100 local tribespeople were allegedly shot down by the detachment of sub-Inspector Moran. In 1876, two detachments of Native police under the command of Sub-Inspectors William Edington Armit and Lyndon Poingdestre attacked a large number of Aboriginal people displaying "determined resistance" at Creen Creek after they had attacked a telegraph station.

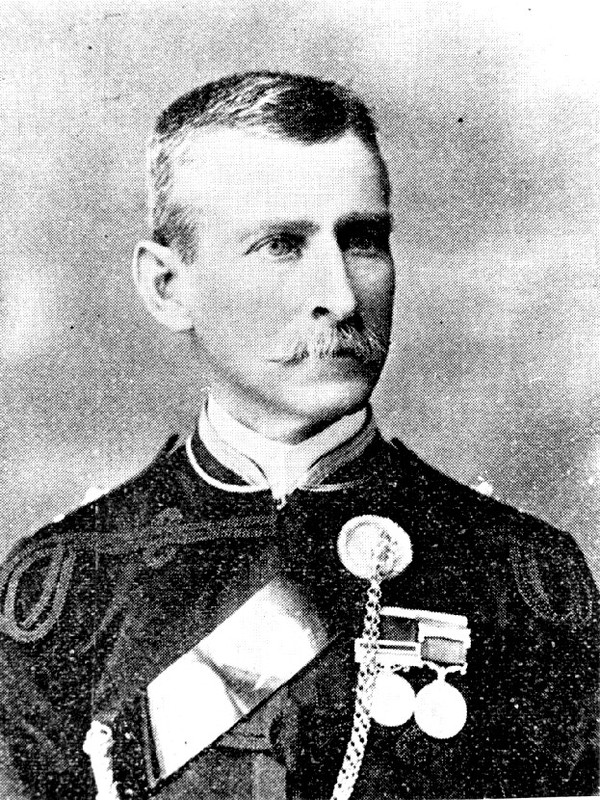
Alexander Douglas-Douglas

In the south-west of the colony, many dispersals of Aboriginal people occurred in the 1870s at the hands of the Native Police. After the killings of pastoralists Welford, Maloney and Dowling, Native Police, based at places such as Tambo and Thargomindah, went on numerous punitive expeditions, often assisted by stockmen. For example, sub-Inspector Armstrong dispersed a camp in the Cheviot Range, sub-Inspector Gilmour did likewise near the future towns of Betoota and Birdsville. Sub-Inspectors Gough and Kaye led a lengthy mission of dispersals from Bluff Station near Birdsville north to Glengyle Station. Other officers such as Cheeke, Dunne and Stafford led further missions throughout this decade.

In 1876, two officers in the force were charged with murder. In the first case, Sub-Inspector John Carroll, stationed at Aramac, shot one of his troopers dead and flogged another after he thought one of the tropers had attempted to poison them. He was also charged with chaining up an Aboriginal woman by her legs continuously for a month. The murder charge was dismissed due to lack of evidence. In the second case, Inspector Frederick Wheeler was charged after a prolonged and brutal flogging at the Belyando barracks led to the death of an Aboriginal man from peritonitis.

Public incidents such as those forced the government into a commission of enquiry in regards to ameliorating the condition of Aboriginal people. After some initial research, the commission requested a grant of £1600 from parliament to implement reserves for the Indigenous population. Parliament quickly denied the funds and in 1878 the commission was wound up.

=== Intense conflict 1880–1884 ===
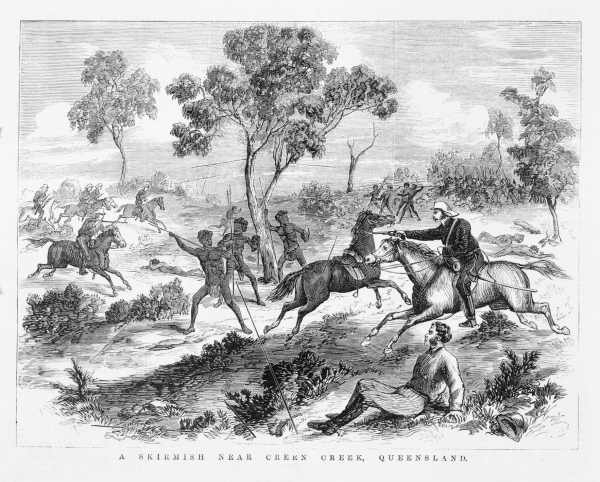
Skirmish with Native Police at Creen Creek

The Native Mounted Police expanded in the early 1880s. By 1882, Commissioner Seymour had 184 officers and troopers in this force at his disposal.

In 1881, there were reports of some notable incidents of murder. In February, sub-Inspector George Dyas was speared and clubbed to death by Aboriginal people near the isolated town of Croydon. Sub-Inspector Kaye was speared through the heart and killed in a desperate defensive action by an Aboriginal man.

Many Indigenous people were killed following the incident. Some fled the shootings by going to another town in Gilberton and sought protection with the police there.

Later that same year Mary Watson, the wife of a beche-de-mer fisherman at Lizard Island was attacked by local Aboriginal people. A Chinese workman named Ah Leong was killed and Mary, her baby and another workman named Ah Sam escaped in a large iron boiling pot which was quickly improvised into a makeshift raft. It was assumed that the three were later killed by Aboriginal people from the McIvor River to the north of Cooktown. Sub-Inspector Hervey Fitzgerald led a series of reprisal raids in which "tenfold vengeance has been exacted". It was later discovered that Mrs Watson, her baby and Ah Sam had drifted onto a nearby island and died of thirst.

In January 1883, near the mining township of Cloncurry, the local Kalkadoon and Maithakari people attacked a Native Police camp, which resulted in the death of a Native Police officer. Sub-Inspector Marcus Beresford was also beaten to death and several of his troopers wounded. A massacre perpetrated by the Native Police were afterwards conducted, but in the following year the Kalkadoon were still able to kill the well-known pastoralist James Powell at Calton Hills. In response, sub-Inspector Frederic Urquhart, his troopers tracked down a group of around 150 Kalkadoon. This dispersal came to be known as the Conflict of Battle Mountain. Urquhart and his troopers stayed in the area on patrol for a further nine weeks, killing more Aboriginal people.

=== The Irvinebank massacre ===
The Irvinebank massacre of October 1884 is widely regarded as the turning point in the history of the Native Police, after which a gradual reduction in the force began. Sub-Inspector William Nichols, who was involved in the earlier Woolgar killings, was stationed with his troopers at the Nigger Creek barracks. He led a patrol to Irvinebank which resulted in two Aboriginal males being captured and shot dead, followed by the slaughter of an old man, two women and child. The government of Samuel Griffith pursued murder charges against Nichols and his troopers. While the seven troopers were kept in prison on remand for some time, the charges against Nichols were quickly thrown out due to a lack of evidence. Nichols was dismissed from the force, and some detachments of Native Police were disbanded and replaced with normal police units. The operations of the Native Police, however, still continued relatively unabated for the rest of the 1880s with the force receiving more modern weaponry in the form of Martini-Henry rifles in 1884.

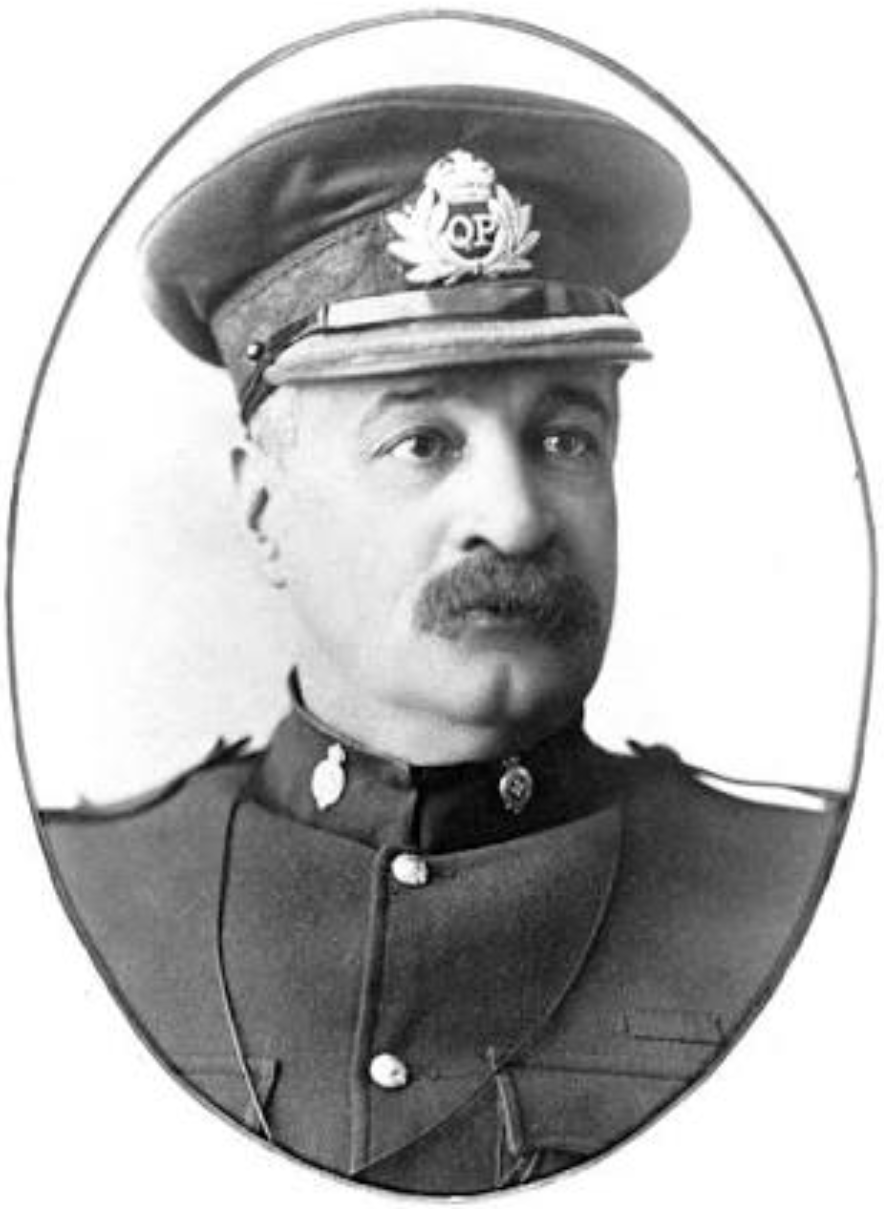
Frederic Urquhart

Examples of the further conflict include reports by sub-Inspector James Lamond, based at the Carl Creek barracks near the Lawn Hill run of Frank Hann, that the Native police shot "over 100 blacks" from 1883 to 1885 on that pastoral lease alone. Frank Hann, his property manager Jack Watson and Frank Shadforth on the neighbouring Lilydale station also shot large numbers of Aboriginal people in this region themselves. A visitor to Lawn Hill described how Jack Watson had 40 pairs of ears taken from Aboriginal people shot in reprisals and nailed them to the walls of his residence. Hann himself was wounded in a violent encounter on Lawn Hill station with the Aboriginal outlaw, Joe Flick. In this shoot-out, Flick killed Native Police sub-Inspector Alfred Wavell before dying of wounds himself. Near the Batavia River in the extreme far north, sub-Inspector Frederic Urquhart dispersed a large number of Aboriginal people following the killing of pastoralist Edmund Watson, with Urquhart being speared in the leg during this operation. In the rainforest areas of far north eastern coast, the dispersals also continued. Naturalist Robert Grant observed a number of massacres by the Native Police during his scientific expedition to the Atherton Tableland region in the late 1880s. He obtained two Aboriginal children after one of these massacres, one of which was a boy who he took back to New South Wales and raised in Scottish tradition. This boy became Douglas Grant, the notable Aboriginal who fought for the British Empire in World War I.

=== Changing of policy from 1890 ===
By 1890, atrocities by the Native Police were coming under increased scrutiny from members of the public and the press. A. J. Vogan's novel 'Black Police', published in that year, was closely based on incidents that Vogan said he saw or investigated in 1888–1889. The book included stories of massacres committed by the Queensland Native Police in close cooperation with settlers antagonistic to the presence of Aboriginal people on or near their runs. Continued newspaper focus on incidents, an increasingly influential social criticism, and the shifting of the colonial frontier into the Northern Territory and British New Guinea eventually had some effect on changing the Queensland government's policy of "dispersal".

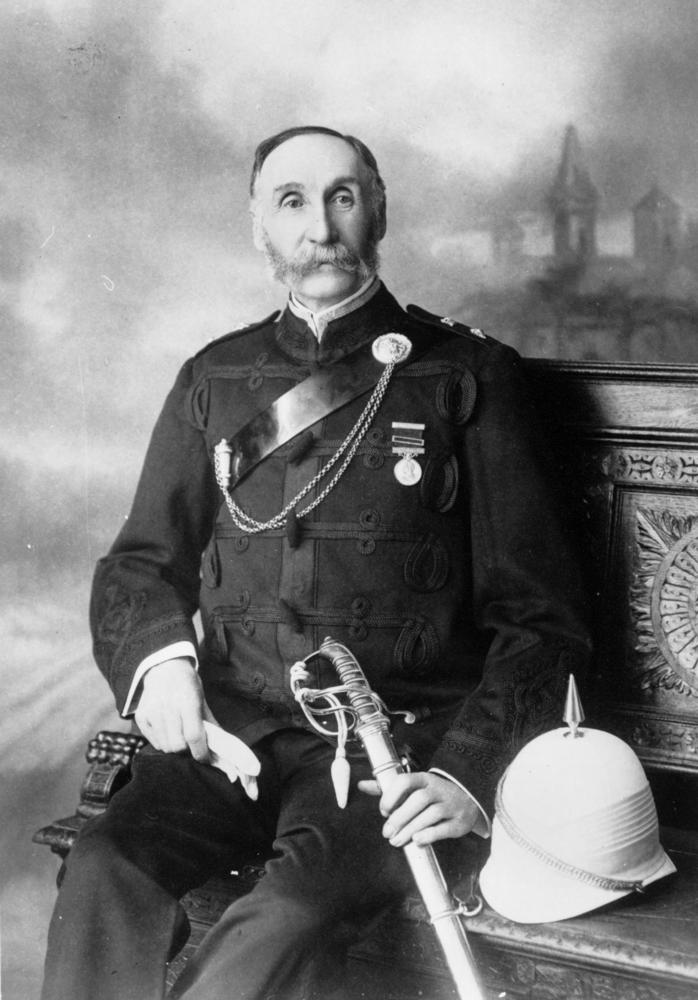
William Parry-Okeden

In 1889, two police officials in the Herberton area, Charles Hansen and Andrew Zillman, experimented with allocating rations to displaced Aboriginal people instead of shooting them. They found that the trial was a success with an almost complete reduction in the spearing of cattle and settler casualties. Leading officials of the Queensland government, in particular the Colonial Secretary Horace Tozer, opted to expand the funding of the rationing experiment. As a result, the Native Police budget was dramatically reduced with only 45 troopers and a handful of officers being employed in 1895. 1895 also saw David Thompson Seymour, the long serving Queensland Police Commissioner who commanded the exterminating operations of the Native Police for thirty years, replaced with the more moderate William Parry-Okeden. Also in that year, Tozer commissioned Archibald Meston to conduct a thorough research report into the condition of Aboriginal people in the colony. Meston recommended the often discussed proposal of segregating Aboriginal people from White society and forcibly detaining them on isolated reserves. This report was largely accepted by the government and led to the passing of the Aboriginal Protection Act of 1897. For most Aboriginal people in the colony of Queensland, this meant that they faced a reduced likelihood of being shot but also had almost all aspects of their lives controlled by the government. Even though Meston recommended the immediate disbanding of the Native Police, this aspect was rejected with Native Police units continuing to operate out of a number of barracks on the Cape York Peninsula and in the Gulf Country.

=== Operations from 1890 to 1905 ===
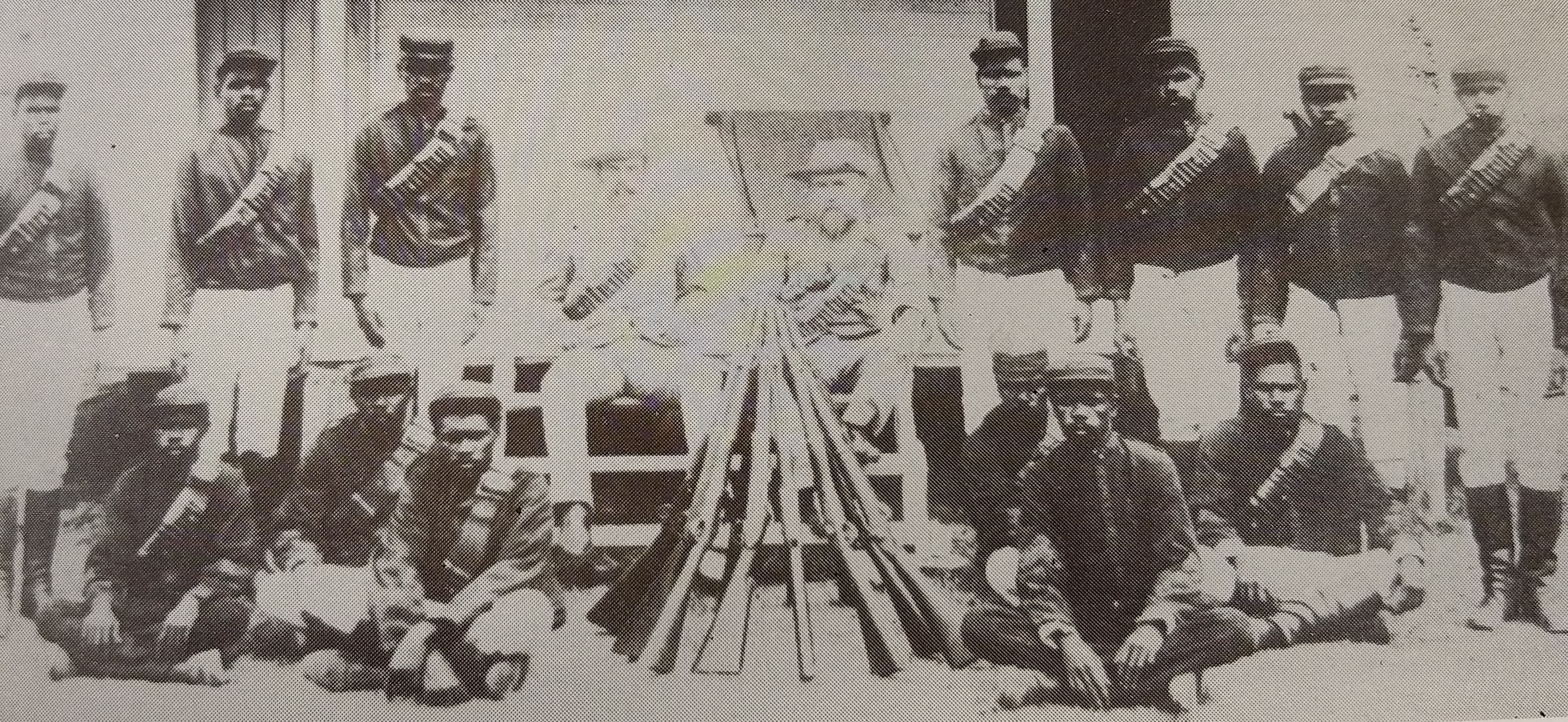
Native Police with constables Bateman and Whiteford at Musgrave barracks around 1898

Many Native Police troops in this period were decommissioned or redeployed as unarmed trackers to work with regular police. Also, a considerable number of mission stations were utilised to assist in providing food for local Aboriginal populations.

In 1893, a very large group consisting of 20 Native Police troopers led by sub-Inspector Charles Savage, together were sent to investigate the murders of Charles Bruce and Captain Rowe near the Ducie River in the far north. Aboriginal people in this area had murdered at least eight men. When the Native police encountered about 300 attacking Aboriginal people, a sharp engagement occurred, killing five troopers. In 1894, the Aboriginal head man responsible for the murder of Bill Baird was captured. After the murder of Donald MacKenzie at Lakefield station in 1896, the Native Police found many of the local tribe dead from arsenic poisoning when they mistook the poison for baking powder.

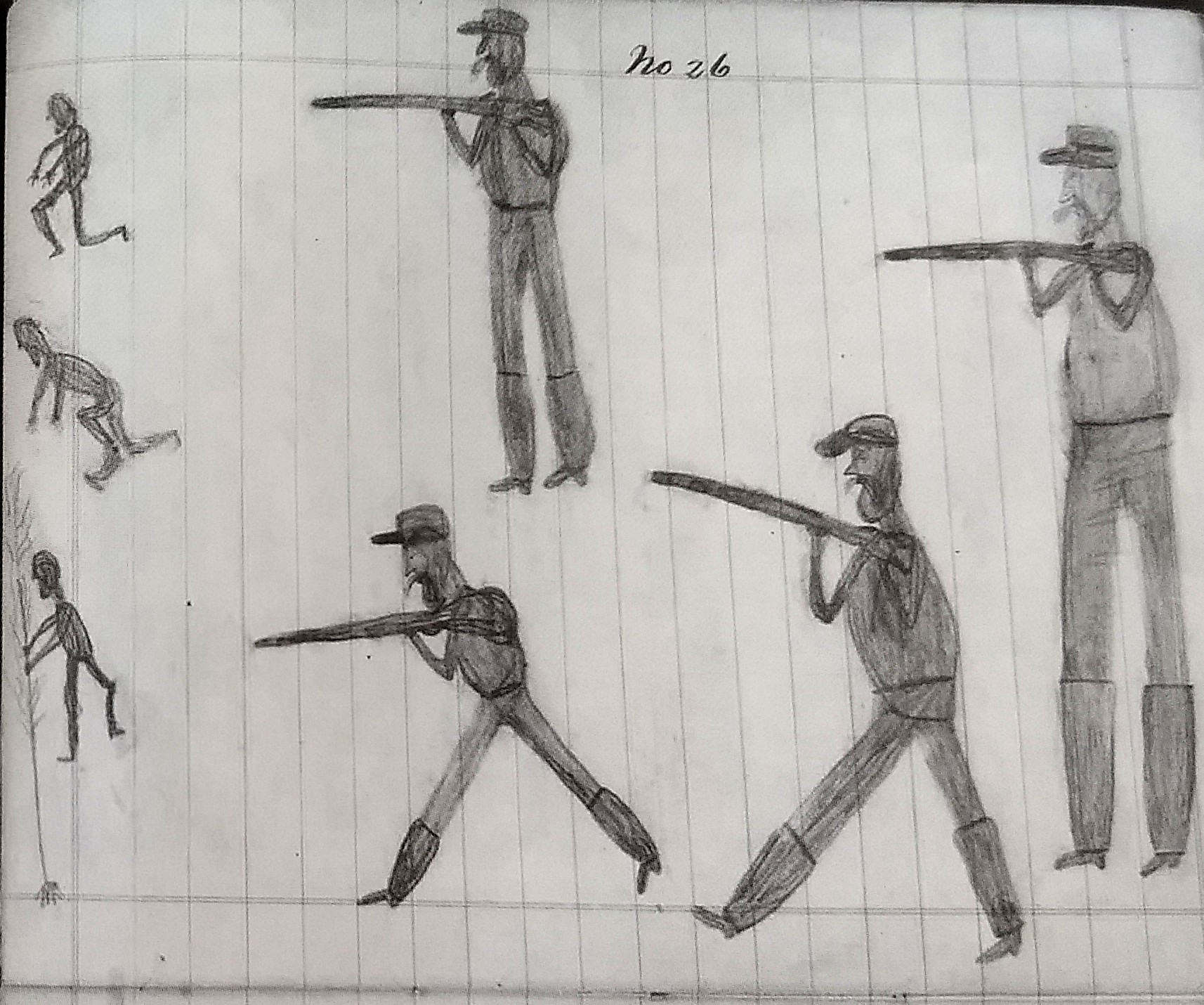
Drawing by Aboriginal boy Oscar of a Native Police dispersal

Toward the border with the Northern Territory in the Gulf Country, the last operational barracks in this region was at Turn Off Lagoon near to where the modern-day community of Doomadgee is now located. In 1896 after the murder of Cresswell Downs manager, Thomas Perry, this unit shot a large number of Aboriginal people in that region. Indiscriminate dispersals also followed the spearing of Harry Shadforth at Wollogorang Station in 1897. Constables Richard Alford and Timothy Lyne were in charge of these troopers at this time. An Aboriginal boy named Oscar who was kidnapped from the Cooktown area by Native Police and brought to work at Rocklands station near Camooweal, made some unique recordings of the operations of the Native Police based at Turn Off Lagoon. From 1895 to 1899, Oscar produced a number of drawings depicting Native Police troopers shooting tribal Aboriginal people either as they were running away or as they were tied to trees.

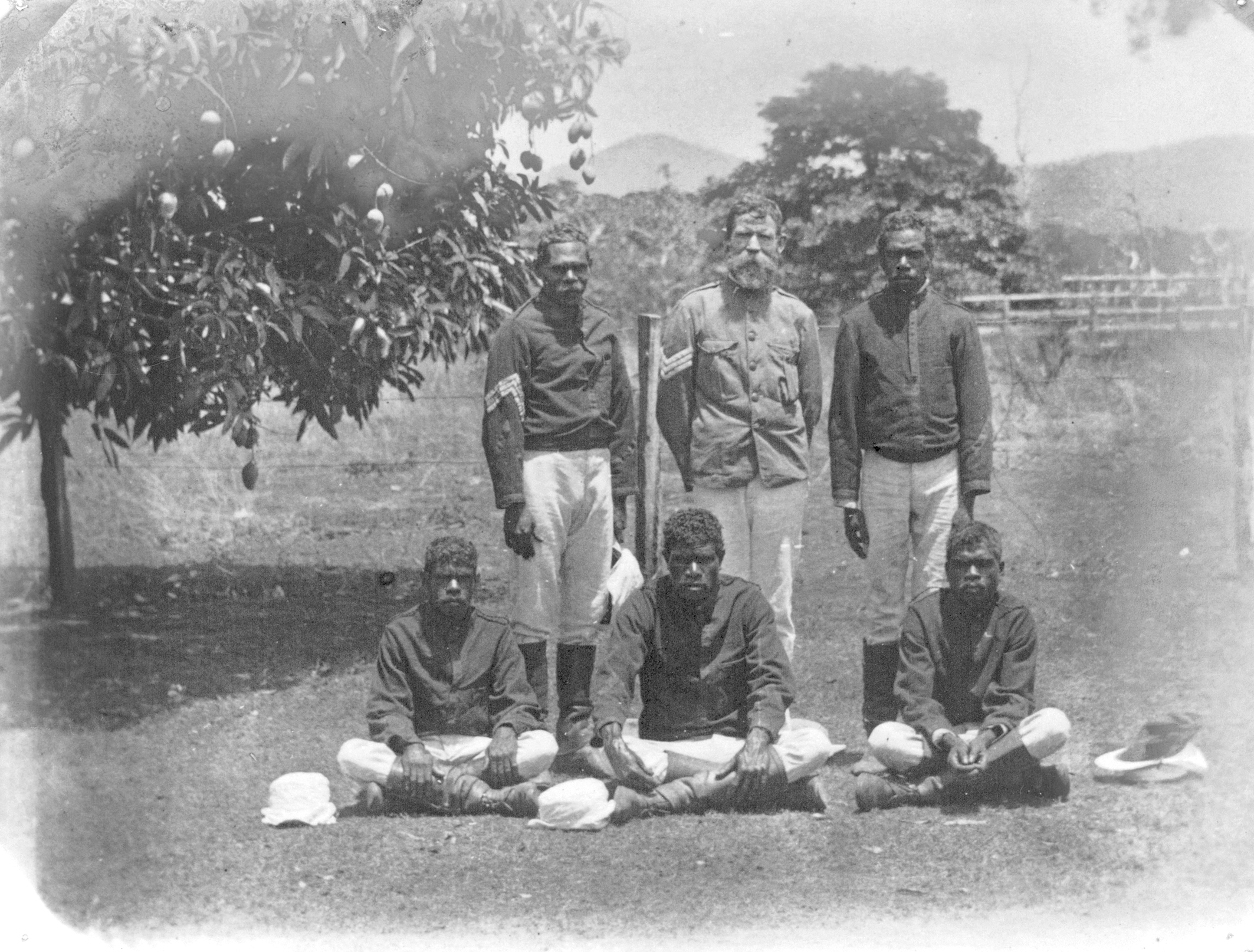
Sergeant James Wylie Whiteford with troopers at Coen, Cape York

While travelling near the Wenlock River, Reverend Gilbert White and anthropologist Walter Roth were shown the remains of four local Aboriginal men shot dead by Native Police in a surprise attack. Reports reached Commissioner William Parry-Okeden and a large investigation ensued. The officer in charge, constable John Hoole was acquitted of any wrongdoing but was transferred and soon after forced into retirement.

By 1909, the only functional Native Police barracks remaining was at Coen but this was manned by only several veteran troopers. This barracks finally closed in 1929. Native police still officially had a role in Queensland until at least the 1960s with unarmed troopers being assigned to maintain control in Aboriginal isolation and detention facilities such as the Palm Island facility. Eddie Mabo gave a description of these native police on his visit to Palm Island in 1957.

During the decades of service of the Native Police, the number of troopers sat above 800 and the number of officers sat around 400.

It is difficult to ascertain the number of casualties sustained due to the scarcity of records regarding the lives and deaths of Native Police troopers, but it can be assumed that attrition was rather stark considering the abysmal conditions on the Australian frontier.

== South Australia ==
Commissioner Alexander Tolmer formed the South Australian Native Police Force in 1852 at the specific direction of the South Australian Government. Later that year a newspaper reported, "A dozen powerful natives, chiefly of the Moorundee tribe [from Blanchetown, South Australia district on the River Murray], have been selected to be sent to the Port Lincoln district to act as Mounted Police." The little corps, under the command of Mounted Police Corporal John Cusack (1809–1887), sailed for Port Lincoln on the government schooner Yatala on 29 December 1852, for service on Eyre Peninsula. It was confidently expected they would be usefully employed in protection of the settlers in that district.

The Native Police were soon extended, the strength in 1856 being: Murray District (based at Moorundee and Wellington): 2 inspectors, 2 corporals, 13 constables, 16 horses; Venus Bay: 1 sergeant, 1 corporal, 7 constables, 8 horses; and at Port Augusta: 3 constables and 2 horses. The six officers were all European, while the twenty-three constables were all Aboriginal, all being issued with standard police arms and uniforms.

Both Aboriginal and European offenders were brought to justice by these men, but on the Eyre Peninsula the Aboriginal people were largely ineffectual as they were in unfamiliar territory, while on the Murray the majority of the troopers abandoned the force to work on nearby farms and did not return. The force appears to have had a limited role in frontier conflict as much of the violence during the period of colonisation had already subsided in the regions in which they were stationed.

In 1857 it was abolished as a distinct corps, although a few Aboriginal constables continued to be employed from time to time at certain remote police stations. Also, Aboriginal trackers were employed as needed, but were not sworn police constables. In 1884 a native police scheme was revived by the South Australia Police in Central Australia (see Northern Territory, below), and the operations of this force were similar to the notorious Queensland and New South Wales corps.

== Northern Territory ==
In 1884, the South Australian Police Commissioner, William John Peterswald established a Native Police Force. Six Aboriginal men were recruited in November 1884. Aged between 17 and 26 years of age, they came from Alice Springs, Charlotte Waters, Undoolya and Macumba. The Native Police became notorious for their violent activities, especially under the command of Constable William Willshire. In 1891, two Aboriginal men were 'shot whilst attempting to escape'. The deaths were noticed and the South Australian Register called for an Enquiry to establish whether or not police had been justified in killing the two Aboriginal men.

Eventually, F. J. Gillen, Telegraph Stationmaster and Justice of the Peace at Alice Springs, received instructions from the Government to investigate the matter and report to the Attorney-General. Gillen found Willshire responsible for ordering the killings. At the conclusion of Gillen's investigation, Willshire was suspended, arrested and charged with murder. He became the first Northern Territory police officer charged with this offence. He was subsequently acquitted.

== Nauru ==
Australian and British forces took command of Nauru from German control in late 1914. The Germans had set up their own Native Police force on the island with the troopers being from New Guinea. These quickly changed allegiance to the British and were utilised maintaining order over the Kanaka and Chinese coolie labourers mining the guano deposits. By the 1920s the troopers were mostly from Tuvalu and the Gilbert Islands with some local men and Māori from New Zealand also being employed. In 1930, the Native Police subdued a riot amongst the Chinese workers which saw one trooper killed and 18 labourers injured. During World War II many troopers remained loyal to the British and conducted espionage operations while Nauru was under Japanese control. After the war, the island and its Native Police returned to being under Anglo-Australian administration.

The 1948 Nauru riots followed a strike by Chinese guano mining workers over pay and conditions. The Administrator for Nauru, Eddie Ward, imposed a state of emergency with the Native Police and armed volunteers of locals and Australian officials being mobilised. This force, using sub-machine guns and other firearms, opened fire on the Chinese workers killing two and wounding sixteen. Around 50 of the workers were arrested and two of these were bayoneted to death while in custody. The Native Police trooper who bayoneted the prisoners was charged but later acquitted on grounds that the wounds were "accidentally received." The governments of the Soviet Union and China made official complaints against Australia at the United Nations over this incident. The Native Police was eventually replaced with a civilian police force once Nauru became self-governing in 1966.

== See also ==
- Genocide of Indigenous Australians
- Aboriginal tracker
- First Nations Police (Ontario)
- History of Victoria
- History of Queensland
- List of massacres of Indigenous Australians
- United States Indian Police
- Victorian gold rush
- White Woman of Gippsland
