= Edric Norfolk Vaux Morisset =

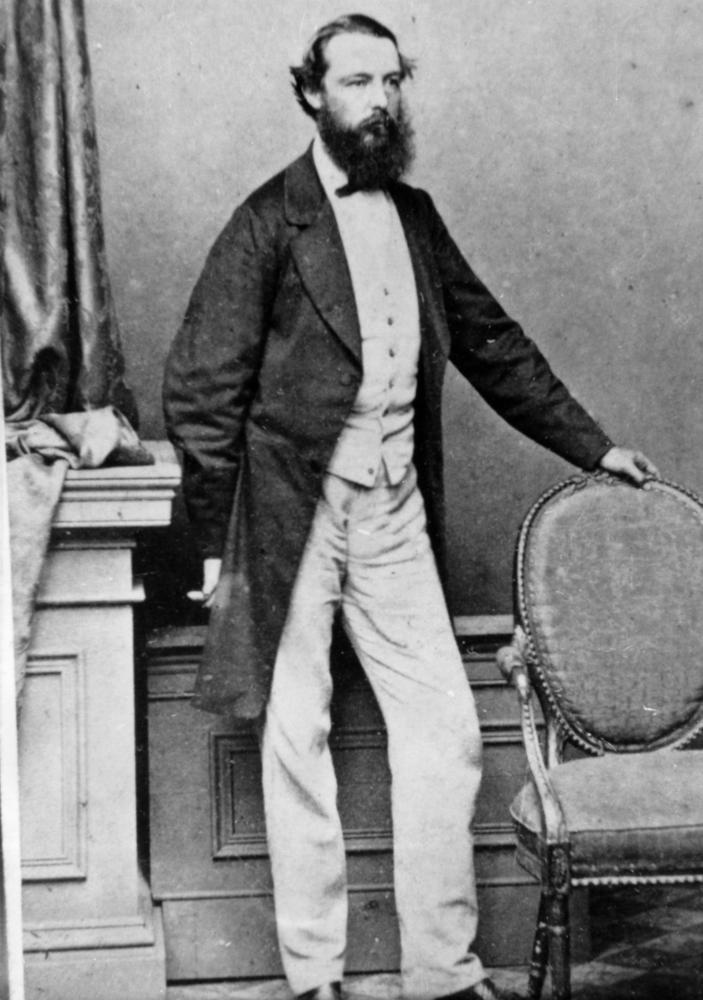
- Edric Norfolk Vaux Morisset in 1862

Commandant of the paramilitary Native Police
- In office 1857–1861

Personal details
- Born: June 22, 1830 Norfolk Island, Australia
- Died: August 26, 1887 (aged 57) Goulburn, New South Wales, Australia

Edric Norfolk Vaux Morisset (22 June 1830 – 26 August 1887) was a high-ranking officer in both the paramilitary and civilian police forces of the New South Wales and Queensland colonies of the British Empire. He was Commandant of the paramilitary Native Police from 1857 to 1861 and concurrently became the first Inspector General of Police in Queensland in 1860. Morisset afterwards was appointed Superintendent of Police at Bathurst and then later on at Maitland. From 1883 until his death in 1887, Morisset was Superintendent of the Southern Districts and Deputy Inspector General of Police in New South Wales.

== Early life ==
Edric Morisset was born at Norfolk Island in 1830 when it was a notoriously draconian penal colony. His father was Lieutenant-Colonel James Thomas Morisset, who was in command of this convict outpost. During his first four years of life, Edric would have observed the extremely harsh punitive system meted out to the prisoners under his father's direction. These included an average 1,000 flogging sentences per year and the use of long term solitary confinement in soundproof and completely dark "dumb cells". After a convict uprising in 1834, Edric was shipped off the island to the Australian mainland. His father was re-appointed soon after as a police magistrate and the family moved to Bathurst.

== Native Police ==
Edric's father died in 1852, leaving his large family in financial distress after losing most of their savings in the collapse of the Bank of Australia. Edric had to make a career for himself and in February 1853 was appointed as a Lieutenant in the Native Police at the age of 23. The Native Police was a government-funded paramilitary force consisting of Aboriginal troopers led by European officers. Its main purpose was to exploit inter-tribal hostility to violently disperse Aboriginal resistance to European colonisation in Australia. He was assigned firstly to the 3rd and then to the 5th Division of this force and posted to the Clarence River region of New South Wales, arriving there in July of that year. He established the main barracks for the force in the region on the Orara River, 10 miles south of Grafton. Morisset remained in the Clarence region for the next two and half years and led a number of dispersals. One of these occurred at Newton Boyd where several Aboriginals were shot dead and some others captured while working at a shearing shed. Another was the East Ballina massacre where around forty Bundjalung people were killed and many more wounded by Native Police in an early morning raid on their hillside sleeping site.

In early 1856, Morisset was transferred to Wide Bay-Burnett region taking charge of the 8th Division based at Yabba station at the head of Yabba Falls. By April of the same year he was posted to the headquarters of the Native Police at Traylan on the Burnett River just north of Eidsvold.

== Commandant of the Native Police ==
In May 1857, Morisset was appointed to the position of Commandant of the Native Police. This was the highest rank in that force, a position previously held by Richard Purvis Marshall and before him, Frederick Walker. The Native Police at this time was underfunded and disorganised with disbanding and desertion of troopers being common. However, strong resistance by Aboriginals in the Dawson River area later that year resulted in six colonists being killed at Eurombah and a further 11 being killed at nearby Hornet Bank. These events caused the colonial Queensland government to increase the punitive efficiency of the force, with Morisset re-organising the troopers and appointing new officers such as Frederick Wheeler and George Murray. With this restructure, the number of punitive expeditions increased resulting in more frequent mass extrajudicial shootings of Aboriginals. Lieutenants Carr, Moorhead and Powell headed some of these missions in the months immediately after the Hornet Bank incident. The indiscriminate nature of the shootings involved was evident from the report of Powell detailing how he shot dead three native women in the back as they were fleeing. At this period, other vigilante groups of colonists and private native police groups were also conducting ethnic cleansing operations in central Queensland resulting in the reported deaths of over 200 Aboriginals.

Edric Morisset was Commandant up until July 1861 when he resigned and was replaced by John O'Connell Bligh. In the years between Hornet Bank and his resignation, there were a number of notable "dispersals" of Aboriginals conducted by the Native Police under his reign. In August 1858, Morisset orchestrated a large combined force of four divisions with a month's rations each to scour and clear the Upper Dawson River area of the indigenous population. Lieutenant Bligh conducted multiple shooting raids at Maryborough, and Auburn River. Lieutenant John Murray conducted massacres in the Wide Bay and Castle Creek areas, while Lieutenant Wheeler and his troops shot Aboriginals at Dugandan and Calliope. Edric's brother, Rudolph was also an officer with the Native Police at this time and led a massacre perpetrated at Manumbar.

A number of battles between the Native Police and large groups of resisting Aboriginals also occurred in this period. At Bendemere on the Condamine River, a stand up skirmish took place between the "Dawson blacks" and Lieutenant Carr's troopers resulting in fifteen dead warriors including their leader Baulie. In the Pine Rivers region north of Brisbane, Lieutenant Williams lost a trooper killed in a battle with a large number of the Ningi Ningi tribe. This level of hostility and death in various skirmishes did not go unnoticed and an inquiry was enforced upon the Queensland government towards the end of Morisset's tenure. This 1861 inquiry detailed many of the atrocities inflicted on the Aboriginal people, but in the end the government saw no need to change the overall operation of the Native Police, and its methods continued in the same vein for around forty more years after Morisset's retirement.

== Inspector General of Police in Queensland ==
During his leadership of the Native Police, Morisset was also appointed at the first overall Inspector General of Police in Queensland. He only held this role for around 6 months in 1860 as it was deemed impractical to have the head of the frontier Native Police sitting in an office in Albert Street in Brisbane. During this brief period, however, Morisset managed to aggrieve some members of the public.

== Police Superintendent Positions in New South Wales ==
After retiring from the Native Police in Queensland, Morisset returned to New South Wales to take up police superintendent positions firstly at Bathurst in 1862 and then later at Maitland. In 1883, he was promoted to superintendent of police of the Southern Districts based at Goulburn. During this time he was also concurrently appointed as Deputy Inspector General of Police in New South Wales.

== Personal life ==
Morisset married Eliza Lawson, a granddaughter of the army officer and pastoralist William Lawson, in 1860. They had no children. Two of Morisset's brothers, Rudolph and Aulaire, also joined the Native Police as officers.

== Death ==
Morisset died at his Marston mansion in Goulburn in 1887 of Addison's disease at the age of 57. He is buried at the Goulburn Saint Saviours Anglican Cemetery in Goulburn. His Marston place of residence became St.Michael's Antiochian village.
