= John O'Connell Bligh =

Native Police commandant

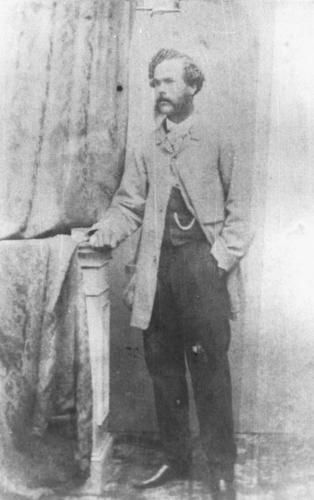
John O'Connell Bligh, c. 1870

John O'Connell Bligh (3 March 1834 – 12 October 1880) was a Native Police officer in the British colonies of New South Wales and Queensland. He achieved the rank of Commandant of this colonial paramilitary force from 1861 to 1864. Bligh is probably best known for an incident in Maryborough, where he shot a number of Aboriginal Australians along the main street and into the adjoining Mary River. After retiring from the Native Police, Bligh became a police magistrate in the towns of Gayndah and Gympie.

== Early life ==
John O'Connell Bligh was born in 1834 in Buckinghamshire, England. He was a grandson of Vice-Admiral William Bligh, the former Governor of New South Wales and central figure of the mutiny on the Bounty and the Rum Rebellion. Bligh was also a nephew of former Lieutenant Governor, Sir Maurice Charles O'Connell. He emigrated to Australia probably around 1850 and lived with his brother Richard John Bligh who had been Commissioner for Crown Lands and head of the Border Police at Warialda since 1847. John was appointed Registrar of the Small Debts Court at Warialda in 1852.

== Lieutenant in Native Police ==
Bligh was appointed by the New South Wales Government to the position of sub-Lieutenant in the Native Police on 7 April 1853. He was nineteen years old. Bligh seems to have been posted to the Wide Bay region on a regular basis early on in his career.

== Capture of John 'Gilburri' Fahy ==
He captured a runaway convict named John Gilburri Fahy who had been living with the local Wide Bay aboriginals for over twelve years. In order to arrest Gilburri, Bligh and his troopers handcuffed all the station Aboriginal workers at Barambah pastoral station around a large gum tree overnight to prevent him from receiving any information that the Native Police were nearby. Fahy was sent to Cockatoo Island prison but was soon assigned to be an interpreter on the exploratory journey of A.C. Gregory.

== Further Native Police operations ==
In 1854 and 1855, Bligh was transferred to the 8th Division of the Native Police based at the Yabba barracks in the Conondale Range and at Maryborough. The funding of the Native Police at this stage was uncertain and Bligh had trouble with equipment supplies and the mutinous conduct of some of his Aboriginal troopers. Corporal Donald threatened to hit and handcuff him. Ten days later, Bligh reported that Donald died of dysentery. During this period, he pursued a group of Aboriginal people who had committed "depredations" in the Mary Valley to the coast and massacred them at Teewah Beach.

In October 1855, Bligh was sent to the Clarence River area to take charge of the section there as a 2nd Lieutenant. In June 1857, he was appointed to 1st Lieutenant of the Native Police by Commandant Edric Norfolk Vaux Morisset. Bligh was stationed mostly in the Wide Bay-Burnett region or on missions involving the recruitment of troopers for the force around the Clarence River districts. In 1859, he was involved in dispersing Aboriginals attending the Bunya festival in the Conondale Range. The Aboriginals fled to nearby Manumbar where the proprietor noticed that "the fear of Bligh acts like a hangman's whip" over them.

The Governor General of New South Wales appointed John O'Connell Bligh of the Native Police to be a Magistrate for New South Wales on 30 August 1858.

== Maryborough incident ==
In early 1860, Bligh and his troopers, then stationed at Coopers Plain barracks just to the south-west of Maryborough, chased a number of Aboriginals into the town. In broad daylight and in front of the citizens of Maryborough, these Aboriginals were shot down. Several were killed and an unknown number were wounded. At one stage, Bligh requisitioned a boat in order to shoot two Aboriginals who had fled into the Mary River. A meeting was held in the courthouse to collect money for a gift of appreciation to give to Bligh. At a ceremony later organised by the high-profile Maryborough people, Bligh was given a ceremonial sword as a reward for his actions. However, his actions divided the town, with the Maryborough Chronicle describing it as "one of the most disgraceful acts ever perpetrated by any community, a blot so foul and deep-stained as will leave on this otherwise fair portion of God’s earth the brand of eternal infamy". The Moreton Bay Courier listed the names of individual Aborigines who had been killed, including Darkey (who was shot down in the street and later roasted) and Young Snatchem (who was driven into the river before Bligh "shot the defenceless, tired, unresisting wretch, in the back").

On 8 July 1861 Lieut John O'Connell Bligh was examined regarding the above incident by the Select Committee on the Native Police Force and the Condition of the Aborigines generally. The Select Committee also questioned other witnesses regarding Bligh's actions in the same incident. The Select Committee asked his opinion of suggested restructure or disbandment of the Force.

== Commandant of the Native Police ==
After the retirement of E.N.V. Morisset, John O'Connell Bligh was appointed Commandant of the Native Police in July 1861. His first major duty as Commandant involved organising the severe reprisals for the Cullin-la-ringo massacre where, in October 1861, Aboriginals around the Nogoa River killed nineteen settlers. Bligh travelled to the area and personally oversaw the operations. Colonists in the Nogoa region such as Charles Boydell Dutton described how these operations consisted of orders to Native Police officers to "disperse blacks wherever they found them." Bligh himself dispersed members of peaceful tribes working for the colonists and galloped his horse over an Aboriginal woman causing her extensive injuries.

Bligh was the commanding officer of the force as the British expanded into the Northern parts of Eastern Australia into areas such as Bowen, Peak Downs and Mackay. The Native Police under Bligh were instrumental in enforcing colonial rule over the Aboriginals in these areas. For much of the time Bligh administered the force from the barracks at Murrays Lagoon near Rockhampton. It was here in late 1863 that he received a kick to the face from a horse that caused severe facial and head injuries.

== Police Magistrate ==
The reorganisation of the Queensland Police force in early 1864 saw the position of Commandant of the Native Police abolished and the force came under the direct auspices of the new Queensland Police Commissioner, David Thompson Seymour. Bligh was retired from the force and took up a police magistrate position at Gayndah. While in this position, Bligh was involved in a controversy that led to his temporary suspension. A local vagrant by the name of Tim Shea who presented ill to the police station was arrested and sentenced by Bligh to six months jail. Mr. Shea died while being transported on an open dray to Maryborough, with multiple bruisings and his tongue bitten through later being observed on his body. Bligh was to be transferred to Clermont for his actions but his powerful family connections in Brisbane prevented this. He later transferred to the gold mining towns of Gympie and Kilkivan.

== Death and legacy ==
Bligh remained as a police magistrate in Gympie until his death in 1880 at the relatively young age of 46. As a result of the kick to the face from the horse in Rockhampton, Bligh lost the sight in one eye and had chronic insomnia issues. He died of an overdose of chloral hydrate at his home in Gympie.

Bligh was widower when he died and had several children. A daughter, Lucy, later married Bligh's nephew, John Bligh Nutting, who had also served in Queensland as an officer in the Native Police.

Bligh Street in Gympie is likely to have been named after him and given both Gympie and the site of the Yabba Native Police barracks are nearby, the Bligh Street in Kilkivan is also very likely to have been named in his honour.
