= Natal Downs =

Pastoral lease in Queensland

Coordinates: 20.95°S 145.892°E

Location in Queensland

Natal Downs Station is a pastoral lease that operates as a cattle station in Queensland.

The property is situated approximately 110 kilometres (68 mi) south of Charters Towers and 205 kilometres (127 mi) west of Collinsville. It adjoins Longton and Narellan Stations along the Cape River.

The property occupies an area of 518 square kilometres (200 sq mi) and has a carrying capacity of about 12,000 head of cattle. The land is composed of open black soil plains covered with Mitchell and buffel grass, open forest and flooded coolabah flats that have been divided into 29 paddocks.

First taken up in September 1862 by a partnership between Kellet and Moffatt for £100 for 200 square miles, they failed to pay the fee and forfeited the claim. The following year Kellett reapplied for the run, now 264 square miles at a fee of £130.40. He soon transferred the licence to John De Villiers Lamb and Charles Parbury. The station was listed for sale in March 1866 and it passed into the ownership of William Chatfield Jnr. and Michael Miles.

In 1873 the station was sold to Messrs Bundock and Hays with 10,800 sheep, and 2,300 cattle for £13,250. They sold a portion of the station, along with all of the sheep, less than three weeks later. Ownership was later transferred to Bundock's son, C.W. Bundock, who took on P Salmon as a partner. In February 1937 the station was sold on behalf of Salmon and Bundock following Bundock's death. The station at that time comprised around 605 square miles (387,200 acres, 1,566 square kilometres), the purchaser was Edward Hill of Wyandra.

In 2008 the aggregation of Natal Downs, Longton and Narellan were placed on the market by the Camm Agricultural Group. David and Judy Camm had first moved to the station in the early 1980s. Collectively the properties occupy nearly one million acres and carry a herd of 33,000 head of cattle. The aggregation was sold in 2017 to the Rural Funds Group for $53 million. Under the terms of the acquisition the properties were to be leased back to the Camm Group who would continue to manage the properties for ten years.

== See also ==
- List of ranches and stations
