= Richard Purvis Marshall =

Richard Purvis Marshall (3 April 1818 – 15 August 1872) was a British pastoral squatter and high ranking Native Police officer in the colonies of New South Wales and Queensland. He was co-founder of the Gundi Windi cattle and sheep run which later evolved into the town of Goondiwindi. He was appointed to the Native Police in 1850 and became Commandant of the force in 1855. He retired from the Native Police in 1856 and held various Justice of the Peace and police magistrate roles in Goondiwindi until his death in 1872.

== Early life ==
Richard Purvis Marshall was born in Hatherleigh, Devon, England in 1818. His father was Lieutenant Sampson B. Marshall of the Royal Navy and his mother was Mary Ann King. Sampson Marshall served on the navy ship Diadem during the War of 1812 and was severely wounded at the Battle of Baltimore in 1814. He received a pension and was retired from service.

The Marshall family emigrated to New South Wales on the David Scott, arriving in Sydney in 1834, although it appears Richard remained in England until a later date. Sampson Marshall received a land grant of 640 acres at Jerry's Plains in the Hunter Valley and later moved his family to Rosebrook near Maitland in 1840.

== Gundi Windi ==
In the late 1840s Richard Purvis Marshall in partnership with his brother Sampson Yeoval Marshall established the Gundi Windi pastoral station on the MacIntyre River along the northern frontier of the colony of New South Wales. This area straddled indigenous Bigambul and Gamilarai territory and armed opposition to British colonisation was fierce. Other new runs in the region faced similar resistance and conflict resulted in numerous deaths on either side. The invading armed British settlers augmented with constables under the command of Commissioner Richard John Bligh from Warialda were unable to defeat the Aboriginals and as result some squatting leases were abandoned.

Augustus Morris, who held the Callandoon lease adjoining Gundi Windi was also a politician in the colonial New South Wales government. He recognised the need for a strong paramilitary force to enforce British control in the MacIntyre River region and recommended legislation to set up a Native Police to be deployed in the area. In 1848, funds were set aside by the New South Wales government for this purpose and by mid 1849, fourteen aboriginal troopers from the Deniliquin region in the south of the colony were sent to the MacIntyre under the command of Frederick Walker.

This force rapidly extinguished Aboriginal resistance in the region in a number of skirmishes including those at Carbucky, Beeboo and along the Severn River, where the indigenous groups "suffered so severely" in their defeats. When Frederick Walker and his troopers were to leave to patrol and pacify the Condamine River region to the north, the settlers of the MacIntyre, including Richard Purvis Marshall, wrote a letter to the government demanding a continuation of the protection given by the Native Police in their area.

== Lieutenant in the Native Police ==
With the expansion of the Native Police, Richard Purvis Marshall was appointed on 5 January 1850 as Lieutenant of the 1st Division. He was in command of 10 troopers to patrol the MacIntyre and Condamine regions. Almost immediately, Commandant Walker left on a recruiting drive in the southern districts leaving Marshall as highest-ranking officer of the force in the area. Marshall directed a number of punitive expeditions and summary executions against aboriginal people in 1850 including the execution of "Nobody" and the shootings at Wallann station. Further missions resulted in aboriginals being killed at Booranga and there was a large "dispersal" at Copranoranbilla lagoon, where Marshall divided his troopers along each side to entrap an indigenous camp.

In 1851, Marshall's 1st Division was deployed to the Burnett and Wide Bay regions where missions extended across a number of pastoral stations including Toomcul, Widgee and Rawbelle. At the end of this year, the report on the activities of Marshall's division was sent to Governor Fitzroy which invoked the response that "a great many blacks are reported as having been killed by the Police..these acts of severity..have been unavoidable."

== Commandant of the Native Police ==
Marshall was appointed acting Commandant in mid 1854 after the suspension of Frederick Walker. He was officially appointed Commandant in 1855, but due to complaining about poor funding of the force he was dismissed soon after. However, Marshall was allowed to continue as an unpaid officer in the Native Police until early 1856.

== Magistrate roles in Goondiwindi ==
After leaving the Native Police, Marshall held various Justice of the Peace and regular police magistrate roles in the Goondiwindi locality. He and his brother sold out of the Gundi Windi station in 1870.

== Death and legacy ==
Richard Purvis Marshall died on 15 August 1872 at his home "Corcoran" in Goondiwindi due to a chronic urinary tract infection. He was interred on the property. Marshall married twice and had several children. The main street in Goondiwindi, Marshall St, is named after him and his brothers.
