= Iman (given name) =

Iman is a given name found in many cultures, that can be both masculine and feminine. Variations of spelling include Eman, Emon, and Imaan.

In Islamic cultures, the name Iman (variously spelled Eman, Imaan, Imane) comes from the Arabic word meaning 'faith' or 'belief'.

== People with the name ==
=== Men ===
- Iman Afsarian (born 1974), Iranian painter
- Iman Alami (born 1968), Iranian footballer
- Iman Aldresy, Libyan internet personality.
- Iman Aminlari (born 1979), Iranian architect
- Imman Annachi (born 1968), Tamil film actor and television presenter
- Iman Basafa (born 1992), Iranian footballer
- Iman Crosson (born 1982), American actor and YouTube personality
- Iman Willem Falck (1736–1785), Dutch colonial governor
- Iman Dozy (1887–1957), Dutch footballer
- Eman Fiala (1899–1970), Czech actor and composer
- Imaan Hadchiti, Lebanese-Australian comedian and actor
- Iman Hakim (born 2002), Singaporean footballer
- Iman Budi Hernandi (born 1993), Indonesian footballer
- Iman Heydari (born 1983), Iranian footballer
- Iman Jamali (born 1991), Iranian-Hungarian handball player
- Iman Jordan (born 1980), American singer-songwriter
- Eman Kellam (born 1997), English actor and YouTuber
- Iman Kiani (born 1988), Iranian footballer
- Iman Maleki (born 1976), Iranian painter
- Eman Markovic (born 1999), Norwegian footballer
- Iman Marshall (born 1997), American football player
- Iman Mobali (born 1982), Iranian footballer and coach
- Iman Mousavi (born 1989), Iranian footballer
- Eman Bacosa Pacquiao (born 2004), Filipino professional boxer
- Iman Razaghirad (born 1978), Iranian footballer
- Iman Rezai (born 1981), Iranian artist
- Iman Sadeghi (born 1992), Iranian footballer
- Iman Salimi (born 1996), Iranian footballer
- Iman Sanchooli (born 1993), Iranian karateka
- Iman Budhi Santosa (1948–2020), Indonesian writer and poet
- Iman Shirazi (born 1992), Iranian footballer
- Iman Shumpert (born 1990), American basketball player
- Iman Xin Chemjong (1904–1975), Limbu historian
- Iman Yehia (born 1954), Egyptian physician and writer
- Iman Zakizadeh (born 1996), Iranian footballer
- Iman Zandi (born 1981), Iranian basketball player

=== Women ===
- Iman (model) (born 1955), Somali fashion model, actress and entrepreneur
- Iman al-Bugha, university professor of fiqh who joined ISIS
- Iman al-Ghuri, Syrian actress (died 2025)
- Eman Ahmed Abd El Aty (1980–2017), second heaviest woman ever recorded
- Iman Abuzeid, Sudanese-American healthcare entrepreneur
- Iman Ali (born 1980), Pakistani actress, model and singer
- Iman al-Asadi (born 1964), Iraqi politician
- Eman El-Asy (born 1985), Egyptian actress
- Iman Barlow (born 1993), English kickboxer and muay thai fighter
- Iman Benson (born 2000), American actress
- Iman Chakraborty (born 1989), Indian singer
- Iman Elman (born 1992), Somali-Canadian military officer
- Eman Gaber (born 1989), Egyptian fencer
- Eman El Gammal, Egyptian fencer
- Eman Al-Ghamidi, Saudi politician
- Eman Ghoneim, Egyptian-American geologist
- Iman Darweesh Al Hams (1991–2004), Palestinian schoolgirl killed in the Gaza Strip
- Iman Humaydan Younes (born 1956), Lebanese writer and researcher
- Iman Issa (born 1979), Egyptian artist
- Iman Essa Jasim (born 1997), Bahraini sprinter
- Imane Khalifeh (1955–1995), Lebanese educator and peace activist
- Iman Khatib-Yasin (born 1964), Israeli social worker and politician
- Eman Lam (born 1982), Hong Kong singer-songwriter
- Eman Lam (dancer), Hong Kong dancer, singer, comedian and painter
- Iman Mersal (born 1966), Egyptian women's poet
- Iman Meskini (born 1997), Norwegian actress
- Iman Mutlaq, Jordanian businesswoman and activist
- Eman al-Nafjan, Saudi Arabian blogger and activist
- Iman al-Obeidi, Libyan law student
- Iman Pahlavi (born 1993), 2nd daughter of Reza Pahlavi
- Iman Perez (born 1999), French model and actress
- Iman al-Qahtani, Saudi Arabian journalist and activist
- Iman Hasan Al-Rufaye (born 1982), Iraqi chess player
- Iman Al Sayed (born 1984), Palestinian artist
- Iman Shahoud (born 1963), Syrian judge and activist
- Eman Sharobeem, Egyptian-Australian women's right activist
- Eman Suleman (born 1992), Pakistani model and actress
- Princess Iman bint Al Abdullah (born 1996), Jordanian royal, daughter and second child of King Abdullah II and Queen Rania
- Princess Iman bint Al Hussein (born 1983), Jordanian royal, daughter of King Hussein and Queen Noor
- Iman Vellani (born 2002), Canadian actress
- Iman Verjee, Kenyan author
- Eman Al Yousuf (born 1987), Emirati writer and chemical engineer

== See also ==
- Iman
- Iman (surname)
- Imane
- Faith (given name)
- Vera (given name)
