= Eman =

Eman may refer to:

== People ==
=== Given name ===
- Eman AlAjlan, Saudi Arabian fashion designer
- Eman El-Asy, Egyptian actress
- Eman Bacosa Pacquiao, Filipino boxer
- Eman Esfandi, American actor
- Eman Fiala, Czech film actor and composer
- Eman Gaber, Egyptian fencer
- Eman El Gammal, Egyptian fencer
- Eman Al-Ghamidi, Saudi politician
- Eman Ghoneim, Egyptian/American geomorphologist
- Eman Hassan, Egyptian footballer
- Eman Kellam, Nigerian-British comedian, media personality and television host
- Eman Kiriakou, American producer and musician
- Eman Košpo, Bosnian/Swiss footballer
- Eman Lacaba, Filipino writer and activist
- Eman Lam, Hong Kong singer and songwriter
- Eman Lam (dancer), Hong Kong dancer, singer, comedian and painter
- Eman Markovic, Norwegian footballer
- Eman al-Nafjan, Saudi Arabian blogger and women's rights activist
- Eman Naghavi, American football coach
- Eman Quotah, Arab-American novelist
- Eman Sharobeem, Egyptian-Australian women's rights activist
- Eman Sulaeman, Indonesian cultural scholar, author, and actor
- Eman Suleman, Pakistani model and actress
- Eman Waseem, Pakistani politician
- Eman Al Yousuf, Emirati writer
- George Eman Vaillant, American psychiatrist
- George Van Eman Lawrence, American politician

=== Surname ===
- Anouk Eman, Aruban psychologist, swimmer, model and beauty pageant titleholder
- Diet Eman, Dutch resistance worker during World War II
- Henny Eman, Aruban politician
- Henny Eman (born 1887), Aruban politician
- Mike Eman, Aruban politician
- Samigue Eman, Filipino basketball player

== Places ==
- Emån, a river in Sweden
- Eman, Akwa Ibom, a village in Nigeria
- Eman Ikot Ebo, a village in Nigeria
- Eman Ukpa, a village in Nigeria
- Saint-Éman, a commune in France

== Other ==
- Eman language, a Tivoid language of Cameroon

== See also ==
- Iman
