= Beilba =

19th c. Indigenous Australian resistance leader

Beilba (c.1825 – March 1866), sometimes referred to as Beilbah or Bielbah, was an Indigenous Australian resistance fighter from the Expedition Range area of what is now known as Queensland. He became famous for being a leader in the Hornet Bank massacre of 1857, where Aboriginal forces killed 11 British settlers.

== Early life ==
Not much is known about Beilba's upbringing, but it is believed that he was a member of either the Kongabula or Yiman people of the upper Dawson River region of central Queensland. According to the colonist Pollet Cardew, Beilba as a young man had partaken in raids against British settlers at Mount Abundance and Dulacca in 1848 and 1849. He escaped being shot by the Native Police in follow-up punitive expeditions. Cardew also maintained that since 1854, Beilba had been involved in the killings of shepherds in the upper Dawson River region.

== Hornet Bank massacre ==
By the mid 1850s, Beilba had become closely associated with the Yiman people of the upper Dawson River. The Fraser family from the Hornet Bank property (established on Yiman land in 1853), had persecuted the Yiman for years, killing their men, raping their women, poisoning them and taking their land. In October 1857, the Yiman, with the assistance of Beilba, several former Native Police troopers and an Aboriginal servant from the Hornet Bank household named Baulie, decided to take revenge on the Frasers.

They attacked the homestead in the early hours of 27 October 1857, killing eight members of the Fraser family, their tutor and two stockmen. They raped the Fraser matriarch and her older girls before killing them. The homestead was then ransacked and Beilba and the Yiman then made off with around a hundred sheep.

== Subsequent conflict ==
Follow up punitive raids and extrajudicial massacres of Aboriginal people in the region by the Native Police and armed settlers were swift. Beilba escaped these raids, which were wide-ranging and continued for months after the Hornet Bank killings. Somewhere between 150 and 400 Indigenous people were killed in these raids.

For the next few years, Beilba appears to have mostly retreated into the rugged isolation of the Expedition Range with a number of Aboriginal warriors and survivors. In March 1860, Beilba with a group of these people were sighted on the plains near Yuleba to the south of the range. A local detachment of the Native Police under Second Lieutenant Frederick Carr was called in engage with this group. An hour long battle ensued with the Native Police using their modern firearms against the spears and nulla-nullas of the Aborigines. Carr and several troopers were wounded, but in the end the police were victorious. Beilba was able to escape with wounds, but at least 15 others of his group were killed, including Baulie who was also a key part of the Hornet Bank raid.

== Later years, death and legacy ==
Beilba survived for another six years, appearing to be protected and receiving food hand-outs from Aboriginal workers on properties around the Condamine River. It seems he may have also been protected by at least one colonist in the region. Bounties of £25 and £50 were announced for his capture, dead or alive.

In March 1866, Beilba's luck ran out and he was captured and shot dead in the Maranoa Region by the Native Police detachment led by sub-inspector James M. Gilmour.

His name lives on by the locality of Beilba, Queensland, situated in the rugged parts of the Expedition Range where Beilba once hid out from the colonists.

== See also ==
List of Indigenous Australian historical figures
