= Hornet Bank massacre =

1857 killing of eleven British colonists by Indigenous Australians

Coordinates: 25°45′S 149°24′E

The Hornet Bank massacre was the killing of eleven British settlers, which included eight members of the Fraser family, by a group of mostly Yiman Indigenous Australians. The massacre occurred at about one or two o'clock in the morning of 27 October 1857 at Hornet Bank station on the upper Dawson River near Eurombah in central Queensland, Australia. It has been moderately estimated that 150 Aboriginal people were killed in subsequent punitive expeditions conducted by Native Police, private settler militias, and by William Fraser in or around Eurombah district. Indiscriminate shootings of "over 300" Aboriginal men, women, and children, however, were reportedly conducted by private punitive expedition some 400 kilometres eastward at various stations in the Wide Bay district alone. The result was the near-extermination of the entire Yiman tribe and language group by 1858; this claim was disputed, however, and descendants of this group have recently been recognised by the High Court of Australia to be the original custodians of the land surrounding the town of Taroom.

== Background ==
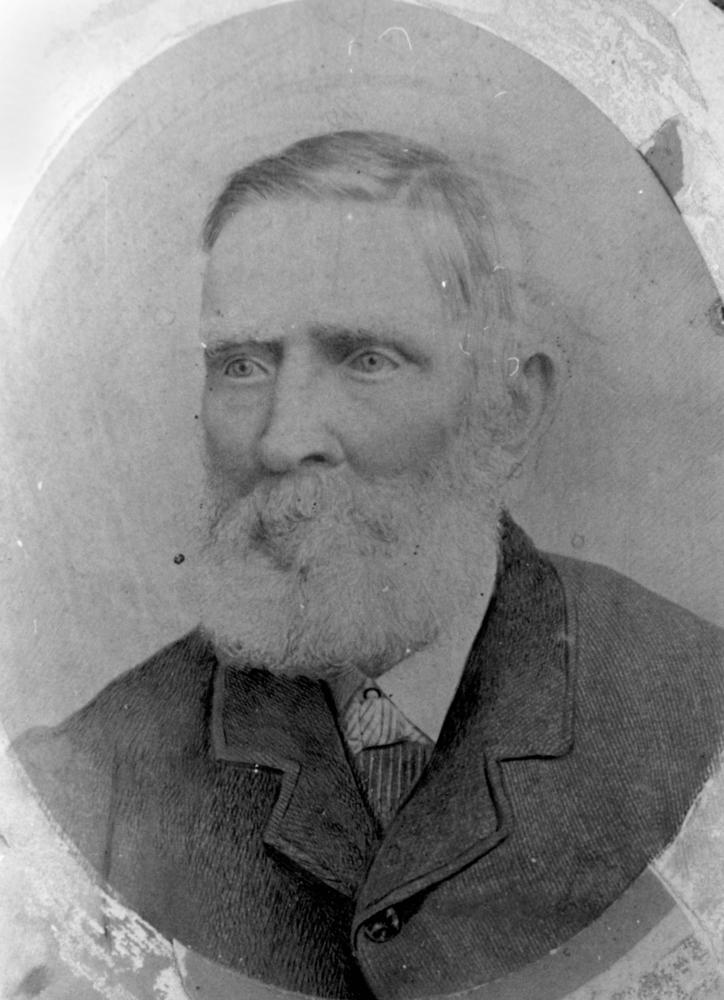
Andrew Scott, circa 1880

British colonists had begun to settle on Yiman land from 1847 following Ludwig Leichhardt's 1844–45 journey through the area on his expedition to find an overland route to Port Essington on the north coast of Australia.

The westernmost colonial settlement in the area was named Hornet Bank station, settled by Andrew Scott, who arrived in the early 1850s. In 1854, he leased the station to Scottish-born John Fraser, who took his wife, Martha, and a large family ranging in age from young children to the early twenties, to live in this area, isolated from other European settlements. Two years later, John Fraser died of dysentery while on a droving trip to Ipswich and his eldest son, William, then aged 23, took over management of the station in collaboration with the lessee, Andrew Scott.

The stations on the Dawson River were on the land of the Yiman people who bitterly resented the invasion of these European squatters, who were attempting permanent residency without permission or negotiation. With their flocks of sheep and herds of cattle, to the Europeans, the Yiman were an impediment to the expansion of their pastoral empires. Disrespect and then regular cruelty towards the Yiman people inflamed their already overwhelming sense of injustice, being barred access to their land. They made the surrounding country dangerous for the European migrants. Shepherds in boundary huts were attacked and killed and others feared leaving their wives and children unprotected. Although contemporary reports of the events stressed the bloodthirsty nature of the Yiman, contrasted with only kindness shown to them by the Fraser family, it has been claimed that the killing of the Frasers was in retaliation for the recent deaths of twelve Yiman, shot for spearing some cattle and for the deaths nine months earlier of an unknown number of Yiman who had been given a strychnine-laced Christmas pudding, allegedly by the Fraser family. It was also common knowledge in the region that the older Fraser boys would regularly abduct and rape young Yiman women and girls, to the point where their own mother wrote letters to others complaining about the sexual behaviour of her sons.

== Yiman raid on Hornet Bank ==
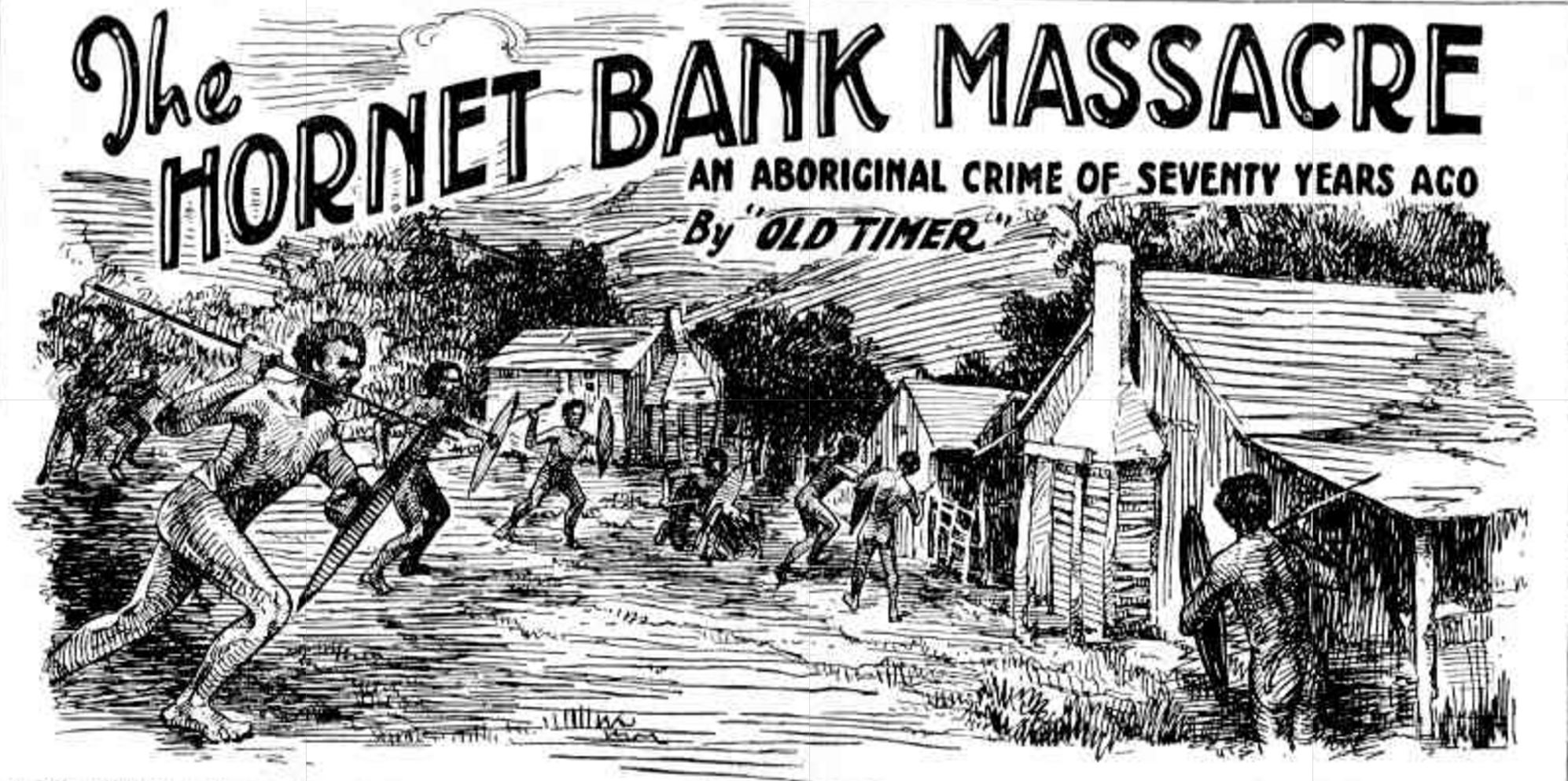
1925 sketch of the attack on the homestead

The Yiman people, at some stage during 1857, decided to take revenge on the Fraser family by organising a large attack on Hornet Bank. They were assisted in this by several Aboriginal men from outside their community. Firstly, a man named Beilba, who was possibly a Kongabula and who had a reputation for successful raids on the colonists to the south, became regarded as a leading figure in the Hornet Bank attack. Furthermore, at least two former troopers of the Native Police had joined with the Yiman, giving them practical experience of European methods of violence. Finally, there was Baulie, an Aboriginal servant of the Frasers, who turned against his masters and gave the Yiman insider knowledge of Hornet Bank.

The Yiman force attacked the Fraser homestead between one and two o'clock in the morning of 27 October 1857. Those in the house were Martha Fraser, eight of her nine children, Henry Neagle (their tutor), two White station hands who lived in a hut 1 km from the station, and Baulie, who hours before the attack had killed all the station dogs and then guided the raiders to where the settlers were sleeping. By all accounts, the Yiman initially intended to kidnap one of the Fraser women, but things got out of hand after the first Fraser to confront them was killed. The attackers killed the men, castrated Neagle, raped Martha Fraser and her two eldest daughters, clubbed them and the remaining children to death, and speared to death the two station hands.

The only survivor was fourteen-year-old Sylvester "West" Fraser who, after being hit on the head with a waddy, had fallen between the wall and bed. The Aboriginal raiders were distracted by the arrival of the two station hands, allowing Sylvester to crawl under his mattress and remain concealed. He later ran "without hat or boots and in a terribly bruised state" 12 miles (19 km) to nearby Cardin Station and raised the alarm. Station hands immediately formed a posse and located a large mob of Aboriginals sleeping some 10 miles (16 km) from the Fraser property; they "showed them no mercy".

=== Killed ===
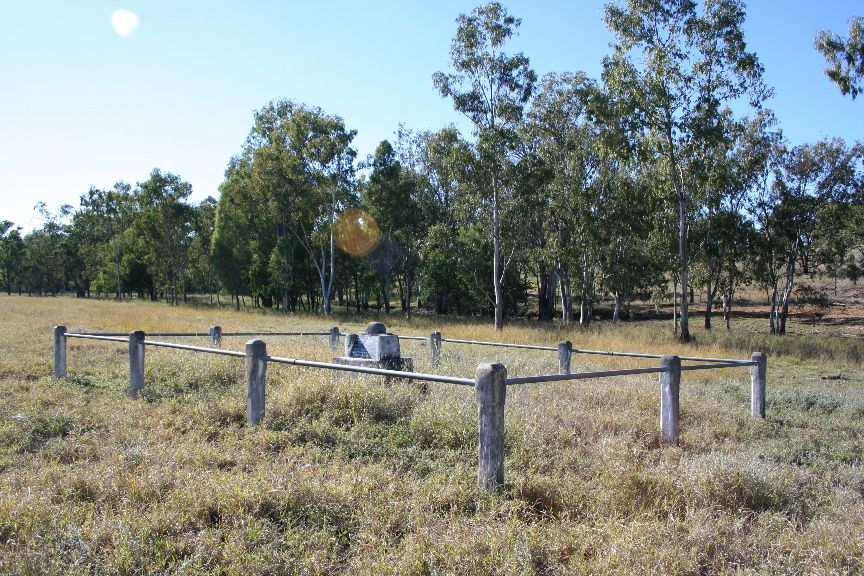
Fraser family grave site, 2008

The victims of the Hornet Bank attack, who were later buried on the property, included:

- Martha Fraser, aged 43 years
- John Fraser, aged 23
- Elizabeth Fraser, aged 19
- David Fraser, aged 16
- Mary Fraser, aged 11
- Jane Fraser, aged 9
- James Fraser, aged 6
- Charlotte Fraser, aged 3
- Henry Neagle (tutor), aged 27
- John Newman (shepherd), aged 30
- Bernangl (shepherd), aged 45

== Punitive missions and further conflict ==
=== Native Police ===
During the European colonisation of Australia, the main force eliminating Indigenous resistance to the settler acquisition of land was the Native Police. This colonial government-funded force consisted of white officers in charge of Aboriginal troopers from areas distant to their region of deployment. The method used by the Native Police to suppress resistance to European colonisation was known as "dispersal", which involved indiscriminate shooting and killing of Indigenous men, women, and children that were found in the associated frontier area.

After the Hornet Bank massacre, the first Native Police division to arrive on the scene was that of Lieutenant Walter Powell. He took his troopers in a westerly direction and found a group of Aboriginals of which he shot dead five. Powell enrolled the surviving Fraser brothers, William and Sylvester, as special constables for his second punitive mission and they shot dead a further nine people. 2nd-Lieutenants Moorhead and Carr of the Native Police arrived soon after with their troopers, killing around another thirteen Aboriginals. By December 1857, Powell had increased the number of troopers in his division to seventeen, which he put to use by conducting raids on peaceful "station blacks" at Taroom, killing five, including three native women, as they tried to flee. Powell with William Fraser and 2nd-Lieutenant R.G.Walker led another raid at Juandah, shooting dead another eleven Aboriginals. By April 1858, other divisions of Native Police led by Edric Norfolk Vaux Morisset, John Murray, John O'Connell Bligh, George Murray, and Charles Phibbs, had become active in the area, conducting raids of indiscriminate summary justice. Henry Gregory and his brother, the explorer A.C. Gregory, were also involved in the punitive expeditions as they were squatters in the area. In his memoirs, local pastoralist George Serocold wrote that a dozen local black men who were considered leaders in the region at that time were rounded up and then ordered to run through an open field. As they fled, they were shot dead by those who had ordered them to run.

In June 1858, the New South Wales Legislative Assembly appointed a select committee to inquire into the killings of Whites and Blacks that had taken place around the Dawson River region. The committee concluded that although the government should not "attempt to wage a war of extermination against the Aborigines, they are satisfied that there is no alternative but to carry matters through with a strong hand, and punish with necessary severity all future outrages" by Aboriginal people on the frontier. It was recommended that the Native Police force be strengthened and made more efficient to achieve this goal.

=== "The Browns" ===
George Serocold was also involved in the formation of a mounted vigilante death squad in response to the Hornet Bank massacre. The squad was called "The Browns" and consisted of Serocold, his property manager at Cockatoo station, Murray-Prior, Horton, Alfred Thomas, McArthur, Piggott, Ernest Davies, and three Aboriginal servants including Billy Hayes and Freddy. This group formed at Hawkwood station on the nearby Auburn River. They conducted shooting raids upon mostly innocent "station blacks" in this area during their six-week mission, including the perpetration of a massacre at Redbank station. Native Police also went through Redbank station three weeks afterwards, conducting another massacre on this property.

=== Frederick Walker's private militia ===
Despite, or perhaps because of, the sustained and severe punishment meted out by the government's Native Police, Aboriginal resistance in the immediate region continued with the killing of six station-hands in April 1858. Local settlers decided to augment the official Native Police divisions with a privately funded squad of armed black troopers under the leadership of ex-Native Police Commandant Frederick Walker. Walker was previously sacked from the force in 1854 for inebriation and embezzlement. He recruited Aboriginal troopers who had either deserted or quit the Native Police and conducted punitive patrols for the local landholders as far away as Roma.

=== William Fraser ===
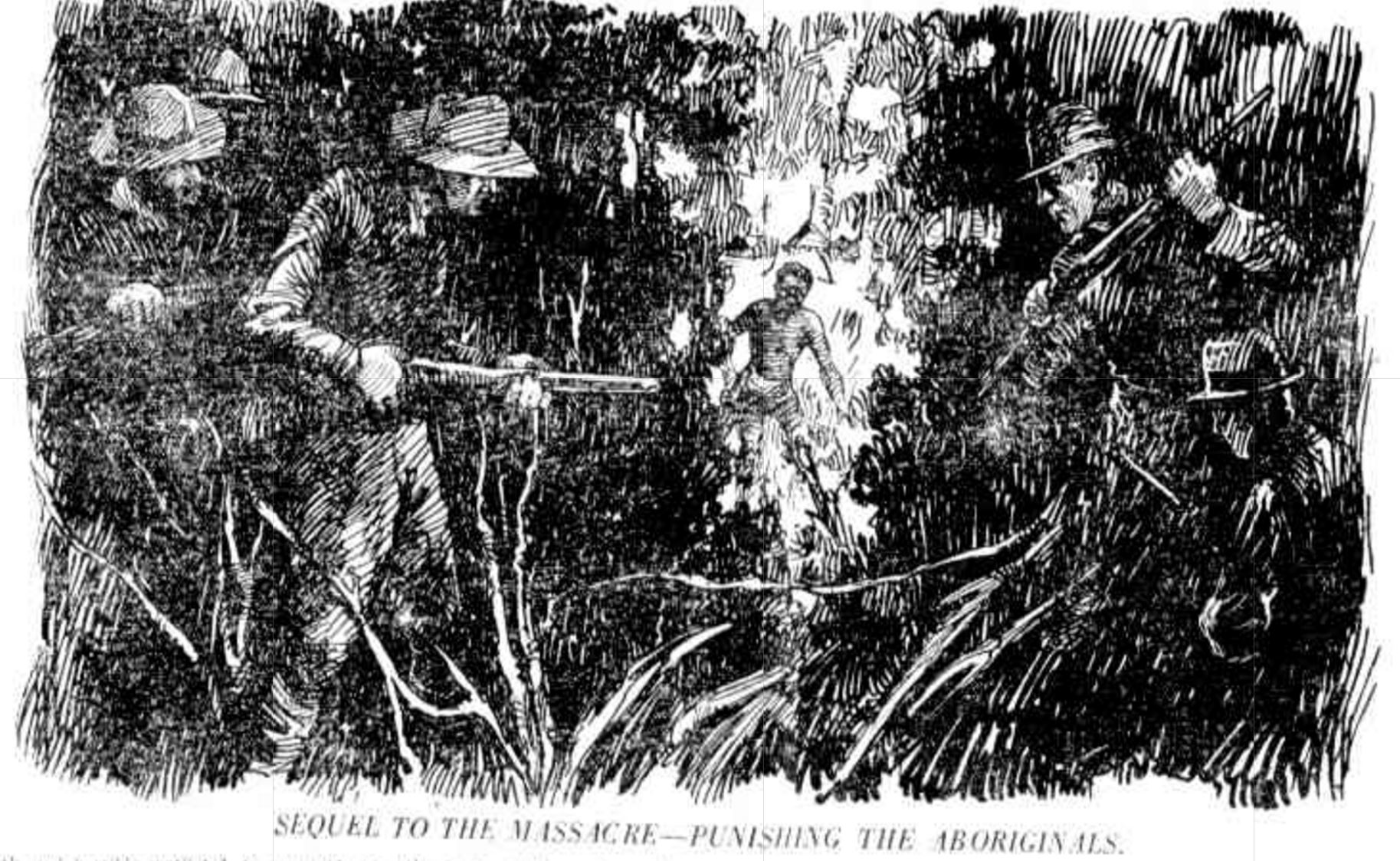
1925 sketch of the retaliation

The most ruthless avenger was William Fraser, who was away in Ipswich at the time of the massacre. His brother Sylvester rode to Ipswich to inform him of the massacre and the pair returned to Hornet Bank, covering the 320 miles (510 km) in three days with three changes of horses. Allowed to ride with the Native police, William Fraser had "every opportunity to assuage his grief through murder". He continued killing randomly wherever he found Aborigines. He shot an Aboriginal jockey at the racetrack in Taroom and after two Aboriginals accused of being involved in the massacre were found not guilty, he shot both dead as they left the Rockhampton courthouse. It was reported that after Fraser shot an Aboriginal woman in the main street of Toowoomba because he claimed she was wearing his mother's dress, two policemen spoke with him briefly before saluting and walking away. This incident reinforced a local belief that the government had given Fraser twelve months' immunity from prosecution, during which he was free to avenge the massacre of his family. In 1905, Fraser was asked if he had an authority, he replied "I never asked and never received such an authority but felt I was justified in doing so (the killings)."

On the banks of the Juandah lagoon, near Wandoan, there is a place called Fraser's Revenge, where according to the local settlers, a group of Aboriginals massacred by a posse led by Fraser are buried. Also at Wandoan, there was another incident reported by Frederick Walker to the attorney general in Brisbane that involved the massacring of Aboriginals at the magistrate's residence in that town. These Aboriginals had been found not guilty of involvement at Hornet Bank but were shot dead by local whites and buried nearby.

On 6 March 1867, Fraser became an officer in the Native Police and was posted to the barracks at Nebo, where he continued his campaign against Indigenous people. It was reported that in 1867, ten years after the massacre, sub-Inspector William Fraser and his troopers were tracking a small group of Iman women and children who had taken refuge at Mackenzie Station on the Fitzroy River. Informed that Fraser was approaching, Mrs Mackenzie hid the Aboriginals in her bedroom. Fraser demanded to search the house and did so but Mackenzie stood in front of the bedroom door and refused to allow him to search that room. Fraser left empty-handed after Mackenzie gave him "all the contents of her tongue."

William Fraser almost certainly killed over 100 members of the tribe, making him one of the worst and most prolific mass murderers in Australian history. Many more were killed by sympathetic squatters and the officers and troopers of the Native Police. In an article recounting the massacre, it was reported that the mere mention of Fraser's name by settlers was enough to avoid trouble when they faced "truculent natives."

== Aftermath ==
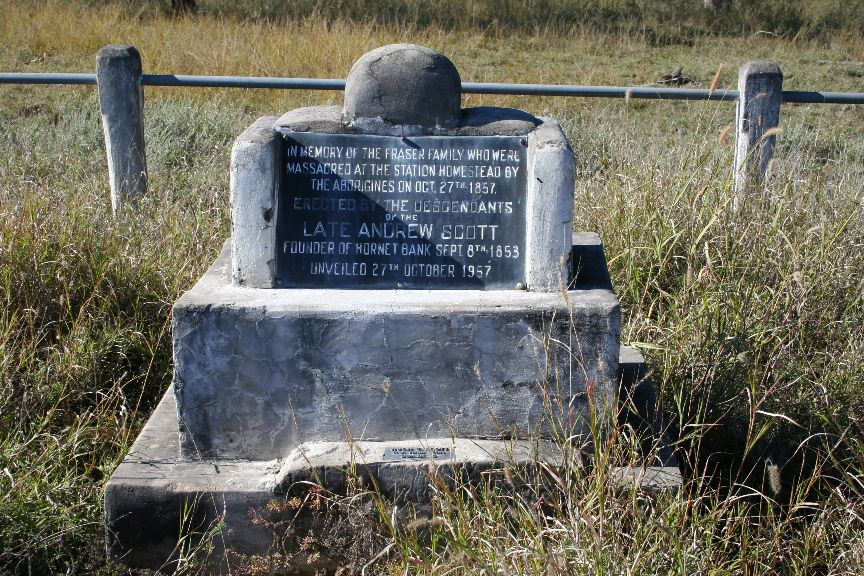
Heritage-listed memorial for the Fraser family, 2008

Exactly how many Yiman people died following Hornet Bank is unknown but is figured to be in the hundreds, with few Yiman surviving. Some fled to Maryborough (300 km east of Taroom), but even there they were unsafe. The police continued harassing them for a number of years after. Fraser's revenge campaign eventually resulted in the believed extermination of the Yiman tribe and language. This is most certainly not true due to some Yiman men, women, and children escaping and hiding further than any police officers searched. By March 1858, up to 300 members of the tribe had been killed. Although the Yiman people survived, not many actually live within the tribe's borders; they are most commonly found throughout the surrounding areas such as Rockhampton, Mount Morgan, Gladstone, Blackwater, and many more towns near and far. Public and police sympathy for Fraser was so high that he was never arrested for any of the killings and gained a reputation as a folk hero throughout Queensland.

A few of the main leaders of the Hornet Bank attack avoided being killed for some time. Baulie and Beilba, together with a number of Yiman, hid out in the rugged Expedition Range until March 1860, when they were discovered near Yuleba. A Native Police detachment under 2nd Lieutenant Frederick Carr was deployed to engage them. After a battle lasting an hour, around fifteen of the resistance fighters, including Baulie, were killed. Beilba escaped, albeit badly wounded. He survived for the next six years, before being captured and shot dead by Native Police sub-inspector James Gilmour.

Sylvester Fraser never recovered, either physically or mentally. He remained subject to fits, during which "blacks fled from him in alarm", despite him being harmless. It was reported that he died a broken man.

William Fraser died at the age of 83 in Mitchell, Queensland on 1 November 1914. Noting that he left behind two sons and 14 daughters, his obituary stated that "Any blacks that crossed Fraser's path for many years after [the massacre] got a particularly bad time; in fact, the name of Fraser was quite sufficient to strike fear and terror into their hearts."

In October 1957, to commemorate the centenary of the killings, a concrete memorial was erected on the grave site by Andrew Scott's descendants.

On 18 September 2008, the grave site and memorial were added to the Queensland Heritage Register.

== See also ==
- Wild Toby
- Gilburri
- List of massacres of Indigenous Australians
