= Inman (surname) =

Inman is a surname originating in England. It usually originates from the medieval English occupational word Innman, and describes an innkeeper. The origin is the pre-7th-century word inn, meaning a lodging place where alcoholic beverages were served, plus man, in this case a keeper or foreman. The first recording of the surname Inman is from the late 14th century, occupational surnames being among the first to be recorded but the last to be hereditary. They usually only became so when a son or sometimes a grandson in medieval England would follow their father into the same line of business. It has also been suggested that the surname derives from an Old English pre-7th-century personal name Ingemund, a compound of 'Ing', the name of a minor Norse god of fertility, plus mund, protection. Notable people with the surname include:

- Arthur Crew Inman (1895–1963), American poet
- Bobby Ray Inman (1931–2026), American admiral and intelligence officer
- Bradden Inman (b. 1991), Australian footballer
- Bradley Inman, American Internet entrepreneur
- Charles Inman (1810–1899), American politician
- Dontrelle Inman (born 1989), American football player
- Douglas Inman (1920–2016), American oceanographer
- Florence Elsie Inman (1891–1986), Canadian politician
- George H. Inman (died 2001), American politician
- Henry Inman (disambiguation), several people including
  - Henry Inman (Royal Navy officer) (1762–1809), British Royal Navy officer
  - Henry Inman (painter) (1801–1846), American painter
  - Henry Inman (police commander) (1816–1895), founder and commander of the South Australia Police
  - Henry Inman (U.S. Army officer and author) (1837-1899), U.S. soldier and author
  - Henry Inman (wrestler) (1886-1967), British wrestler
- Ida Mary Inman (1894–1985), American feminist, political activist, and writer
- Ira E. Inman (1868–1954), American farmer and politician
- Jack C. Inman (1925–2015), American politician
- Jeremy Inman, American voice actor
- Jerry Inman (1940–2024), American football player
- Jerry Buck Inman (b. 1970), American convicted murderer and sex offender
- Joe Inman (b. 1947), American golfer
- John Inman (1935–2007), English actor and singer
- John Inman (golfer) (b. 1962), American golfer and coach
- Josh Inman (b. 1980), American rower
- Matthew Inman (b. 1982), American cartoonist and creator of humor site The Oatmeal
- Melbourne Inman (1878–1951), British billiards player
- P. Inman (b. 1947), American poet
- Philip Inman, 1st Baron Inman (1892–1979), British politician
- Robert Inman (disambiguation)
- Samuel M. Inman (1843–1915), American merchant
- Scott Inman (b. 1978), American politician
- Stu Inman (1926–2007), American basketball player, coach, and executive
- William Inman (1825–1881) British ship-owner

== See also ==
- Iman (surname)
