= Baulie =

Indigenous Australian resistance leader

Baulie (c. 1835 – 7 March 1860), also known as Bally, Boney or Bahlee, was an Indigenous Australian resistance fighter. He is best known for being a leader in the 1857 Hornet Bank massacre of British settlers near Taroom, in what is now rural Queensland.

== Early contact with British colonists ==
Around the late 1840s or early 1850s, Baulie became associated with the British colonist Andrew Scott. Scott employed Baulie as a labourer and stockman on his pastoral properties in northern New South Wales and the Darling Downs. It is unclear if Baulie was from one of these areas or the other, but it is probable that when he started working for Scott he was an adolescent.

== Relocation to Hornet Bank ==
In 1853, Scott was looking to take up more land in the uncolonised regions north of the Darling Downs. With Baulie and several other of his men, he formed the Hornet Bank pastoral run in the upper Dawson River region of what is now Queensland. He forced the Indigenous Yiman people out from this area and established a homestead on one of their favourite camping sites near a lagoon. In 1854, Scott leased the property to the Fraser family.

Baulie assisted Scott and the Frasers at Hornet Bank, by this stage having learnt to communicate in English quite proficiently. He also managed over time to establish his own amicable contacts with the Yiman, who had mostly been forced into taking refuge in the nearby rugged Expedition Range to escape being shot by the colonists and their Native Police.

== Hornet Bank massacre ==
From 1854 to 1857, the Frasers of Hornet Bank became well known for mistreating Aboriginal people. Local Aboriginal men were shot either by the colonists or by the Native Police who were often temporarily camped at Hornet Bank. William, David and John Fraser, who were young men at this time, would regularly abduct and rape Yiman women. They would also shoot the Yiman's dogs and reportedly gave the Yiman people pudding laced with strychnine for Christmas in 1856 which resulted in many deaths.

As a result of years of this mistreatment, a revenge attack was planned by the Yiman upon the Frasers of Hornet Bank. Baulie appears also to have become angered by the actions of the Frasers and covertly worked with the Yiman to organise the attack. He had insider knowledge of Hornet Bank and was trusted by the Frasers, and therefore became a crucial part of the resistance operation.

In the early hours of 27 October 1857, approximately 100 Yiman assembled in the darkness around the homestead of Hornet Bank. Amongst them was another resistance leader named Beilba and at least two former Native Police troopers who had joined the Yiman. Baulie prepared the way for the Hornet Bank massacre by gathering the property's dogs and killing them before they could alert the Frasers. Soon after, Baulie led the Yiman in raiding the homestead. They killed eight members of the Fraser family (raping three of the females beforehand), the family's tutor and two stockmen. They plundered the property and took around 100 sheep before making off just before dawn.

== Reprisals ==
In the days and months following the Hornet Bank massacre, many punitive expeditions were organised by the colonists to inflict collective punishment on any Aboriginal people they found in the region. Native Police raids and attacks by armed settlers killed hundreds of Aborigines. Baulie managed to escape these and hid out for several years in the remote recesses of the Expedition Range with other warriors including Beilba.

== Battle with Native Police and death ==
In March 1860, Baulie with his contingent of warriors came down from the ranges and camped out near to the pastoral property of Bendemeer near Yuleba. They were quickly reported by the local colonists to the Native Police. A detachment of troopers under Second Lieutenant Frederick Carr were mobilised to Bendemeer where they engaged in an hour long battle with Baulie and his warriors.

The Aboriginal men, fighting only with spears and nulla-nullas, managed to wound Carr and several of his troopers. Carr heard Baulie during the battle encouraging his warriors to keep up the fight as the troopers were running out of cartridges. However, the Native Police were victorious in the end, leaving 15 Aboriginal warriors, including Baulie, dead.

== See also ==
- List of Indigenous Australian historical figures
