= Iman =

Iman, Imann, Imaan, Eman, Eiman, Imane, Emaan, or Imman may refer to:

== Places ==
- Iman, Iran, a village in Kalashi District, Kermanshah Province
- The Iman River, the former name of the Bolshaya Ussurka River, a tributary of the Ussuri River in Russia's Primorsky Krai
- Iman, the former name of Dalnerechensk, a city in Russia's Primorsky Krai

== Other uses ==
- Iman people, an ethnic group of Australia
- Iman language, a language of Australia
- Iman (Islam), Islamic faith of a believer in Islam
- Inner-City Muslim Action Network, a Muslim charity organization based in Chicago, Illinois
- Iman (film), a 2023 Nigerian drama film
- I-Man, a 1986 science-fiction television movie produced by Disney
- "Imán (Two of Us)", a 2024 song by María Becerra

== People with the name ==
- Iman (given name)
- Iman (surname)
- Iman (model) (born 1955), Somali-American fashion model, actress and entrepreneur
- Iman (singer) (born 1980), American singer-songwriter

== See also ==
- Imam (disambiguation)
- Imani (disambiguation)
- Yiman (disambiguation)
- Amin (disambiguation)
- Amina (disambiguation)
