= Nullah (disambiguation) =

A nullah is a narrow valley.

Nullah or Nulla may also refer to:

- Cronulla, New South Wales, nickname Nulla.
- Zero, nulla, nullo, or the letter N as an unofficial Roman numeral (from the Latin word nulla, meaning "none", "nothing", or the number zero).
- Nulla nulla or nullah, alternative name for a waddy, an Australian Aboriginal weapon.
