= Imane =

Imane (Arabic: إيمان) is a unisex given name. Notable people with the given name include:

- Imane Khalifeh (1955–1995), Lebanese educator and peace activist
- Imane Khelif (born 1999), Algerian boxer
- Imane Merga (born 1988), Ethiopian long-distance runner
- Imane Anys (born 1996), better known as Pokimane, Moroccan-Canadian Twitch streamer, YouTube personality

== See also ==
- Iman (given name)
