= Dozy =

Dozy is a Dutch surname, it may refer to:

- Frans Dozy (1807–1856), bryologist
- Iman Dozy (1887–1957), Dutch football player
- Jean Jacques Dozy (1908–2004), Dutch geologist who discovered the Ertsberg in New Guinea
- Reinhart Dozy (1820–1883), Dutch scholar of Arabic
- Trevor Ward-Davies (1944–2015), bass guitarist in the 1960s British band Dave Dee, Dozy, Beaky, Mick & Tich
