= Yiman =

Yiman may refer to:

- Yiman people, an ethnic group of Australia
- Yiman language, a language of Australia
- Dalnerechensk, formerly known as Yiman, a town in eastern Russia
- a Chinese given name, people with this name include:
  - Zhang Yiman, badminton player
  - Zhao Yiman, resistance fighter

== See also ==
- Yimen
- Iman (disambiguation)
