= Eman Lam (disambiguation) =

Eman Lam may refer to:

- Eman Lam, Hong Kong singer and songwriter
- Eman Lam (dancer), Hong Kong dancer, singer, comedian and painter
