= Emam =

Emam may refer to:

- Imam, an Islamic leadership position
- Emam (name), a surname, also for people with the surname "Imam"
- Emam, Gilan, a village in Gilan Province, Iran
- Emam Safi, a village in Khuzestan Province, Iran
- Emam 3, a village in Khuzestan Province, Iran
- Emam, Zanjan, a village in Zanjan Province, Iran
- Emam Rural District, in Kurdistan Province, Iran
- Imam Tawhidi (born 1982/83), an Indian Australian man

== See also ==
- Emam is a common element in Iranian place names; see
