= Emam (name) =

Emam or Imam is a surname. Notable people with the surname include:

- Adel Emam (born 1940), Egyptian actor
- Amir Imam (born 1990), American boxer
- Hamada Emam (1943–2016), Egyptian footballer, son of Yehia Emam
- Hazem Emam (born 1975), Egyptian footballer, son of Hamada Emam
- Hazem Mohamed Emam (born 1988), Egyptian footballer
- Khaled El Emam, Canadian businessman and academic
- Mohamed Emam (born 1984), Egyptian actor, son of Adel Emam and younger brother of Ramy Emam
- Ramy Emam (born 1974), Egyptian director, son of Adel Emam and elder brother of Mohamed Emam
- Sharjeel Imam (born 1988), Indian student activist
- Silvana Imam (born 1986), Swedish rapper
- Tarek Emam (born 1977), Egyptian writer
- Yehia Emam (1919–1997), Egyptian footballer
