= Eman AlAjlan =

Saudi Arabian fashion designer

Eman Abdul Rahman AlAjlan
- Born: 1989 (age 36–37); Riyadh
- Occupation: Fashion Designer
- Website: https://emanalajlan.co/

Eman AlAjlan (Arabic: إيمان العجلان) is a Saudi Arabian fashion designer.

== Life and career ==
Eman AlAjlan used to design dresses herself for parties and events during her childhood days. After completing her graduation, she opened her first ever fashion house in Riyadh, Saudi Arabia. She runs a fashion business as fashion designer.

She has designed a number of dresses for numerous international festivals and events. She has designed gown for the American actress Eva Longoria for the Cannes Festival Chopard Trophy dinner in May 2024. She has also designed the dress for the model Grace Elizabeth at the Top Gun: Maverick red carpet event in 2022.

In 2023, AlAjlan designed a gown for the model Jasmine Tookes for the Cannes Festival red carpet. AlAjlan also showed her presence at the FIFA World Cup 2022 finale in Qatar. She participated in designing the dress for Moroccan singer/artist Manal Benchlikha at the ceremony. She is also known for working with international names such as Catrinel Marlon, Leomie Anderson, Romee Strijd, and Sonam Kapoor.
