= Silbo Gomero =

Whistled language

- el silbo
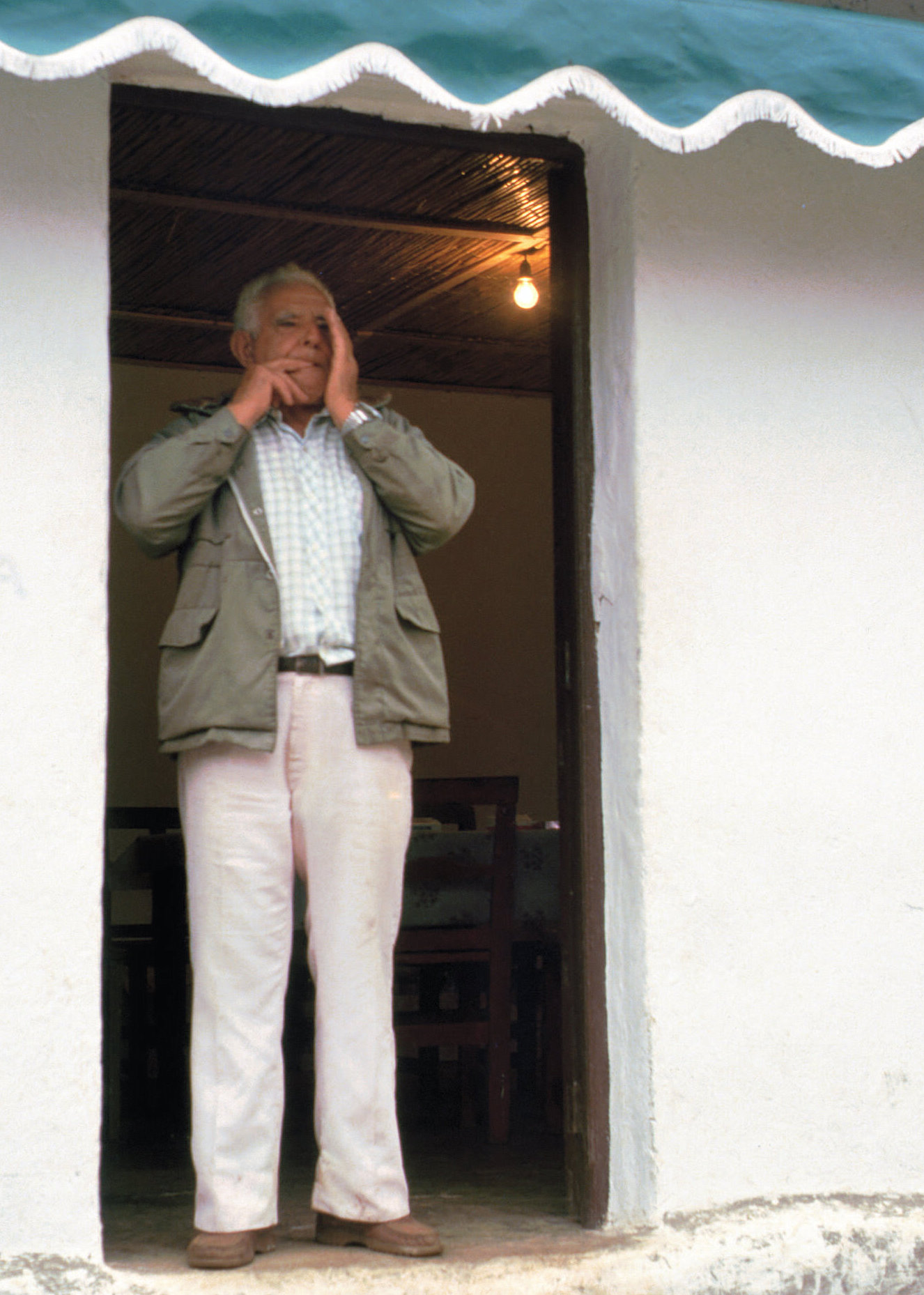
- Native to: Spain
- Region: La Gomera, Canary Islands
- Native speakers: (undated figure of 22,000)
- Language family: Indo-European: Italic; Latino-Faliscan; Latin; Romance; Italo-Western; Western Romance; Gallo-Iberian; Ibero-Romance; West Iberian; Castilian; Spanish; Canarian Spanish; Silbo Gomero

Language codes
- ISO 639-3: –
- Glottolog: None

Whistled language of the island of La Gomera (Canary Islands), the Silbo Gomero
- UNESCO Intangible Cultural Heritage
- Country: Spain
- Reference: 00172
- Region: Europe and North America

Inscription history
- Inscription: 2009 (4th session)
- List: Representative

Silbo Gomero (Spanish: silbo gomero [ˈsilβo ɣoˈmeɾo], "Gomeran whistle"), also known as el silbo ("the whistle"), is a whistled register of Spanish that is used by inhabitants of La Gomera, in the Canary Islands. It was historically used to communicate across the deep ravines and narrow valleys that radiate through the island and enabled messages to be exchanged over a distance of up to five kilometres. Its loudness causes Silbo Gomero to be generally used for public communication. Messages that are conveyed range from event invitations to public information advisories. A speaker of Silbo Gomero is sometimes called a silbador ("whistler").

Silbo Gomero is a transposition of Spanish from speech to whistling. The spoken–whistled phoneme substitution emulates Spanish phonology through a reduced set of whistled phonemes. In 2009, UNESCO declared it a Masterpiece of the Oral and Intangible Heritage of Humanity.

== History ==
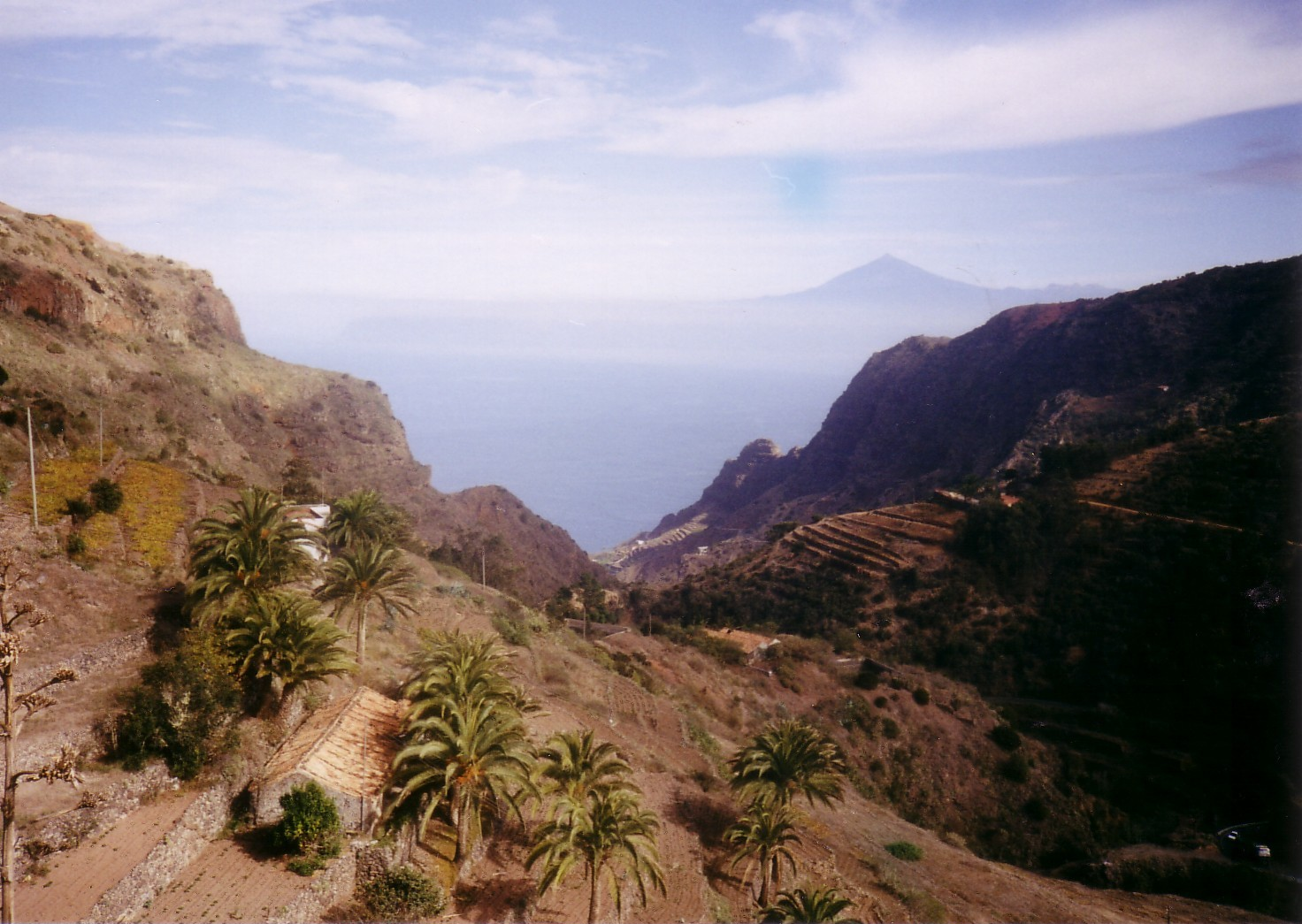
The narrow valleys of La Gomera.

Little is known of the original Guanche language or the languages of the Canary Islands, but it is assumed that their phonological system must have been simple enough to allow an efficient whistled language. It was used by the island's original inhabitants, the Guanches. The whistled language existed before the arrival of Spanish settlers and was also spoken on El Hierro, Tenerife and Gran Canaria. Silbo was adapted to Spanish during the Spanish settlement in the 16th century and was widely spoken throughout into the 17th century. In 1976, Silbo barely remained on El Hierro, where it had flourished at the end of the 19th century. Use of the language declined in the 1950s, one factor being the economic decline, which led many speakers to move away to seek better jobs. Technological developments such as the telephone played a part in reducing the practicality and utility of the language. The language's earlier survival had been caused by its role in overcoming distance and terrain, in addition to the ease with which it is learned by native speakers. Most significantly, from the 1960s to 1980s, many people turned away from agriculture and so many middle-class families did not want their children to speak the language, as it was negatively associated with the rural peasants.

In the late 1990s, language revitalization efforts began, and initiatives from within the community started. By 1999, the revitalization of Silbo Gomero was furthered by education policies and other legislative measures. It now has official protection as an example of intangible cultural heritage.

== Speakers ==
Many people in La Gomera speak Silbo Gomero, but their expression of the language deviates in minor ways that show the speaker's origins. According to a 2009 UNESCO report, all of La Gomera's inhabitants understand the language, but only those born before 1950 and the younger generations who attended school since 1999 can speak it. Those born before 1950 were taught the language by their elders in their homes, and those who attended or are attending school since 1999 were taught it formally in school. Those born between 1950 and 1980 understand the language but are unable to speak it, as it was hardly used and negatively viewed during their time of language acquisition.

== Revitalization ==
When this medium of communication was endangered in the late 20th century, revitalization efforts were generated at both community level and governmental level. A combination of initiatives from the La Gomeran community and policies implemented by the authorities saw Silbo Gomero being revitalized and maintained as a cultural asset. These revitalization efforts were well-documented by UNESCO as part of the proceedings for the selection of the 2009 Representative List of the Intangible Cultural Heritage of Humanity.

=== Community initiatives ===
In a bid to preserve Silbo Gomero for the island's youth, expert whistlers sought to obtain permission to teach the language on a free and voluntary basis at a dedicated centre. The initiative by the senior islanders garnered encouraging responses, with parent-teacher associations extending it to all schools. The first of many revitalization measures was thus adopted at the grassroots level not by public or private entities, which reflected the locals' attitude toward Silbo Gomero. Education policies implemented later were inspired as such, and revitalization began at the grassroots and escalated to the highest government bodies.

=== Government policies ===
On 26 June 1997, the Parliament of the Canary Islands approved a motion calling on the government to include Silbo Gomero as part of the school curriculum. Silbo Gomero then became a mandatory subject in primary and secondary education, as of July 1999. The provincial government was supportive in its implementation of education policy and also the establishment of a formalized Silbo Gomero curriculum through the publication of El Silbo Gomero, Materiales didácticos (Educational Materials on the Silbo Gomero).

In addition to the compulsory learning of Silbo Gomero at the primary and secondary level, an Island School of Silbo Gomero was established for post-secondary students who wish to continue to train in Silbo Gomero until they become accredited professional instructors. Students of the Island School work to become capable of teaching Silbo Gomero not only to their fellow citizens, but also to tourists who visit La Gomera. This facilitates the sustainability of the revitalization and also works towards language maintenance.

Thereafter, the Ministry of Education, Universities, Culture and Sport of the Canary Islands developed a staff training plan in order to ensure that the elderly expert whistlers can be replaced in the near future by qualified professional teachers with relevant diplomas. This comprised the provision of training courses on proficiency in and the teaching of Silbo Gomero. The training plan was launched in 2007, with the participation of 18 teachers.

Besides the implementation of education policies, the authorities also sought to strengthen the corpus of Silbo Gomero by developing a project to digitize all recorded audio material. Local, national and worldwide distribution of documentaries on Silbo Gomero were also made. The government also raised the status of Silbo Gomero by selecting it via the National Historical Heritage Council to represent Spain in the nominations for inclusion on the 2009 Representative List of the Intangible Cultural Heritage of Humanity.

=== Cultural heritage ===
Members of the Gomeran community treasure Silbo Gomero as part of the island's identity and use the whistled language in traditional rituals and festivities on the island such as "bajadas", processions that are dedicated to the Virgin or the patron saints of the community.

On 15 March 1999, Silbo Gomero was declared as part of the historical ethnographic heritage of the Canary Islands. The annual celebration of "School Encounters with Silbo Gomero" was also inaugurated in La Gomera. In 2005, the monument to Silbo Gomero was inducted in Garajonay National Park.

=== Tourism ===
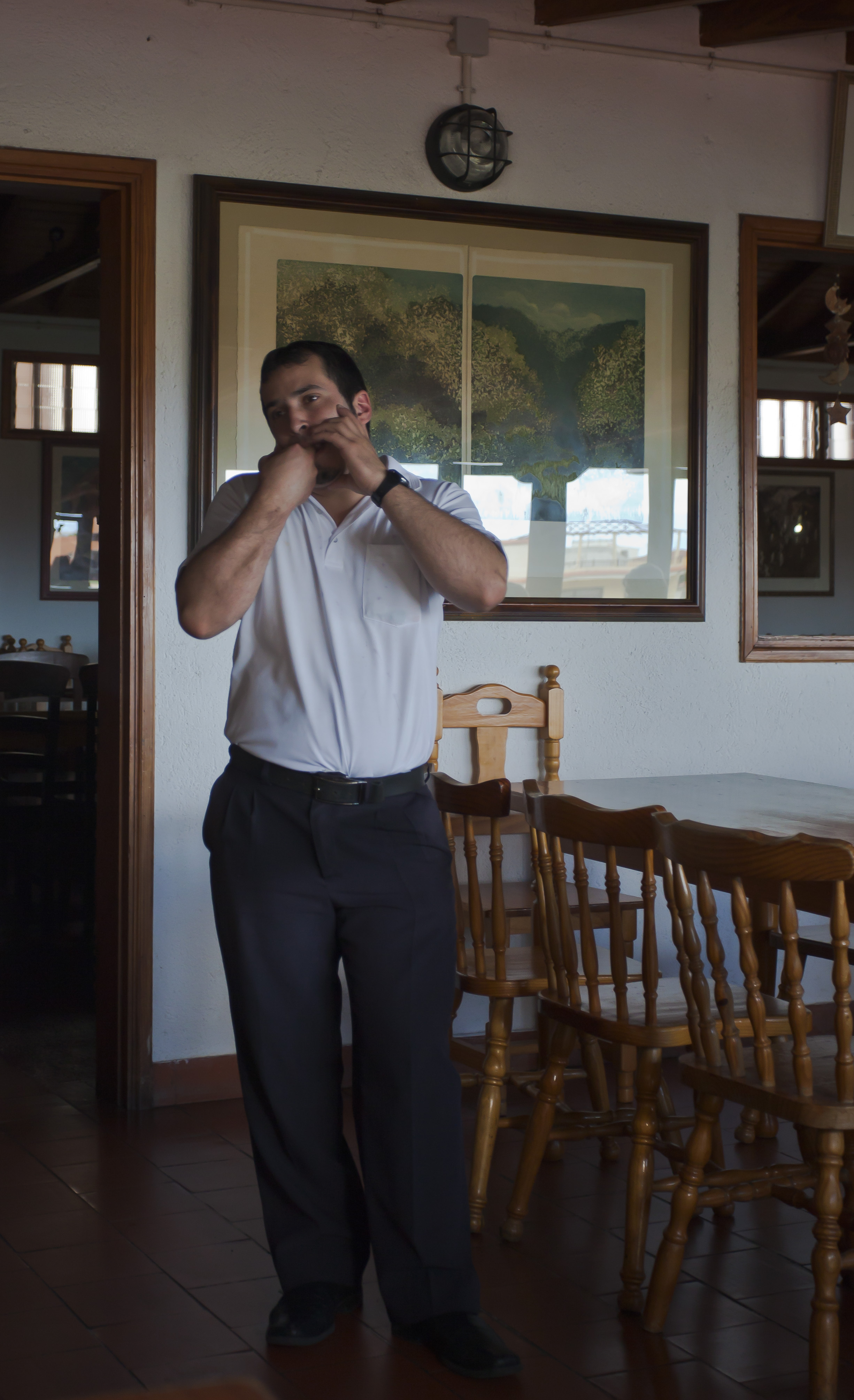
Silbo Gomero demonstration at a restaurant in La Gomera.

Silbo Gomero is not used only by Gomerans since visitors to the island can be exposed to it in restaurants that provide demonstrations for tourists. La Gomera's minister of tourism, Fernando Mendez, said that whistling is essential to La Gomera's tourism industry.

== Features ==
A dialogue in Silbo Gomero

According to different studies, Silbo Gomero has between two and five vowels and between four and ten consonants. It is a whistled form of a dialect of Canarian Spanish. Silbo replaces each vowel or consonant with a whistling sound. Whistles are distinguished according to pitch and continuity. As with other whistled forms of non-tonal languages, Silbo works by retaining approximately the articulation of ordinary speech and so "the timbre variations of speech appear in the guise of pitch variations".

Silbo Gomero is a complex language to learn, with its whistling techniques requiring physical precision and a strength of the body parts producing the language that can be acquired only by practice. Silbo Gomero uses the tongue, lips and hands and so differs greatly from conventional language, which uses the mouth cavity to blend and contrast several acoustic frequencies. The whistling mechanism, in contrast, is limited to a single basic pitch between 1,000 and 3,000 hertz. The physical precision comes in the whistler's ability to vary the frequencies at different speeds and start and stop the production of the sound waves. The technique is handed down within La Gomera's community, with unchanged teaching methods that date to the late 19th century. Since the same pitch can represent many sounds, Silbo has many fewer phonemes than Spanish. Therefore, communication can be ambiguous; context and word choice are important for effective communication.

=== Vowels ===
Silbo Gomero's vowels are described roughly as sustained lines of different frequencies. There has been conflicting research about which vowels are distinguishable by users of Silbo Gomero, and which frequency bands correspond to each vowel. This is likely caused by a shift in the language, as it moved from being used for long-distance to short-distance communication, which allowed for the increasingly precise and complex use of it, that wouldn't be practical on long distances. Most recent research shows that all five vowels of spoken Spanish (/i/, /e/, /a/, /o/, /u/) are statistically distinct from each other when whistled by experts at close distances, although the frequency ranges for /o/ and /u/ overlap heavily and are not distinct in less ideal circumstances. The frequency ranges of each vowel depend on the specific whistler and the distance of communication.

In 1978, Ramón Trujillo of the University of La Laguna theorized that Silbo Gomero has only two vowels. His work, containing almost 100 spectrograms, concludes that the language has two vowels and four consonants. In Trujillo's work, Silbo's vowels are given one quality, that of pitch, either high or low. The "high" vowel represents the /i/, /e/ spoken vowels, and the "low" vowel represents the /a/, /o/, /u/ spoken vowels.

However, later studies give an analysis of Silbo's vowels showing that more than two vowels are statistically distinguished in production and perception. In 2005, Annie Rialland of the University of Paris III: Sorbonne Nouvelle published an acoustic and phonological analysis of Silbo based on new materials that showed that not only gliding tones but also intensity modulation plays a role in distinguishing Silbo's sounds. She concluded that there is a distinction between /o/ and the other "low" vowels, but that her data was insufficient to reach a conclusion about whether /o/ and /u/ or /i/ and /e/ were distinct.

Trujillo's 2005 collaboration with the Gomeran whistler Isidro Ortiz and others revised his earlier work, found that four vowels are perceived and described in detail the areas of divergence between his empirical data and Classe's phonetic hypotheses. Despite Trujillo's 2005 work acknowledging the existence of four vowels, his 2006 bilingual work El Silbo Gomero. Nuevo estudio fonológico inexplicably reiterated his two-vowel theory. Trujillo's 2006 work directly addressed many of Rialland's conclusions.

In 2008, Meyer suggested that there are four vowel classes: /i/, /e/, /a/, /u, o/, based on recordings collected from one expert whistler in 2003. Meyer also stated there are five perceived vowels with significant overlap. Rialland and Trujillo agree that the harmonic of the whistle matches the second formant of the spoken vowels. Spoken /a/'s F2 and whistled /a/'s H1 match in their frequency (1480 Hz). There is a disconnect in harmonics and formants near the frequency basement. Spoken speech has a wide range of F2 frequencies (790 Hz to 2300 Hz), but whistles are limited to between 1200 and 2400 Hz. That causes vowels to be shifted upward at the lower end (maintaining 1480 Hz as /a/), increasing confusion between /o/ (spoken F2 frequency 890 Hz, whistled <1300 Hz) and /u/ (spoken frequency 790 Hz, whistled <<1300 Hz). In whistling, the frequency basement must be raised to the minimum whistle harmonic of 1000 Hz, frequency spacing in the vowels, which increases misidentification of the lower vowels.

In 2026, Agata Jakubiak of the University of Warsaw analysed a large amount of recordings recorded around 2022 by four different expert whistlers, and found that modern Silbo Gomero, as used by experts within schools, has a significant distinction between all five vowels of spoken Spanish, including /o/ and /u/ which were previously thought to be indistinguishable. She also found that /o/ and /u/ were represented by much lower frequency ranges that previously described, with the range of /o/ falling slightly above 1000 Hz, and the range of /u/ falling slightly above 1000 Hz. Additionally, as the first study to analyse the vowel frequencies from more than one whistler, she found a large between-speaker variation in the vowel frequencies, especially for /i/ and /e/, with some whistlers /i/ reaching much higher frequencies than previously described.

Also in 2026, Jonay Acosta-Armas from the National University of Distance Education suggested that the shift in the description of Silbo Gomero vowels, from 2 vowels to 4 vowels, does not represent a change in the understanding of Silbo Gomero, but rather a change in Silbo Gomero itself, as it moved from a traditional form used to communicate over long distances, to a recreational form used in classrooms and during contests.

=== Consonants ===
Silbo Gomero's consonants are modifications of the vowel-based "melody line" or "vocal line". They can rise or fall and be modified by being broken, continuous or occlusive. The four main consonants in a 1978 analysis are listed as follows:

Consonants
Pitch	General representation	Consonants of the spoken language represented
continuous high pitch	⟨y⟩	/l/, /ʎ/, /n/, /ɲ/, /ɾ/, /r/, /d/ and /j/
broken high pitch	⟨ch⟩	/t͡ʃ/, /t/, /s/
continuous low pitch	⟨g⟩	/ɡ/, /b/, /m/, /j/ and /h/
broken low pitch	⟨k⟩	/k/ and /p/

The documentation on the official Silbo Gomero page on the UNESCO website is in line with Trujillo's 1978 study. He suggested that consonants are either rises or dips in the "melody line" that can be broken or continuous. Further study by Meyer and Rialland suggests that vowels are stripped to their inherent class of sound, which is communicated in the whistle in these ways: voice (/k/ vs /ɡ/) is transmitted by the whistled feature [-continuity]. A silent pause in the whistle communicates [+voice] (/ɡ/), and a [+continuous] consonant gives the quality [-voice] (/k/). Placement of the consonant (dental, palatal, fricative) is transmitted in whistle by the loci, the sharpness or speed, of the formant transitions between vowels. Consonant classes are simplified into four classes. Extra high loci (near vertical formant loci) denotes affricates and stridents, rising loci denotes alveolar, medial (loci just above the vowel formant) denotes palatal, and falling (low loci) denotes pharyngeal, labial, and fricative. This gives eight whistled consonants, but including tone gradual decay (with intensity falling off) as a feature on continuous and interrupted sounds gives 10 consonants. In these situations gradual decay is given [+voice], and continuous is given [+liquid].

The representation of /s/ is treated as a broken high pitch in Silbo though in the spoken language, /s/ is a continuous high pitch consonant. There are two reasons for the anomaly. One is that in functional terms, /s/ is high in frequency and thus extremely useful. Also, as the continuous high-pitched consonant of Silbo already represents many other consonants of the spoken language (/l/, /ʎ/, /n/, /ɲ/, /ɾ/, /r/, /d/ and /ʝ/), it would be very confusing to add to that list. Thus, as the broken high-pitched consonant does not fully represent /t͡ʃ/ and /t/, it can represent the frequently-used /s/.

=== Cognitive features ===
Studies have shown that Silbo Gomero speakers process the whistled register in the same way as standard spoken language. Studies by Manuel Carreiras of the University of La Laguna and David Corina of the University of Washington published in 2004 and 2005 involved two participant groups of Spanish-speakers. One group spoke Silbo, and the other did not. Results obtained from monitoring the participants' brain activity by functional magnetic resonance imaging show that while non-speakers of Silbo merely process Silbo as whistling, Silbo-speakers process the sounds in the same linguistic centres of the brain as those that process Spanish sentences.

== In popular culture ==
The filmmaker and photographer Francesca Phillips wrote and directed a 26-minute documentary on the usage of Silbo Gomero in La Gomera, Written in the Wind (2009). The movie won Best Short Documentary in Anthropology at the World Mountain Documentary Festival held in Qinghai, China, in 2010.

The Romanian filmmaker Corneliu Porumboiu directed the 2019 film The Whistlers, in which Silbo features prominently.

The French singer Féloche dedicated a song to Silbo, released in an album of the same name.

There are other examples of transposition of an oral natural language into a pitch string. When quickly spoken, Yoruba vowels are assimilated and consonants elided and so linguistic information is carried by the tone system, which can therefore be transposed into talking drums.
