= The Whistlers (film) =

2019 film

- Theatrical release poster
- Directed by: Corneliu Porumboiu
- Written by: Corneliu Porumboiu
- Produced by: Marcela Ursu
- Starring: Vlad Ivanov; Catrinel Menghia
- Cinematography: Tudor Mircea
- Edited by: Roxana Szel
- Production companies: 42 Km Film; Komplizen Film; Les Films du Worso mk2
- Release dates: 18 May 2019 (Cannes); 13 September 2019 (Romania)
- Running time: 97 minutes
- Countries: Romania; France; Germany
- Languages: Romanian; English; El Silbo; Spanish
- Box office: $808,743

The Whistlers (Spanish: La Gomera) is a 2019 crime black comedy thriller film directed by Corneliu Porumboiu and starring Vlad Ivanov. It premiered in competition at the 2019 Cannes Film Festival. It was selected as the Romanian entry for the Best International Feature Film at the 92nd Academy Awards, but it was not nominated.

== Plot ==
Zsolt, a corrupt businessman in Bucharest in league with Spanish gangsters, has been smuggling drug money out of the country in mattresses. Among those on his payroll are his mistress, the glamorous Gilda, and Cristi, a police inspector whose payoffs are left in his mother's cellar. When Zsolt is arrested, the Spaniards concoct a plot to free both him and the latest mattressfuls of cash. Cristi will be seduced by Gilda and taken to the Spanish island of La Gomera to learn El Silbo, the native whistling language. Back in Bucharest, he will then poison Zsolt, who will be rushed to hospital under guard. Once Cristi has ascertained the room number, he will whistle it to Gilda outside and the Spaniards will then rescue Zsolt. Many things go wrong and most characters get killed while Cristi, badly injured, ends up in hospital. Gilda finds out the room number and whistles to him to join her at a hotel in Singapore.

(The eight chapters of the film are not chronological, and the real-time sequence is: 1. Zsolt 2. Mama 3. Gilda 4. Kiko 5. Sylbo language 6. Paco 7. Magda 8. Cristi.)

== Cast ==
- Vlad Ivanov as Cristi
- Catrinel Marlon as Gilda
- Agustí Villaronga as Paco
- Sabin Tambrea as Zsolt
- Cristóbal Pinto as Carlito
- Sergiu Costache as Toma
- Antonio Buíl as Kiko

== Production ==
The film was produced through the director's company 42 km Film in collaboration with France's Les Films du Worso and Germany's Komplizen Film, with mk2 handling the distribution sales. Shooting took place in Romania and the Canary Islands.

== Release ==
The film competed for the Palme d'Or at the 2019 Cannes Film Festival. In May 2019, the film's UK distribution rights were sold to Curzon Artificial Eye, and the US rights sold to Magnolia Pictures.

== Reception ==
On review aggregator website Rotten Tomatoes, the film holds an approval rating of 83% based on 114 reviews, with an average rating of 7/10. The site's critical consensus reads, "The Whistlers finds writer-director Corneliu Porumboiu working in a more crowd-pleasing vein than previous efforts, with thoroughly entertaining results." Metacritic, which uses a weighted average, assigned the film a score of 77 out of 100, based on 27 critics, indicating "generally favorable reviews". Reporting from the Cannes Film Festival, Jessica Kiang of Variety wrote that the film "is an enjoyable affair with just enough of a slant to feel a little offbeat", but might leave fans of Porumboiu's previous films disappointed. New York Times's A.O. Scott wrote that while the film is "an ingeniously structured, engaging and witty display of filmmaking skill," it "is Porumboiu’s most elaborate feature and in some ways his least ambitious".

=== Accolades ===
Award	Year	Category	Recipient	Result	Ref(s)
Saturn Awards	2021	Best International Film	The Whistlers	Nominated	

== See also ==
- List of submissions to the 92nd Academy Awards for Best International Feature Film
- List of Romanian submissions for the Academy Award for Best International Feature Film
