= Iman (surname) =

Iman (and its various different spellings) is a surname. Notable people with this surname include:

- Akhtar ul Iman (1915–1996), Urdu poet and screenwriter
- Akhtarul Iman (born 1964), Indian politician
- Chanel Iman (born 1990), American model
- D. Imman (born 1983), Indian film composer and singer
- Dedi Iman (born 1985), Indonesian footballer
- Harun Iman (born 1981), Somali-American runner
- Ken Iman (1939–2010), American football player
- Ronald L. Iman, American statistician
- Santiago Imán, Creole revolutionary
- Sohibul Iman (born 1965), Indonesian politician
- Tamisha Iman (born 1970), American drag performer

== See also ==
- Iman
- Iman (given name)
- Inman (surname)
