= Imani =

Imani may refer to:

== People ==
=== Given name ===
- Imani (rapper) (born 1971), American rapper
- Imani Perry (born 1972), American interdisciplinary scholar of race, law, literature, and African-American culture
- Imani Sanga (born 1972), Tanzanian musicologist
- Imani Coppola (born 1978), American singer-songwriter and violinist
- Imani Patterson (born 1985), former African-American actor
- Imani Barbarin (born 1990), American disability activist
- Imani Hakim (born 1993), American actress
- Imani de Jong (born 2002), Dutch swimmer
- Imani Lanquedoc (born 2003), English footballer
- Imani Barnes, American politician
- Imani Uzuri, African-American vocalist
- Imani Williams, British singer

=== Surname ===
- Blair Imani, African-American Muslim activist

=== Middle name ===
- SZA (born 1989), American singer, real name Solána Imani Rowe

== Media ==
- Imani (film), 2010 Swedish/Ugandan film
- Imani Vol. 1, 2015 American album by Blackalicious
- Imani Firewing, a supporting character of Nickelodeon/Nick Toons 2017 show Mysticons

== Organizations ==
- Imani Temple African-American Catholic Congregation
- IMANI Centre for Policy and Education, Ghanaian think tank
- Imani School, American elementary and middle school
- Imani Winds, American wind quintet

== See also ==
- Iman (disambiguation)
