= Eman Ikot Ebo =

- Village
- Interactive map of Eman Ikot Ebo
- Country: Nigeria
- State: Akwa Ibom
- Local Government Area: Uruan

Eman Ikot Ebo is a village in Uruan local government area of Akwa Ibom State, Nigeria. The Ibibio people are occupants of the Eman Ukpa village.
