= Iman Afsarian =

Iranian painter (born 1974)

- ایمان افسریان
- Born: 1974 (age 50–51); Tehran, Pahlavi Iran (Iran)
- Education: University of Art (BA, MA)
- Occupation(s): Visual artist, editor, critic, artistic director
- Known for: Painting
- Movement: Realism

Iman Afsarian (born 1974; Persian: ایمان افسریان) is an Iranian realist painter. He is also the artistic director, editor, author, and a critic for the prestigious Iranian quarterly art magazine Herfeh: Honarmand since its first issue in 2003.

== Background ==
Afsarian was born in Tehran. He took his undergraduate studies at Tehran University of Arts (now University of Art), where he graduated with a B.A. degree in painting in 1996, and later a M.A. degree in illustration in 2000.

== Works ==
As an artist and after entering the Iranian art movement of the 2000s, Afsarian tried to strengthen and promote what is referred to as figurative, realistic or naturalistic style of painting.

== Exhibitions and awards ==
Afsarian has held numerous solo exhibitions and has participated in group exhibitions in many countries such as the US, UK, Austria, Russia, and his works are included in some reputable collections. For example, in the U.S., Moscow, and the UK he has more than 5 solo participation and exhibitions in several group exhibitions. He is also the author of a two-volume book that was published in 2016 in Persian entitled: The Quest for a New Age.
