= Iman Aminlari =

Iranian architect and designer

- Born: 28 June 1979 (age 47); Isfahan, Iran
- Occupation: Architect

Iman Aminlari (born 28 June 1979) is an Iranian architect and designer.

He has taught at the Islamic Azad University of Najafabad from 1390 to 1391 A.H. and at the University of Amin at Fooladshahr from 1389 to 1390 A.H.

== Biography ==
Aminlari was born in 1979 into a family of artists in Isfahan, Iran. His interest in art and design began when he started painting as a child. He obtained his master's degree in architecture from in 2006 from the Islamic Azad University at Shiraz.

Aminlari founded the architectural office Khaneh-e Tarh in 2006.

He has also established Angelo-Ceramic, which specialises in tile and ceramic design, in cooperation of Italian partners.

Aminlari has designed various apartment complexes, residential homes, stores, offices, public venues, and many other buildings and structures in Iran, particularly in the Isfahan region. He has also designed the Vulcan Restaurant in Isfahan.

His awards include the National Architecture Award of Iran.
