= Henry Inman =

Henry Inman may refer to:

- Henry Inman (Royal Navy officer) (1762–1809), British Royal Navy officer
- Henry Inman (painter) (1801–1846), American portrait, genre, and landscape painter
- Henry Inman (police officer) (1816–1895), cavalry officer, founder and first commander of the South Australia Police
- Henry Inman (U.S. Army officer and author) (1837–1899), U.S. soldier and author
- Henry Inman (wrestler) (1886–1967), British Olympic wrestler
