= Khaled El Emam =

Khaled El Emam is the founder and CEO of Woodway Assurance and is the Canada Research Chair (Tier 1) in Medical AI at the University of Ottawa, where he is a Professor in the School of Epidemiology and Public Health. El Emam is also a senior scientist at the Children's Hospital of Eastern Ontario (CHEO) Research Institute and director of the multi-disciplinary Electronic Health Information Laboratory, conducting academic research on de-identification and re-identification risk.

El Emam is a Privacy by Design Ambassador recognized by the Ontario Information and Privacy Commissioner. He previously held the Canada Research Chair in Electronic Health Information at the University of Ottawa and was an associate professor in the Faculty of Medicine at the university. He has a PhD from the Department of Electrical and Electronics Engineering, King's College, at the University of London, England. In 2003 and 2004, he was ranked as the top systems and software engineering scholar worldwide by the Journal of Systems and Software based on his research on measurement and quality evaluation and improvement, and ranked second in 2002 and 2005.

In 2007, El Emam founded Privacy Analytics which was acquired by IMS Health in 2016. In 2019, he founded Replica Analytics, a synthetic real-world data company. In January 2022, Replica Analytics was acquired by health care technology company Aetion. As of 2022, El Emam has served as Editor-in-Chief of JMIR AI, a peer-reviewed, open-access sister journal of JMIR Publications. In 2025, he founded data assurance company, Woodway Assurance.

== Selected works ==
Books authored:

- K. El Emam: The ROI from Software Quality. Auerbach Publications (CRC Press), 2005.
- K. El Emam and L. Arbuckle: Anonymizing Health Data. O’Reilly, 2013 (new edition published in 2014).
- K. El Emam: Guide to the De-Identification of Personal Health Information. Auerbach Publications (CRC Press), 2013.
- K. El Emam, L. Mosquera, and R. Hoptroff: Practical Synthetic Data Generation: Balancing Privacy and the Broad Availability of Data. 2020.
- K. El Emam and L. Arbuckle: Building an Anonymization Pipeline: Creating Safe Data. 2020.

Books edited:

- K. El Emam, J-N Drouin, and W. Melo (eds.): SPICE: The Theory and Practice of Software Process Improvement and Capability Determination. IEEE Computer Society Press, 1998.
- K. El Emam and N. H. Madhavji (eds.): Elements of Software Process Assessment and Improvement. IEEE Computer Society Press, 1999.
- K. El Emam (ed.): Risky Business: Sharing Health Data while Protecting Privacy. Trafford, 2013.

Peer-reviewed journal articles:

- K. El Emam, F. Dankar, A. Neisa, E. Jonker: "Evaluating the risk of patient re-identification from adverse drug event reports", BMC Medical Informatics and Decision Making 2013, 13:114.
- V. Bobicev, M. Sokolova, K. El Emam, Y. Jafer, B. Dewar, E. Jonker, S. Matwin: "Can Anonymous Posters on Medical Forums be Reidentified?", Journal of Medical Internet Research 2013 (Oct 03); 15(10):e215.
- K. El Emam, E. Moher: "Privacy challenges when collecting data for public health purposes", Journal of Law, Medicine and Ethics 2013, 41(Suppl 1): 37-41.
- B.A. Malin, K. El Emam, C.M. O'Keefe: "Biomedical data privacy: Problems, perspectives, and recent advances" Journal of the American Medical Informatics Association 2013, 20(1):2-4.K. El Emam, E. Jonker, E. Moher, L. Arbuckle: "A review of evidence on consent bias in research", Am J Bioeth 2013; 13(4):42-44.
- H-W. Jung, K. El Emam: "A Linear Programming Model for Preserving Privacy when Disclosing Patient Spatial Information for Secondary Purposes", International Journal of Health Geographics, 2014, 13:16.
- K. El Emam, L. Arbuckle, A. Essex, S. Samet, B. Eze, G. Middleton, D. Buckeridge, E. Jonker, E. Moher, C. Earle: "Secure Surveillance of Antimicrobial Resistant Organism Colonization in Ontario Long Term Care Homes", PLoS ONE, 2014, 9(4): e93285.
- F.K. Dankar, K. El Emam: "Practicing Differential Privacy in Healthcare: A Review", Transactions on Data Privacy 2013, 6(1): 35-67.K. El Emam: "Anonymizing and Sharing Individual Patient Level Data", BMJ 2015, 350:h1139.
- K. El Emam, C. Álvarez: "A Critical Appraisal of the Article 29 Working Party Opinion 05/2014 on Data Anonymization Techniques", International Data Privacy Law 2015, 5 (1): 73-87.
