= Haitham Hakki =

- Born: August 29, 1948 (age 77); Alraqqa, Syria
- Occupation: Journalist
- Years active: 1973 – present
- Website: http://www.galrahbaproductionss.com

Haitham Hakki (Arabic: هيثم حقي; born 1948) is a Syrian television director, screenplay writer, and television producer.

== Career ==
His first film was his graduation film from the Moscow Film Institute in 1973: Hotel Thanatos, an adaptation of a book by André Maurois. He created his Enterprise Al Rahba for artistic productions in 1987. Al Rahba now has a small cinema-city outside of Damascus.

In the 41 years of his working life he wrote hundreds of cinematographic articles as well as political articles, and he published a book, Between Cinema and Television.

== Filmography ==
=== Early works ===
Hakki after his return from Moscow wrote and directed 5 short films:

- The Game
- The Dam
- The Swing (Special Jury award of Prague film festival 1978, Tanit d'Argent of Carthage Film Festival 1978)
- Special Mission
- Fire and Water

=== Feature films ===
After five years of searching for a producer, Rashwan filmed his first feature film Basra (2008) and produced it with Egyptian Independent film. Then he met the producer Haitham Hakki who enthused to complete the production of the film, and expanded it from HD format to 35mm format.

Basra had a lot of success in the festivals. It was screened in 12 festivals and got 6 awards and 1 mention.
