= Eman El-Asy =

Egyptian actress (born 1985)

- إيمان العاصي
- Born: Eman Abdelazim Moez El-Asy; August 28, 1985 (age 41); Cairo, Egypt
- Occupation: Actress
- Years active: 2003–present
- Spouse: Nabil Zanusi (m. 2010; div. 2010)

Eman Abdelazim Moez El-Asy (Arabic: إيمان عبد العظيم معز العاصي; born 28 August 1985) is an Egyptian actress.

== Biography ==
Elasi was born in Cairo. She studied business administration before becoming an actress.

Her acting career began after the director Khaled Bahgat saw a photo of her in a magazine. He contacted her and offered her a role in a television series called Ams La Ymout (Yesterday Does Not Die). She performed alongside Raghda and Ryadh Elkholi as Raghda's daughter. Her next role was in the series Ahlam fi el-Bawwaba (Dreams in the Gate), directed by Haitham Hakki. Since then, she has acted extensively in television and film.

== Filmography ==
=== Television roles ===
- Ha' Mashru'
- El Saba' Banat
- Ragel w Emra'aten
- Adeyet Nasb
- Ahlam fi el Bawwaba
- Da'wet Farah
- Hadret el Mottaham Abi
- Hob La yamut
- Saba' Banat
- El Adham
- Ella Ana
- Eldayra
- Naseeby We Esmetak
- Gaafar el Omda
- Be ra8m Elqanoun

=== Film roles ===
- Masgun Tranzit
- Ma'lab Haramiyya
- Hekayet Bent (Girl’s Story)
- Hamati Bethebeni
- Fares
- El 5albous
- No Surrender (2018)
