= George H. Inman =

American politician

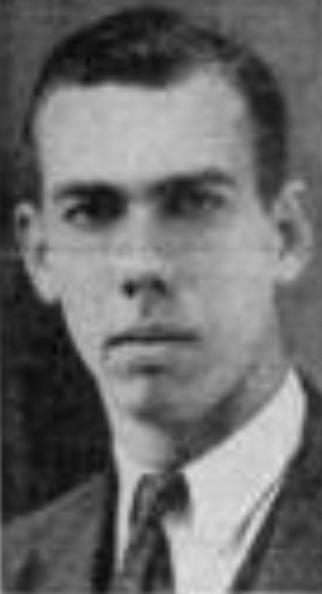
- Inman in 1939

Member of the Florida House of Representatives
- In office 1939–1943

Personal details
- Died: January 3, 2001 (aged 88)
- Party: Democratic

George H. Inman (died January 3, 2001) was an American politician. He served as a Democratic member of the Florida House of Representatives.
