= Iman al-Asadi =

Iraqi Parliament member

Iman al-Asadi إيمان الأسدي

lawmaker
- In office 7 April 2005 – 20 May 2010

Personal details
- Born: 18 February 1964 (age 62) Karbala, Republic of Iraq
- Party: Independent
- Spouse: Fadhil Alasadi
- Education: University of Cairo, University of Baghdad
- Profession: Political Science, Law

Iman Khaleel Shaalan al-Asadi (Arabic: إيمان خليل شعلان الأسدي) (born 18 February 1964) is a Liberal Iraqi politician and former lawmaker of the Council of Representatives of Iraq.

== Personal life ==
Al-Asadi was born in Karbala. She studied political science at the University of Cairo and International law at the University of Baghdad. In 2003 she was a professor of law at Al-Mustansiriya University.

== Political career ==
Prior to her election in 2005 Al-Asadi was a member of some civil society organizations in Baghdad between 2004 and 2005. She was then nominated for the Western Constituency of Karbala for January 2005 elections. In 2005, Al-Asadi was elected one of advisors committee of Council of Representatives of Iraq. Al-Asadi was also a Member of the National Iraqi Alliance.

== Books ==
- Federalism In Iraq and impact on national unity
