= Iman Rezai =

Iman Rezai (born 1981 in Shiraz, Iran) is an artist currently living and working in Berlin, Germany.

In March 2012, Rezai attracted international attention for his conceptual artwork "Die Guillotine" (German for: The Guillotine).

== Early life ==
Rezai began his artistic career at art school in Tehran, studying in Tokyo and London before moving to Berlin where he became a masters student at the University of Arts in the class of Leiko Ikemura from 2006 to 2012. In January 2015, his brother Ardavan Rezai published the autobiographical book "We are all mouses" (original German title "Wir sind alle Mäuse" and a translation mistake in the word 'mouses' was kept) that releases insights of the childhood of the two brothers and their migration to Berlin.

== Art ==
=== Die Guillotine ===
In 2012, Iman Rezai and Rouven Materne, who were at this time master students at the Berlin University of Arts, have built an execution instrument and started a public vote concerning the killing of a sheep to assess and represent the current state of democracy. The construction of the machine and the literature surrounding the life or death of the sheep was already met with resistance at the University whilst still in its planning stage. In a democratic vote, with rules established by the artists, the public could decide whether a sheep will be executed by a colourful instrument of death devised by him. Over a period of four weeks 4.2 million people voted from all over the globe and over 500 different international media reported on the uproar. The artists announced the controversial project was sold for $2.3 million. This was later revealed as fake news.

=== Cyber War 2012 ===
Using the email address of the New National Gallery Berlin, Iman Rezai invited guests to the fictional exhibition named "The performative post-modern as an expression of modern austerity in the age of precarity."

With "BundesInvest", Rezai demonstrated how easy it is to establish a company that appears to specialise in the sale of nuclear waste.

=== Waterboarding 2012 ===
With his performance "Waterboarding" as part of an exhibition, Rezai invited volunteers who could be subjected to the procedure in a rack created by him – to find out for themselves whether Waterboarding should be judged as a painful experience or merely a harmless shower.

=== Exhibitions ===
- 2023 “EXITUS”, Berlin, Germany
- 2022 “DIALOGUE WITH THE OTHER” O GALLERY, Tehran, Iran
- 2020 “SPRAY III”, Alte Muenze Berlin, Germany
- 2019 “SPRAY MOUNTAIN", Berlin, Germany
- 2018 “OFFBEAT”, Schaufenster, Berlin, Germany
- 2018 “THAT’S ALL RIGHT MAMA”, XXY-ROOM, Berlin, Germany
- 2018 “SPRAY", VOODOO55 Art Space, Berlin, Germany
- 2018 LUFTHACKEN /Virtual /Robot
- 2017 I AM E-WASTE /Virtual
- 2013 “QUAL & WAHL”, KUNSTVEREIN Wolfsburg, Germany
- 2012 “CYBER WAR”, Neue Nationalgalerie Berlin /Virtual
- 2012 "Illusion H2O", von Marten, Berlin
- 2012 "1965,85 °C", Spinnerei, Leipzig
- 2012 "Die Guillotine", Virtuell
- 2012 "Licht und Schatten", Beta-Haus, Berlin
- 2011 "Neu West Berlin", Berlin
- 2011 "Veilchen", Uferhallen, Berlin
- 2011 "Zu Gast bei Connex", Connex, Leipzig
- 2011 "Bubble Projects", (NL)
- 2010 "MEETING POINT", Forum Kunst und Architektur, Essen
- 2010 "Artpoint", Bereznitsky Gallery, Donetsk (UA)
- 2010 "Musashino Art Festival", MAU, Tokio (JP)
- 2010 "No Limit", MAU, Tokio (JP)
- 2010 "MEETING POINT", Kommunale Galerie Berlin, Berlin
- 2010 "Dragonz, come out to play", Tapetenwerk, Leipzig
- 2010 "Rough&Tough", UdK Berlin, Berlin
- 2010 "Forgotten Bar II", Berlin Kreuzberg
- 2010 "Kongress für Anders", Hamburg
- 2010 "Forgotten Bar I", Berlin Kreuzberg
- 2010 "Hands and friends II", Pels Leusden, Berlin
- 2010 "Hands and friends I" UdK, Berlin
- 2009 "Nacht & Nebel Neukölln", Berlin
