= Iman al-Qahtani =

Saudi Arabian journalist

Iman al-Qahtani ايمان القحطاني
- Occupations: Journalist, activist

Iman al-Qahtani ايمان القحطاني is a Saudi journalist and activist.

== September 2013 trial ==
Al-Qahtani was present at the historic September 2013 trial of Saudi dissidents Mohammad Fahad al-Qahtani and Abdullah al-Hamid in Riyadh, and used her Twitter account to post an ongoing account of the trial. Trials in Saudi Arabia are frequently held in private, so gaining access to the courtroom was "a matter of luck", she said. The court was unprepared for the number of people who showed up. Those who had gained access to the courtroom tweeted the progress of the trial, while many more monitored the trial online. Al-Qahtani remarked especially on the huge interaction with Twitter.

== Education ==
Al-Qatani is a graduate of the college of art in Riyadh, where she received a BA in English literature and science in 2002. She has worked for several newspapers as a journalist.

== Detention and travel ban ==
In July 2013, she was stopped at the airport on her way to Istanbul, and tweeted that she was subject to a travel ban.
