= Emon =

Emon is a Bengali and Japanese name. In both cultures it may be both a given name and a surname.

== Statistics ==
The 2010 United States census found 120 people with the surname Emon, making it the 139,228th-most-common surname in the country. This represented an increase from 107 people (142,819th-most-common) in the 2000 census. In both censuses, slightly less than nine-tenths of the bearers of the surname Emon identified as non-Hispanic white, and about seven percent as Asian.

== People ==
=== Bengali ===
The Bengali name (ইমন), originating from the Arabic word iman, means "religious faith". People with this name include:

- Shawkat Ali Emon (born 1941), Bangladeshi composer
- Salman Shah (actor) (real name Chowdhury Muhammad Shahriar Emon; 1971–1996), Bangladeshi film and television actor
- Mamnun Hasan Emon (born 1983), Bangladeshi film actor
- Emon Mahmud Babu (born 1993), Bangladeshi footballer
- Anisul Islam Emon (born 1994), Bangladeshi cricketer
- Parvez Hossain Emon (born 2002), Bangladeshi cricketer
- Abu Shahed Emon (fl. 2000s), Bangladeshi film director
- Emon Saha (fl. 2000s), Bangladeshi composer
- Emon Ahmed (fl. 2008–2010), Bangladeshi cricketer
- Emon Chowdhury,

=== Japanese ===
The Japanese name (衛門) means "palace guard" – literally, "guardian (衛) of the gate (門)". People with this name include:

- Emon Saburō (衛門 三郎), legendary figure of early ninth-century Japan
- Akazome Emon (赤染 衛門; died 1041), Japanese waka poet

=== Other ===
- Albert Emon (born 1953), French football manager
