= Catrinel Marlon =

Romania actress and director

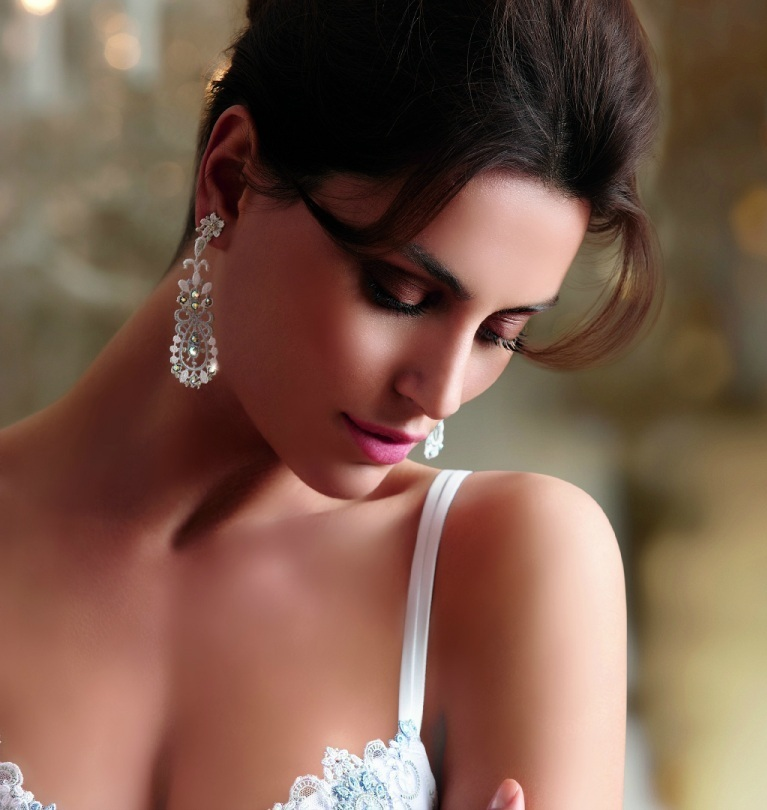
- Marlon in 2015
- Born: Catrinel Menghia; Iași, Romania
- Citizenship: Romania, Italy
- Occupations: Model, actress, producer, director
- Years active: 2011–present
- Notable work: La Gomera, La Citta Ideale
- Height: 1.75 m (5 ft 9 in)
- Children: 2

Catrinel Marlon is a Romanian-Italian model, actress, producer and director. She is known for her participation in films like The ideal city, Tales of Tales and La Gomera, as well as television series Un passo dal cielo, CSI and Inspector Coliandro.

In her modelling career, she is known for being the lead model of the Fiat Abarth Campaign, Teller, Whirlwind Summer and El Palacio Del Hierro.

In 2022, she made her directorial debut with the short film Ossa, and the next year directed the Drama Girasole.

The same year she published an autobiography called Non Avevo Gli Occhi Azurri.

== Career ==
In 2012, she had the achievement to lead the success of the Fiat Abarth campaign and appeared in a spot of the Super Bowl. The same year she made a guest appearance as Elisabetta in the CBS television crime procedural series CSI.

In 2015, she participated in the English-Italian fantasy/horror film Tale of Tales alongside Salma Hayek, John C. Reilly and Toby Jones.

In 2017, she had a role in the Italian film The Ploy, a thriller about the death of Italian director and screenwriter Pier Paolo Passolini.

In 2018, she landed the lead role of the Romanian/Spanish movie La Gomera with the Romanian star Vlad Ivanov. In this film she played the role of the femme fatale Gilda. The movie had an international premiere at the Cannes film festival of the same year.

In 2020, she participated in an Italian movie based on the novel of Alexandre Dumas in the role of Zingara.

In 2022, she produced and wrote her own short drama film called Ossa, a drama.

In 2023, she produced and directed her first film called Girasole, another drama film set in the north of Italy and with a personal story for one of her relatives. The movie have premiere in the 41 Torino Film Festival. Between the 24 of November and the 2 of December.

She has had two children with her partner, Massimiliano Di Lodovico.

== Filmography ==
=== Films ===
Year	Name	Director	Character
2012	The ideal City	Luigi Lo Cascio	Alexandra
2012	Tutti Il Rumore Dil Mare	Federico Brugia	Alyena
2014	Leone nel Basilico	Leone Pompucci	Julieta
2014	Three Touches	Marco Rissi	Catrinel
2015	Tales of Tales	Mateo Garrone	Maid of Honor
2015	The error	Brando De Sica	Catrinel
2016	Them Who?	Fabbio Boneffaci	Ellen
2018	The Ploy	David Grieco	n/a
2019	La Gomera	Comeliu Porerumbu	Gilda
2020	Tutti per 1- Uno per Tutti	Giovanni Veronessi	Zingara
2022	Ossa	Catrinel Marlon	n/a
2023	Girasoli	Catrinel Marlon	n/a

=== Tv series ===
Year	Name	Director	Character
2012	Un Passo Dal Cielo	Rccardo Dona	Anya
2013–2014	CSI	Brad Tanenbaum	Elisabetta
2016	Donne	Emmanuele Imbucci	Ines
2017–2018	The Red Door	Carmine Elia	Helke
2018	Inspector Colliandro	Antonio Manetti/ Marcos Manetti	Ambra

== Book ==
- Non Avevo Gli Ochii Azurri ( Newton Compton Editori ,2021)
