= Emam Safi =

Emam Safi امام صفي
- Village
- Location within Iran
- Coordinates: 31°27′52″N 49°24′48″E
- Country: Iran
- Province: Khuzestan
- County: Haftgel
- Bakhsh: Raghiveh
- Rural District: Gazin

Population (2006)
  - Total: 224
- Time zone: UTC+3:30 (IRST)
  - Summer (DST): UTC+4:30 (IRDT)

Emam Safi (Persian: امام صفي, also Romanized as Emām Şafī; also known as Emām and Imām Shāfī) is a village in Gazin Rural District, Raghiveh District, Haftgel County, Khuzestan Province, Iran. At the 2006 census, its population was 224, in 32 families.
