= Imane Khalifeh =

Lebanese peace activist (1955–1995)

- إيمان خليفة
- Born: 1955; Beirut, Lebanon
- Died: 1995 (age 39/40)
- Occupation: educator
- Known for: anti-war activism

Imane Khalifeh (Arabic: إيمان خليفة; 1955–1995) was a Lebanese educator and peace activist.

== Life ==
Imane Khalifeh was born in Beirut in 1955. She was educated there and lived through the breakout of the Lebanese Civil War in 1975. She was trained in child psychology and taught at the Beirut University College kindergarten. She became a member of the Institute for Women's Studies in the Arab World.

"We want simply to live in peace
We want to raise up our children
And save our brothers and sisters...
We want our families to remain whole
Let us walk out of our isolation and join one another.
Let us walk out of our tears and screams of pain."

~ Imane Khalifeh, 1984

In April 1984, nine years into the war, Khalifeh developed the idea of a peace march in which the silent majority of the people of Lebanon would protest and express their opposition to the civil war. She wrote a poem suggesting the march that was published by the majority of Beirut dailies. She spoke out against the evils of war and coined the slogan "No to war. No to the tenth year of war! Yes to peace." Khalifeh joined a peace group that included Nawaf Salam and Laure Moghaizel. They circulated the anti-war petition "The Document of Civil Peace" throughout Beirut, gathering 70,000 signatures. On 6 May 1984, both Muslim and Christian parts of the city were to join for a march at the demarcation line known as "Museum alley" which separated the warring militias and armies. The march was stopped by blind shelling that resulted in many casualties.

Khalifeh continued to work for peace in Lebanon until 1989 when she went into exile in Paris. She was awarded the Right Livelihood Award in 1984 "for inspiring and organising the Beirut peace movement." She died in 1995.
