= Eman Ukpa =

- Village
- Interactive map of Eman Ukpa
- Country: Nigeria
- State: Akwa Ibom
- Local Government Area: Uruan

Eman Ukpa is a village in Uruan local government area of Akwa Ibom State, Nigeria inhabited by the Ibibio people.
