= Kongabula =

Indigenous Australian people

The Kongabula were an indigenous Australian people of the state of Queensland.

== Country ==
The Kongabula inhabited the steep forest areas of the Carnarvon Range and the headwaters of the Injune (Hutton) Creek and Dawson River north of their meeting point. They lay both east and north of the Great Dividing Range Norman Tindale set their lands at 2,300 square miles (6,000 km^{2}).

== Alternative names ==
- Ongabula
- Khungabula

== Sources ==
- "AIATSIS map of Indigenous Australia". AIATSIS. 14 May 2024.
- Tindale, Norman Barnett (1974). "Kongabula (QLD)". Aboriginal Tribes of Australia: Their Terrain, Environmental Controls, Distribution, Limits, and Proper Names. Australian National University Press. ISBN 978-0-708-10741-6.
