= Eman Al-Ghamidi =

Saudi politician

Eman Al-Ghamidi is a Saudi politician. In September 2017, she was appointed as "assistant mayor of Al Khubar governorate", making her the most senior female politician in Saudi Arabia.
