= Iman Dozy =

Dutch footballer

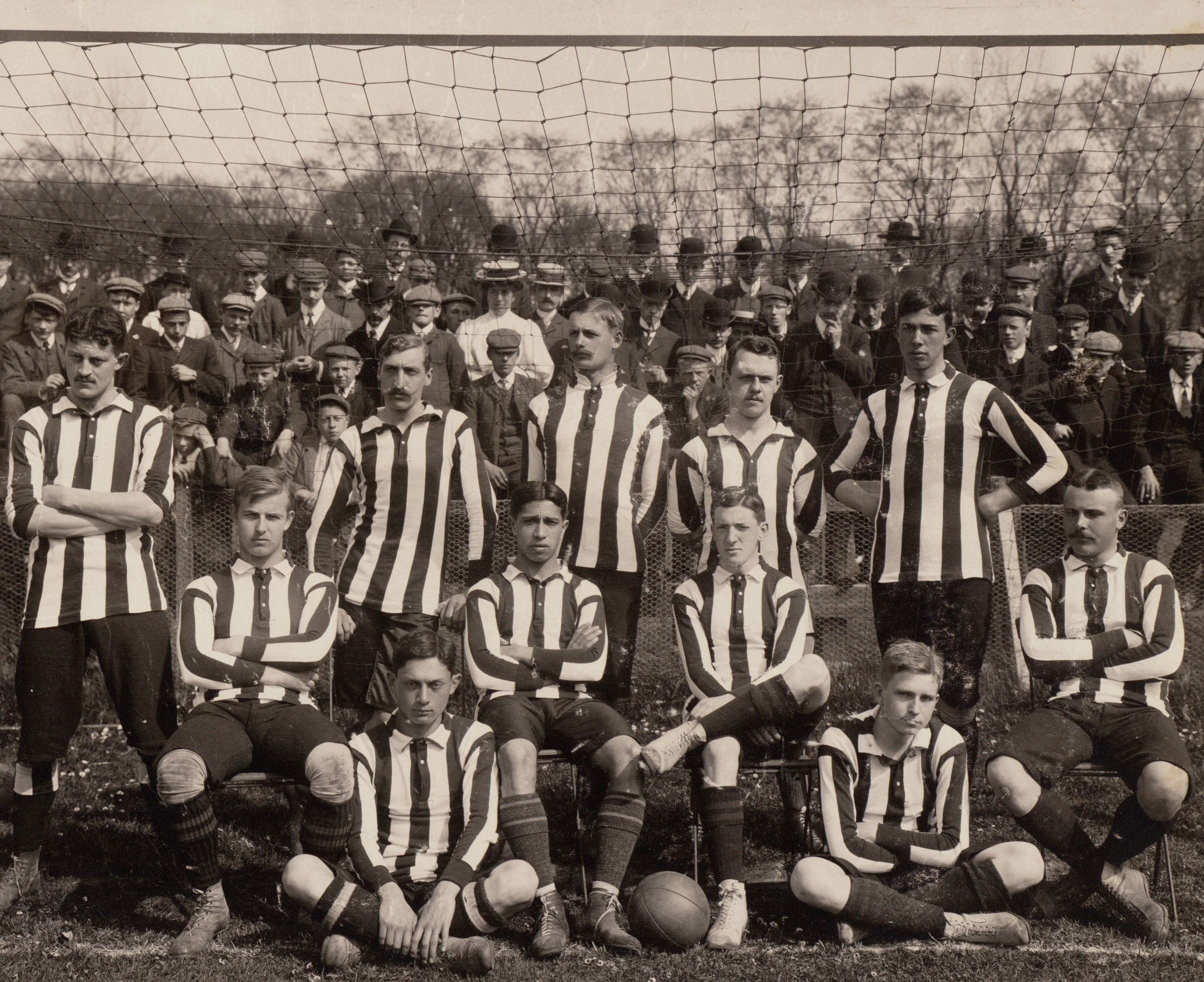
- Dozy & the Netherlands national team (1907)

Personal information
- Full name: Iman Cornelis Dozy
- Date of birth: 10 May 1887
- Place of birth: Ambarawa, Central Java
- Date of death: 18 July 1957 (aged 70)
- Position: Midfielder

Senior career*
Years	Team	Apps	(Gls)
1901–1908	Leidsche CFC Ajax	175	

International career
1907	Netherlands	4	(0)
- * Club domestic league appearances and goals

Iman Dozy (10 May 1887– 18 July 1957) was a Dutch football player.

== Club career ==
In 1901, Dozy made his debut at Ajax Leiden, the club for which he would go on to play 175 matches. He was also a cricket player and later became chairman of ASC.

== International career ==
He made his debut for the Netherlands national football team in an April 1907 friendly match against England and earned a total of 4 caps, all in 1907.

== Administration ==
In 1927, he became chairman of Ajax Sportsman Combinatie, the club formed by the merger of Ajax Leiden en De Sportman. He was named honorary chairman of the club in 1932.
