= Eman Lam (dancer) =

Hong Kong dancer, singer, comedian and painter

- Notable work: Founder and producer of Stand Up HK 香港的是但噏 and Le Jeu Dance

Chinese name
- Chinese: 林伊汶
- Hanyu Pinyin: Lín Yīwèn
- Jyutping: Lam4 Yi1man4
- Website: eman.rocks standup-hk.com leJeu-hk.rocks

Eman Lam (Chinese: 林伊汶) is a Hong Kong dancer, singer, comedian and painter. She is the founder and artistic director of Le Jeu dance and Stand Up HK comedy companies. In 2016, she started a stand-up comedy platform called Stand Up HK 香港是但噏 - the only English and Cantonese stand up company in Hong Kong for local comedians.

== Background ==
Lam was classically trained since she was four, and the Royal Academy of Dance (London) Honor Award Winner for Ballet from 1995 to 2000. Lam taught herself to paint and at the age of 16 went to United States for university. She currently performs, teaches and choreographs dance. She has been working as a full-time painter at her home studio and planning her solo exhibition in mid-2018.

With Le Jeu Dance established Lam has focused on comedy with an emphasis on stand-up performance. She has been performing stand-up comedy in both English and Cantonese since 2012.

In 2016, Lam set up a stand-up comedy platform called Stand Up HK (香港是但噏), the only English and Cantonese stand up company in Hong Kong for local comedians.

On 5 August 2017, Lam performed her first One Woman Show in both English, Cantonese (and a little bit in Mandarin as well), back to back. Every one of Lam's performances is different and she frequently ends her shows with some comedy parody.
