= Yiman people =

Aboriginal Australian people in Queensland

The Yiman, also known as Yeeman, Eoman or Jiman, (Note: Reid says Jiman is the local white man's term for the tribe) and by themselves in modern times as Iman, are an Aboriginal Australian people living in the Upper Dawson River region around Taroom of eastern Central Queensland.

== Language ==
Almost nothing is known directly about Yiman, because the tribe was thought to have been wiped out before any words could be recorded. (Note: Dalby writes:"Not one word of the language was recorded before the whole tribe was wiped out in 1857.")

== Society ==
Yiman people persist as they have for tens of thousands of years. While little may be known to the general public about Yiman social structure, Yiman people survive and thrive. Their territory borders Wuli Wuli, Wadjigu, Garingbul, Gungabula, Mandandanji and Barunggam language regions. In a settler crusade to hunt them down, in late 1857, many of the Yiman victims killed were examined to see if they bore on their chests the distinct boomerang design typical of the Yiman thought responsible for the Fraser family massacre.

== History ==
Records of the Yiman mainly concern the Hornet Bank massacre which took place on 27 October 1857. The incident took at a site known as "Goongarry" which had been squatted by the Scottish immigrant Andrew Scott who had applied for a tender over this area of Yiman traditional land in late 1853. It has been assumed, on the basis of settler practice, that Scott had occupied this stretch of territory at least a year before that date.

Though Scott's tender was approved four years later, (Note: Laurie p.1307:'An odd feature of this occupation was that Andrew Scott had leased Hornet Bank, 30 miles west of Taroom, to the Frasers before he was in actual possession of the run himself') he leased the property to a shipwright John Fraser in March 1854. Fraser died later that year of pneumonia, and the lease was continued by his wife, 5 sons and 4 daughters, who, disregarding Scott's advice not to allow blacks anywhere near the holding, befriended the local Yiman, since they had experience earlier of friendly Aboriginal hands on various stations on the Darling Downs. The family also employed a tutor Mr. Neagle. According to the account of the sole survivor Sylvester Fraser who managed to hide after being skulled by a nulla nulla, they had been attacked either at dawn or according to other accounts just as the full moon rose, by roughly 100 tribesmen. The 3 oldest girls were raped before being killed. One other of the Frazer family survived: William who was away in Ipswich. Judging from one report, it is possible some Mandandanji also joined in the attack. It may well be that the Yiman, according to Gordon Reid, were just one of a confederation of tribes involved, and not the only perpetrators.

=== Pursuing the Yiman ===
The following day, Walter Powell and his native police tracked down and ambushed one of about 10 bands believed to be responsible, the only one thought to have moved westwards, killing five and wounding several others. In a second incident, Powell and his troops, joined by William Fraser, killed three men and three women near Carrabah station, on 27 November. Some days later, they, now joined by Second-Lieutenant Robert Walker killed another seven people at Jundah station, even though the Jundah station manager maintained that they hadn't been involved. Then the group murdered 11 other Aborigines to the east, in the vicinity of Cockatoo station. Tracking suspected participants hailing from the Baking Board district, west of Chinchilla, they came across a band of Aborigines at Redbank, rounded them up and killed them over the protests of the local Ross family. Settlers noticed Aboriginals shifting their grounds, seeking security in the Auburn and Burnet districts. Settlers from the Upper Dawson and these areas organized a settler vigilante "crusade in December", which lasted 6 weeks, during which an estimated 80 more Aborigines were killed in several camps.

The flight of the Yiman deep into the Auburn and Burnet districts may suggest that they had cultural ties with groups indigenous to this region. Linguistic research by Nils Holmer links the dispersal to the Upper Dawson people being part of the Wakka Wakka: a linguistic grouping that also included the Kabi Kabi of the Wide Bay area. (Note: The whole group would embrace 'the Mandandanji of the Condamine around Dulacca; the Barunggam of the Chinchilla-Dalby district, the Goreng goreng of the Northern Burnett and possibly the Wulili of the Middle Dawson.') A guerilla war ensued for some 18 months. In January 1858. 200-300 Aborigines launched a night attack on a group with the magistrate William Wiseman, on the road between Rannes and the Gracemere station. The assault failed, but Wiseman blamed the Upper Dawson tribes. After the killing of 4 settlers in April, 60 tribesmen attacked In July 1858 50 to 60 Aborigines attacked Henry Gregory's Gwambagwyne station, near Taroom.

In the reprisals by settlers in the district and native police, upwards of 300 Yiman were hunted down and killed, and the executioners were not subject to prosecution. According to Gordon Reid, the manner of reprisal contributed to setting the pattern governing government policy and settler attitudes towards the indigenous peoples of Queensland down to the end of the 19th century. Years later, Steele Rudd's father, Thomas Davis recalled riding through the scrubland and sighting "the bleaching bones of the dead blacks strewn here and there - a gruesome sight - full-ribbed bodies, fleshless arms, disjointed leg-bones and ghastly grinning skulls peeping out of the grass."

=== Recent history ===
The Iman had not been wiped out. In 1998, they filed an application with the National Native Title Tribunal (NNTT) for recognition of native title to their homeland. On 14 September 2015, an agreement was entered on the Register of Indigenous Land Use Agreements by the NNTT. It related to an area of approximately 14,020 km^{2} (5,410 sq mi) about 75 kilometres (47 mi) north-east of Roma. On 23 June 2016, the case was concluded when John Reeves, J. of the Federal Court, sitting in Taroom, approved a consent decree. The judge said that the court order did not grant the Iman native title; instead, it recognised their pre-existing title; and their continuing connection to the land, despite its being 150 years since they were forced into hiding. The same day, Anthony Lynham, Minister for State Development and Minister for Natural Resources and Mines in the Government of Queensland, welcomed the outcome.

== Sources ==
- "AIATSIS map of Indigenous Australia". AIATSIS.
- Atkinson, Judy (2002). Trauma Trails, Recreating Song Lines: The Transgenerational Effects of Trauma in Indigenous Australia. Spinifex Press. ISBN 978-1-876-75622-2.
- Dalby, Andrew (2002). Language in Danger. Allen Lane. ISBN 978-0-713-99443-8.
- "Iman People and Local Government Indigenous Land Use Agreement (ILUA)". Agreements, Treaties and Negotiated Settlements (ATNS) project. 14 September 2015. Archived from the original on 27 March 2017.
- "Iman People win native title rights". Government of Queensland. 23 June 2016.
- Laurie, Arthur (25 July 1957). "The Hornet Bank Massacre, October 27, 1857" (PDF). Journal of the Royal Historical Society of Queensland: 1306–1315.
- Newton, Matthew (24 June 2016). "A place to call home: Native Title granted to Iman people over lands surrounding Taroom and Wandoan". Sunshine Coast Daily.
- "QCD2016/005 - Iman People #2". National Native Title Tribunal. Archived from the original on 19 April 2017.
- Reid, Gordon (28 May 1981). "From Hornet Bank to Cullin-La-Ringo" (PDF). Journal of the Royal Historical Society of Queensland: 62–82.
- Reid, Gordon (1982). A Nest of Hornets: The Massacre of the Fraser Family at Hornet Bank Station, Central Queensland, 1857, and Related Events. Oxford University Press. ISBN 978-0-195-54358-2.
  - Reid, Gordon (1981). A nest of hornets: the massacre of the Fraser family at Hornet Bank station, Central Queensland 1857 and related events (Masters theesis). doi:10.25911/5d7638aee6194.
- Rothwell, Nicolas (29 June 2013). "Mapping the massacres of Queensland Aboriginal society". The Australian. Archived from the original on 10 June 2017.
