= Waddy =

Aboriginal Australian hardwood club

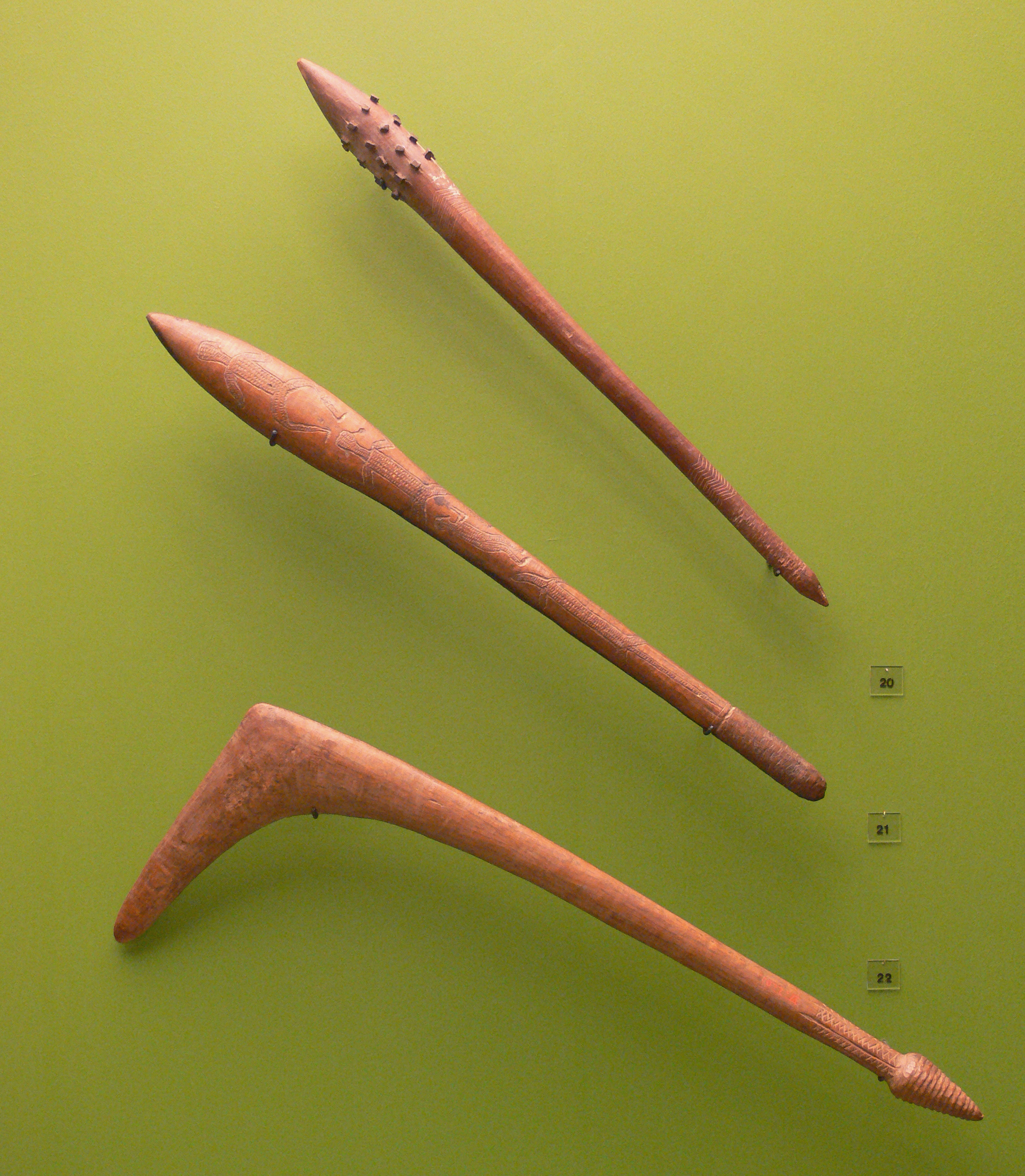
Waddies made by the Arrernte people

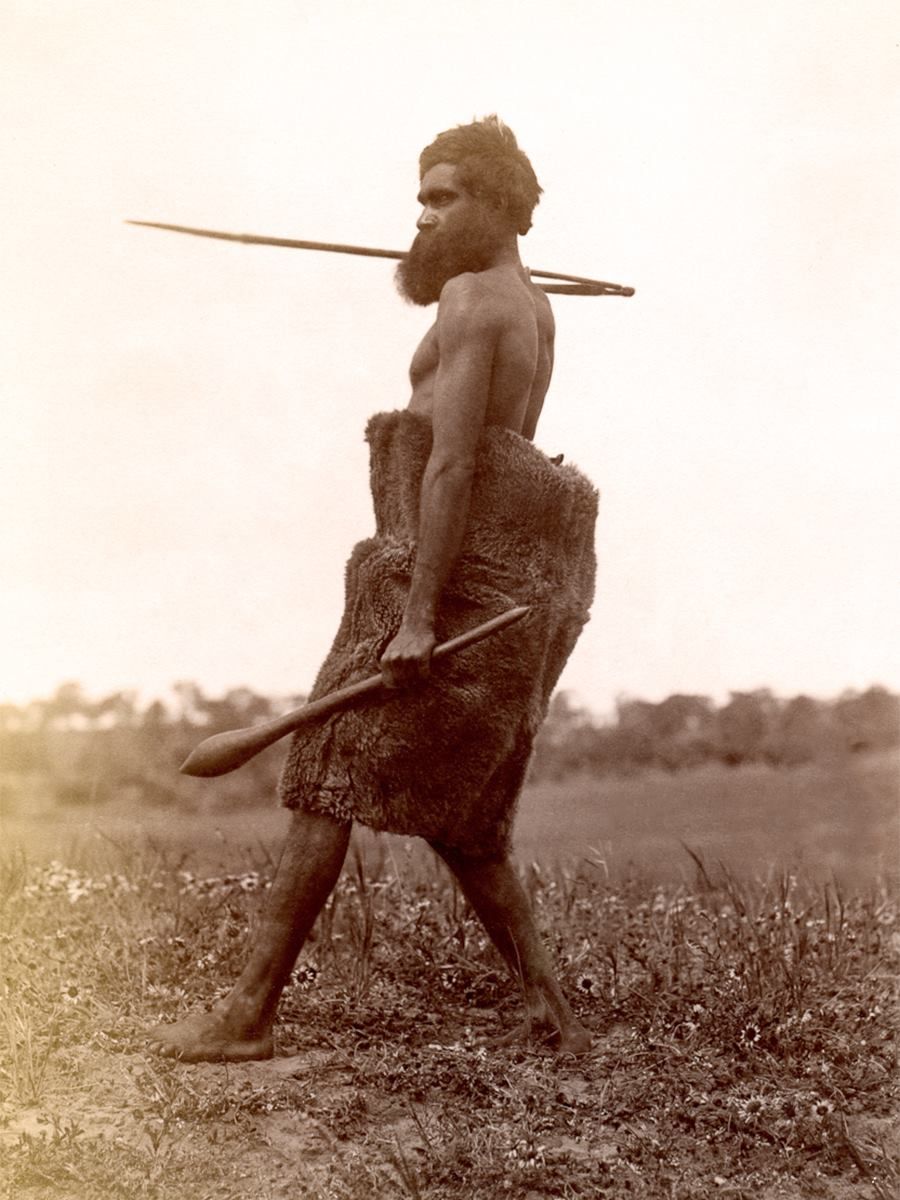
Aboriginal man carrying waddy, woomera (spear-thrower) and spear, South Australia, c. 1876

A waddy, nulla-nulla, leangle or boondi is an Aboriginal Australian hardwood club or hunting stick for use as a weapon or as a throwing stick for hunting animals. Waddy comes from the Darug people of Port Jackson, Sydney. Boondi is the Wiradjuri word for this implement. Leangle is a Djadjawurrung word for a club with a hooked striking head.

== Description and use ==
A waddy is a heavy pointed club constructed of carved hardwood timber; it was a traditional weapon developed by Aboriginal people in Australia.

Waddies were used in hand-to-hand combat and were capable of splitting a shield. They could also kill or stun a prey. They could be used as projectiles or to make fire and make ochre. The waddies were sometimes used to punish those who broke Aboriginal law.

== Construction ==
The waddy was made by both men and women and could be painted or left unpainted. Its construction varied from tribe to tribe, but it was generally about one metre in length and sometimes had a stone head attached with spinifex resin and at least one string. It was made from where a branch met the tree or from a young tree that was pulled up with its roots from the ground.

== Alternative spellings ==
Waddy has also been spelled as wadi, wady, and waddie. The spelling stabilised around the mid-nineteenth century, partly to help distinguish it from the Arabic - Lebanese word wadi, a dry water course. Nulla-nulla has been recorded with the following variations: nullah-nullah, nilla-nilla and nolla-nolla.

== Gallery ==
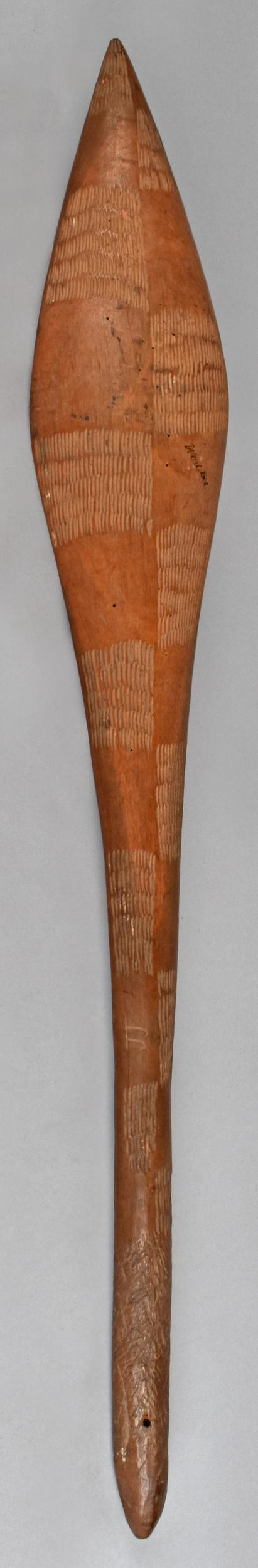

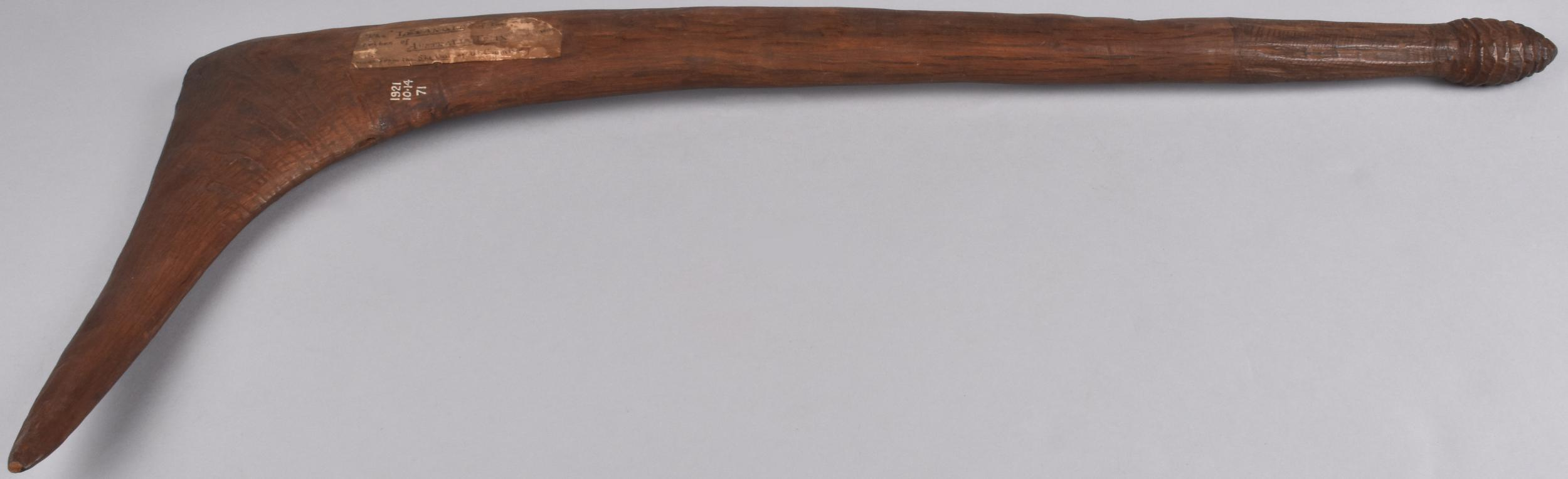

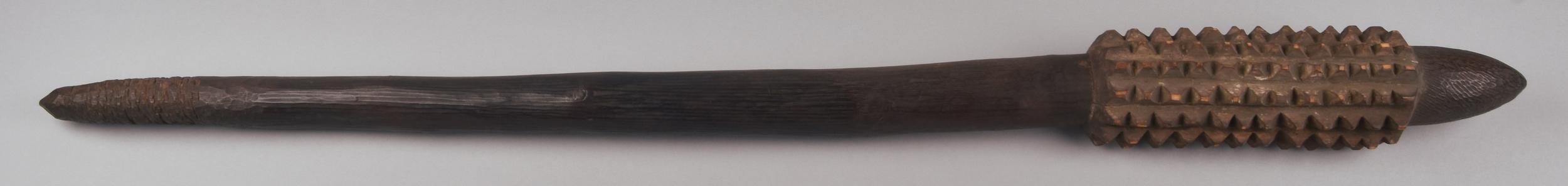

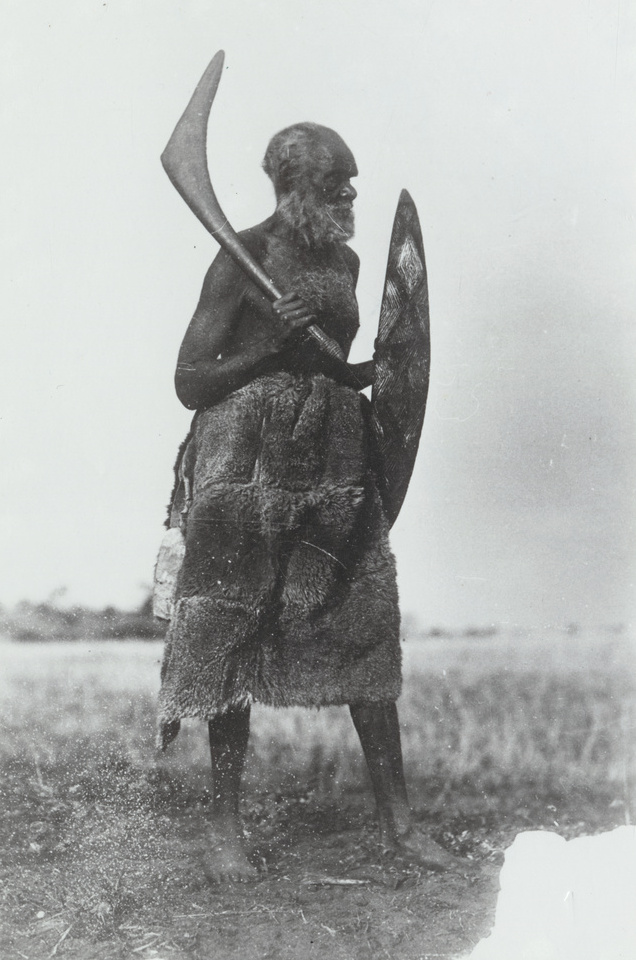

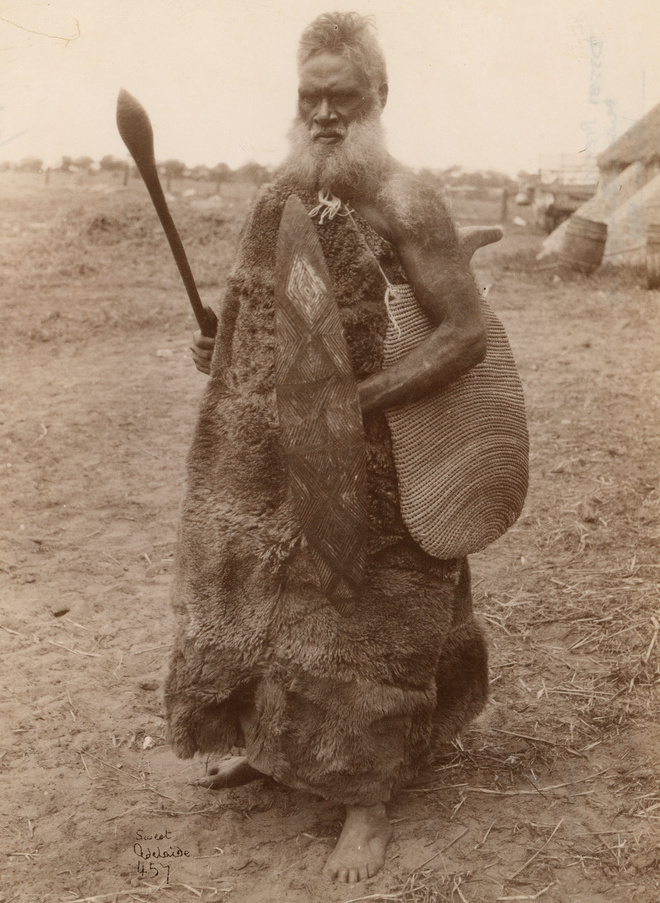

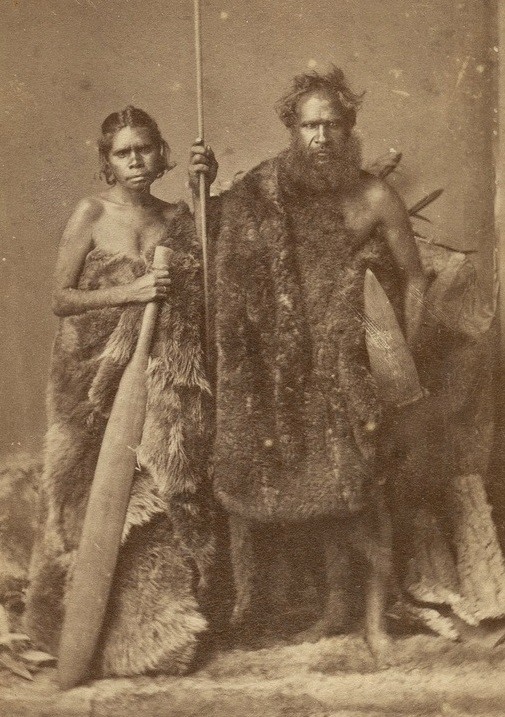

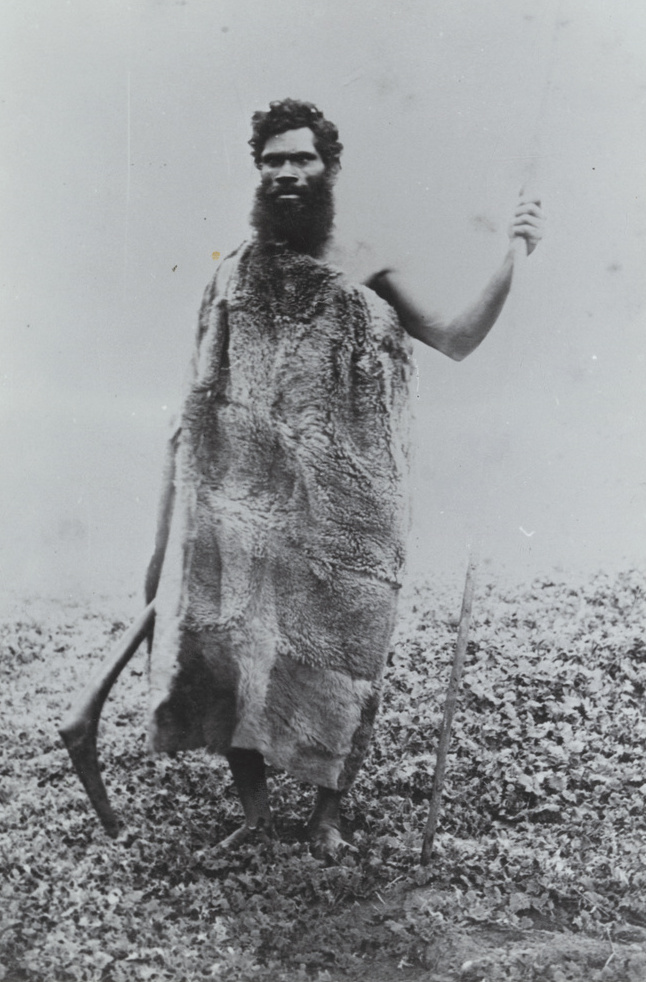

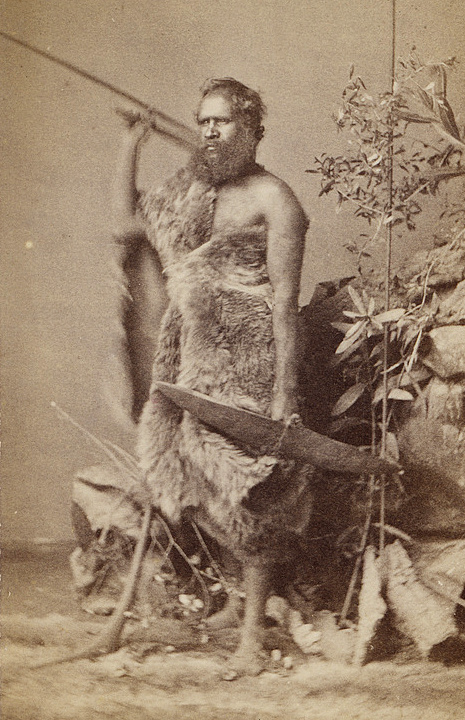
