= John Davidson =

John Davidson may refer to:

== Arts and entertainment ==
- John Davidson (poet) (1857–1909), Scottish poet and playwright
- John Davidson (actor, born 1886) (1886–1968), American actor
- John Davidson (entertainer) (born 1941), American television actor and game show host

== Military ==
- John Davidson (Royal Navy officer) (c. 1818–1881), English naval surgeon
- John Wynn Davidson (1825–1881), U.S. Army major general
- John Davidson (British Army officer) (1876–1954), British major general, known as "Tavish" Davidson, later a Member of Parliament
- John F. Davidson (1908–1989), U.S. Navy admiral

== Politics and law ==
- John Davidson (Lower Canada politician) (died 1838), Canadian merchant, civil servant and politician
- John S. Davidson (1846–1894), American politician, member of the Georgia State Senate
- John Andrew Davidson (1852–1903), Canadian politician
- J. C. C. Davidson (1889–1970), British politician
- John James Davidson (1898–1976), British MP, 1935–1945
- John Davidson (Illinois politician) (1924–2012), American politician
- John Andrew Davidson, 2nd Viscount Davidson (1928–2012), British politician

== Religion ==
- John Davidson (reformer) (1549–1603) Scottish Presbyterian minister during the Scottish Reformation
- John Davidson (minister) (1834–1881), Scottish Presbyterian minister and academic
- John Davidson (British writer) (born 1944), English writer on mysticism and Christian origins
- John Davidson (priest), Canadian Anglican priest

== Sports ==
- John Davidson (cricketer, born 1804) (1804–1898), English cricketer
- John Davidson (rugby union) (1851–1919), Scottish rugby union player
- John Davidson (ice hockey) (born 1953), Canadian NHL hockey player and executive
- John Davidson (rugby league) (born 1961), Australian rugby player
- John Davidson (cricketer, born 1964), Welsh cricketer

== Others ==
- John Davidson (antiquarian) (1725–1797), Scottish lawyer, publisher and antiquarian
- John Davidson (traveller) (1797–1836), English traveler in Africa
- John Ewen Davidson (1841–1923), English pioneer sugar planter and miller in Queensland
- John Davidson (botanist) (1878–1970), Scottish-Canadian botanist
- John Ogilvie Davidson (1892–1972), Canadian surveyor
- John Davidson (chemical engineer) (1926–2019), British chemical engineer awarded a Royal Medal in 1999
- John Davidson (activist) (born 1971), Tourette syndrome activist

== See also ==
- John Davison (disambiguation)
- Davidson (name)
