= John Davison =

John or Jon Davison may refer to:

- John Davison (priest) (1777–1834), English theological writer
- John Davison (theologian) (1793–1863), theologian and author of Considerations on the Poor Laws
- John Robert Davison (1826–1871), English barrister and politician
- John Davison (Kent cricketer) (1828–1871), English cricketer
- John Davison (politician) (1870–1927), British Labour Party politician, Member of Parliament for Smethwick 1918–1926
- John Clarke Davison (1875–1946), Northern Irish politician
- John Davison (composer) (1930–1999), American composer
- Jon Davison (film producer) (born 1949), film producer
- Jon Davison (professor) (born 1949), British academic
- John Davison (boxer) (born 1958), British boxer
- John Davison (sport shooter) (born 1966), British sport shooter
- John Davison (Canadian cricketer) (born 1970), Canadian cricketer
- Jon Davison (born 1971), vocalist with the bands Glass Hammer and Yes

== See also ==
- John Davidson (disambiguation)
