= Sam McDonald =

British soldier (1762–1802)

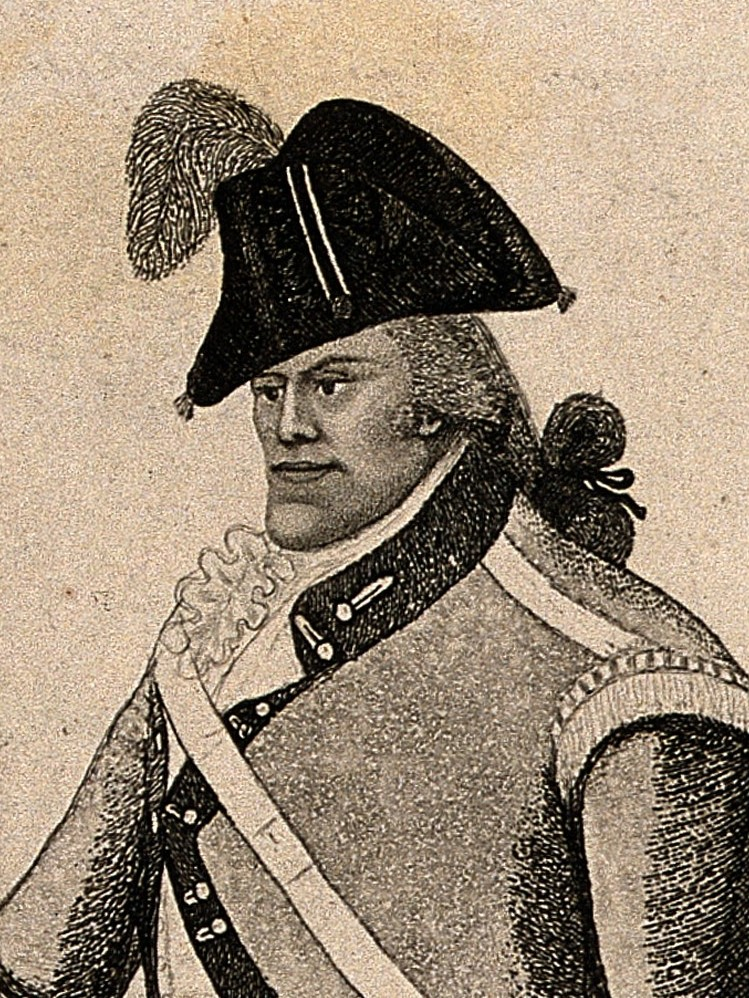
John Kay etching of Sam McDonald

Sam McDonald (1762 – 6 May 1802), called "Big Sam", was a Scotsman of unusual height for his day who had a distinguished military career and was a noted "strongman". Most sources state his height as 6 feet 10 inches (2.08 m), with a burly build, although one 1822 source claims 10 feet 4 inches (3.15 m).

== Life ==
Born in Lairg, Sutherland in 1762, he served in the 2nd Sutherland Fencibles 1779–83 and the Royal Scots 1783–1789 (where he served as Fugleman or drill-leader). From 1791 to 1793 he was employed by the Prince of Wales as lodge porter at Carlton House, and during this time appeared at the Drury Lane Theatre playing Hercules in "Cymon and Iphigenia". From 1793 to 1799 he was a sergeant in the 3rd Sutherland Fencibles, and from 1799 until his death in 1802 in the newly formed 93rd Sutherland. Due to his height and bulk he generally marched to the side of the formation, leading the regimental mascot, a deer. He was frequently detached for recruiting, and his image was later used on recruiting posters. Sergeant MacDonald died while stationed with the regiment on Guernsey.

There exist several engravings of him, both in military uniform and while serving as a gatekeeper for the Prince of Wales, including three by noted Scottish caricaturist John Kay.

His obituary in the Sydney Gazette was the first newspaper obituary printed in Australia; it appeared in the 12 March 1803 edition. A memorial stone and plaque for McDonald exists along Upland Road, St. Peter's Port on Guernsey, marking the former place of the Stranger's Cemetery where he was buried in 1802.

== Colorful stories ==
A number of colorful stories were told of McDonald after his death. One said that the Countess of Sutherland, impressed by his size, had given him 2 shillings 6 pence a day extra pay to feed himself, since she figured he must eat prodigiously. Another concerned a challenge to a fight from an Irish "giant"; McDonald insisted on shaking hands before the fight, and when his grip squeezed blood from the Irishman's fingernails, the Irishman backed down. A third had McDonald assigned to guard a cannon outside on a cold night; after a while he carried the cannon, unassisted, to the fire in the guardhouse, saying he could just as well watch it there.

Another story concerned McDonald and an Irish butcher in Dublin who didn't believe the stories of McDonald's strength; he challenged McDonald that if he carried a bullock two miles back to the barracks, he could have it for free, and McDonald promptly did so.
