= Murray Falls =

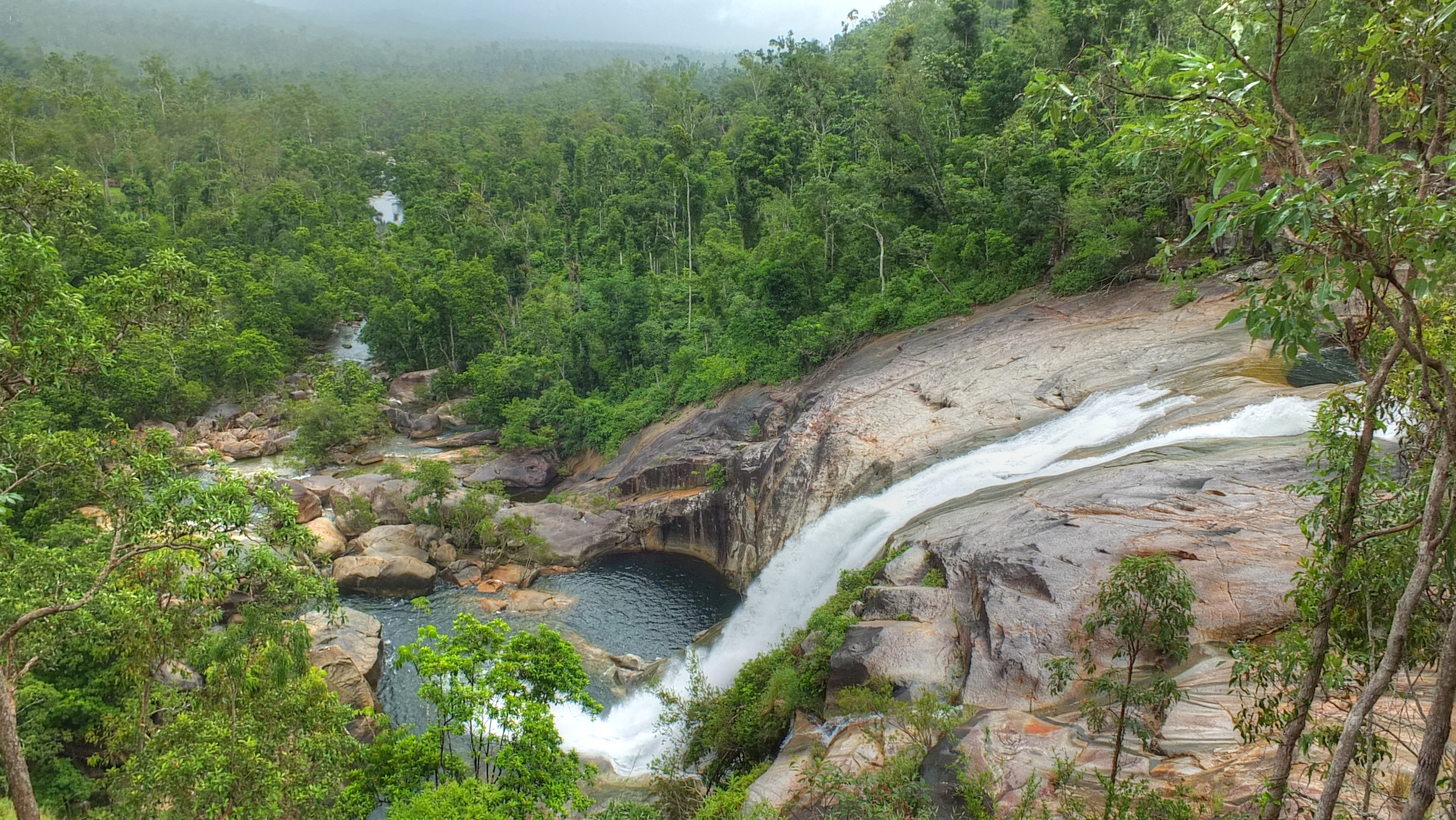
- Murray Falls, in 2013

- Location within Queensland
- Location: Far North Queensland, Australia
- Coordinates: 18°09′10″S 145°49′09″E
- Type: Cascade
- Total height: 20–30 metres (66–98 ft)
- Number of drops: 1
- Watercourse: Murray River

The Murray Falls, a cascade waterfall on the Murray River, is located in the UNESCO World Heritage–listed Wet Tropics in Murray Upper, Cassowary Coast Region in the Far North region of Queensland, Australia.

== Location and features ==
The Murray Falls are situated in the Girramay National Park, approximately 38 kilometres (24 mi) southwest of Tully, off the Bruce Highway between Tully and Cardwell. The falls descend between 20–30 metres (66–98 ft) and may be viewed from a boardwalk and viewing platform. A short walking track through the rainforest leads to a lookout, where the falls and the Murray Valley can be viewed. In the year ended 2012, the falls received an estimated 31,500 visitors.

In 2003, a man died in hospital after falling at the falls.

Other waterfalls in the Cardwell district include Wallaman Falls, Blencoe Falls and Attie Creek Falls.

The Murray River and its associated Murray Falls are named after the British colonial Native Police officer John Murray.

== See also ==
- List of waterfalls
- List of waterfalls in Australia
