= John Davidson (antiquarian) =

Scottish antiquary, author and publisher

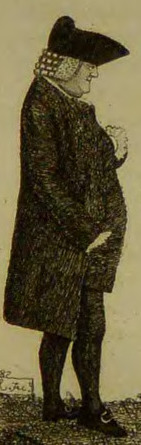
- Died: 29 November 1797
- Occupation: Antiquarian

John Davidson of Stewartfield and Haltree FRSE WS (c.1725-1797) was a Scottish antiquary, author/publisher and co-founder of the Royal Society of Edinburgh. He served as Deputy Keeper to the Signet. He was a friend of Lord Hailes, David Herd, William Tytler, George Paton and Callander of Craigforth, early figures in the Scottish Enlightenment. He was much admired by Bishop Thomas Percy, who described as a man of learning and very excellent critic.

== Life ==
He was born in 1724/5 the son of Elizabeth Brown, sister of Rev William Brown of Edinburgh and her husband, James Davidson of Haltree, an Edinburgh bookseller. He trained as a lawyer at the University of Edinburgh and was then apprenticed to George Balfour WS. He then worked as a Crown Agent, and agent for many wealthy Scottish landowners and noblemen, specialising in land transactions.

In 1758 he is noted as Joint Treasurer of the Society for the Propagation of Christian Knowledge. In 1790 he is listed as one of the few Freeholders in Edinburgh entitled to vote in the general election. From 1770 to 1796 he was Commissioner to the 3rd Duke of Buccleuch, amongst other wealthy clients. In 1793 he was a founding member of the Royal Society of Edinburgh.

He died at his house at Castlehill, Edinburgh on 29 November 1797.

== Family ==
He was married to Helen Gibson (d.1796). They had no children. On his death Haltrees was bequeathed to a son of Sir William Miller baronet and his estate of Cairntows was bequeathed to Henry Dundas.

== Publications ==
- Black Arts
- Accounts of the Chamberlain of Scotland 1329-1331 (1771)
- Charta Willelmi Regis Scotorum, Canonicis de Jedburgh Concessa (1771) engraved by Andrew Bell
- Remarks on some of the Editions of the Acts of Parliament of Scotland (1792)
- Observations on the Regiam Majestatem (1792)

He also worked on the editing of Lord Hailes’ Annals of Scotland (1797)
