= C/1889 O1 (Davidson) =

Non-periodic comet

Discovery
- Discovered by: John Ewen Davidson
- Discovery site: Mackay, Queensland
- Discovery date: 19 July 1889

Designations
- Alternative designations: 1889 IV, 1889e

Orbital characteristics
- Epoch: 17 July 1889 (JD 2411200.5)
- Observation arc: 115 days
- Number of observations: 92
- Aphelion: 869.38 AU
- Perihelion: 1.0397 AU
- Semi-major axis: 435.21 AU
- Eccentricity: 0.997611
- Orbital period: ~9,100 years
- Inclination: 65.992°
- Longitude of ascending node: 287.712°
- Argument of periapsis: 345.862°
- Last perihelion: 19 July 1889
- T_{Jupiter}: 0.526

Physical characteristics
- Comet total magnitude (M1): 6.5
- Comet nuclear magnitude (M2): 5.0–6.0
- Apparent magnitude: 4.0 (1889 apparition)

Comet Davidson, formal designation C/1889 O1, is a non-periodic comet that became visible to the naked eye in 1889.

== Discovery and observations ==
Australian colonist John Ewen Davidson first spotted his comet through a telescope from his personal observatory on the night of 19 July 1889. By coincidence, it is also the day of its perihelion. He later reported his discovery to the Melbourne Observatory on 22 July 1889, noting it as a tail-less object now visible with the naked eye, located within the constellation Centaurus. (Note: Reported initial position upon confirmation was: α = 12^{h} 46^{m} 9^{s}, δ = 122° 29′ 6″) The comet's nucleus was reported to be around magnitude 5.0–6.0, with a coma about 5 arcminutes in diameter.

By 24 July 1889, John Tebbutt reported that the comet brightened to magnitude 4.0, with its nucleus surrounded by an extensive coma. As the comet started to fade away in the following days, it was observed that its nucleus split into two fragments on 3 August 1889.
