= Murray River (Queensland) =

River in Queensland, Australia

- Location of Murray River mouth in Queensland
- Etymology: In honour of John Murray, a Native Police officer

Location
- Country: Australia
- State: Queensland
- Region: Far North Queensland, Wet Tropics of Queensland

Physical characteristics
- Source: Mount Wyruna, Great Dividing Range
  - location: Girringun National Park
  - coordinates: 18°17′59″S 145°59′31″E
  - elevation: 297 m (974 ft)
- Mouth: Coral Sea
  - coordinates: 18°08′49″S 146°02′49″E
  - elevation: 0 m (0 ft)
- Length: 70 km (43 mi)
- Basin size: 555.8 km^{2} (214.6 sq mi)
- Discharge
  - location: Near mouth
  - average: 17.6 m^{3}/s (560 GL/a)

The Murray River is a river in Far North Queensland. It extends for a length of 70 kilometres (43 mi) and drops 297 metres (974 ft) in height from its source in the mountains of Girringun National Park to its mouth on the Queensland coast. It is named after John Murray, who was an officer in the paramilitary Native Police force. British colonists initially named it the Macalister River in 1865, but its appellation was later changed to the Murray River. The Murray Falls is a popular tourist destination in the upper reaches of the river.

The first British surveyors in the area found that the central parts of the river were surrounded by open grassed plains instead of the thick tropical rainforest which was typical of the lowlands in the region. This facilitated the relatively straightforward cultivation of sugar crops in the area, the rich soil being available without having to clear any forest. These plains, which were called the Murray or Bellenden Plains, became the first area of Far North Queensland in which sugarcane was introduced and grown as a cash crop. In 1866, capitalist agriculturalist John Ewen Davidson was the first colonist to plant sugar on these plains located around the Murray River.
