= John Kay (caricaturist) =

British artist (1742–1826)

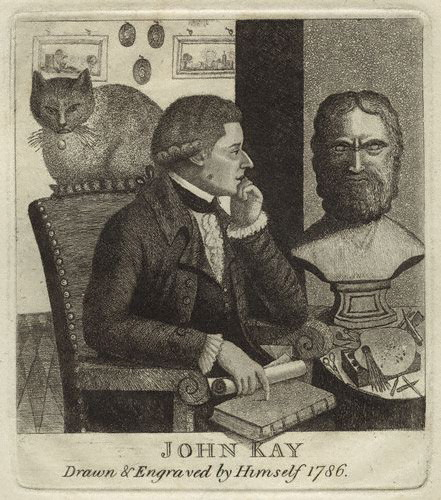
- 1786 self-portrait of Kay
- Born: April 1742; Gibraltar Cottage, near Dalkeith, Scotland
- Died: 21 February 1826 (aged 83); Edinburgh, Scotland
- Education: Self-taught
- Known for: Caricature, engraving, miniature painting
- Notable work: Caricatures of Edinburgh society

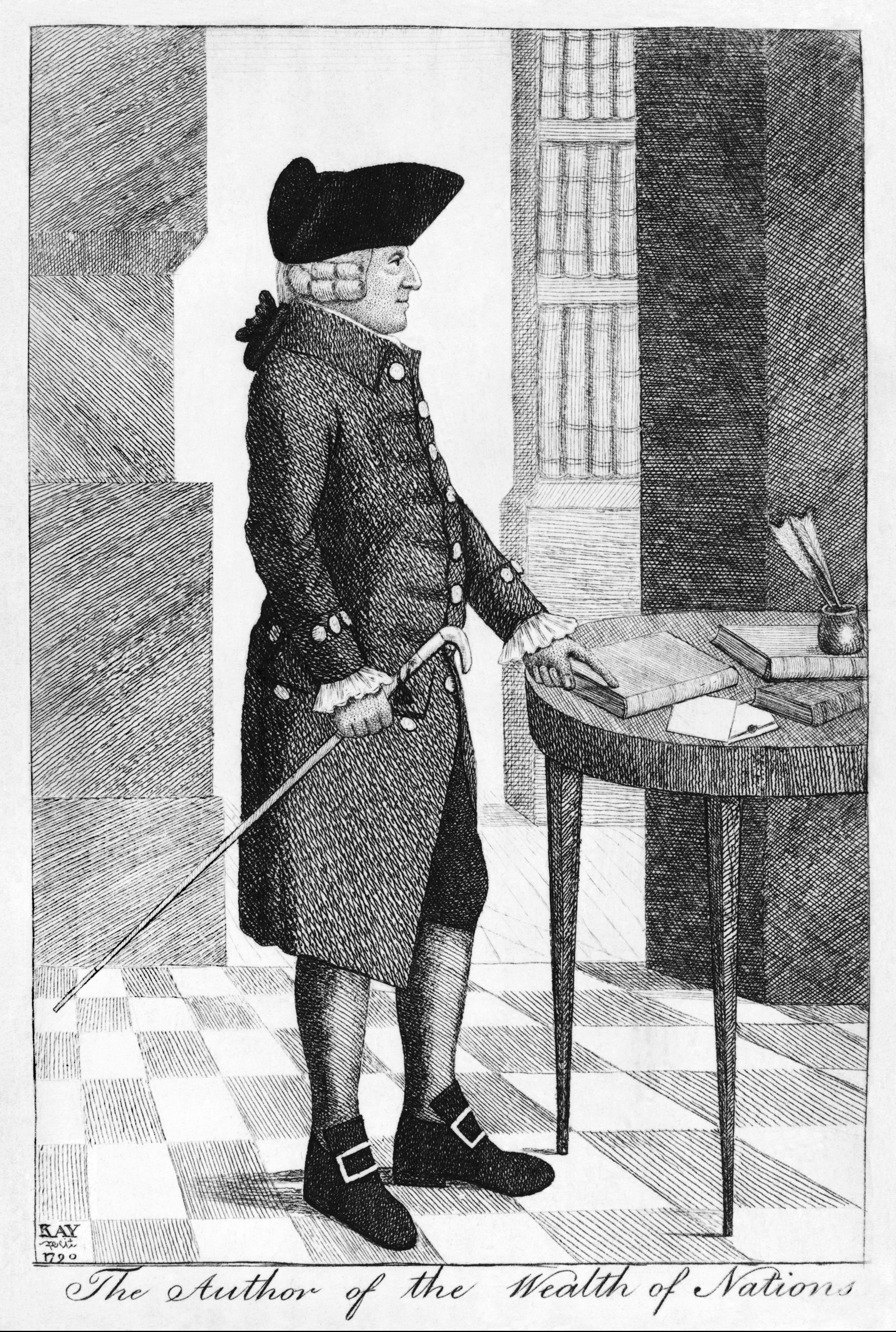
1790 portrait of Adam Smith by Kay

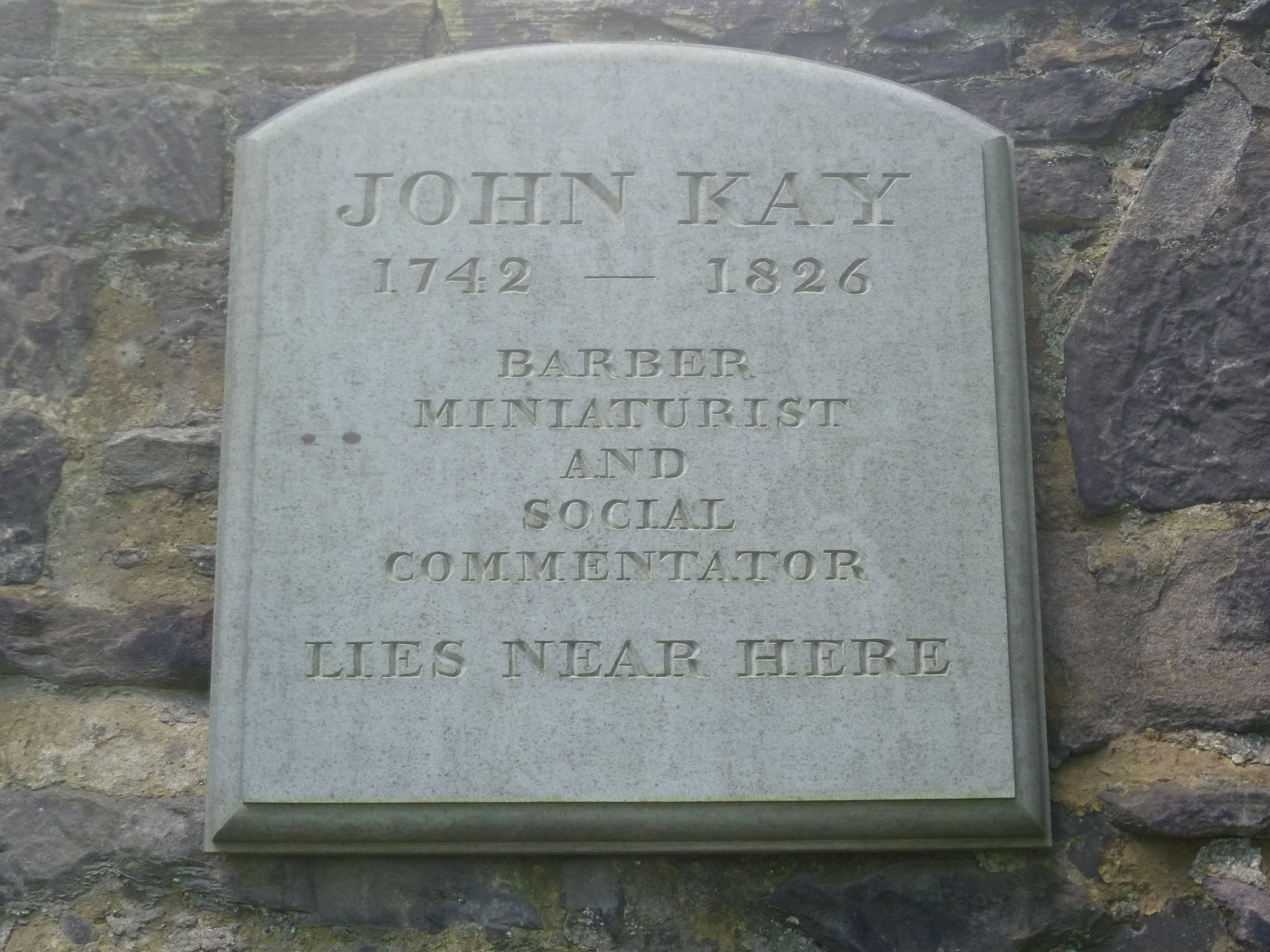
A memorial stone to Kay in Greyfriars Kirkyard

John Kay (April 1742 – 21 February 1826) was a Scottish caricaturist and engraver.

== Life ==
John Kay was born in April 1742 in Gibraltar Cottage just south of Dalkeith, Scotland, where his father, John Kay, worked as a mason. His mother, Helen Alexander, owned several properties in Edinburgh and the Canongate and was relatively wealthy. When his father died in 1748, John was sent to live in Leith, the harbour area of Edinburgh, with some of her relatives, who treated him very badly. At age 13 he returned to Dalkeith where he was apprenticed to George Heriot, a barber in the town, whom he served for six years.

In 1761, he went to Edinburgh, where he served 7 years as a journeyman but not being an Edinburgh citizen had to purchase the freedom to trade as a barber from the Society of Surgeon-Barbers, which he eventually did in December 1771 at age 29, on payment of £40. He then set up business on the High Street in Edinburgh. He had several high ranking clients and made friends with several, notably William Nisbet of Dirleton who became a constant companion.

In 1784, he began engraving his drawings and published his first caricature: James Robertson of Kincraigie, "the daft highland laird". In 1785, induced by the favour which greeted certain attempts of his to etch in aquafortis, he took down his barber's pole and opened a small print shop in Parliament Close. There he continued to flourish, painting miniatures, and publishing at short intervals his sketches and caricatures of local celebrities and oddities, who abounded at that period in Edinburgh society. From 1785 he abandoned his business as barber to concentrate on drawing. This was facilitated by annuities paid to him by Sir Henry Jardine and the estate of William Nisbet.

Kay's portraits were collected by Hugh Paton and published under the title A Series of Original Portraits and Caricature Etchings by the Late John Kay, with Biographical Sketches and Illustrative Anecdotes (Edinburgh, 2 vols. 4to, 1838; 8vo ed., 4 vols., 1842; new 4to ed., with additional plates, 2 vols., 1877), forming a unique record of the social life and popular habits of Edinburgh at its most interesting epoch. Kay's famous shop on the Royal Mile was destroyed during the Great Edinburgh Fire of November 1824.

He died at 227 High Street in Edinburgh and was buried at the north-west corner of Greyfriars Kirkyard. The British Museum has extensive holdings of his works, including two albums apparently assembled by Kay, both described in the Catalogue of Political and Personal Satires Preserved in the Department of Prints and Drawings in the British Museum.

== Family ==
In 1762, he married Lilly Steven by whom he had ten children all of which died young except for one son, William Kay. Lilly died in 1785 and in 1787 Kay married Margaret Scott (d.1835).

== Some persons caricatured by Kay ==
- Hugo Arnot
- Joseph Black
- Hugh Blair
- Claud Irvine Boswell
- John Brown
- James Burnett, Lord Monboddo
- Charles Byrne
- Alexander Carlyle
- James Donaldson
- Henry Dundas, 1st Viscount Melville
- Robert Dundas, 2nd Viscount Melville
- Alexander Gerard
- Alexander Gordon, Lord Rockville
- John Grieve (Lord Provost)
- William "Spread Eagle" Grinly
- Francis Grose
- Henry Home, Lord Kames
- Sir Archibald Hope, 9th Baronet
- John Hope
- James Hutton
- Thomas Jefferson
- Vincenzo Lunardi
- Sam McDonald
- William Nairne, Lord Dunsinane
- George Paton
- Thomas Fyshe Palmer
- William Robertson
- Sarah Siddons
- Adam Smith
- Peter Williamson (Indian Peter)
- Alexander ("Lang Sandy") Wood
