= John Davidson (traveller) =

English traveller in Africa

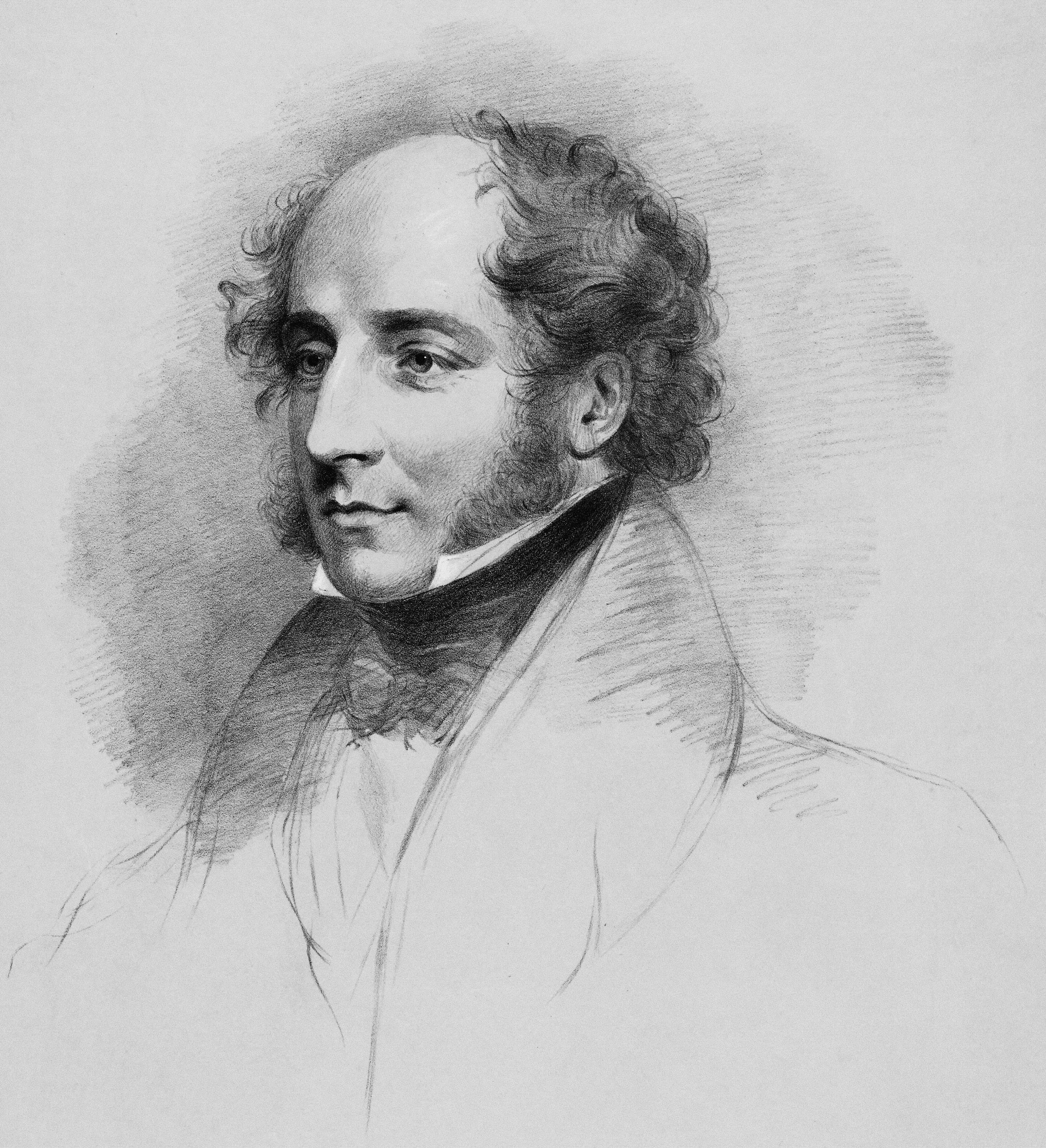
- Born: 23 December 1797; Kelso, Kingdom of Great Britain
- Died: 18 December 1836 (aged 38); Morocco
- Cause of death: Homicide
- Occupation: Traveller
- Known for: Recording his travels around on the African continent

John Davidson (1797–1836) was an English traveller in Africa.

== Early life ==
He was son of a tailor and army clothier in Cork Street, London, and originally from Kelso, and was born on 23 December 1797. He went to school at a private academy near London, and when sixteen years old at his own request was apprenticed to Savory & Moore, the chemists and druggists, in which he later purchased a partnership.

He became a pupil at St George's Hospital, and entered the University of Edinburgh with the intention of becoming a doctor. His health failing, however, he went to Naples in the autumn of 1827. From Naples he went through Styria and Carniola to Vienna, made an excursion through Poland and Russia, and returned home by way of Hamburg.

== Traveller ==
Davidson went to Egypt at the end of 1829, visited the Pyramids, and passed overland to Cosseir, where he embarked for India on his way to China and Persia. An attack of cholera, however, drove him back to Cosseir. He made an excursion through Arabia, and visited Palestine, Syria, the Greek Isles, Athens, and Constantinople. He collected geographical information, which he later communicated to in papers read to the Royal Society and the Royal Institution of London.

In 1831 he went to America, visiting Niagara and the Canadas, New York, New Orleans, Tampico, and Mexico. He visited the Pyramids of Choluteca and took their measurement. Elected a Fellow of the Royal Society in 1832 he settled down for a time to the study of Egyptology. On 13 July 1833 he delivered an address on embalming at the Royal Institution, when he unrolled a mummy for an audience.

He undertook to head an African expedition, at his own expense, and proposed to proceed by way of Fez to Tâfilêlt, and then via the southern slope of Mount Atlas, to Nigritia, across the Sahara. He quit England in August 1835, bound for Timbuctoo. Going to Gibraltar he crossed into Morocco. His medical knowledge was appreciated by officials, and he had difficulty getting permission to depart. He started for the great desert at the end of November 1836, but while stopping at a watering-place called Swekeza he was robbed and murdered on 18 December 1836 by the tribe El Harib.

After Davidson's death his brother printed privately a book, 'Notes taken during Travels in Africa,’ 1839, printed by J. L. Cox. The account of unrolling the mummy at the Royal Institution in 1833 was also published in pamphlet form. Many of his letters from Africa were addressed to the Duke of Sussex (Geog. Soc. Journ. vii. 151).
