= John Davidson (priest) =

Canadian Anglican priest

John Cheyne Davidson was a Canadian Anglican priest in the 20th century.

Davidson was educated at Trinity College, Toronto, and ordained in 1885. After a curacy in Teddington he went out to Colborne Parish, New Brunswick. After that he worked in the Peterborough area from 1888 until 1932: as curate, incumbent and Archdeacon from 1920.
