= Savory & Moore =

Early London pharmacy

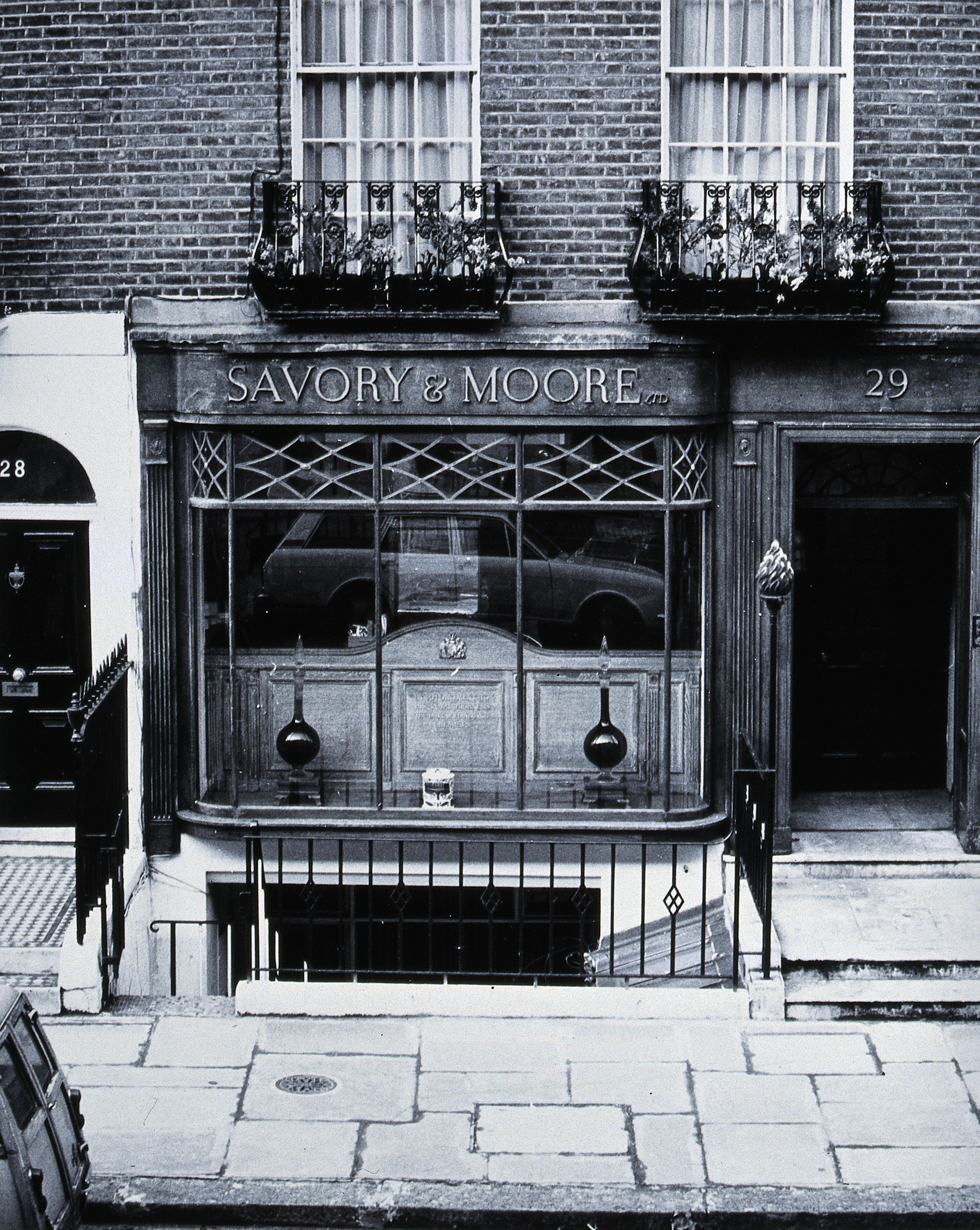
- Frontage at 29 Chapel Street, Belgravia
- Company type: Private
- Industry: Pharmacy, chemists
- Founded: 1794
- Founder: Thomas Field Savory and Thomas Moore

Savory & Moore founded by Thomas Paytherus in 1794 was a pharmacy company that started the business as a chemist shop in London.

== History ==
Thomas Field Savory joined the company in 1797 and in 1806 Thomas Field Savory and Thomas Moore became partners in the company.

With the establishment of the first Savory & Moore pharmacy in 1849, a network of pharmacies established in the United Kingdom which became the official suppliers of the War Office and Royal Family until 20th century.

The company produced patented medicated gelatine lamels, drug-infused gelatine sheets placed on the tongue, from 1915 to 1919.

The shop was closed in 1968 and the fittings and contents were presented to the Wellcome Institute for the History of Medicine. In 1992 Savory & Moore was taken over by Lloyds Pharmacy who now owns all trademarks for the company.

In 1971 the pharmacy's shop structure was transported to Melbourne, Australia at the Medical History Museum of the University of Melbourne, where it was reconstructed and resembles the original pharmacy of London.

== Gallery ==
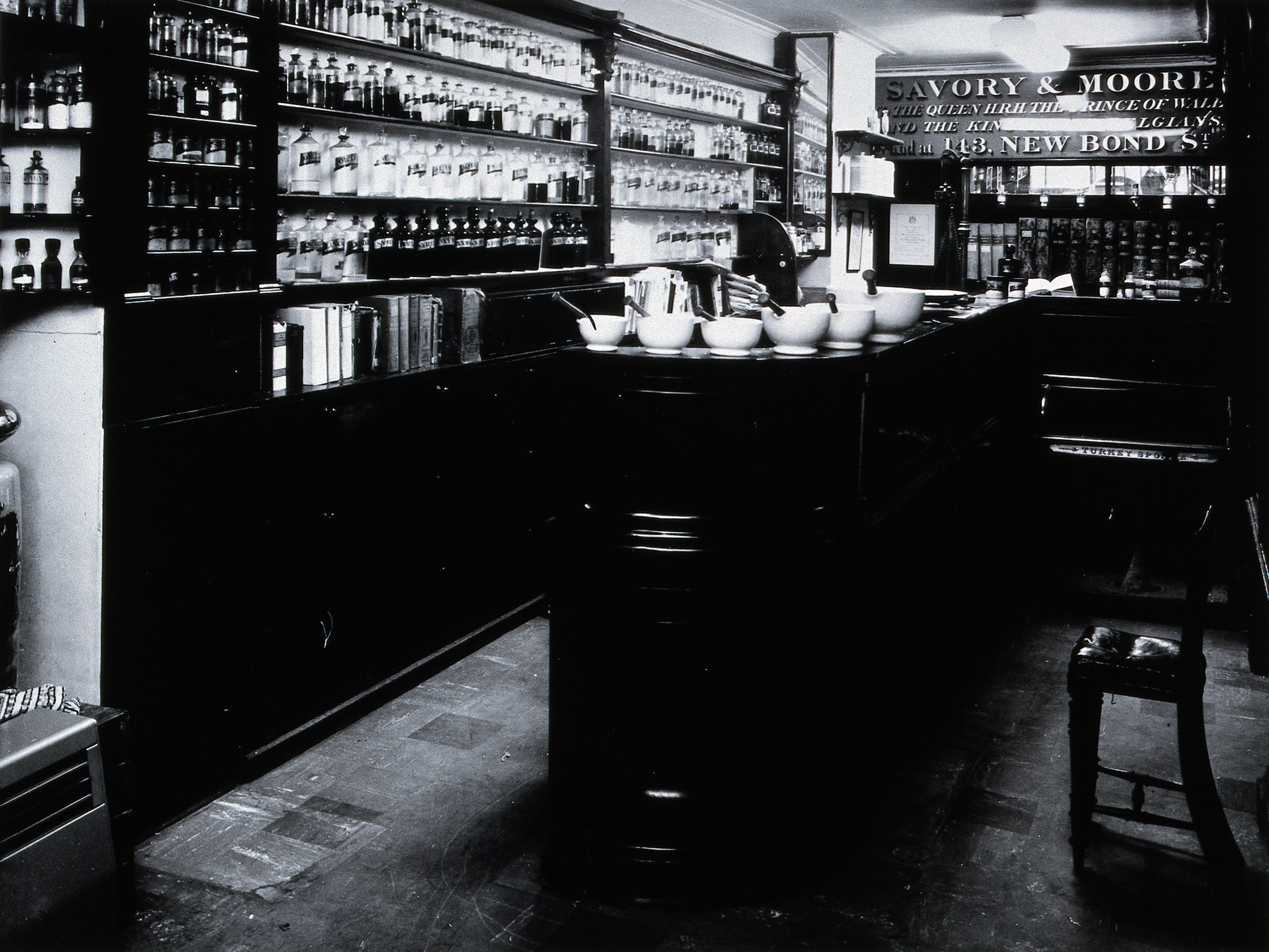
Original pharmacy interior

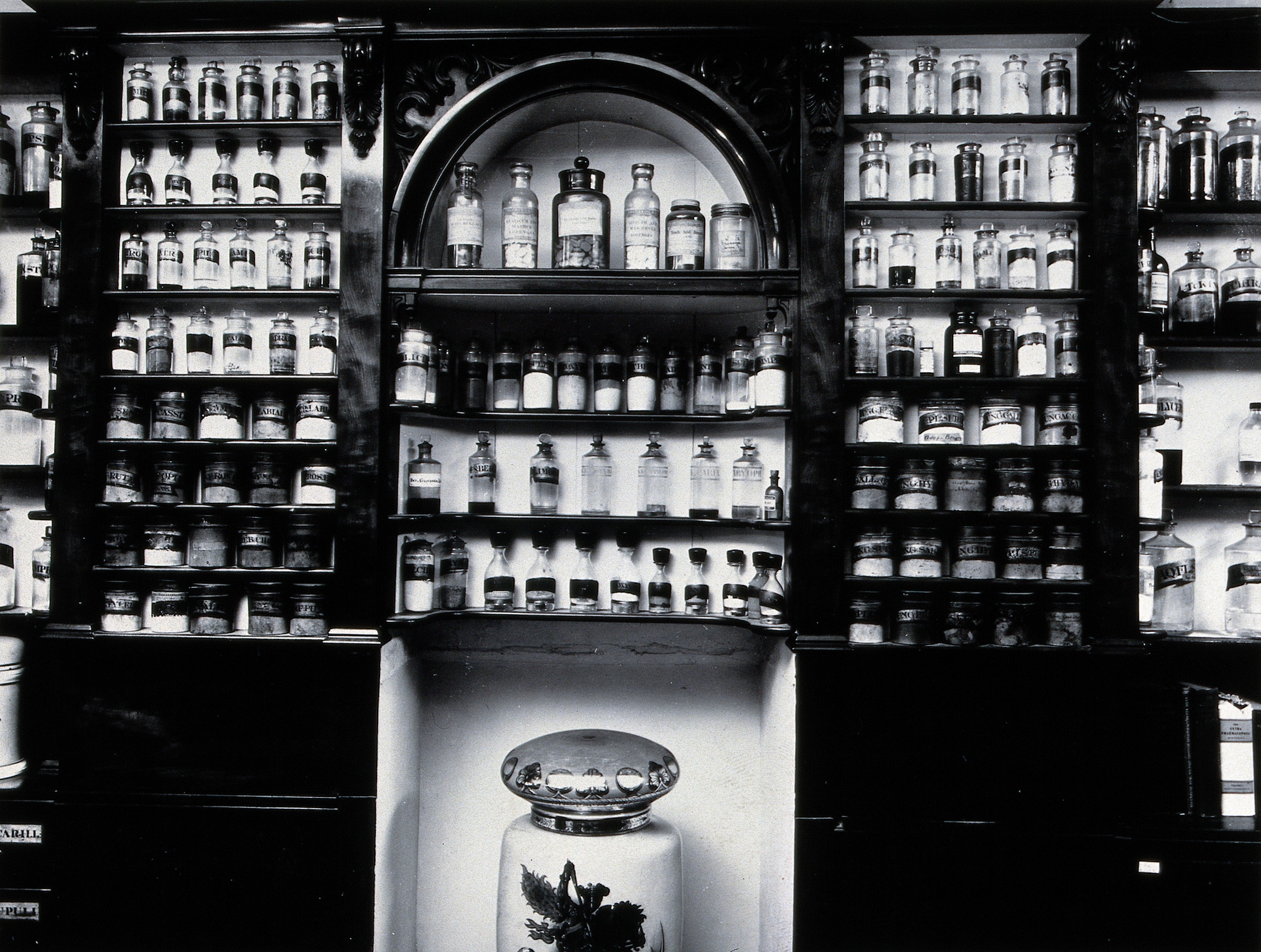
Original pharmacy interior

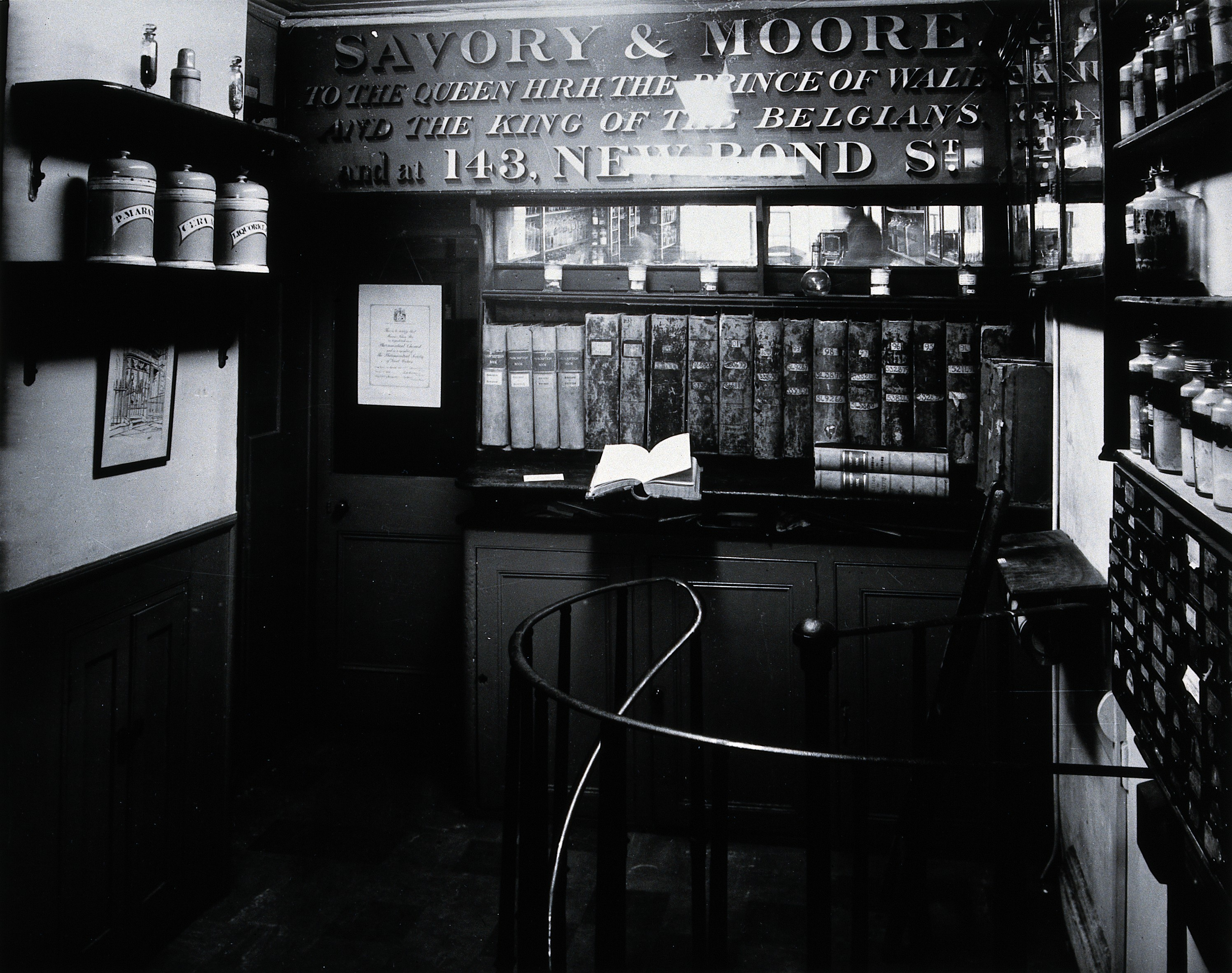
Original pharmacy interior

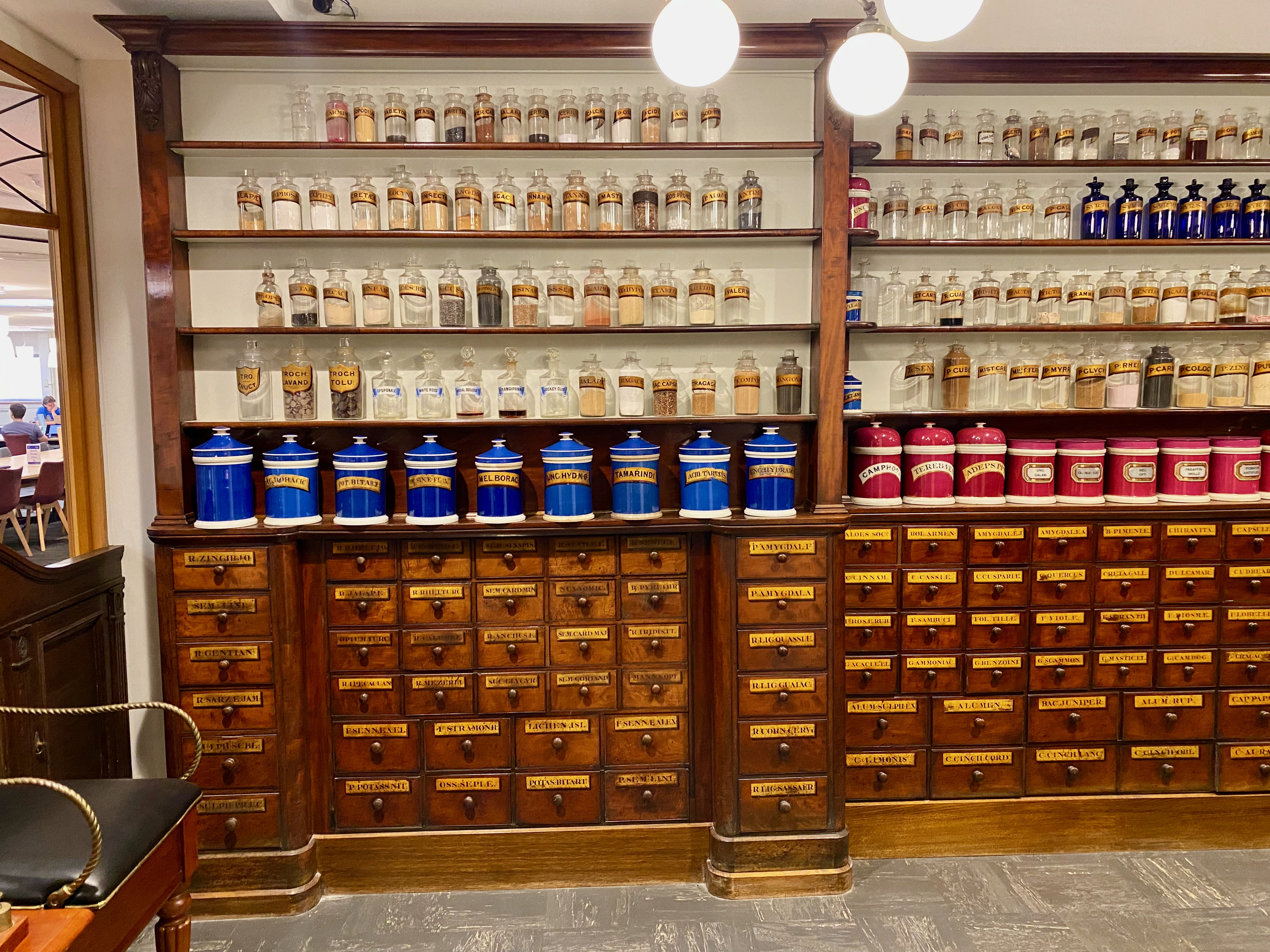
Recreation of pharmacy interior on display at the University of Melbourne

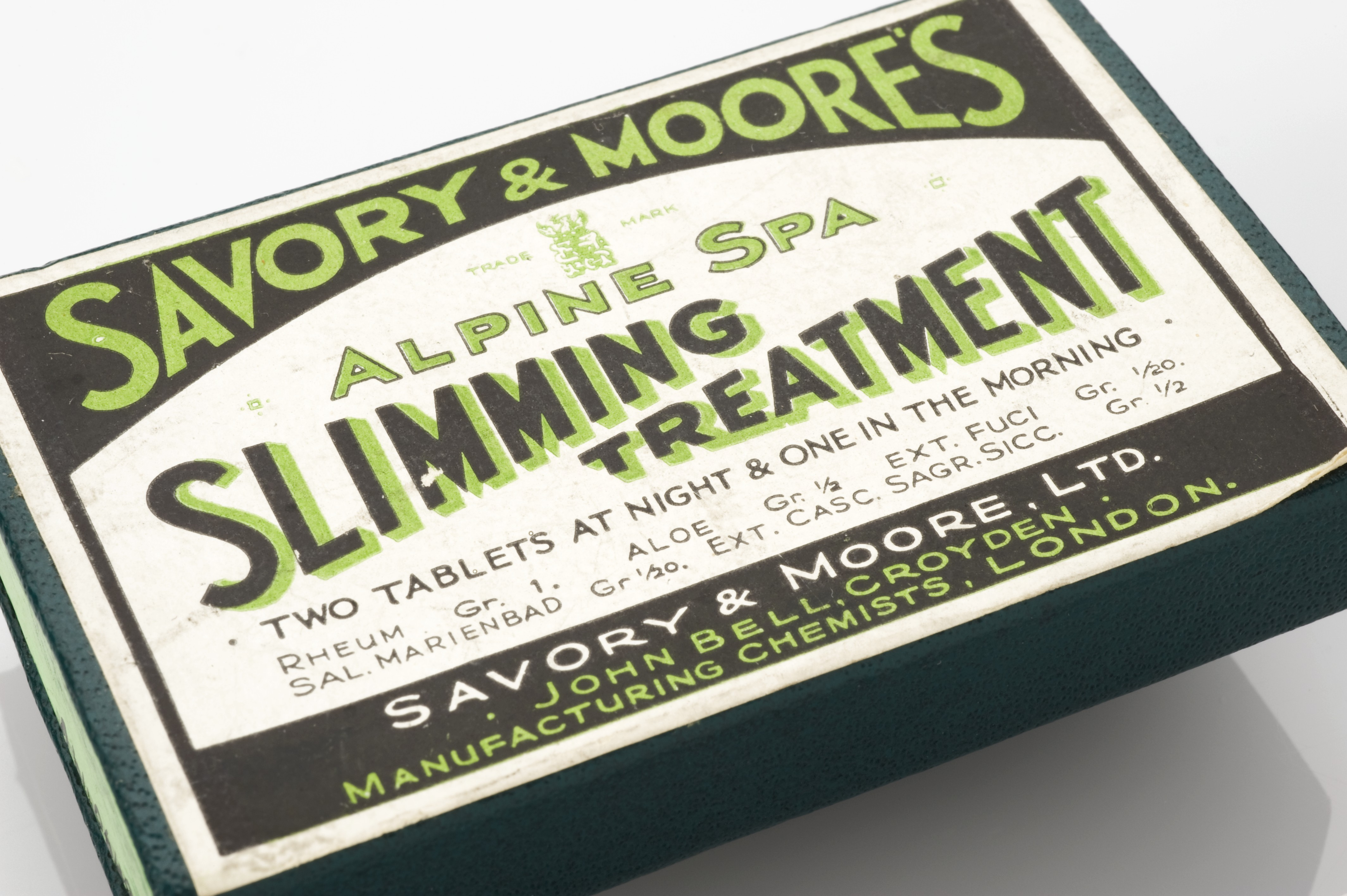

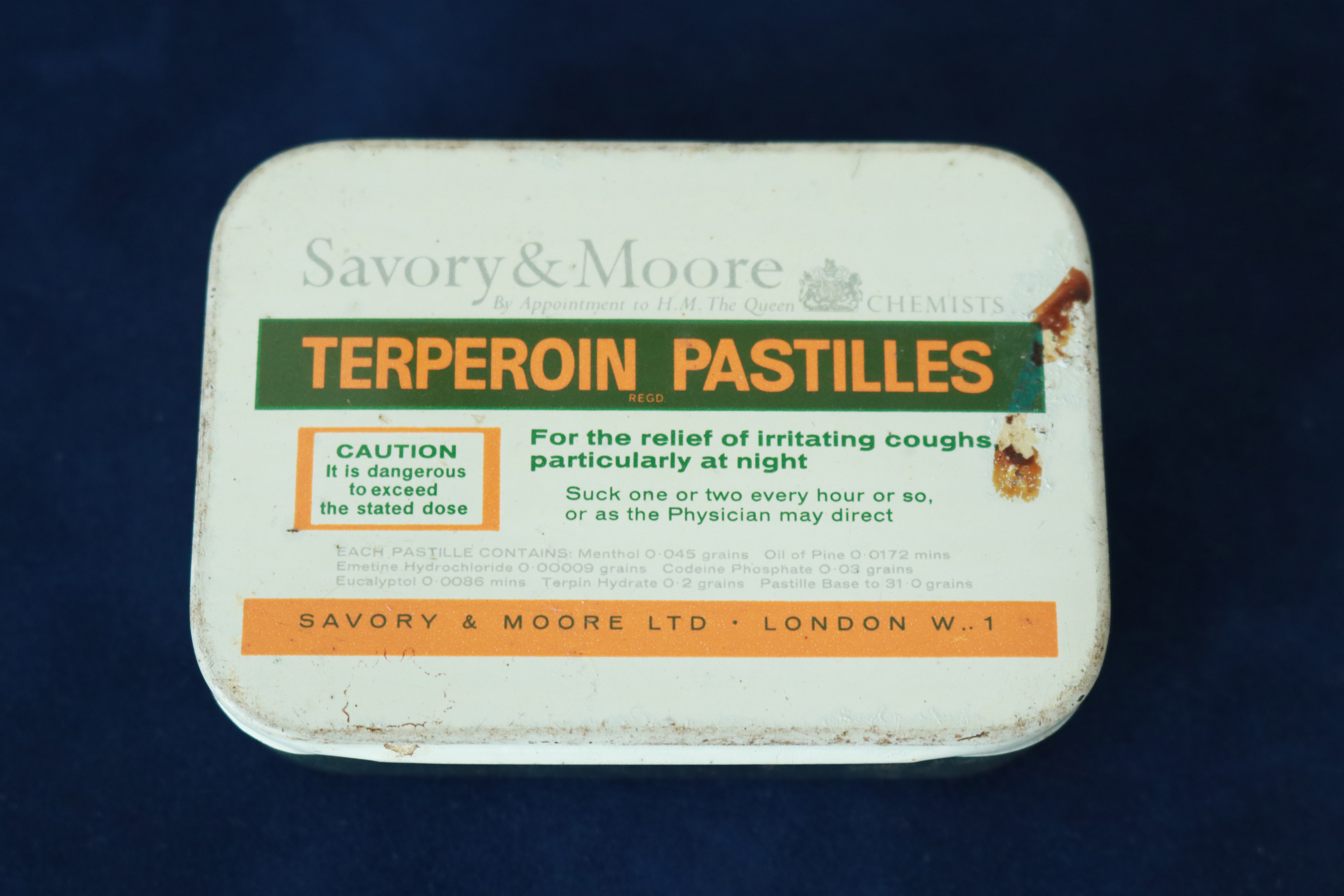

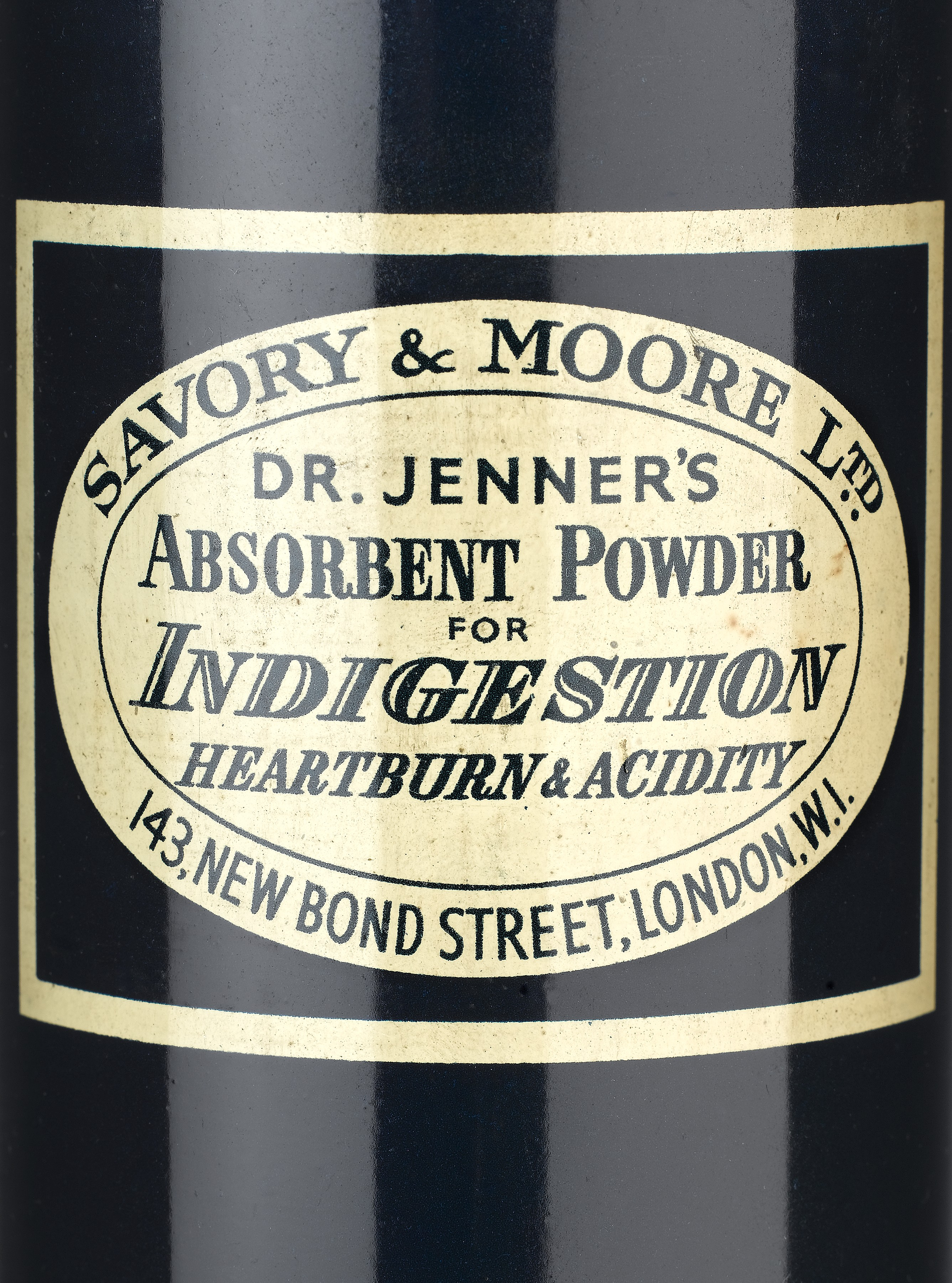
