= George Paton (bibliographer) =

Scottish bibliographer and antiquarian

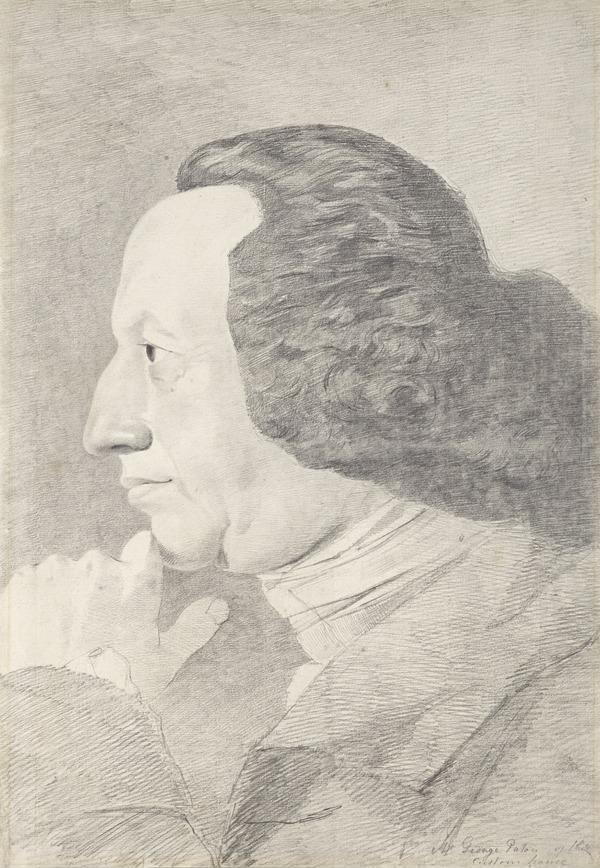
- Paton by John Brown
- Born: 1721
- Died: 5 March 1807 (aged 85–86)
- Occupations: Bibliographer and antiquarian

George Paton (1721 – 5 March 1807) was a Scottish bibliographer and antiquarian.

== Biography ==
Patonwas born in 1721, was the son of John Paton, a bookseller in Old Parliament Square, Edinburgh, his mother being a granddaughter of George Mossman, printer to Queen Anne. After receiving a good education, he became assistant to his father, and ultimately a partner with him in the business; but about 1760 both were compelled to retire on account of having been engaged in a cautionary obligation which they were unable to meet. The son shortly afterwards obtained a clerkship in the custom-house, at first at a salary of only 30l., which was ultimately raised to 70l., but it was subsequently, in accordance with a new ordinance of government, reduced to 55l.

Notwithstanding his meagre income, Paton succeeded by frugal living in acquiring an extensive antiquarian library and a valuable collection of antiquities. He is said to have been in the habit of going to his duties in the custom-house without tasting anything, and to have breakfasted between four and five in the afternoon on a cup of coffee and a slice of bread and butter. In the evening he usually adjourned, with others of similar literary tastes, to John Dowie's tavern, to take his bottle of ale and ‘buffed herring,’ or ‘roasted skate and onions.’ As soon as the clock of St. Giles struck eleven, he rose and retired to his house in Lady Stair's Close. Among others who used to meet him in the tavern was Constable the publisher, who states that he derived from him and David Herd ‘a great deal of information on the subject of books in general, and the literature of Scotland in particular’ (Archibald Constable and his Correspondents, i. 21). Both his library and his antiquarian and topographical knowledge were placed freely at the service both of English and Scottish antiquaries. Gough, in the preface to his second edition of ‘British Topography,’ refers to the valuable assistance he had obtained ‘by the indefatigable attention of his very ingenious and communicative friend, Mr. George Paton of the custom-house, Edinburgh.’ Among others who more or less were indebted to his communications were Lord Hailes, Bishop Percy, Ritson, Pennant, George Chalmers, and David Herd. Two volumes selected from the ‘Paton Correspondence,’ preserved in the Advocates' Library, Edinburgh, have been printed for private circulation—the one consisting of ‘Letters from Joseph Ritson, Esq., to George Paton,’ 1829; and the other of ‘Letters from Thomas Percy, John Callendar of Craigforth, David Herd, and others to George Paton,’ 1830. Two large volumes of Paton's letters to Gough are also in the Advocates' Library, and have not been published. The only independent contribution of Paton to literature is the index to Lindsay of Pitscottie's ‘History of Scotland,’ published in 1788. Although an indefatigable collector of books and antiquities, Paton saved 200l., but lost it after the age of seventy by the failure of the bank of Betham, Gardner, & Co. In 1800 Constable endeavoured to secure the influence of the Duke of Roxburghe on his behalf, but without success (ib. i. 397–9). He died on 5 March 1807, at the age of eighty-seven. (Note: Based on dates provided in the article, this age at death is not possible) His books were sold the same year, the proceeds amounting to 1,358l., and his manuscripts, prints, coins, and antiquities were dispersed in 1811.

There is a portrait of Paton in John Kay's ‘Edinburgh Portraits.’ A small portrait, a private plate, was executed in 1785, and a drawing of him in chalk is preserved by the Antiquarian society of Edinburgh. Two portraits, by John Brown, are in the National Portrait Gallery, Edinburgh.
