= Jon Davison (professor) =

Professor of education, London

Jon Davison

Jon Davison (born 1949 in Bexley, England) was Dean and the first Professor of Teacher Education in the Institute of Education, University of London. He holds degrees from the universities of Exeter and London. He taught in London schools for seventeen years, before becoming a teacher educator in 1992.

For the past twenty-five years his work has been published by Routledge, Taylor and Francis. His research interests include sociolinguistics, the professional formation of teachers and citizenship education. Since 2002, he has been deputy director of the CitizED project and since 2006, he has been chair of the Society of Educational Studies. Davison is a fellow of the Higher Education Academy, the Royal Society of Arts, and the College of Teachers.

In recent years he has been involved in projects researching character in development.
