= John Davison (theologian) =

British theologian and author

John Davison (1793–1863), was a British theologian and author of Considerations on the Poor Laws.
