= John Davidson (cricketer, born 1804) =

Scottish cricketer

Cricket information
- Role: Occasional wicketkeeper

Domestic team information
- Years: Team
- 1830–1835: Marylebone Cricket Club
- 1828: Hampshire

Career statistics
Competition	First-class
Matches	6
Runs scored	63
Batting average	7.00
100s/50s	–/–
Top score	18
Balls bowled	–
Wickets	–
Bowling average	–
5 wickets in innings	–
10 wickets in match	–
Best bowling	–
Catches/stumpings	–/4
- Source: Cricinfo, 15 February 2010

John Davidson (born 1804 in Edinburgh; died 28 April 1898 at Eastbourne, Sussex) was an amateur Scottish first-class cricketer who played occasionally as a wicketkeeper. He made his first-class debut for Hampshire in a single match in 1828 against an England team.

In 1830 Davidson made his debut for Marylebone Cricket Club (MCC) against Middlesex. From 1830 to 1835 Davidson played in four first-class matches for the club, with his final match for the club coming against Sussex.

Davidson played his final first-class match in 1845 for Petworth Cricket Club when they played Hampshire.

Davidson died at Eastbourne, Sussex on 28 April 1898.
