= John Murray (native police officer) =

Scottish officer in the Australian native police

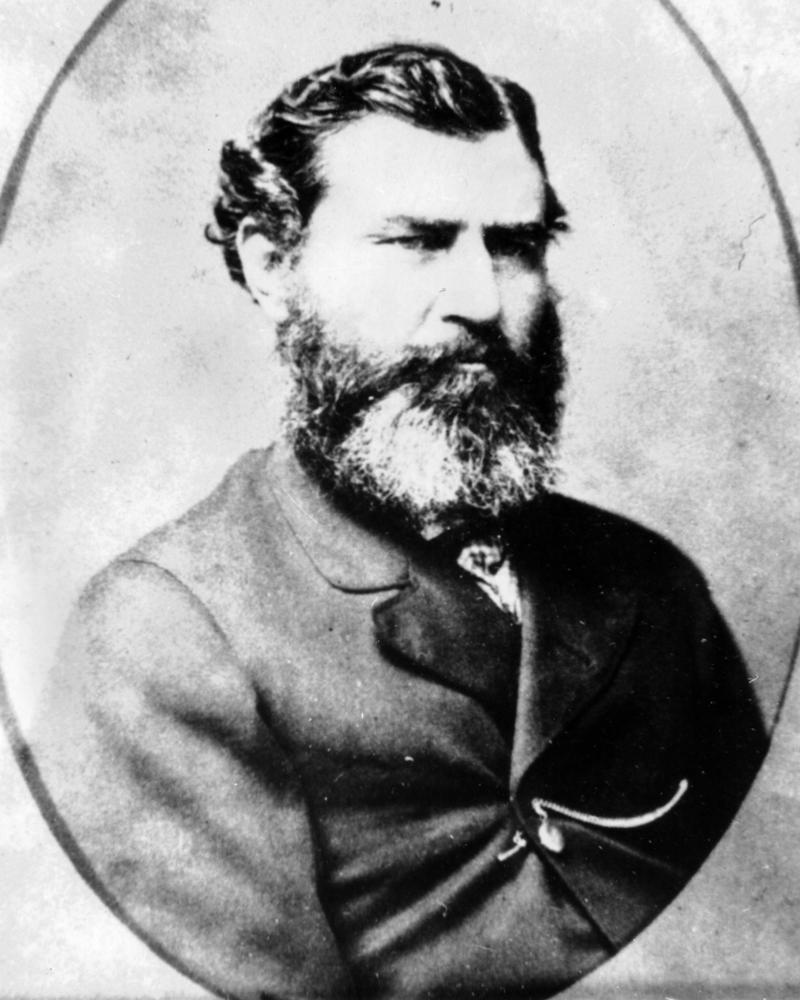
John Murray, Native Police officer, c. 1866

John Murray (23 February 1827 – 30 July 1876) was a Scottish officer in the Australian native police in the British colonies of New South Wales and Queensland. He was an integral part of this paramilitary force for nearly twenty years, supporting European colonisation in south-eastern, central and northern Queensland. He also had a role in recruiting troopers for the Native Police from the Riverina District in New South Wales.

== Early life ==
John Murray was born on 23 February 1827 at his family's Georgefield estate near Langholm in southern Scotland. His grandfather was Lieutenant Colonel Matthew Murray of the East India Company who married a Malayali woman named Contity from Kerala while in India. The offspring of this marriage, including John's father James Murray, were collectively dubbed the "Black Murrays" on account of their darker skin colour.

In 1843, at the age of sixteen, John Murray arrived in New South Wales with his parents and siblings. After initially living in Sydney, John's father chose to become a pastoralist, moving his family to the Warrawang property at Mt Lambie near Bathurst.

== Squatter ==
Around 1848, John Murray decided to become a pastoral squatter in his own right and chose to go to the frontier region of Wide Bay-Burnett in the north of the colony to obtain land. Murray occupied the Woolooga run about 40 kilometers west of Gympie. To the south was Widgee Widgee taken up by the Tooth brothers, to the south-west Kilkivan occupied by J D MacTaggart, further south was John Mortimer on Manumbar- who unlike Murray and many of his neighbours enjoyed a good relationship with local Aboriginal people- and to the north-west was Henry Cox Corfield's Gigoomgan run.

On 7 June 1852 Murray's sister Jessie married his neighbour Henry Cox Corfield, by which time Corfield had sold out his Gigoomgan run and moved further north to Teebar, 50 kilometers west of Maryborough. It is here in 1853 that Jessie Murray Cox Corfield died- probably in childbirth- and was buried on the property.

Both Pedley and Logan write that Woolooga was occupied by the Murray brothers (John and James) from the late 1840s. Pedley also writes that it was John Murray's brother who Murray referred to in May 1849 when he wrote an appeal for help to his Kilkivan neighbour MacTaggart, hastily scrawled on the fly leaf of a book, "Dear MacTaggart, make all haste. Frank is dead and a lot of sheep taken. J Murray." Official correspondence gives the name as Francis Callaghan and Murray, in his deposition in December 1850, does not mention that James was his brother.

It would appear that neither of the Murray brothers ever legitimised their occupation of Woolooga. As such, unlike their brother in law Corfield, they were unable to sell the property and simply had to walk away. Before that occurred a stroke of fortune befell John Murray that would lead to a career lasting the next 19 years.

In November 1850, the Native Police started to enter the Wide Bay area. Lieutenant Richard Marshall was stationed on Woolooga and he and John Murray seem to have struck up a mutually supportive financial, military, and media relationship,. In December Lieutenant George Fulford also arrived and was stationed at Gigoomgan. Marshall and Fulford, with the aid of armed settlers including John Murray and H.C. Corfield, conducted attacks against local Aboriginals.

Murray described one of these attacks in a letter to the Sydney Morning Herald. He wrote that on 14 December, he participated in attacks led by Marshall and his troopers upon the Aboriginal owners of Widgee and Kilkivan. At the conclusion of the attacks, lasting more than an hour, Murray stated that "the blacks suffered severely" and that they had been "taught a lesson which will show them their inferiority in war". He went on the laud the NMP writing "The duties of the native police are most arduous and the squatters are unanimous in saying that the officers are very ill paid for the hard and dangerous service in which they are employed. Surely, from the large funds paid by the squatters (but not by Murray, obviously) to the government a considerable increase in salary might be afforded."

Interestingly, that exact same sentiment that Murray had included in his SMH letter, "inferiority in war", was also used by MacTaggart of Kilkivan and by Arthur Brown, in depositions sworn at Woolooga before R. P. Marshall J.P. aka Lieutenant Marshall of the NMP. It would appear that Murray, Marshall and MacTaggart were conspiring in the evidence that they were providing to the Crown and the media.

The obvious problem that arises from the language of Murray et al. of making war against the Aboriginal owners of the land is that the owners of the land were simply not permitted to wage war in return. The moment Australia was claimed for the Crown, all Aboriginal inhabitants became subjects, not foreign combatants, and the laws of war and its protections were not extended to them. Any resistance to European colonisation was couched in terms of criminal behaviour, while those responsible for enforcing colonial law, the Native Mounted Police, were frequently brutal in their treatment of Aboriginal prisoners.

Moreover, from 1848/9 the Crown had insisted that all leases must be predicated on dual use. Aboriginal rights to continue their traditional way of life were a requirement of European occupation. Hence, denial of these inherent rights by definition violated the terms of the lease agreement. The shooting of Aboriginal people en masse by Murray and his neighbours and driving them from their lands would constitute denial of rights of use.

Having thus established good relationships with NMP officers Marshall and Fulford, having publicly praised Commandant Walker and the NMP, and having proven himself capable of carrying out the work of teaching Aboriginal people "their inferiority in war" Murray was appointed as an officer in the NMP, where for the next 19 years he would perpetrate one massacre after another across Queensland.

== Joins Native Police ==
Even though it appears that Murray lived on Woolooga up to 1852, he had never met the conditions to hold the rights to the property and in late 1850 it was declared a vacant run. In February 1852, in addition to being appointed as a government magistrate at Gayndah, Murray, on the recommendation of Frederick Walker, was also appointed as Lieutenant of the 4th Division of the Native Police which covered the Wide Bay-Burnett district.

Murray was initially posted to the Dawson River region where he and his troopers were affected heavily by illness. Due to this, Murray was unable to conduct punitive missions against Aboriginals over the killing of squatter Adolphus Trevethan at Rawbelle in March 1852. Lieutenant Marshall eventually carried out this operation a month later. In August 1852, Murray and his division shot dead at least three Aboriginals in the Upper Burnett River who had allegedly murdered a shepherd under the employ of James Mackay. In September, a number of Native Police under Murray, killed a number of Aboriginals at Hawkwood after Murray attempted to seized eight or nine of them and they rushed the troopers and tried to pull them off their horses. He was, at this time, also involved in arresting recalcitrant and absconding imported Chinese "coolie" labourers for the European pastoralists in the area. Ironically, William Powell, the first legal occupier of Woolooga, complained that Aboriginal people there were helping indentured workers on the stations to abscond.

By May 1853, newspaper columnists exalted the efforts of Lieutenants Murray and Marshall in subduing legitimate Aboriginal resistance in the Burnett region "...these courageous and indefatigable officers marched their men, subduing tribe after tribe, recovering thousands of sheep, carried away by the wild savage. Protecting one station from incendiarism, another from murder, taking and shooting hosts of murderers, never stopping, never tiring, until every station in the Burnet district was as secure as those within 100 miles of Sydney, ".

== Deployment to Port Curtis ==
In November 1853, Murray with twelve troopers arrived at Port Curtis to protect the formation of the township of Gladstone. Prominent squatter James Leith Hay, accompanied by Native Police Commandant Frederick Walker, overlanded to the settlement not long after with what was supposed to be the first bales of wool to be shipped from the new port, but these had been destroyed by Aboriginals along the way. Walker had advised Murray to establish a barracks for the Native Police at Auckland Creek near the projected town of Gladstone, as this area had a reliable source of water.

Just as he would on the Calliope River, at Murray Lagoon in Rockhampton and later at the convergence of Attie and Meunga Creeks near Cardwell, the place that Murray chose to establish his base was an area àbout 3 miles upstream in Auckland Creek, beyond a natural causeway which marked the dividing line between salt and fresh water. Here a natural fresh water lagoon, the Thirty Foot Waterhole, provided Murray with a reliable supply of fresh water. In the process, Murray, like a medieval crusader building a castle to dominate a trade route, was able to control the landscape and deny to the indigenous owners of the land the use of a vital economic asset; the water, fish, fowl, tortoises, plant life and game that was attracted to the area. As the Gladstone regional Council states on the signs erected at the Lions Park at Police Creek, "As a dependable freshwater reserve in one of the driest coastal regions in the land this waterhole was important to local Aboriginal people for many generations prior European settlement. As their traditional lands and ways of life were gradually lost, the waterhole served as an important camp-site in the early years of colonial settlement." The usurpation of such a vital economic resource is, by definition, conflict. (Signage at Lions Park, Police Creek. Gladstone Regional Council.)

To their eternal credit, the Gladstone Council goes further, detailing the impact of the Murray's NMP. It is worth quoting at length because it is one of the truly rare instances where there is any in situ acknowledgement of the existence and impact of the NMP. The Council writes, "Who were the Native Mounted Police? The influx of colonial settlers in the 1800's sparked conflict with many Indigenous groups who sought to protect their land and livelihood. The Native Mounted Police were established to address the problem and pave the way for colonial settlement. A Native Mounted troop typically comprised 12 Aboriginal troopers under the command of three white officers. They were appointed by the government of the day, trained in horsemanship, and the use of firearms, and issued with uniforms, rifles, pistols and swords. The Aboriginal troopers were recruited from distant tribes and put to work in regions where they had no connection with the local Indigenous people- who they saw as traditional enemies rather than fellow countrymen. While the role of the Native Police was officially to "pacify" or "disperse" Aboriginal people, in reality they were closer to a paramilitary force. The Native Mounted Police were responsible for several massacres in the Gladstone region. Though conducted in response to Aboriginal resistance and attacks on settlers, the Native Police were indiscriminate in their retribution- killing men, women and children. Though not documented, Aboriginal people have long spoken of a massacre that took place near here in the mid 1800's." (Signage at Lions Park, Police Creek. Gladstone Regional Council.)

In February 1854, Murray reported that his sergeant and two troopers were attacked by Aboriginal people as they were marking a tree line between Port Curtis and Traylan. The group was sleeping and encamped when they were attacked. Injuries included severe cuts on their heads and a trooper being speared in the chest but he recovered from the wound.

In early 1854 Murray was with the government surveyor, Francis McCabe on what would later be named the Calliope River. According to a monument erected at the Calliope Historical Village by the Institute of Surveyor's as part of the Bicentennial celebrations, McCabe was camped 1 mile (1.6km) downstream. Murray and his NMP death squad were camped about a mile upstream on the opposite bank at a small freshwater lagoon between Ogre and Calligooran Creeks.

On 4 February 1854 Charles Arthur, one of McCabe's party, recorded in his diary that Aboriginal people had cooeed to them from the opposite bank, making it clear, he wrote, that it was "their ground". Arthur wrote that they called out the name Wilmott which he believed meant that they were from Auckland Point, as Wilmott was a hotelier at Barney Point and it was the habit of local Aboriginals to call his name. At this point there was no violence.

It appears that although McCabe had been encamped on the river since October the previous year, this was the first contact he had with the local owners. The nature of the contact, cooeeing from the opposite bank and calling out the name Willmott, suggests that it was done in a friendly manner, as in Aboriginal society it is considered polite to announce oneself.

In response, the NMP were called and Sgt Humphries and two troopers came over. Arthur writes that they began watching.

Four days later, on 8 March, Murray's NMP troopers captured and handcuffed four Aboriginal men somewhere in the vicinity of McCabe's camp. The next morning it was said that they had escaped during the night so the NMP tracked them and executed them before breakfast. Of course, to shoot four naked, unarmed, handcuffed men before breakfast is simply cold blooded murder.

A month later, on 4 March 1854, 20 Aboriginal men raided McCabe's camp stealing some possessions including handkerchiefs, a vest and two tin plates. One of McCabe's men, Sheriss, was speared in the leg during the attack. In Aboriginal customary law spearing in the leg is a punishment for serious crimes and was perhaps done as punishment for the four Aboriginal men murdered by Murray a month before.

In response, Murray and the NMP death squad pursued the attackers to Farmer's Island, located about 600 metres upstream from McCabe's camp, and shot them while swimming across the river, killing two and wounding others. Arthur recorded in his diary "Sunday 5th of March Mr Murray and the police returned about 1 p.M - they fell in with the blacks yesterday evening and they got on them...They surrounded them in a scrub and I believe (as Mr Murray says) that only one out of (22) twenty two got away to tell the tale- so that altogether they have shot dead 23 Blacks concerning the robbery of our camps and perhaps may have wounded some more." Twenty seven dead including the four men executed a month before.

Murray, with his sergeant and troopers, recovered most of the stolen equipment. The assistant surveyor's jacket, which was taken during the ransack of his camp, was returned to him covered in blood.

A gentleman who visited Port Curtis in 1854 noted that the indigenous population stayed away from the township due to a "terror of the Native Police". Murray's troopers also acted as the early postal service from Port Curtis to the main barracks at Traylan near Eidsvold

In April 1854, the fledgling settlement was visited by Sir Charles Augustus Fitzroy, the Governor of New South Wales, who arrived on the 28-gun naval corvette HMS Calliope. Murray and his troopers paraded for the Queen's representative, who in return, inspected the newly constructed Native Police barracks. During the visit of the Governor, Captain John Coghlan Fitzgerald of HMS Calliope wrote in his private diary on 19 April of the killing of Aboriginal people by Murray and his troopers the previous month, "Mr McCabe's party was attacked a short time since, and a man speared. The Native Police followed up, and it is said, killed 23. Plunder is, of course, their object, but they will take the life of a white man whenever they can do it with impunity. Hence a constant warfare, and Externination will, of course, be the Result."

Fitzgerald 's words were to prove all too prescient. Repeated massacres, violence and disease took a devastating toll on the Tulua people whose country stretched from the Calliope River south to the Boyne and east to Barney Point. In 1887 E M Curr wrote that of an estimated pre European population of 700, by 1882 a mere 43 Tulua were left alive.

And while the term genocide was not coined by Raphael Lemkin until the 1940's and genocide was not written into international law until the adoption of the Genocide Convention on 12 January 1951, and thus Murray cannot be accused of perpetrating genocide in law, given that the Convention states specifically that "Recognising that at all periods of human history genocide has inflicted great losses on humanity." what Murray and his fellow NMP officers did was certainly genocide in deed.

The Calliope River near Gladstone was also named at this time in honour of the Governor's ship.

In 1853, squatter John Little arrived from New South Wales with his family and herds of sheep at his selection named Rosedale north of Bundaberg. According to the son of John Little, "Night after night we had to spend with the sheep to prevent them being stolen by the blacks, who had to be kept at a safe distance by gun fire" On one punitive mission, the Aboriginals managed to disappear around the estuary north of Rosedale and "being baffled" by them, the creek was named Baffle Creek.

Murray married Rachael Little. Subsequently, an Aboriginal baby, later named Jimmy Possum, was retrieved from a hollow log following a massacre by the police and adopted by the Murray family. Jimmy Possum became a stockman on Little's property.

In the second half of 1854 Murray's command suffered two crises. First Commander Walker suspended Murray for reasons unknown, although alcoholism and insobriety on duty did plague Murray's career. When Walker himself was suspended, his temporary replacement, Lt Walker, reinstated Murray.

Upon his return to duty Murray advised Captain Maurice O'Connell, the government resident at Gladstone, that his entire troop of twelve men were intending to leave. The Aboriginal troopers, having been recruited by Commandant Frederick Walker, felt that their commitment was to him and that now that he was no longer in charge they wished to return to their country and family. The men said that 'They were getting too far from their country and that they were anxious to see their relatives and friends'

O'Connell arranged for Murray to parade his troops, and O'Connell, dressed in his military uniform, addressed the troopers and informed them that it wasn't Walker who had paid them and fed and clothed them but rather the government, and that now, after their five years of loyal service, that same government was at war with other white people- Russia- and they were the only force capable of defending the coastline should Russia invade.

At that point O'Connell gave the men an undertaking that once the crisis had passed they would be given the means and allowed to return to their country, a commitment he was not empowered to give. Subsequently he wrote to the Colonial Secretary asking that his word be honoured and that the men be given furlough to return to their homes. Yet by 1857 O'Connell would still write in despair, "For two years however they have continued to serve without murmur or dissatisfaction until as I am now informed sometime towards the end of the last year they demanded what was substantially the fulfilment of their contract and were from the Fitzroy River sent in disgrace by Mr Murray to Rannes...I confess I am deeply grieved and hurt I should have been implicated in a transaction which bears all the aspect of being a gross breach of public faith and honour and I appeal to you Sir, to remedy as far as it is possible now so to do, the injustice which has been committed...At any rate they had the faith of the Government of New South Wales pledged to a compliance with it and the two years which had elapsed since the guarantee was formally communicated to them through me—measures ought to have been adopted to meet the emergency which evidently was daily imminent.. I trust also that in vindication of the public faith of this Colony Lieut Murray may be called upon to justify the measures he has adopted." It appears that this commitment was never honoured.

By September 1854, Murray resigned from the force while his position as head of Native Police at Port Curtis was filled by Sergeant Humphries. Two months later Murray had returned to the Native Police as a 3rd Lieutenant at the Gladstone division. On 28 September Murray was authorised to proceed to Rannes after sub-Lieutenant Walker's section of Native Police was attacked by a large number of Aboriginal men on the night of 23 September at Rannes, which resulted in the deaths of 3 troopers.

In 1857, Murray wrote to John Wickham regarding the desertion of his troop in 1856. In the correspondence Murray dismissed O'Connell's promise of return to country, stating that the men who had abandoned him "had no guarantee, so far as I am aware, from the government of assistance to enable them to return to their own country...," with the exception of two troopers who had been given horses and an escort to the Condamine region. Murray insisted that there was no compact of return entered into at the time of enlistment and that when his men had come to speak to him they were unaware of any compact but had merely expressed homesickness and that he had assured them that at the end of the year, if he had been able to procure more recruits, they would be allowed to leave. He claimed that they had agreed but "broke their faith and at a moments notice insisted on leaving."

Murray claimed, disingenuously, that of the twelve troopers, two had only to travel to Wandai Gumbal (Condamine) to be "amongst their own people", without mentioning that the rest of his command came from the Murray area in Victoria. In fact, it would seem that those troopers were prevented from returning to their country and that it was only in 1864, after 16 years of continuous service, when Murray needed them in the Echuca area to recruit more troops, that the four surviving original troopers were finally allowed to return home.

== Severe punitive operations ==
On Boxing Day of 1855, five workers on William Young's newly formed property at Mount Larcombe 25 kilometres from Gladstone, were killed by Aboriginals. Subsequently it was suggested that at least part of the motivation for the attack was a previous incident in which NMP troopers had shot at Aboriginal people. That incident involved Trooper Toby who was later implicated in the rape and murder of Fanny Briggs. Skinner writes that, "Murray stated it was difficult to find out the reasons for the Aborigines attacking Young's station. There were other circumstances besides their being fired at by the police. There had been a quarrel between Aborigines and some of the white men from Sydney who probably did not understand their ways. Murray had been told by Young himself that Young had quarrelled with an Aborigine, kicked him, and taken a double-barrelled gun to him simply because he did not leave the door of the hut immediately when spoken to. Murray had cautioned Young frequently with regard to the latter's treatment of Aborigines. During shearing, Young had 'obtained as much work from them as possible and when he had done with them, drove them away' ".

Young, who was in Gladstone for Christmas, heard about the massacre not long after and the Native Police under Lieutenant Murray were called upon for assistance. During the first few weeks of 1856, Murray conducted three large and well organised massacres of Aboriginals to the north of Gladstone. Murray, his troopers, together with local constables and several volunteer squatters from the area formed a force of more than twenty well armed people which tracked down a large group of about 200 Aboriginals camped near what is now the township of Raglan. This community was quietly surrounded in the evening and at daybreak of the following morning the Aboriginals were shot down as they awoke. Only a minority managed to escape the slaughter, fleeing toward the coast at Keppel Bay. These survivors were followed up in a second raid by Murray and either shot down or driven into the ocean. Hourigan's Creek (which now runs along the boundary of a shooting range at Raglan) is named after John Hourigan, a district constable at Gladstone, who fired the first shot in the initial massacre. A visitor to the Raglan homestead, built not long after the killings, recalled how a large garden bed was constructed with an ornate border of Aboriginal skulls.

The third reprisal involved Murray travelling further north to the Archer brothers' newly formed pastoral run at Gracemere on the Fitzroy River. Charles Archer augmented Murray's contingent of troopers with some armed Aboriginals that were on good terms with the squatters. This combined force then proceeded across the river and dealt out summary justice which resulted in the deaths of fourteen or more Aboriginals who resided in that vicinity. Murray and his combined force had surrounded their camp at Nankin Creek in the evening and then attacked it at dawn.

Two other massacres were reported to have been perpetrated by Murray in the aftermath of the Mt Larcombe massacre. The first occurred at Wilmot Lagoon, approximately one kilometre east of the current town of Mt Larcombe. One group of Aboriginal people was immediately tracked to the lagoon where they were in the process of roasting some sheep. They were surrounded and reportedly over 100 of them were shot.

A second massacre was reported to have been carried out at Sneaker's Creek (now called Sneaker's Gully) near the base of Mt Larcombe. In 1893 the Morning Bulletin recalled the massacre by NMP troops. "The position seems strong enough to enable the party in possession to hold it easily against an advancing foe, but spears and boomerangs after all could do little against the carbines of the relentless trackers, and bleached skulls and bones still bear evidence that the story is more than legendary."

Subsequent to the Nankin Creek, Wilmot Lagoon and Sneaker's Creek massacres, on the night of 22 January, the full moon, an incident (latterly describe as an attack by Aboriginal people but more accurately described as a clash) occurred on Archer's Gracemere property. It is sometimes wrongly reported to have occurred at William Elliott's Canoona run north of Yaamba but at the time Elliott and his men were still at Gracemere.

Elliott and his men, about 20, were camped at Nine Mile, most likely at what is now called the Lower Gracemere Lagoon. At about 11 pm a group of Aboriginal men, women and children arrived at the waterhole. ( If it was a premeditated attack, as European history records, it is unlikely they would have brought women and children along.)

Given that the Mt Larcombe massacre had occurred just four weeks previously, that Murray and his death squad had been roaming the countryside massacreing Aboriginal people en masse, it was night and most of Elliot's men were asleep, it's a recipe for chaos.

The Aboriginal people were immediately in Elliott's camp. There was much yelling. Shots were fired randomly by Elliott's men, spears were thrust through the sides of the men's gunyahs, Elliott emerged from his grass hut to see his men's gunyahs surrounded whereupon he strode towards the throng firing six shots from his pistol indiscriminately. Elliot was speared three times, a shepherd named Belfield was fatally speared and two others wounded. The Aboriginal band fled while shots were fired after them.

The Aboriginal band fled north crossing the Fitzroy at a place called Eight Mile Island. Three days later Archer and Murray returned to Gracemere and tracked the Aboriginal group across the Fitzroy to the north bank, where they found seven bodies on funeral biers. "They tracked the natives about the country, through which the Yaamba and Yeppoon Roads now run, and punished them for their attack (sic)."

In 1885, The Capricornian reported, in a less than somber tone that, '... On the day after the moonlight assault a somewhat amusing affair occurred. About twenty of the Gracemere blacks, who were friendly, and were allowed in and about the station, had been out hunting about the Lion Mountain and in coming back went near Elliott's camp. When the men saw them, they cried, "Here's the blacks back again!' and began firing at them. They fled towards Gracemere in terror. One of them was shot dead."

Elliott and the Archers appealed for greater assistance from the Native Police. Almost a year later, at a NSW Legislative Assembly inquiry in December 1856, Elliott blamed the lack of NMP troops for the attack but also admitted that he had lost no stock to Aboriginal attacks.

In February, Murray again conducted bloody massacres north of the Fitzroy River. Both Governor William Denison and the Inspector General of Police in Sydney approved of Murray's "severe and trying" campaigns of early 1856 recommending additional wages. Constable Hourigan was to be rewarded £5 for his contribution.

Problems with funding of the force, however, continued for the remainder of 1856 and into 1857. Desertions of troopers were common to the point where Murray was ordered to leave Gladstone and recruit more troopers from the Burnett region. When three whites were killed by Aboriginal warriors at Miriam Vale just south of Gladstone, Murray did not have the manpower to conduct extrajudicial punishment in the area. It was left to local squatters such as James Landsborough and a Native Police officer, Robert Walker, to carry out punitive measures which were also limited by geography and numerical weakness.

== Retribution after the Hornet Bank Massacre ==
Meanwhile, in the Dawson River region to the south-west of Gladstone, warfare between encroaching settlers and local Aboriginals was reaching a heightened level. Aggressive land taking activities had led to a number of shepherds being killed in several incidents. In 1856 pudding laced with strychnine had been given to clan groups in the area. Squatters on the Upper Dawson had carried out killings of local Aboriginal people in response to the spearing of cattle, including the massacre of twelve innocent 'station blacks'. An overseer on Hornet Bank had killed a Jiman man after falsely claiming he had stolen some rations. The stationing of NMP troops on Eurombar and Hornet Bank had resulted in both the troopers mixing with local Aboriginal people (hunting together and raiding squatter's huts) in violation of standing orders, and heightened tensions caused by the taking of Jiman women. This added to the indiscriminate massacres of native people by armed groups of squatters acting in conjunction with the locally stationed Native Police.

Adding to the tensions was the well known propensity of the Fraser boys and other Europeans for raping Jiman women. Sub Lieutenant Nicholl stated that Martha Fraser had 'repeatedly told him to reprove her sons for "forcibly taking the young maidens" and that, in consequence, she "expected harm would come of it." Many contemporary informants agreed that this was the cause of what followed. In October 1857, the violence escalated with the killing of twelve colonists and farmhands by Aboriginals at Hornet Bank. This became known as the Hornet Bank massacre and resulted in a long and bloody campaign against local Aboriginal Australians conducted by various armed groups of European squatters, Native Police and regular citizens.

George Serocold of Cockatoo Station related how his death squad, which came to be known as the Browns, killed all adult Aboriginal people they could find for 160 kilometers in every direction. "Severity was in reality mercy in the end. Accordingly twelve of us turned out, & taking rations with us we patrolled the country for 100 miles round for three weeks and spared none of the grown up blacks which we could find." A year later Serocold wrote "The blacks have been put down; they are still kept out from all the stations and bodies of mounted black Police under white officers patrol the country – no doubt a considerable number have been shot."

George Dunmore Lang wrote, "I learned from various sources that a party of twelve squatters and their confidential overseers went out mounted and armed to the teeth and scoured the Country for blacks, away from the scenes of the murder of the Frazers altogether, and shot upwards of eighty men women & children. Not content with scouring the scrubs & forest country they were bold enough to ride up to the Head stations and shoot down the tame blacks whom they found camping there. Ten men were shot in this way at Ross's head station on the Upper Burnett. Several at Prior's Station and at Hays & Lambs several more."

The surviving Fraser men, William and Sylvester (West) also carried out mass reprisals. In 1860 William claimed to have personally killed 70 Aboriginal people. It was believed at the time that William Fraser had murdered an Aboriginal woman in the street of Ipswich because she was wearing a dress that had belonged to his mother, that he had murdered Aboriginal men outside the Rockhampton courthouse after they were found not guilty of involvement in the massacre of his family and had shot dead an Aboriginal jockey at the Taroom racecourse and that he had cold bloodedly murdered a group of women and children.

At Juandah a group of Aboriginal men found to be not guilty of involvement in the massacre were murdered on the verandah of the courthouse and in the kitchen, despite the remonstrations of the local magistrate.

During this period the new Commandant of the Native Police, Edric Norfolk Vaux Morisset, deployed NMP troops from various areas to conduct patrols of summary punishments against Aboriginals in the Dawson River region. Murray and his troopers were sent from Gladstone to participate in these patrols. In January 1858, Murray wrote in a report that "a considerable number of Blacks..have been killed..and when entrapped within reach of gunshot, they were in cold blood destroyed." Murray and his troopers were in the region for months after the events of Hornet Bank, his energy in carrying out extrajudicial killings as punishment for the continued acts of resistance by Aboriginals being noted by government officials, squatters and the contemporary press.

By the time Murray and his fellow NMP officers and the Browns and the Frasers were finished with their genocide, the Jiman people had been almost completely exterminated. Remnants that fled as far afield as Rockhampton or South Australia survived and in 1998 descendants of the Jiman were recognised as Native Title owners.

In May 1858, Murray returned to Gladstone and found time to marry Rachel Little, daughter of the well known pastoralist John Little from the Rosedale station on the Burnett River.

== Commanding Officer of the Northern Districts ==
In the aftermath of Hornet Bank, New South Wales Government officials were keen to re-organise and strengthen the Native Police as an instrument of violent repression of Aboriginal people on the northern frontier of colonial settlement in Australia. While denying that the actions of the Native Police were an "attempt to wage a war of extermination against the Aborigines", the 1858 government report into the force concluded that "there is no alternative but to carry matters through with a strong hand and punish with necessary severity all future outrages".

As a result of this reorganisation, Lieutenant Murray became the Commanding officer of the Northern Districts, which included the areas around Gladstone, the Dawson River, and the newly colonised region around Rockhampton. Under his control were 5 sections of Native Police made up of 5 2nd-Lieutenants, 4 sergeants and around 43 troopers. One of these 2nd-Lieutenants was George Poultney Malcolm Murray, who was the Lieutenant's younger brother, having joined the force in late 1857.

Another officer under his command was the notorious Frederick Wheeler, who in a report to John Murray in 1858 wrote that Aboriginals "must all suffer, for the innocent must be held responsible for the guilt of others." Murray did not rebuke Wheeler for his comments, on the contrary, October 1958 found Murray back on the Calliope River where he joined forces with Wheeler to conduct another massacre which resulted in the deaths of at least 5 native people. In a report to his NMP Commandant of 3 November 1858 he wrote "I came upon a large camp of Blacks at the edge of a scrub. Five of the murderers (sic) were shot by Police. No doubt more of them would have fallen had not the information of an approach been given by their gins, who saw us in open country." Murray ordered Wheeler to conduct further missions in the area against the survivors of this raid and was full of praise for Wheeler and his troopers during their "very arduous piece of duty."

== Rockhampton Barracks ==
In 1858 Murray was sent to establish a large barracks in Rockhampton with the view to this being the headquarters of the Native Police in the near future. He chose a well-watered, elevated place on the Athelstane Range just to west of Rockhampton. The barracks and police paddocks were situated on Murray's Lagoon (named after John Murray) and are now occupied mostly by the Rockhampton Botanic Gardens near Rockhampton Airport. Murray, being the commanding officer in the region, was often based at these barracks with his wife. In 1859, she gave birth to his first son, John James Athelstane Murray, who, in an apparent tradition with the offspring of Native Police officers, shared a middle name with the barracks in which he was born.

== The Fanny Briggs murder ==
In December 1859, Queensland officially separated from New South Wales to become a new British colony. The first Governor of Queensland, George Bowen, conducted a customary tour of the fledgling colony and visited Rockhampton with his entourage in late 1860. Lieutenant Murray, similar to his reception of NSW Governor Fitzroy some years prior at Gladstone, paraded his troops to the satisfaction of the Queen's representative. Unfortunately for Murray, this high-profile visit coincided with an equally high-profile rape and murder of a young woman in the region named Fanny Briggs.

On 6 November 1860, Mr. John Watts reported to Murray that Briggs had gone missing. Murray, with the help of Watts, Mr. Genatas and an Aboriginal trooper named Toby started the search for the woman. On 8 and 9 November, with the help of more troopers the search was resumed but without success. On the 10th, Murray came across some tracks and a saddle cloth. It wasn't until 12 November that the body of the woman was discovered. On the 13th, the search party followed tracks of a large number of Aboriginal people suspected of the murder. Near Raglan Creek they came across an Aboriginal man named Mico who had allegedly murdered a German hutkeeper. One of the Aboriginal troopers shot him and another Aboriginal man.

Kennis, a former Native Mounted Police trooper, told the police that Gulliver, a Native Police trooper, confessed to him that he, and two other troopers Toby and Alma, had violated Briggs, and subsequently killed her to prevent her cries. Toby and Alma were promptly arrested. Governor Bowen and the Executive Council then ordered the murder of the troopers involved rather than allow them a criminal trial. Gulliver was later shot dead by Lieutenant Walter Powell during an 'escape attempt'. Toby "disappeared" after being escorted into the bush by some troopers and was later reported murdered by Lieutenant Rudolph Morisset in 1861, while Alma was shot dead at a riverbank by his captor while "trying to escape" despite being in leg-irons and handcuffs.

Despite knowing that three members of the NMP had committed the rape and murder of Fanny Briggs, Governor Bowen, Commander Morisset and Murray continued to allow people to believe that local Aboriginal people were responsible. The result was akin to a war of extermination against local tribes. Denis Cryle wrote that "Aggravated by Hornet Bank, racial tensions at Rockhampton (pop. 700-800 in 1860) were comparable with the troubled contemporary situation at Maryborough. In the absence of an impartial magistracy or any local journal, Native Police and squatters carried out a bloody campaign of extermination in and around the town." He quotes a contemporary source, an acquaintance of Murray who wrote "The troopers undoubtedly took a fiendish delight in shooting the hapless Aborigines ... From one point of view, it is horrible to think of the helpless blacks flying from the ruthless avenger, who indiscriminately killed young and old and, at times, women and children though this is often denied."

== Transfer to Maryborough, massacres and enforced resignation ==
Not long after the Fanny Briggs affair, Murray was transferred out of Rockhampton by Commandant Morisset, and Lieutenant John O'Connell Bligh was preferred to Murray to conduct operations out of the Northern Districts. Bligh had recently received a lot of attention after he shot a number of Aboriginals along the river within the town of Maryborough and the relocation was a convenient diversion to this scrutiny. Murray, in turn, was transferred to the Coopers Plains barracks near Maryborough to take over Bligh's previous duties. The relocation was not favourable to Murray as, in just a few months after moving to Maryborough, Murray became involved in two other publicised scandals.

In response to reports that Aboriginals were killing cattle at Conondale and Widgee, Murray sent out a young officer with some troopers to conduct a punitive mission against these Aboriginals. This officer was Rudolph Morisset, the younger brother of the Commandant. Ruldolph together with Mr William Cashbrook Giles, the overseer at Widgee pastoral station, led the troopers to the area and conducted three raids which resulted in the deaths of at least 8 Aboriginals near Manumbar. Some of those killed were in the employ of a local squatter and letters were written to newspapers outlining displeasure at the nature of the killings. Subsequent to these and other killings conducted by the Native Police around this time, a Queensland parliamentary inquiry was conducted into the activities of the force. The operation of the Native Police was largely vindicated by this inquiry, but John Murray was identified as being responsible for the killings at Manumbar. The logic was that Murray should not have sent a junior officer on this mission, but the fact that this officer was the brother of the Commandant is more than likely the reason that Murray was attributed the blame. Further reports made to the inquiry which were supported by evidence in newspaper articles also accused Murray of conducting a large massacre of 30-40 Aboriginals at Imbil in March 1861.

The article published in the Maryborough Chronicle, Wide Bay and Burnett Advertiser was scathing of Murray, contrasting his actions unfavourably with those of John O'Connell Bligh, the previous NMP officer in the area who had famously marched down the main street of Maryborough, randomly executing Aboriginal people, then commandeered a boat to pursue and shoot them in the Mary River. (The townsfolk had awarded him an engraved cavalry sword for his efforts.)

Those same townsfolk had, according to the paper, lately become "indignant at the conduct...( of Murray) who, together with his troopers, has lately made an onslaught on the aborigines, and is said to have massacred the inmates of a camp indiscriminately...we know positively that a slaughter has taken place...and if half the horrors described as attendant upon it have any foundation in fact, civilisation has been again disgraced by a cowardly and cold-blooded deed. It is reported that some thirty to thirty-five blacks- including men, women and children- had been butchered- there is no other term for it- by a detachment of native police; and it is further stated that the detachment was under the command of Lieut. Murray..."

Importantly, the paper's objections to Murray's atrocity was not based on regard for the enduring welfare of Aboriginal people, who they saw as inevitably destined for extinction, but on the depraved manner that Murray carried out his task. They wrote "Rather than give it (the NMP) a perpetuity of existence, our legislators had far better accord to the pioneer squatters the privilege of self defence, for we believe the interests of humanity- and Christianity too- would be more effectively furthered by this means than the present detestable method of hiring treacherous savages to slay those of their own race and colour. The most sincere philanthropist must foresee that extermination- the inevitable fate of all such irreconcilable races- awaits the Australian aborigine, but it is culpable in us to further and countenance by governmental authority the speedier consummation of this terrible doom."

Murray was further discredited by complaints of chronic inebriation during his career with the force, and as a result of these disgraces one of the recommendations of the inquiry was that Murray should be removed from the force due to a "general unfitness for his duties". Despite writing public protestations against these negative findings, Murray resigned from the Native Police in 1862.

== Returns to the Native Police as recruiting officer ==
In 1864, Murray was re-employed by the Queensland Government to be a recruiting officer for the Native Police. The force at this time was again re-organised with the position of Commandant being abolished and the operations now being under the direction of the Queensland Police Commissioner in David Thompson Seymour. Seymour wanted to strengthen the Native Police considerably in order to assist European colonisation through the vast extent of Queensland. Seymour sent Murray to the Riverina District of southern New South Wales to recruit troopers from the remaining Aboriginal population there. This area was the source of the original troopers of the Native Police recruited by Frederick Walker in 1848. Murray arrived at Echuca, bringing with him the four surviving members of Walker's original force, who up to that time had been in continuous service for 16 years. One of the troopers was able to be re-united with his father. From Echuca, Murray went to Deniliquin and then to Melbourne where he and his new recruits were shipped to Brisbane to be trained as paramilitary fighters. Murray was able to recruit 20 new troopers on this trip. The following year, Murray again returned to the Riverina to recruit, this time bringing back to Queensland 22 new Aboriginal recruits to be trained "to fire with precision on their fellow countrymen".

== Cardwell ==
In middle part of 1865, John Murray was appointed to be an Inspector of Native Police based at Cardwell in far north Queensland. As part of the restructure of the force, the rank of Lieutenant was replaced with the title of Inspector. Initially, Murray was based at Meunga Creek near Cardwell replacing sub-Inspector Reginald Uhr who relocated to the Valley of Lagoons. Murray subsequently relocated his base to Attie Creek. Soon after his deployment, John Murray accompanied the government surveyor Walter Hill in exploring the capacity of the area for agricultural development by British squatters. They journeyed around the Mackay River (now named the Tully River) and the Macalister River (now named the Murray River (Queensland) after John Murray). They found an area of open plains amongst the rainforest, later named the Bellenden Plains, which was cultivated for sugar cane growing by John Ewen Davidson and Charles Eden.

Davidson's journal and Charles Eden's biography flesh out the intimate and entwined relationships between colonial invaders, government administration and the workings of the Native Mounted Police, at the ragged edges of British Empire. Davidson's relations with the local Girramay owners was extremely violent from the get go. His explorations searching for a site for a plantation were carried out in the company of a NMP troop under Reginald Uhr.

Davidson diary recorded that on 18 September 1865 he had randomly fired at Girramay at the mouth of Sandy Creek and looted their property. The following day, Davidson perpetrated a second violent attack at the same spot. On 30 December 1865 Davidson recorded shooting at a 'black' on the north spit of the Murray River.

On 7 January 1866 Davidson wrote that on their way back to Cardwell after having scouting locations for Davidson's future plantation, Uhr and his troopers had massacred a group of Girramay whose only offence was to be visible: "Rode back by the road party's track, near where they were attacked by the blacks- some were seen, pursued and shot down; it was a strange and painful sight to see a human being running for his life and see the black police galloping after him and hear the crack of the carbines; the gins and children all hid in the grass: nothing is ever done to them, though we examined the contents of their dilly bags. One little girl took refuge under my horse's belly and would not move: of course, I took no part in these proceedings, that being the duty of the police: it is the only way of insuring the lives of white men to show that they cannot be attacked with impunity, for though the road party drove them off, if a dog had not given the alarm they would most probably have all been murdered as they slept. At 1 p.m. stopped in the middle of a stream; discovered another wild black's camp, and secured [stole] their dinner- fish, prawns and scrub hen's eggs, all cooked to a nicety."

On 26 February 1866 Davidson recorded purchasing cutlasses and gunpowder from the government Commissariat, in preparation for his occupying Girramay land.

On 27 March Davidson, his partner Thomas, Dallachy the government botanist, (whose family became notorious mass poisoners of Aboriginal men, women and children. Bottoms. 141-2) three boatman; Saxy, Atkinson and Fitzgerald, Leefe the Police Magistrate, sub Inspector Reginald Uhr and seven NMP killers began what can only be described as a military campaign to occupy Girramay land.

The next day Davidson recorded that "...the troopers came across some myall blacks..." and that subsequently the troopers had "fired at a myall who was coming too close to camp. On the 29th Davidson recorded NMP troopers hunting the Girramay. On 30 March 1866 Davidson reported that "The trooper had pursued some myalls and brought back no end of dillybags, fish baskets, spears, etc." By 7 May 1866 Davidson and his men are feeling isolated and alone. Paranoia begins to set in. "Was roused in the night by a false alarm of blacks." On 9 May 1866 "No night yet without an alarm of blacks though none of us have seen any yet." Davidson's men began to succumb to fever.

On 23 May 1866 Davidson met John Murray. On 24 June 1866 Davidson wrote of Girramay men with wooden swords and shields confronting his camp. Davidson responded with a .54 calibre Terry carbine. The Girramay had "made their appearance yelling and screaming in a large mob of about 40: halted at the garden fence about 50 yards from the humpy, where, as I saw another mob coming up behind, we gave them a volley when they turned tail and retreated, but did not run, or throw away their swords and shields. We followed them up into the scrub, firing at them as we went. Some were wounded, but I saw none killed: there was plenty of blood on one or two shields which we picked up."

25 June 1866. "Niggers about at night-feared meant no sleep in our hut." (From this point Davidson's language changes. Whereas prior to meeting Murray, Davidson referred to the Girramay as 'blacks' or 'myalls', after Murray's arrival at Cardwell, Davidson begins to refer to the Girramay as 'niggers'. From this point on 'nigger' is the only word that Davidson uses.)

By the end of June 1866, after just three months on site, Davidson and his men were becoming physically ill and mentally deranged from the constant fear, paranoia, lack of sleep and debilitating illness, as every night they imagined the Girramay were lurking in the darkness. Daylight always revealed no trace of the Girramay having been there during the night. 30 June 1866. "Thomas in a very depressed state since the niggers attacked the camp: his nerves having been severely shaken and he himself thoroughly unhinged."

On 4 July 1866 John Murray arrived at the plantation. "Black troopers came up with Mr. Murray and [police magistrate] I. B. Leefe, just after breakfast. After dinner, showed them where we were attacked...Troopers came back in the evening having seen no niggers..." Murray and the troopers left on the 6th.

22 July 1866. "Saw the blacks coming again and got ready for them. They would not come so near as before but stayed about 300 yards off. I and three men went round by the yard and got behind a lot of them- whom we pitched into freely. We had at least a dozen swords and shields for firewood. Davidsons plantation was attacked twice by Aboriginal people, but by the time Murray and his troopers arrived, they did not find any. Murray promised to return in a week or ten days to "clear out the neighbourhood."

A week later Leefe, Murray and his NMP troopers returned. 30 July 1866. "Heard shots from Murray's party." The next day Davidson records that Murray has massacred 60 men. "Murray, Leefe and three boys came up and we all went across the Mackay, (now Tully River) up to our waists in water, but failed in finding the niggers. They had dispersed two mobs of about 60 fighting men near the coast and the boys report some yellow gins, which look as if there were some shipwrecked sailors or, had been, among them. Murray and party returned to the boat but after visiting the Valley, he promised to come up here for a week or ten days and clear out the neighbourhood."

At this point, 1 August 1866, Davidson's circumstances are desperate. "Last night I suffered greatly from depression of spirits, caused partly by Thomas wanting to leave me...partly by his overhearing my men declare that they would leave unless they were in a strong party to repel the niggers."

On 6 August 1866, "Saw some fresh nigger tracks, so in the afternoon Thomas and Clarke, Burnell and Davy, tried to find them but failed..." On 7 August 1866 Davidson's partner Thomas, now mentally unhinged and debilitated by constant fear, abandoned the partnership and returned to England.

On 1 November 1866 "Mr. Murray and three troopers came up..." On 2 November Davidson "Went across the river at the falls with the police and found a camp of gins but no niggers. Police went up the river in the afternoon but saw nothing." 3 November 1866. "Rode up to the nearest point of the range where there was a large fire and some niggers were caught." Davidson does not say what happened to these people but there is no record of them being arrested or taken to the lock up in Cardwell, which had not seen a prisoner in years and was derelict, according to his future partner Charles Eden. 4 November 1866. "Showed the troopers the track to the top of the plain [probably Jumbun] where there was a camp but the beggars had seen us coming and bolted and though we followed them for four miles through the scrub, they had got too much start."

On the 19th Davidson recorded having gone to John Murray's police camp. "A row among the troopers, they having been surreptitiously supplied with grog by "Jummy", the black boy at the Herbert, whom we caught and Mr. Murray handcuffed him by his feet round a tree for the night."

30 November 1866. Davidson's workers, Taylor, McGrath and Davy all quit because of fear of the Girramay, somewhat ironic given that no whiter man had been killed but untold numbers of Girramay men, women and children had already been slaughtered.

On Christmas Eve 1866 a cyclone destroyed Davidson's plantation. Davidson spent the night up a gum tree. He subsequently abandoned the plantation, later selling a partnership to Charles Eden. While Eden's biography falsely claimed that he had arrived in Cardwell to be a sugar planter, in truth he was also a Police Magistrate and a sub-Collector of Customs. It seems that he did not include these facts in his biography because he was subsequently dismissed for reason unknown.

As an officer of the law, Eden was an integral part, along with the NMP, of colonial administration. Eden was also the brother in law of two NMP officers, William Richard Onslow Hill and Cecil Hill. Cecil Hill, a newly minted acting sub-Inspector, had been transferred to his first post on the Mackenzie River under the command of George Price, who had immediately abandoned his post leaving the untrained Hill in charge. Having attacked a local aboriginal clan, Hill then camped near the scrub and had been surprised and fatally speared at night.

By the time Eden arrived at Cardwell, John Murray was in command of multiple troops under Walter Powell, Charles Blakeney, Thomas Coward, Henry Zouch Finch, John McIlwraith and David Walsh. With such an array of NMP death squads scouring the countryside, Eden's book recounts multiple personal acts of violence against the Girramay, demonstrating the normalisation of violence on the frontier. Eden's occupation of Bellenden coincided with the introduction of 'Kanaka' slave labour and Eden secured twenty such slaves for his plantation. They were to become an extremely violent force against the local clans.

Eden immediately ordered his slaves that, whenever they saw Aboriginal people, they were to "charge their foes with their hoes or anything that came to hand." Taking him at his word, Magistrate Eden's Kanaka slaves had attacked the local Girringun clans and "that every Sunday for months had been spent hunting 'man of bush' [and they had] ... fallen in with and vanquished the blacks on several occasions." And that "On several occasions they had met with and slaughtered the blacks." (Eden 334)He describes one incident where his slaves had encountered ten Aboriginal men "near a small waterhole in the centre of the scrub on the Mackay [Tully] River..."All were murdered."

He writes of Sale, his headman, having led his Tanna men, to attack the Girramay, "whom they had altogether destroyed." He believed that the Tanna men were kidnapping and eating Aboriginal children.

Magistrate Eden also relates another event, his violent assault on Girringun women and children and the kidnapping of a ten to twelve year old Girramay boy. He writes that he had come across a group of thirty to forty women and children in a clearing near the Tully River. They were terrified and threw themselves on the children to protect them. Two or three old women began berating them and one threw a stick and hit Eden's black boy, Jimmy, who went to shoot her. Eden stopped him, then, randomly, hit upon the idea of kidnapping a Girringun child. The women resisted throwing themselves upon the children to protect them. Eden wrote that "...we feared we should not get him without violence." Jimmy then threw a burning log on top of the pile of bodies so that Eden could seize the boy. The child escaped two weeks later.

Murray's position at Cardwell and the strength of the forces under his command allowed Murray to concentrate on pursuits other than waging of war against subjects of the Crown. In a CSIRO paper on the origins of Australian scientific endeavour, Dowe and Maroske debunk the spurious claims that Boron von Mueller's botanist, John Dallachy, ventured into the rainforest alone, providing evidence of his close association with the NMP paramilitary squads: "The evidence we have found, however, suggests that Dallachy rarely, if ever, travelled alone away from the immediate environs of Cardwell...and was often accompanied by members of the Native Police."

"Thus, Dallachy was not always the actual collector of a specimen. On several occasions he noted that specimens were brought to him: for example, for Acronychia acronychioides, labelled as 8 May 1866 from Burdekin River, he recorded that ‘Murray brought this from near the Burdekin River’, this being Inspector John Murray of the native police who was stationed in Cardwell 1865–70...". 18 September 1866. Dysoxylum mollissimum. "Mr Murray sent a black trooper Willy who went up the tree and cut off a branch." 7 April 1868: Dallach records Syzigium cryptophlebian. "The tree is about 50 feet high one of the troopers went up and cut some branches off." 10 April 1869: Carnarvonia araliifolia. "...trooper cut off flower..."

Dowe and Maroske write of the close association between various extremely violent individuals and Dallachy's research: "Of these, ten taxa were named for twelve Europeans directly associated with Rockingham Bay and Cardwell, mostly including residents and officers. It is possible that no other settler community in Australia had so many relatively ordinary but ruthless [read genocidal] individuals commemorated in plant names. "John Murray is memorialised in Cryptocarya murrayi, Murray's laurel.

When reports of a white man living on Hinchinbrook Island were circulated, Murray was part of an expedition party searching every Aboriginal camp not only on Hinchinbrook, but on most other islands in the region. A dray carrying a load of wool from the Valley of Lagoons pastoral property to be shipped from Cardwell was robbed by Aboriginal people, Murray was sent "to punish them according to their deserts".

On 9 January 1867, Murrays wife gave birth to a daughter. In 1870, Murray conducted a tour of inspection of various police camps, returning with a number of specimens of gold in quartz.

== Drunkenness and resignation ==
By 1870, reports of John Murray being continually drunk on duty and quarrelling with fellow police magistrates were raised in the press. An inquiry into Murray's behaviour was conducted in October and at the conclusion of it, Murray resigned from the police force. Murray remained at Kirtleton becoming a cattle auctioneer and providing female Aboriginals for missionaries to act as interpreters.

== Death and legacy ==
John Murray died in 1876 from diphtheria, leaving a widow and several children. His obituary stated that he "rendered immense service to pioneer squatters in protecting them from the raids of niggers". Three of John Murray's brothers, Frederick Murray, George Poultney Malcolm Murray and Robert Murray also served in the Native Police, although some sources state otherwise. Another brother, James Murray was a pastoral squatter in the Baffle Creek area of Queensland.

Murray's tombstone, unloved and uncared for, is located at Meunga Creek, squashed up against a chain link fence at the back of a dustbowl Caravan Park on the side of the Bruce Highway in Ellerbeck near Cardwell. While his grave is heritage-listed, not a single one of the many sites of massacres that he perpetrated is similarly respected. His headstone reads "Sacred to the memory of John Murray. Who died 30th July 1876. Aged 49 years." The heritage places report states that it is "important for recognising and commemorating the contributions of Inspector John Murray in maintaining law and order".

The exact numbers of Aboriginal people that Murray slaughtered throughout his 20 year involvement with death squads can never be known. In the immediately aftermath of the massacre of five white workers at Mt Larcombe Murray killed 200 at Raglan and Keppel Bay, 14 at Nankin Creek, reportedly may have perpetrated two other massacres at Wilmott Lagoon and Sneaker's Creek and carried out further punitive raids north of the Fitzroy. All this within the space of two months.

The Murray River and Murray Falls in Queensland are named after John Murray, as is Murray Lagoon near Rockhampton.
