= John Davidson (British writer) =

British writer

John Davidson (born 1944) is an English writer on mysticism and Christian origins.
