= Fugleman =

Fugleman (from the German Flügelmann, the man on the Flügel or wing; wingman), properly a military term for a soldier who is selected to act as guide, and posted generally on the flanks with the duty of directing the march in the required line, or of giving the time, etc., to the remainder of the unit, which conforms to his movements, in any military exercise. The word is then applied to a ringleader or one who takes the lead in any movement or concerted movement.

These days it is used for a person who is a staunch advocate, a cheerleader, a publicist, or a mouthpiece.

Fugalman is an alternative, archaic and potentially regional spelling variant used in Australia in the early 19th century.
