= John Ewen Davidson =

(1841–1923) sugar-planter and slave holder in Australia

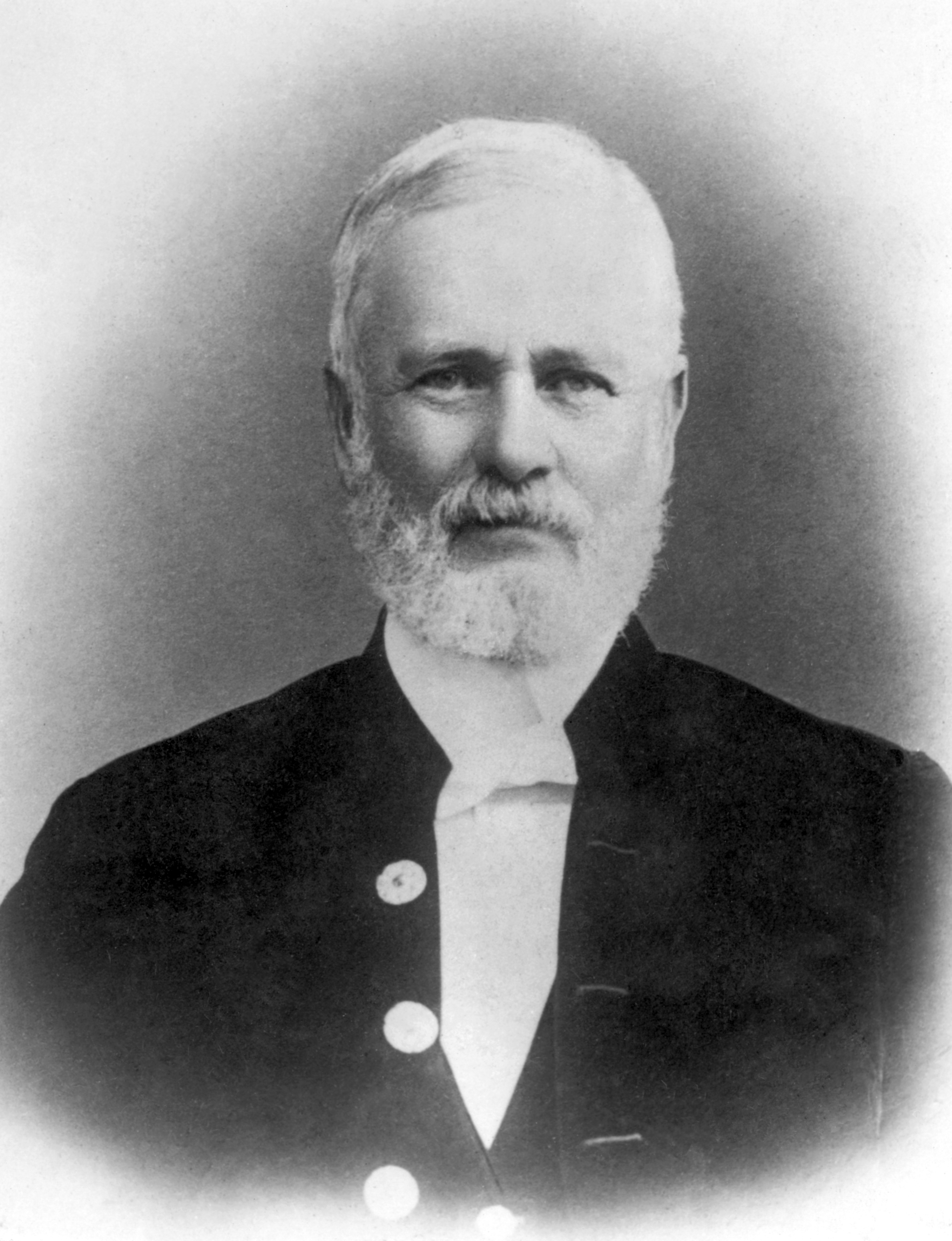
- John Ewen Davidson
- Born: 2 March 1841; London, England
- Died: 2 September 1923 (aged 82); Oxford, England
- Education: University of Oxford
- Spouse: Amy Ashdown (m. 1875)
- Children: 6

John Ewen Davidson (2 March 1841 in London – 2 September 1923 in Oxford) was a colonist sugar planter, slave owner, murderer, and miller in Queensland.

== Life and career ==
John Ewen Davidson was born as the son of a Scottish merchant. He was educated Harrow School and Oxford, where he graduated with a Bachelor of Arts in 1862. He was also a member of the Marylebone Cricket Club in London and played one first class cricket match in 1864. After a trip to the West Indies and British Guiana he came to Australia in 1865. There he met pioneer Queensland sugar planter Captain Claudius Whish and visited his farm at Caboolture, where he was shown how to grow sugar in the climatic conditions of Queensland.

== Bellenden Plains ==
A year later, he began as a sugar planter at Bellenden Plains on the Murray River north of Cardwell in Far North Queensland. According to his own diary entries, Davidson was involved in frequent mass shootings of Aboriginal people in this area as he tried to establish his sugar plantation. In January 1866, he accompanied sub-Inspector Reginald Uhr and his troopers of the Native Police who pursued and shot down "some blacks". In March, Davidson again participated in a raid on the local people by the Native Police and "no end of bags, fish baskets, spears were brought back" as plunder. Davidson was additionally aided by Inspector John Murray of the Native Police, who would arrive "to clear out the blacks". Davidson instructed his kanaka (slaves) to take guns into the canefields at Bellenden and to shoot any trespassers.

After his plantation at Bellenden Plains was destroyed by a flood in late 1866, Davidson sold out of the area. Before his departure from the area, Davidson participated in a large punitive expedition against the indigenous people of Goold Island located just north of Hinchinbrook Island. After "dispersing" the "Goold Island niggers", this group "sailed back to Cardwell with a string of canoes".

== Mackay ==
Thus, he relocated to Mackay in 1867 and set-up the cotton and sugar plantation Alexandra together with Thomas Henry Fitzgerald. He investigated new varieties of sugar cane and methods of production and visited many other areas in the world over his career. As Davidson participated in violent raids on a number of Aboriginal camps, he was able to collect Aboriginal artefacts for the British Museum. In most cases, however, Davidson and others would burn the weapons and instruments that were left behind after these attacks. He recorded a species of plum tree and was the first Briton to identify a comet in Queensland with his own telescope. He also donated aboriginal artefacts to the Dresden Museum of Ethnology in 1881: A shield (No 33073) found at the Mulgrave River shows an inscription on the handle ‘Australia from Baessler’, which is an indication that Davidson had teamed-up with the German anthropologist and photographer Arthur Baessler (1857–1907) when he travelled in Australia in 1891–1893.

From approximately 1881, he part-owned W. Sloane & Co. in Melbourne, which invested heavily in the Mackay sugar industry. It changed its name to Melbourne Mackay Sugar Company in 1882. Subsequently, Davidson managed six mills and estates using the most modern and expensive equipment. In 1884, Davidson travelled to England to try to persuade the Colonial Office to allow importations of Indian labourers, after the kanaka trade had ceased. After the crisis of the Queensland sugar industry in 1888, Davidson testified to the Royal Commission into the industry that four of the six of his company's estates were idle. He sought protection to protect the fledgling Queensland industry from European bounty-fed beet sugar. Due to the advent of the Federation and introduction of governmentally supported Central Mills, the cane industry declined and the business of the large sugar estates slowed-down significantly.

On 1 August 1875, Davidson married Amy Constance Ashdown, from Sydney. They had two sons and four daughters together.

Around 9:00 PM on 19 July 1889, he discovered a comet from his personal observatory. This comet is now known as C/1889 O1 (Davidson), and it was observed by astronomers until November 1889.

Around 1900, he returned with his family for his retirement to England, and died there at his Oxford home on 2 September 1923.
