= Robert Arthur Johnstone =

British colonial police officer

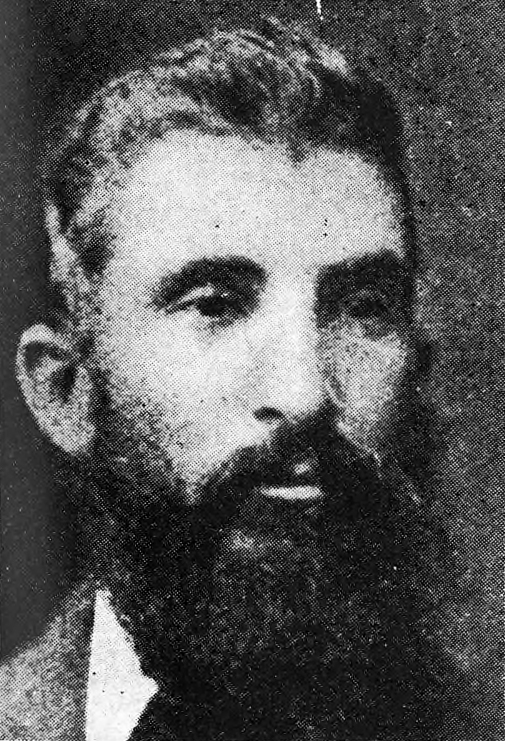
- Sub-Inspector Robert Johnstone
- Born: 1843; Richmond, Van Dieman's Land
- Died: 16 January 1905 (aged 61); Toowong, Queensland
- Occupations: Station manager, police officer, explorer, police magistrate
- Spouse: Maria Ann Gibson

Robert Arthur Johnstone (1843 – 16 January 1905) was an officer in the Native Police paramilitary force which operated in the British colony of Queensland. He was stationed at various locations in central and northern Queensland between 1867 and 1880 conducting regular punitive expeditions against clans of Indigenous Australians who resisted colonisation. He also participated in several surveying expeditions in Far North Queensland, including those under the leadership of George Elphinstone Dalrymple.

After resigning from the Native Police in 1880, he became a police magistrate in various locations around Queensland before retiring from government service in 1891. In his years of duty for the Native Police, Johnstone led many punitive expeditions and "dispersals" consistent with government policy, resulting in thousands of Aboriginal people being killed or displaced from their traditional lands.

A number of geographical and zoological entities are named after Johnstone, such as the Johnstone River and the freshwater crocodile.

== Early life and family history ==
Robert Arthur Johnstone was born in Richmond, Tasmania in 1843 to parents John Johnstone (alias Johnston Need) and Annie Elizabeth Easton. His paternal grandfather was Lieutenant-General Samuel Need. Lieutenant-General Need married an Indian woman, most likely the daughter of Saadat Ali Khan II, and had several children with her, one of whom was Robert Johnstone's father. After the death of his wife, Samuel Need returned with his children to Britain and remarried. Due to their Indian heritage, his sons were disinherited by Need. One of the sons, Johnston Need, changed his name to John Johnstone, married Annie Easton, and moved to Tasmania in 1835 where Robert was born. It is notable that a number of other Native Police officers, such as Lieutenant John Murray have similar family backgrounds involving Indian grandmothers.

In 1850, at the age of seven, Robert Arthur Johnstone was sent to England to be educated at Norwich Grammar School. His father, in the meantime, had remarried and changed residence across Bass Strait to Tower Hill near Warrnambool in the British colony of Victoria. After his schooling, Robert re-joined with his father and siblings at this location in around 1860. During this time Robert claimed that he came in frequent contact with the remnants of the local Aboriginal population (probably the Koroit gundidj clan of the Gunditjmara) and with those residing on the Wannon River. In 1865, at the age of 22, Robert decided to move to Queensland to pursue a career in pastoral land management along the colonial frontier.

== Property manager in Mackay region ==
After an apparently brief period of managing a pastoral property in the Apis Creek area northwest of Rockhampton, Johnstone became property manager of the Greenmount run 10 km west of Mackay in North Queensland. Here he became acquainted with the operations and personnel of the local detachment of Native Police based at Fort Cooper. This government funded paramilitary force had been in existence in various forms throughout Colonial Australia since 1837 and consisted of white officers in command of mounted and armed Aboriginal troopers. The duty of the Native Police was to conduct punitive raids on Aboriginal communities that interfered in colonial expansion. Johnstone became a cadet in this force and was appointed Acting sub-Inspector to the Native Police in 1867. In this year he also married Maria Ann Gibson at Lansdowne near Mackay. Gibson was the daughter of a Royal Navy captain.

== Native Police operations around Mackay ==
Johnstone was based at the Fort Cooper barracks, now known as Nebo, in the ranges to the west of Mackay. One of his first duties was patrolling the north side of the Pioneer River in April 1867, where he encountered several Aboriginal camps, one of which contained more than 200 people. These camps "were dealt with in the usual and only effectual mode for restraining their savage propensities", which meant indiscriminate shooting of the occupants by Johnstone and his troopers to clear them from the area. The brutal operations of the Native Police were well known throughout the colony and beyond, where troopers would usually "make a night attack on the slumbering tribe and generally slay a large number". A large group of Aboriginal men, women and children were pursued by a Native Police force led by Sub-Inspector Johnstone, in April 1867. The group was camping on Balnagowan pastoral lease where cattle had been speared in February 1867. They sought refuge in caves at the top of a mountain, but were forced to jump off a cliff on Mount Mandarana of several hundred feet, rather than be face the carbines of the Native Police Force. The area is still known as Black Gin's Leap. Later in the same year, after some Yuibera men had speared five head of cattle at Koumala, Johnstone chased members of the clan to some islands offshore and when they tried to return to the mainland "such a lesson was administered" to keep them from "committing outrages in that locality".

In 1868 a large group of Aboriginals killed 7 cattle at Greenmount with Johnstone and his troopers "administering a lesson to the blackskins...who richly merit a severe one". Also in 1868, Johnstone "meted out...the customary chastisement" to Aboriginals who were frightening shepherds and livestock at the Cardowan run on the Connors River. Johnstone himself describes in his memoirs other punitive expeditions he led while stationed at Nebo, including that of "punishing blacks" for the killing of a shepherd at May Downs. When he returned from this mission, he found a group of Aboriginals camped near his barracks. He chased them off and then later tracked them into the ranges where he shot a number of the "would-be murderers". He also reported how after punishing a group of Aboriginals at Collaroy station on the Connors River, his troopers, while returning to Nebo, were shot at by panic stricken workers at the Tierawoomba station. When taking cover from this unexpected attack, Johnstone found a large Aboriginal weapon-making site in a ravine between Tierawoomba and Blue Mountain.

In early 1869, a pastoral squatter by the name of James Collins was killed by Yuibera near Fort Cooper at North Creek. Johnstone and his troopers mustered two local family groups of Aboriginals living in the area and coerced confessions from a number of them by holding family members hostage and tying others to the stirrup irons of their horses and forcing them to run along with the horses. Retributions against those identified were conducted with local squatter Sylvester "West" Fraser from Grosvenor Downs. Fraser was a survivor of the 1857 Hornet Bank massacre and his brother was the notorious William Fraser who killed many Aboriginals both as a private citizen and as a Native Police officer in the years after the events at Hornet Bank. Although having armed settlers partake in the punitive expeditions of the Native Police was against official orders, Johnstone allowed West Fraser to participate on the "promise of secrecy and obedience". In fact, it was relatively common for armed civilians to ride with the Native Police on these missions either as volunteers or as special constables. Albert Wright of Avon Downs wrote in his diary that "about 60 blacks were shot at Grosvenor Downs" as part of the armed excursions following the killing of James Collins. These punitive operations have now become known as the Nebo killings of early 1869. In March of the same year, Johnstone was again out with his troops endeavouring to punish "the blacks" after the killing of a Chinese shepherd at Mt Heilcalong station near Lake Elphinstone.

== Property manager at Bellenden Plains ==
Johnstone resigned from the Native Police in 1869. While in the Mackay region, Johnstone had evidently become acquainted with John Ewen Davidson, a sugar planter who had formed plantations in several parts of Queensland. One of these was the Bellenden Plains property north of Cardwell. The Bellenden Plains was an open area of around 600 acres amongst the rainforest on the Murray River of Queensland downstream from the Murray Falls. John Ewen Davidson, however, still remained a co-owner of the property with fellow blackbirder and sugar planter John Raymond Trevelian. In 1869, they appointed Johnstone as property manager to continue the Bellenden Plains project.

Johnstone moved to Bellenden Plains with his wife and newborn child. He had numerous violent encounters with the local Dyirbal and Girramay people while re-establishing the property. He went on several punitive missions with his "own black-boy" and also with the local Native Police led by John Murray. The Kanakas who worked on the cane farm also participated in violent raids against the Aboriginals as part of their duties. Johnstone describes one incident early in his stay where "the blacks" used their wooden shields as a movable barricade and the cover of smoke from deliberately lit fires in a counter-attack on the property's homestead. Johnstone shot at them continuously from the verandah with multiple firearms pre-loaded by his wife. He "followed up" the Aboriginals as far as Tam O'Shanter Point with John Murray to punish them. After this experience, he sent his family to reside in Cardwell, while he stayed on at Bellenden Plains with the farmworkers. Johnstone "had a lively time of it" on the property until it was sold in 1871 to F.J.W. Beardmore.

== Reappointed to the Native Police ==
Johnstone was reappointed to Acting sub-Inspector in the Native Police in 1871. He was posted at various locations throughout coastal Far North Queensland until his resignation from the force in 1881. Some of the barracks in which he was stationed include Cardwell, Valley of Lagoons Station, Herbert Vale and Fort Herbert near Ingham. During this decade of service, Johnstone was involved in numerous patrols, expeditions and massacres. Descriptions of the most notable are outlined chronologically below.

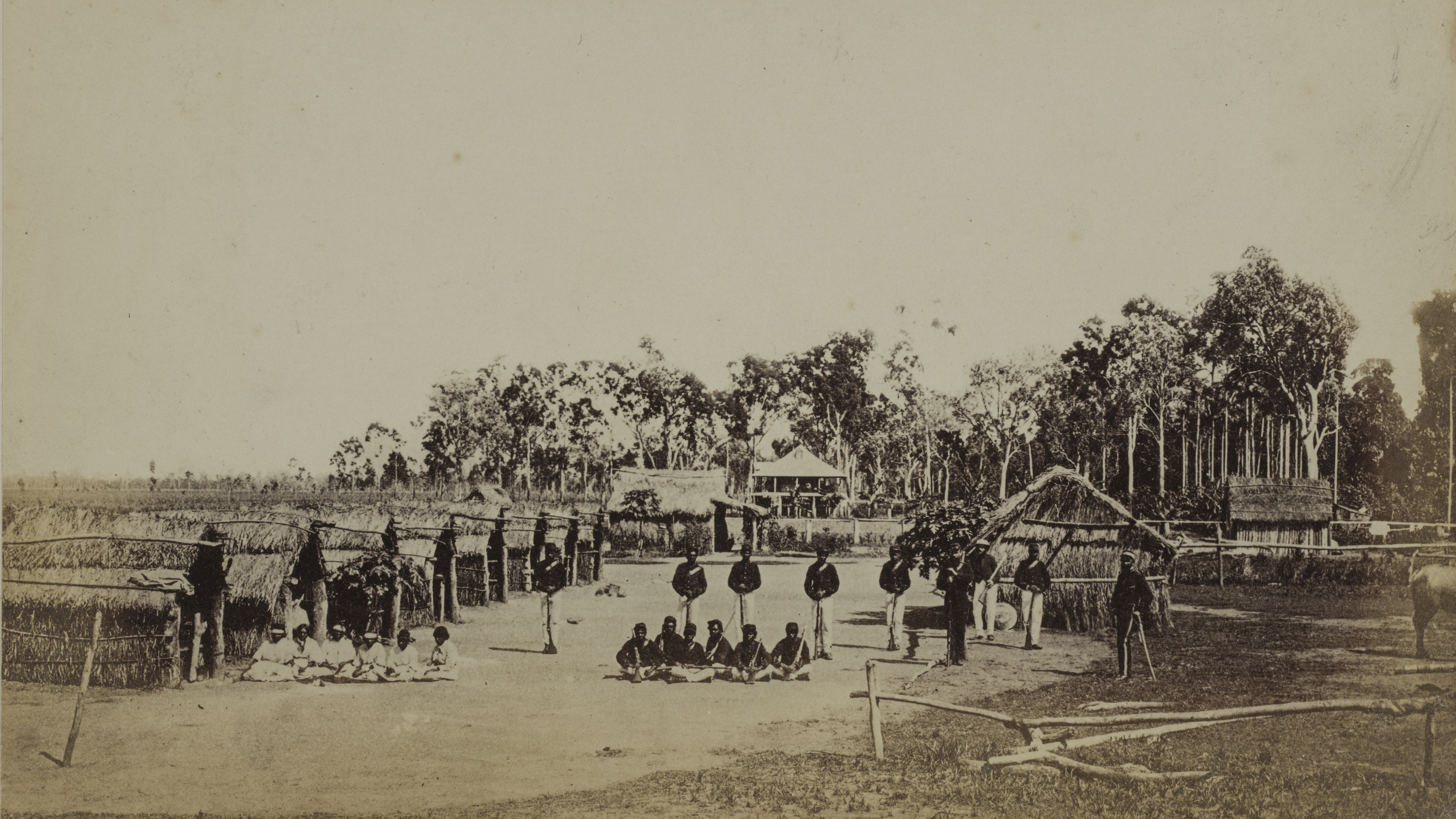
Herbert River Native Mounted Police Camp (Sub-Inspector Johnstone is fourth from right)

=== Gould Island killings (January 1872) ===
In January 1872, dugong fishermen Henry Smith and Charles Clements were killed by Aboriginals on Gould Island. Accompanied by a number of local Cardwell squatters including Philip Frederic Sellheim, Johnstone and his troopers scoured the island and nearby Hinchinbrook Island, finding a fishing net and two boxes.

=== Punitive expeditions after the wreck of the Maria (March 1872) ===
On 26 February 1872, the brig Maria carrying 75 people of a gold prospecting expedition to New Guinea was wrecked upon Bramble Reef. The survivors escaped the sinking ship on 3 boats and 2 rafts. Two of the boats made it safely to the nearest British settlement of Cardwell, but the other three craft were washed up on beaches to the north of the town. Up to ten of these crew members, including the captain, were found to have been killed by Aboriginals residing in this region. Lieutenant Sabine of the Royal Navy happened to be in Cardwell at this time and led a mission to recover the boat, which they found and were preparing to re-float. As the men were preparing a meal about 120 Aboriginal men rushed towards the boat. In response, the group open fire, killing 8 native people. Brinsley Sheridan, who wanted to secure the safety of Cardwell, ordered Johnstone with his troopers "to inflict decisive punishment". Johnstone was aided by another Royal Navy officer in Captain John Moresby who also had sailed into Cardwell as part of his expedition to New Guinea. Moresby provided additional armed marines and a large schooner for Johnstone to fulfil his mission. Moresby described how the Aboriginal Native Police troopers surprised one camp of Aboriginals with "unrestrained ferocity", resulting in the deaths of several Aboriginal people. A six-year-old boy was brought back from the raid and sent for education to England by Mr. Hayter. The boy died there from disease of the lungs three years later.

Johnstone and his troopers, together with armed sailors and volunteers, scoured the coast from Cardwell north to Cooper Point, searching every Aboriginal camp they came across. A member of this party later wrote that Johnstone "spoke of killing whole camps, not merely men but girls and piccaninnies" during these raids. Johnstone apparently bragged that the Premier of Queensland, Arthur Hunter Palmer, approved of his methods and protected him from any possible recriminations. The statements were denied by Johnstone in 'the most emphatic manner'. Newspapers reported that Johnstone's detachment of Native Police killed a total of 93 local Aboriginals in the Maria reprisals. Accusations of mass murder by Johnstone even reached the Permanent Under-Secretary of State for the Colonies in London, Robert Herbert. A subsequent investigation by the Queensland government condoned Johnstone's actions on the grounds that the Aboriginals of the north were "savage and treacherous".

=== Wyandotte Station killings (July 1872) ===
A travelling correspondent to the Valley of Lagoons area by the name of Richard Bird Hall wrote several letters to the Queensland Government and to various newspapers about the murderous actions of Johnstone and his troopers. In particular, a massacre of Aboriginals working on Walter Jervoise Scott's Wyandotte run conducted by Johnstone caused a minor scandal. Eight Gugu-Badhun men and two women were killed with most of the corpses "left exposed on the roadside till they stank". The government and the commissioner of police, David Thompson Seymour, defended Johnstone's actions and he was promoted to full sub-Inspector not long after this.

=== Valley of Lagoons dispersals (1872) ===
During the early 1870s, Johnstone was stationed at various outposts of the massive Valley of Lagoons Station owned by Walter Jervoise Scott. Johnstone describes how the Gugu-Badhun who speared livestock on this property which was once their land were punished in most cases by general massacre. However, he does point out that on one occasion he only shot dead the dogs of the Aboriginals when it was discovered the main target, a man named Tallboy, had previously saved the life of a white man.

=== Herbert River dispersals (February and March 1873) ===
Johnstone reported to Police Commissioner Seymour that on 14 March near Mt Leach "I dispersed a large mob and returned to camp...on 21 February I succeeded in dispersing three mobs on the Seaview Range...and on 27 March on the Lower Herbert River I dispersed a large mob."

=== Green Island killings (April and July 1873) ===
In April 1873, the Goodwill vessel arrived at Green Island with 3 European crew and 5 Manbarra people press-ganged from Palm Island to collect and process beche de mer. The Aboriginals, including 3 men and 2 women, resented their treatment and killed two of the whites and stole the "Goodwill". The third, Daniel Kelly, escaped to nearby Oyster Quay Island to report the killings to another beche-de-mer fisherman named Philip Garland. The incident was reported to authorities in Cardwell and Police Commissioner Seymour ordered Johnstone via telegram to organise a punitive mission.

Johnstone and his troopers sailed to the area in their police boat and found the "Goodwill" abandoned and burnt on a beach in Trinity Bay where the modern-day community of Yarrabah is now located. "The blacks were given a proper warm reception" when Johnstone arrived and after proceeding inland for 3 miles his troopers dispersed another group of local Yidinji people first by firing on them from a distance and then charging amongst them. Johnstone's section then sailed to the mouth of what is now called the Mulgrave River and dispersed "a large mob of blacks" with gunfire. They then sailed further south to the Gladys Inlet (which is now known as the Johnstone River) where a large group of Aboriginals led by a very tall man decorated with pipeclay resisted the troopers' approach. Johnstone punished their "insolence" with gunfire and this leader was one of those killed in the shooting. Johnstone sailed a little further up the river towards its bifurcation, noting the dense jungles and thick soil which could be exploited for sugarcane farming despite the area being populated with Aboriginal people.

=== The Northeast Coast Expedition (September to December 1873) ===
In the latter quarter of 1873, Johnstone accompanied George Elphinstone Dalrymple in his Northeast Coast Expedition funded by the colonial Queensland government. This group was heavily armed with thirteen Native Police troopers assigned to the expedition. After leaving Cardwell and exploring Mourilyan Harbour, they sailed north to Gladys Inlet. Here Dalrymple renamed the river entering the inlet as the Johnstone River after his Native Police travelling companion.

After several days evaluating the potential of clearing this region of thick jungle for exploitation of cash crops such as sugar, the group sailed back to the mouth of the river. The expedition then sailed north to Trinity Bay and camped on Double Island. Needing water, Dalrymple directed Mr. Thompson towards the smoke from an Aboriginal beach camp on the mainland at a place now known as Palm Cove and Johnstone and his troopers proceeded there in the police boat. The group obtained water from a narrow lagoon about 2 miles long that ran parallel to the shore. While approaching the lagoon, a large number of Aboriginals came out of the camps and prevented Johnstone's advance. According to instructions, Johnstone did not fire a shot. When the Aboriginal group advanced to about 30 yards and were shipping their spears into their woomeras and were poised to throw, Dalrymple reporting that the "sniders opened upon them".

After this, the expedition sailed north to the Endeavour River where the land was quickly deemed unsuitable for agriculture. Whilst at anchor during midday, a local Aboriginal man was spotted taking a survey flag that was set up on a sandbank in the river. For this action, Johnstone, his troopers and others aboard the ship opened fire on this man who managed to escape despite many rounds being fired at him. The troopers "were wild to go over for the purpose of teaching the myalls better behaviour". Two men followed the tracks for about a mile but failed to reach the camp.

The expedition briefly returned to Cardwell before heading north again to another river inlet which Dalrymple named the Mulgrave River. Again this area was found to be populated by Aboriginals with numerous gunyah style houses, rafts and canoes observed along the banks. Johnstone and a number of troopers set out from here and managed to climb to the summit of Mount Bellenden Ker. At Constantine Point at the mouth of the Mulgrave River, Johnstone found a large gunyah and stole the mummified remains of an Aboriginal woman from it. Dalrymple's description was "The head of this mummy is small – the animal organs being developed to distortion, the mental being next to nil; in fact, it is of the very lowest type of human formation." Johnstone left two blankets and a tomahawk for "the bereaved relatives, who would doubtless rightly appreciate the exchange". The preserved corpse was given to the Museum of Brisbane. The expedition then travelled to rivers further to the north which Dalrymple named the Mossman River and the Daintree River. The final leg of their journey in December involved returning south to Cardwell. Along the way, they again stopped at the mouth of the Johnstone River where Johnstone found that a group of Aboriginals had dug up the remains of one of the crew members from the Maria shipwreck.

=== Albert and Edward incident (June 1874) ===
The crew of a sugar trading cutter by the name of Albert and Edward which anchored in Challenger Bay off Palm Island, kidnapped some local Aboriginal women for sexual purposes. In response, the vessel was attacked by Palm Island men, who attempted to burn down the ship and kill the captain and the mate. Despite newspaper reports describing the attack as a "murderous outrage", both sailors were only wounded and escaped to report the incident at Cardwell. Johnstone was sent to Palm Island to punish the natives. On arriving there he found that the islanders had not run away because they thought they would all be shot if found in other localities. Johnstone demanded they give up the ringleaders otherwise "everyone will be punished". He decided not to indiscriminately kill the islanders on this occasion considering the kidnapping of the women, but told them they would be punished in the future if a similar attack on whites occurred.

=== Seymour River dispersal (January 1875) ===
After "the blacks" had robbed a hut at Dalrymple's Gap, sub-Inspectors Johnstone and Burrowes and their troopers tracked them to the coast at Seymour River estuary where they were "dispersed".

=== Retribution after the Conn killings (April 1875) ===
British settler William Conn and his wife were murdered by Aboriginals on their selection near what is now the modern town of Bemerside. For three days, Johnstone and his troopers searched all the native camps they could find in the mountains around the immediate region. At one of the camps they came across three Aboriginal women, one of who was gnawing on the severed feet of Mr. Conn. Another group "got their just deserts" when they were killed trying to flee to Hinchinbrook Island. After going to Cardwell to obtain some re-inforcements, Johnstone returned to the area and went on another punitive mission "until we caught them".

=== Founding of Cairns (1876) ===
Up until 1876, the area around what is now Cairns was simply known to the British either as Trinity Bay or Smith's Landing. It was also known as Battle Camp after beche-de-mer fisherman Philip Garland killed a number of Aboriginals there while stealing a canoe. In 1876, Johnstone with other Native Police officers in Alexander Douglas-Douglas and George Townsend, aided in the creation of a track from the Hodgkinson goldfields to the coast where Battle Camp became a port for the miners. This port was later named Cairns. In the same expedition, Johnstone sailed into the river to the north of Cairns, naming it the Barron River. He walked through the rocky areas and went as far as the Barron Falls, noting that the local Aboriginals were constantly indicating (from a safe distance) for his exploring group to go away.

=== Chilcott Islet and Dunk Island killings (February 1877) ===
Captain Thomas Harris of the schooner Douglas had three Aboriginals from the Dunk Island area to work loading guano and beche-de-mer from Chilcott Islet. During the night while the crew were sleeping, the Aboriginal men killed four of the crew after they had arrived at the islet, and took control of the ship. Two of the Dunk Islanders were killed by the ships crew during the re-taking of the ship, but the remaining one, a man by the name of Dungaree, escaped by swimming to a nearby island. He was later picked up and transported to Sydney for trial. Ominously, Johnstone himself describes a later patrol on Dunk Island as unnecessary as he "knew there was no blacks furthermore on this island." Dungaree was acquitted in Sydney but was forced to become a Native Police trooper under the command of Johnstone. After several years in the Native Police, Dungaree was advised by Johnstone that he could return to his tribe but "if ever they murdered a white man we would return and shoot all the men". Dungaree decided to stay in the force, but was killed not long after by "Burdekin blacks".

=== The Riser killings (1878) ===
The two man crew of the cutter Riser were found dead, supposedly killed by Aboriginals, after their vessel was wrecked near Sisters Island. Johnstone and troopers scoured the South Barnard Islands and along the mainland around Kurrimine Beach for Aboriginals. He "searched the camps..punished the murderers" and returned to his barracks at Cardwell.

=== Tam O'Shanter Point incident (November 1879) ===
Two white brothers who were robbed of their belongings and horses by around "40 male blacks" at Tam O'Shanter Point, reported the incident to Johnstone. He and troopers went out after them and Johnstone had the matter "satisfactorily seen to".

== Molonga cattle property ==
The area that had been used for the Native Police barracks at Palm Creek just east of Ingham became the property of Johnstone when he retired from the Native Police in 1881. He called the property "Molonga" meaning "devil-devil place" in a local Indigenous language, meant to frighten the Aboriginal people. Interestingly, the term Molonga was later used by Aboriginal people in western Queensland such as the Pitta Pitta to describe a corroborree depicting a white spirit who would cause havoc and steal young girls away. Johnstone utilised Molonga for cattle grazing, but later it was sold and became a famous lychee plantation. One of Johnstone's daughters, Ruby, continued the tradition of naming properties Molonga. She and her husband gave this title to their house in the Brisbane suburb of Graceville and Molonga Terrace in Graceville exists today where the property once was. She also called her beachside land at Burleigh Heads by the name of Molonga. This land was sold off and subdivided in the 1920s.

== Amateur naturalist ==
Throughout his career as a Native Police officer, Johnstone had the opportunity to collect plant and animal specimens that had not been seen by Europeans before. Probably the most notable was the freshwater crocodile which he found in abundance around the headwaters of the Herbert River. Johnstone sent the preserved remains of one to zoologist Gerard Krefft, who gave the scientific name Crocodilus johnstoni to the species in honour of Johnstone.

== Promotion to Police Magistrate ==
In 1881, Johnstone was promoted to Police Magistrate and posted at Winton. Here he broke his kneecap while riding and was transferred to Cooktown as a clerk of petty sessions in 1882. After a brief period back in Ingham as police magistrate and inspector of Pacific Islanders, he was transferred to Bundaberg as police magistrate there until 1887. From 1887 til 1891 he was police magistrate for the Maryborough region. In 1891, Johnstone retired from public service and in 1896 moved near to one of his married daughters in Beenleigh. In the early 1900s, Johnstone moved to the Brisbane suburb of Toowong.

== Spinifex and Wattle autobiography ==
By the early years of the 20th century the policy of the Queensland government towards Aboriginals had switched from one of violent repression to a system of control and incarceration. Archibald Meston, a government appointed Protector of Aborigines, started to publicly criticise the methods of the Native Police. These criticisms were acknowledged and publicly refuted by Johnstone. Johnstone wrote a series of autobiographical articles for The Queenslander newspaper giving details of his career in the Native Police. These were originally published in that paper in the years 1903 to 1905 and later were collated and published in book form in 1984.

== Death and legacy ==
Late in his life, Johnstone moved into a house on Archer Street in the Brisbane suburb of Toowong. He died here on 16 January 1905 and is buried at Toowong cemetery. He had nine children and some of his daughters married into notable families in Queensland society. His second daughter married one of the sons of Sidney Yeates a prominent landowner at Adavale. His third daughter married into the orchard owning Mullett family of Monduran, while his eldest married Edgar Young a prominent Beenleigh resident. While having the Johnstone River and the scientific term for the freshwater crocodile being named after him, a tragic aspect of Johnstone's legacy was his role in the destruction of Aboriginal society in northern Queensland.

== Sources ==
- Johnstone, Robert Arthur; Johnstone-Need, J. W. (James Walter), 1906– (1984), Spinifex and wattle : reminiscences of pioneering in North Queensland, J.W. Johnstone-Need, ISBN 978-0-9590470-0-4
