= Sellheim =

Sellheim may refer to:

== People ==
- Gert Sellheim, a German-Australian artist
- Hugo Sellheim, a pioneering physician in the field of gynecology and obstetrics
- Katharina Sellheim, born 1976, German pianist and academic
- Konstantin Sellheim, born 1978, German violist and academic
- Philip Frederic Sellheim, a pastoralist and mining official in Queensland, Australia
- Victor Sellheim, an Australian military officer during the Second Boer War and World War I

== Places ==
- Sellheim, Queensland, a town in the Charters Towers Region, Queensland, Australia
