= Walter David Taylor Powell =

English mariner and paramilitary Native Police officer

- Born: Walter Frederick David Taylor Powell; March 25, 1831; Bampton, Oxfordshire
- Died: December 23, 1906 (aged 75); Kangaroo Point, Queensland
- Burial place: Balmoral Cemetery, Brisbane
- Occupations: Mariner; Colonial police officer
- Spouse(s): Elizabeth; Eliza Finigan
- Children: 12
- Relatives: Lin Powell (great-grandson)

Walter David Taylor Powell (25 March 1831 – 23 December 1906) was an English mariner and paramilitary Native Police officer in the British colonies of New South Wales and Queensland. He played a significant part in the practical implementation of British colonial rule in the coastal areas of Queensland. His role as an officer in the Native Police was central in a number of important events in colonial Queensland history including that of the brutal supression of localised Aboriginal resistance after the Hornet Bank massacre and the foundation of Rockhampton and Bowen. He also had major contributions in the founding of Cardwell, the coastal and South Seas trade, and the British colonisation of the Torres Strait.

== Early life ==
Powell was born in Bampton, Oxfordshire in 1831 to Walter Posthumus and Matilda Pearl Powell. His full name was Walter Frederick David Taylor Powell. In 1838, his father was employed by the East India Company as an Archdeacon and consequently the Powell family moved to Madras. After three years there Walter returned to England for schooling. He was not academically inclined and chose a career at sea instead of finishing his formal education. He became a teenage midshipsman on various vessels including the Sutlej and the Vernon. In 1852, he arrived in the Australian city of Melbourne as third mate aboard trading vessel of Green & Co. The Victorian gold rush was occurring at that time, and Powell absconded from his ship to become a digger at Castlemaine, Victoria. He acquired not much more than dysentery and returned to England.

After failing in an attempt to join the Turkish Navy he returned to Melbourne in 1853 to try his luck on the Bendigo goldfields. His prospecting attempts again went poorly. At the time of his presence at Bendigo, the local government were reforming the armed escorts of the transportations of gold from the various diggings to Melbourne. The shooting of the McIvor gold escort in 1853 prompted this reorganisation and Powell was employed as a member of the reformed Gold Escort. He worked the Beechworth to Melbourne route from 1853 to 1855.

== Shipwreck of the Reindeer ==
In 1855, Powell wished to again return to England, this time with the view of enlisting in the Crimean War. He joined the crew of the vessel Reindeer which departed Melbourne in August 1855. On 5 September, the Reindeer ran aground on Pocklington Reef in the Louisiade Archipelago near New Guinea. The 19 crew members managed to stock and launch the longboat from the stricken vessel and initially sailed to mainland New Guinea but felt threatened by the Indigenous people they encountered there and so decided to head south on the prevailing winds to the nearest safe British port they knew of in Moreton Bay, Queensland. They started to run low on provisions at Lizard Island and subsequently went ashore at Cape Grafton to obtain food and water from the Aboriginals they observed there. Two crewmen decided to stay with the local people, but after a violent disagreement, they returned to the longboat just as it was departing with the other crew members firing upon the locals. The longboat made its way down the eastern coast of Australia, stopping where it could to obtain supplies of food and water resulting in further conflict with Aboriginals. On 25 November, they arrived in Port Curtis and were surprised to find the fledgling British outpost of Gladstone where they became re-acquainted with European civilisation.

== Officer in the Native Police ==
The settlement of Port Curtis, at this stage, had detachments of the Native Police stationed there. Lieutenant John Murray of the Native Police was present at Port Curtis when Powell and the other shipwrecked crew members arrived. As officers in the Native Police were in short supply during this period, Powell agreed to Murray's offer of being enlisted as a sub-Lieutenant into the force in December 1855.

=== Formation of Rockhampton ===
In June 1856, sub-Lieutenant Powell was called upon to escort Richard Palmer from Gladstone to the Fitzroy River, about 100 km to the north-west. Palmer wanted to establish a store at the tidal boundary of this river where the Archer brothers were transporting the wool from their newly established Gracemere property. Powell and his section of troopers travelled there and built a barracks, which became the first habitable dwelling of the colonial British township of Rockhampton. The barracks were located at what is now Col Brown Park at the end of Albert St near the river. Richard Palmer's shop was the second or third dwelling built and was located at the bottom of present-day Fitzroy St next to the Criterion Hotel. At the request of the Archer brothers for more armed protection against local Aboriginal confrontation, Powell later shifted his troopers to Gracemere.

== Hornet Bank massacre and Fanny Briggs case ==
In 1857, Powell was promoted to Lieutenant in the Native Police and transferred to the Eurombah barracks on the Dawson River. In October 1857, the Hornet Bank massacre occurred, where eleven settlers and station-hands were killed in a counter-offensive by local Yiman tribespeople. As the Hornet Bank property was not far from Eurombah, Lieutenant Powell was one of the first colonial law enforcers notified of the attack. He mustered his troopers and travelled to Hornet Bank where he immediately utilised his force to track down and kill five Aboriginals residing in the hills to the west of the property. A second, larger punitive expedition was organised with the participation of armed local settlers, including William Fraser whose family members figured prominently in the casualties of the massacre at Hornet Bank. On this mission, they shot dead a further nine people. By December 1857 Powell had increased the number of troopers in his division to seventeen, which he put to use by conducting raids at Taroom, shooting three including three native women as they tried to flee. Powell with William Fraser and 2nd-Lieutenant Robert G. Walker led another raid at Juandah shooting dead another eleven Aboriginals. In 1860, Powell applied for leave from the force and during this period he married Elizabeth Hitchcock in East Maitland.

In late 1860, Powell returned to active duty in the Native Police and was based at the Princhester barracks about 60 kilometres north of the new Native Police headquarters outside Rockhampton on Murray's Lagoon near modern-day Rockhampton Airport. Lieutenant John Murray had established the headquarters here, hence the lagoon being named after him. In November, a white barmaid by the name of Fanny Briggs was raped and murdered in the area. Initially, a group of Aboriginals camped near Gracemere were the suspected culprits. Commandant Morisset and Lieutenant Murray with their troopers went out to punish this group. At least two aboriginals were shot dead at Raglan Creek. With new information, suspicion then turned to four Native police troopers Toby, Gulliver, Johnny Reid and Alma, who were subsequently arrested. Gulliver was coerced into a confession and offered to show the authorities further evidence at Scrubby Creek near modern-day Fairy Bower. While leading some civil policemen there, Gulliver managed to escape. Powell and some of his other more reliable troopers were ordered to recapture him and after finding him near Wowan, they finally seized him after some cattlemen had detained him at a crossing on the nearby Dee River. Gulliver, although he was restrained and almost unconscious with inebriation, was shot dead by Lieutenant Powell "in order to prevent his escape". The waterhole his body was dumped in is still called Gulliver's Waterhole. The other arrested troopers met a similar fate. Toby "disappeared" after being escorted into the bush by some troopers, while Alma was shot dead at a riverbank by his captor while "trying to escape" despite being in leg-irons and handcuffs. Johnny Reid was found not guilty at trial and was released. In 1861, as part of a government enquiry into the Native Police, Powell and his fellow officers came under scrutiny for these killings of Aboriginal troopers and non-combatants but nothing came of it and Powell continued his career without any official censure. This was despite a number of members of the Queensland Legislative Assembly calling for Powell to be dismissed. The President of the Assembly also verified that Powell had "dealt in the same way with a blackfellow" on his station, calling him a murderer.

== Foundation of the Bowen and Cardwell townships ==
In early 1861, the Commissioner for Crown Lands in the Kennedy District, George Elphinstone Dalrymple led a large overland force to establish a British settlement at Port Denison. His force consisted of a Native Police division under the command of Lieutenant Williams. To augment this force, Dalrymple also sent a section of Native Police troopers on board the two ships which contained the settlers travelling to the area at the same time. This naval contingent was under the command of Lieutenant Powell. This two-pronged strike upon the area known to have several communities of Aboriginals in existence there, was planned so that it "would either strike terror, which would result in immediate flight, or enable a blow to be struck" upon these inhabitants. The plan had the desired effect with the Aboriginals fleeing from the site as both forces joined up.

This British settlement was initially called Port Denison, but in 1864 it become officially known as Bowen. Powell remained in the area with his troopers and formed a barracks just outside of the settlement. He was briefly discharged from his position after a disagreement with Dalrymple but was soon re-appointed. In 1861 Powell was involved in the clearance of Aboriginals from Strathmore, the first pastoral property formed in the region. This property was set up by Philip Frederic Sellheim and is still in existence, located on the Bowen River near Collinsville. During one of the skirmishes against the local Indigenous people, Powell noticed a small white man with the native people. His name was James Morrill and even though Powell thought he was a ringleader of the local Indigenous people, Morrill later became an appreciated member of Bowen society before his death in 1865. Powell was also stationed with his Native Police troopers at nearby Whitsunday Island to protect the timber operations of Eugene Fitzalan. This timber was used to construct the first British structures at Bowen. After the killing of a squatter and sailor at nearby Shaw Island by Aboriginals, Powell was the first officer notified.

In 1862, Powell was appointed harbourmaster at Bowen. Powell held the position as the head of the local Native Police in conjunction with the harbourmaster role until March 1863 when he retired from the force. Lieutenant Marlow replaced Powell as the local Native Police officer in Bowen. Powell continued as harbourmaster at Bowen until 1864, when he became captain of the schooner Policeman. One of his first voyages as captain and owner of this vessel was to conduct another expedition of settlement led by George Elphinstone Dalrymple in 1864. This time it was to found the township of Cardwell in Rockingham Bay. Powell took Dalrymple and his party including James Morrill and Lieutenant Marlow with his Native Police troopers in the Policeman from Bowen and landed them in the area and, despite Aboriginals in the area conveying their displeasure, the establishment of Cardwell was proclaimed.

== Later life ==
Powell only remained captain of the Policeman for a short time after the founding of Cardwell. He became employed by the Australasian Steam Navigation Company and was chief officer of the Telegraph before transferring as captain to the Sarah Barr which was wrecked at Trial Bay in 1866. Powell was a maritime officer upon various vessels trading along the coast and out to the South Pacific islands up until 1874, and it appears that he was involved the blackbirding industry.

In 1874, Powell accepted a position as chief of the Water Police and Native Police at the Cape York outpost of Somerset. He was involved in maintaining order in the operation of the pearling industry and shipping through the Torres Strait. He worked there until 1878, dealing with various duties including salvaging shipwrecks.

In 1878, with the imminent closure of the Somerset settlement and transfer of officials to Thursday Island in the Torres Strait, Powell took up a position as a signalman on nearby Goode Island. In 1887 he was transferred to Cape Moreton as a lighthouse keeper, and in 1900 he was further transferred to Double Island Point lighthouse.

== Death and legacy ==
Walter Frederick David Taylor Powell died at his residence of 44 George St, Kangaroo Point on 23 December 1906. His coffin was draped in the Union Jack and one of his pallbearers was fellow harbourmaster and blackbirder, John Mackay. He is buried at Balmoral Cemetery, Brisbane. Powell had married twice. His first wife, Elizabeth (Lita) died in 1873 and he married his second wife, Eliza Finigan, in 1874. He had twelve children. Former Queensland state National Party politician and Minister of Education in Joh Bjelke-Petersen's government, Lin Powell, is a great-grandson of Walter Powell. Powell Street in Bowen is also named after him.
