= George Elphinstone Dalrymple =

Australian politician (1826–1876)

George Dalrymple
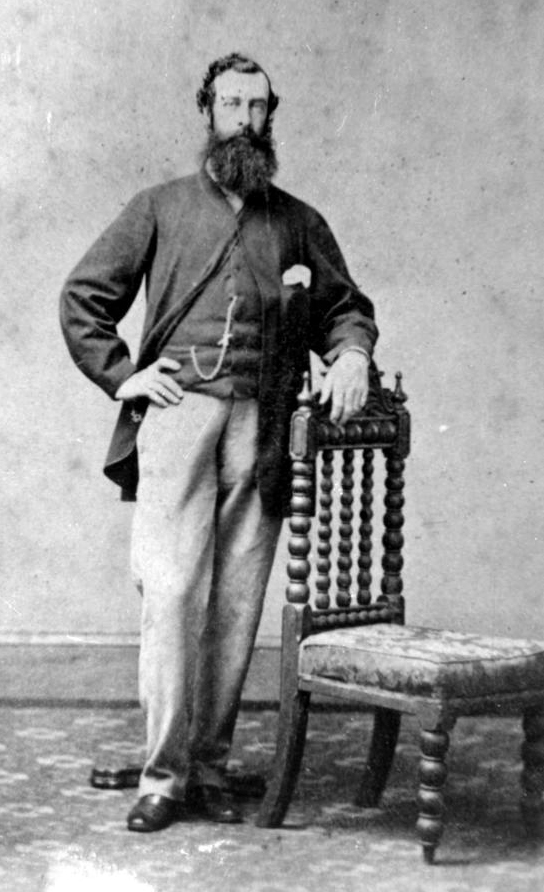

Member of the Queensland Legislative Assembly for Kennedy
- In office 18 March 1865 – 19 July 1867
- Preceded by: New seat
- Succeeded by: Thomas Henry FitzGerald

Personal details
- Born: George Augustus Frederick Elphinstone Dalrymple; 6 May 1826 Aberdeenshire, Scotland
- Died: 22 January 1876 (aged 49) St Leonards-on-Sea, Sussex, England
- Resting place: Hastings Cemetery
- Occupation: Explorer, Goldfields Commissioner, Station manager

George Augustus Frederick Elphinstone Dalrymple (6 May 1826 – 22 January 1876) was a colonist, explorer, public servant and politician. He was a member of the Legislative Assembly of Queensland. He founded the towns of Bowen and Cardwell, and pioneered the opening up of the Herbert, Burdekin, Johnstone and Daintree River regions to British colonisation. During this time he was responsible for many killings of Aboriginal people who lived in the area.

== Early life ==
Dalrymple was born in Scotland, the tenth son of Sir Robert Dalrymple Horn Elphinstone, Bart., by his marriage with Graeme, daughter of Colonel David Hepburn.

== Ceylon ==
In the mid-1840s, Dalrymple moved to the British colony of Ceylon where he became a coffee plantation owner in the Central Provinces. Much of the land used to establish these plantations had been confiscated from local peasants, who were left both landless and unemployed, because imported Tamil coolies were used as labour. Discontent over their loss of land led many Sri Lankan peasants to revolt in 1848, in what is known as the Matale rebellion. Dalrymple was a prominent plantation owner during this period and publicly defended the Governor of Ceylon, Lord Torrington, who was recalled due to the harsh methods he used to suppress the rebellion.

== Queensland ==
He arrived in Australia in 1857 and travelled to the Darling Downs where his deceased brother, Ernest Elphinstone Dalrymple, had been a pioneer of British colonisation establishing the Talgai pastoral run in 1840. Hoping to acquire land, George instead became a sheep station superintendent, managing James Charles White's Jondaryan property. In 1858, he was appointed to the position of a local magistrate by the colonial government.

=== 1859 expedition to the Burdekin River ===
In 1859 Dalrymple led an expedition to assess the uncolonised Burdekin River catchment area for pastoral occupation. This group included Ernest Henry, Philip Frederic Sellheim, Robert Phippen Stone, James Hood and Richard Haughton. The party left Rockhampton with two Aboriginal guides. They travelled west through the region and then north to the Valley of Lagoons, making surveys on the Burdekin and Suttor Rivers and marking out promising runs for sheep. Ernest Henry and James Hood made their way back early to present their land claims, shooting at various local Aboriginal people and setting a dog upon them along the way.

Dalrymple and his remaining men then followed the Burdekin River through difficult terrain and monsoonal weather to the coast at Upstart Bay. There they had two skirmishes with a large group of resident Aboriginal people, which involved the expedition members charging at them on horseback. The expedition returned to Rockhampton in March 1860.

The area Dalrymple explored was known as the Kennedy district. This was a part of New South Wales at the time the expedition commenced, but on returning it had become part of Queensland, which had been declared a separate colony. The new Queensland Government rescinded Dalrymple's claims to land in that region, but in compensation Dalrymple was appointed to the position of Commissioner of Crown Lands for the Kennedy district.

=== 1860 expedition to Cleveland Bay and Port Denison ===
In 1860 Dalrymple led a second expedition north, this time by sea. He was accompanied by Lieutenant Joseph W. Smith, Robert Phippen Stone and Eugene Fitzalan on the schooner Spitfire. They landed on Brampton Island where they encountered a group of Aboriginal people, and soon after traded with two Aboriginal men in a canoe near Hook Island. They arrived in Port Denison in September. Stone Island, in Bowen Harbour, was named after R. P. Stone. Dalrymple noted that the banks of the Don River near the harbour were lined with Aboriginal camps indicating a "very thickly" inhabited area.

The expedition then sailed north to Upstart Bay and Cleveland Bay. At Cape Cleveland, local Aboriginal people attempted to explain the presence of the shipwrecked James Morrill to Dalrymple through signs and gesticulations, however Dalrymple interpreted this as hostility and members of his group shot dead one of the Aboriginal men and wounded another. Because of this, he did not meet Morrill.

They landed on the shore near to where the modern city of Townsville now stands, where they met with a number of Aboriginal people, and gave them biscuits and tobacco. The Aboriginal people then began to touch and feel all the expedition members, and began "smacking their lips", which Dalrymple interpreted as an indication that they wanted to eat them. Another group of Aboriginal people came down, attacking them with a shower of stones and spears. Dalrymple and his men "were necessitated" to fire upon them, "repulsing them with loss." They landed again near to Cape Pallarenda to obtain surveys from the hilltops, but decided to descend to their awaiting dinghies when they noticed residents of three Aboriginal camps below were moving in their direction. These people were yelling and dancing "in a very hostile manner" and Dalrymple felt obliged to fire upon them. Dalrymple's group then made an "orderly retreat" to the dinghies halting at intervals to fire upon those throwing spears. Members of the crew that had remained upon the Spitfire had seen about eight armed Aboriginal men in canoes approaching them from nearby Magnetic Island in an apparent attempt to board the ship. They were repulsed by a discharge of the brass gun.

Dalrymple's party then returned to Port Denison to survey the area further in order to determine a suitable site for a township. Dalrymple recommended the northern corner of the port, because it was sheltered and supplied with fresh water from the wells belonging to the resident Indigenous people. Also, the country around was open forest and plains with an abundant supply of granite and pine, with easy access from all parts of the interior. The Aboriginal occupants of this area attempted to defend themselves from this incursion but were forced to retreat. Dalrymple's men then cleared the surrounding scrub and placed sentries. They excavated the [existing] wells into a larger repository of fresh water, in preparation for the future arrival of colonists. This site later became the township of Bowen.

=== 1861 expedition to establish the town of Bowen ===
In 1861, Dalrymple set out again to Port Denison with a group of colonists to establish the settlement on the site he had chosen. He led an overland expedition from Rockhampton, complemented by a concurrent naval contingent, to rendezvous at Port Denison. Dalrymple planned this two pronged entry into the area because "a sudden cooperation of land and sea forces..would either strike terror, which would result in immediate flight, or enable a blow to be struck" against the local Aboriginal people, of which many had been seen camped around the harbour. To facilitate this plan, Dalrymple travelled with Lieutenant Williams and six Native Police troopers, while Lieutenant Walter Powell and his troopers travelled on the ships. These ships were the Jeannie Dove and the Santa Barbara under the command of Captain McDermott.

The maritime group arrived first and waited for Dalrymple's overland party by camping on Stone Island at the mouth of the harbour. Dalrymple's group, which included 140 horses and 121 cattle, arrived on 11 April 1861. He rode down to the area on the foreshore in order "to clear off the aborigines from the same, should such be necessary" and to signal McDermott's group on Stone Island. The local people had already fled. The settlers on Stone Island then came over and the town of Port Denison (later called Bowen) was founded. Dalrymple wrote that it was "deeply gratifying to me to see the British flag flying over the spot where..a few days ago, the wild aboriginal held undisputed sway", and that the settlement marked "the advance of another great wave of Anglo-Australian energy."

Dalrymple was the chief officer and police magistrate of this new township, overseeing the entry of colonists into the port and the construction of the buildings. He also officiated over the response to the local Aboriginal people. Immediately, within the first six weeks of colonisation, the Native Police and armed volunteers conducted at least six operations against the Aboriginal people in the area, resulting in these people being driven off the land and also pursued by sea. The local people had little time to gather others from round about, to enable them to adequately make war against the newcomers. These actions by Dalrymple's crews culminated in the whole available force in the town being utilised in an engagement where a large group of Aboriginal people were "speedily put to rout with a loss sufficient to teach them a severe and it is hoped, useful lesson." The Aboriginal people were viewed by a correspondent of the Rockhampton Bulletin and Central Queensland Advertiser as "wretched caricatures of the human race...faithless stewards of the fine property on which they horde," and that it was "the duty of civilisation to occupy the soil which they disregard and disgrace." They claimed that "force and even severity may be necessary to restrain their brutal disposition." Dalrymple proved to be a popular chief officer, organising the Queen's birthday celebrations in Port Denison with "an approved style of loyalty."

=== 1862 expedition to the Burdekin River ===
In 1862, Dalrymple made another journey to the lower Burdekin River region concluding that the "richly grassed open forest country" would become "a most valuable addition to the pastoral and agricultural resources of the colony." This area was soon after opened up to pastoral occupation, and later became the sugarcane growing region around the present day township of Ayr.

=== 1864 expedition to establish the town of Cardwell ===
In January 1864, Dalrymple led an expedition to establish a port and township on the shores of Rockingham Bay. This port was to facilitate transport access to the Valley of Lagoons Station approximately 80km inland. Dalrymple was part of the company that established the Valley of Lagoons Station in 1862 after the area was opened up by the government. A partnership formed between Walter Jervoise Scott, his brother Arthur and Dalrymple, and Robert Herbert (then Premier of Queensland) financed the acquisition of the leasehold. The partnership became Scott Bros, Dalrymple & Company with Dalrymple acting as manager.

Dalrymple's group consisting of twenty men, including Captain Walter Powell, Lieutenant John Marlow of the Native Police, Philip Frederic Sellheim and James Morrill. They set out from Bowen on board the Policeman. They arrived in Rockingham Bay, and on 21 January, Dalrymple chose the most adequate site available for the new port. Morrill, who had a good knowledge of the local Aboriginal dialects after living with a nearby clan for 17 years, was asked to convey to the Aboriginal people that the group had come to take possession of the area. Morrill told them to clear out or they would be shot, with Dalrymple's men later setting upon a group of "armed blacks" leaving them "rather cut up". Dalrymple also documented a very neat village, bora grounds and pathways of these native residents. The new British port settlement was named Cardwell after Edward Cardwell, 1st Viscount Cardwell, the Secretary of State for the Colonies at that time.

=== 1864 expedition along the Herbert River ===
After establishing the site of the new township of Cardwell, Dalrymple set out to make a route to the Valley of Lagoons Station. After following a native path and cutting through thick jungle along the range behind Cardwell, the group found a valley of grassy plains intersected with bands of rainforest. A river meandered through this valley, which Dalrymple named the Herbert River, after his business partner and first Premier of Queensland, Robert Herbert. Dalrymple followed this river, which was inhabited by a tribe of Aboriginal people, up into the Seaview Range and to the Valley of Lagoons sheep station. Here he obtained supplies, men and livestock, and made a difficult journey back to Cardwell, expanding the path into a road of sorts. Land along the Herbert River valley was soon taken up by colonists, and the town of Ingham was later established.

== Politics ==
In 1865 Dalrymple decided to enter politics. This was despite having a recent falling out with a prominent member of the Queensland Public Service, in Augustus Gregory, and also assaulting John Jardine, the police magistrate of Rockhampton, with a riding whip. Jardine sued Dalrymple for slander, for which he received £500 in damages. He was elected in 1865, and served until 1866 as the first member for the Kennedy district in the Legislative Assembly of Queensland, under Robert Herbert as Colonial Secretary. In 1867 he chose not to re-contest, and sailed back to Britain for health reasons.

== Later life ==
In 1869 Dalrymple returned to Queensland and bought into the Oxford Downs pastoral station. However, this was a poor investment, and Dalrymple became insolvent. In October 1871, he was appointed Assistant Gold Commissioner for the Gilberton Goldfields, later becoming Police Magistrate for the region. But these goldfields were unprofitable for the prospectors, and shortly afterwards the site was abandoned.

=== North East Coast expedition of 1873 ===
In 1873, the Queensland government appointed Dalrymple to lead an exploring expedition to visit and report upon the uncolonised coastal lands north of Cardwell and assess them for their potential as areas for sugar production. On 29 September 1873, he departed from an anchorage near Cardwell accompanied by Walter Hill, Curator of the Botanic Gardens, as well as Sub-inspectors Robert Arthur Johnstone, Ferdinand Macquarie Tompson and 13 troopers of the Native Police. The expedition was aboard two cutters named Flying Fish and Coquette. They were soon joined by Philip Henry Nind who was sailing in the area looking for land to grow sugarcane.

They explored Mourilyan Harbour and made a bivouac at Camp Point where an Aboriginal campsite was located. They then went to Gladys Inlet where Dalrymple named Coquette Point, Flying Fish Point and the Johnstone River. They journeyed along the river, finding the region inhabited by many Aboriginal people who accessed the river with well made catamarans. They made camp themselves at Aboriginal settlements on the banks after the residents were first "moved on" or "dispersed" with volleys of gunfire. One of these bivouacs was named Nind's Camp, which later became the site of the township of Innisfail. Dalrymple trekked up the nearby Basilisk Range and observed that the whole Johnstone River region was a vast expanse of dense tropical jungle of large wild banana, cedar and palm trees interspersed with numerous other plants. The soil beneath the jungle trees was judged as unsurpassed for the cultivation of sugarcane.

The expedition then proceeded north to Trinity Bay where again they found a large Aboriginal population, who were notable for the large outrigger canoes with decorative prows that they constructed. Dalrymple camped on a site that later became the city of Cairns. It was also here that Dalrymple, suffering from fever, slipped on the deck, badly injuring himself. The expedition proceeded to Double Island where they camped for a few days to allow for Dalrymple to rest. On the mainland opposite, immediately after landing at a place later known as Palm Cove, a large number of Aboriginal people came out of their camps, and attempted to prevent the group's passage to the lagoon. It was only when the Aboriginal people were poised to throw their spears that they were repulsed by gunfire. After discovering the "unmistakable evidences of wholesale habitual cannibalism", such as "roasted and partially eaten bodies" in the camps of the Aboriginal people, all of the group "heartily rejoiced at the severe lesson which their unwarrantable hostility had brought upon them".

On 24 October, the expedition arrived at the Endeavour River. The next day, they were surprised by the approach of the vessel Leichhardt, on board which was Archibald Campbell MacMillan and 70 gold-miners, who had arrived to establish a port for the Palmer River Goldfields. Within a few days a settlement was created that was named Cook's Town after Captain James Cook, who had stopped there in 1770 for ship repairs. It later became known as Cooktown. While at the Endeavour River, a local Aboriginal man removed one of the surveying flags that had been set up to mark the newcomers' property at the town site. Johnstone's troopers and members of the Leichhardt expedition fired a barrage of shots at the man for doing this, however he managed to escape without being killed. Dalrymple's expedition then returned to Cardwell to obtain a larger vessel, to conduct the remaining exploration with. This vessel was the Flirt, on board which Dalrymple explored and named the Mulgrave, Russell, Mossmann and Daintree Rivers. Again, these rivers were bounded by thick rainforest and inhabited by Aboriginal people who cruised the rivers in outrigger canoes. Johnstone took the corpse of a local mummified woman from a hut while in this region, which Dalrymple later placed in the Brisbane Museum.

The expedition was judged to be complete and the group then sailed back to Cardwell, returning via Coquette Point where they a had skirmish with some Aboriginal people who had dug up the body of a shipwrecked sailor. Dalrymple wrote that the "outrages" of these "savage cannibals...can only be stayed by a still more copious effusion of blood". They arrived in Cardwell on 22 December 1873. Dalrymple, who had fallen from a horse before the journey and who had become very ill and further injured during the expedition, was granted leave of absence for some months after his return.

== Illness and death ==
Having partially recovered, Dalrymple was sent to Somerset as Government Resident, but became dangerously ill after two months, and would have died at that time had not the Torres Straits mail steamer taken him away and given him the benefit of medical attention. His illness, however, was of a protracted nature, and the Government gave him a year's leave of absence, on full pay, to enable him to visit England, in the hope of the trip restoring him again to health. However it failed to produce in him any permanent benefit, and he was never well enough to return to the colony.

Having spent about two years in England trying to recover from his illness, Dalrymple died in St. Leonards, Sussex, England and is buried in Hastings Cemetery.

== Legacy ==
The now-abandoned township of Dalrymple, Queensland was named after him, as was Mount Dalrymple, the Shire of Dalrymple, and the County of Dalrymple.

Parliament of Queensland
New seat	Member for Kennedy; 1865–1867	Succeeded by Thomas Henry FitzGerald
