= Williamson Airfield =

- IATA: none; ICAO: YWIS

Summary
- Airport type: Military
- Owner: Australian Army
- Operator: DCSO Rockhampton
- Location: Rockhampton, Queensland
- Elevation AMSL: 104 ft / 32 m
- Coordinates: 22°28′24″S 150°10′42″E

Map
- Location in Queensland

Runways
Direction	Length		Surface
Direction	m	ft	Surface
14/32	1,800	5,906	Asphalt

Williamson Airfield (ICAO: YWIS) is located near Rockhampton, Queensland, Australia within the Shoalwater Bay Military Training Area.

== Geography ==
=== Climate ===
Despite being north of the Tropic of Capricorn, Williamson has a monsoon-influenced humid subtropical climate (Köppen: Cwa) with a hot, wet summers and very mild, dry winters. The wettest recorded day was 25 January 2013 with 208.0 mm (8.19 in) of rainfall. Extreme temperatures ranged from 39.6 °C (103.3 °F) on 4 January 2022 and 12 March 2007 to −0.8 °C (30.6 °F) on 19 June 2018.

Climate data for Williamson (22.47°S 150.18°E) (28 m (92 ft) AMSL) (2005-2025)
Month	Jan	Feb	Mar	Apr	May	Jun	Jul	Aug	Sep	Oct	Nov	Dec	Year
Record high °C (°F)	39.6 (103.3)	38.9 (102.0)	39.6 (103.3)	34.5 (94.1)	33.2 (91.8)	31.3 (88.3)	31.1 (88.0)	32.2 (90.0)	35.3 (95.5)	35.6 (96.1)	39.5 (103.1)	39.1 (102.4)	39.6 (103.3)
Mean daily maximum °C (°F)	31.7 (89.1)	31.4 (88.5)	30.8 (87.4)	29.0 (84.2)	26.4 (79.5)	24.2 (75.6)	24.2 (75.6)	25.3 (77.5)	27.4 (81.3)	29.1 (84.4)	30.4 (86.7)	31.3 (88.3)	28.4 (83.2)
Mean daily minimum °C (°F)	23.0 (73.4)	22.9 (73.2)	21.8 (71.2)	18.4 (65.1)	14.3 (57.7)	11.5 (52.7)	10.0 (50.0)	10.5 (50.9)	14.0 (57.2)	17.6 (63.7)	20.2 (68.4)	22.0 (71.6)	17.2 (62.9)
Record low °C (°F)	17.1 (62.8)	16.1 (61.0)	14.0 (57.2)	8.1 (46.6)	3.5 (38.3)	−0.8 (30.6)	−0.1 (31.8)	−0.4 (31.3)	3.0 (37.4)	5.9 (42.6)	11.3 (52.3)	14.2 (57.6)	−0.8 (30.6)
Average precipitation mm (inches)	136.6 (5.38)	162.0 (6.38)	122.6 (4.83)	52.5 (2.07)	31.8 (1.25)	33.9 (1.33)	33.9 (1.33)	21.5 (0.85)	16.1 (0.63)	38.7 (1.52)	55.1 (2.17)	127.5 (5.02)	824.5 (32.46)
Average precipitation days (≥ 0.2 mm)	12.6	14.3	13.3	9.6	9.3	8.5	6.8	4.1	4.0	5.0	7.1	9.8	104.4
Source: Bureau of Meteorology (2005-2025)

== See also ==
- List of airports in Queensland
