= Dunbar Station (Queensland) =

Pastoral lease in Queensland

Coordinates: 16.04501°S 142.378922°E

Location in Queensland

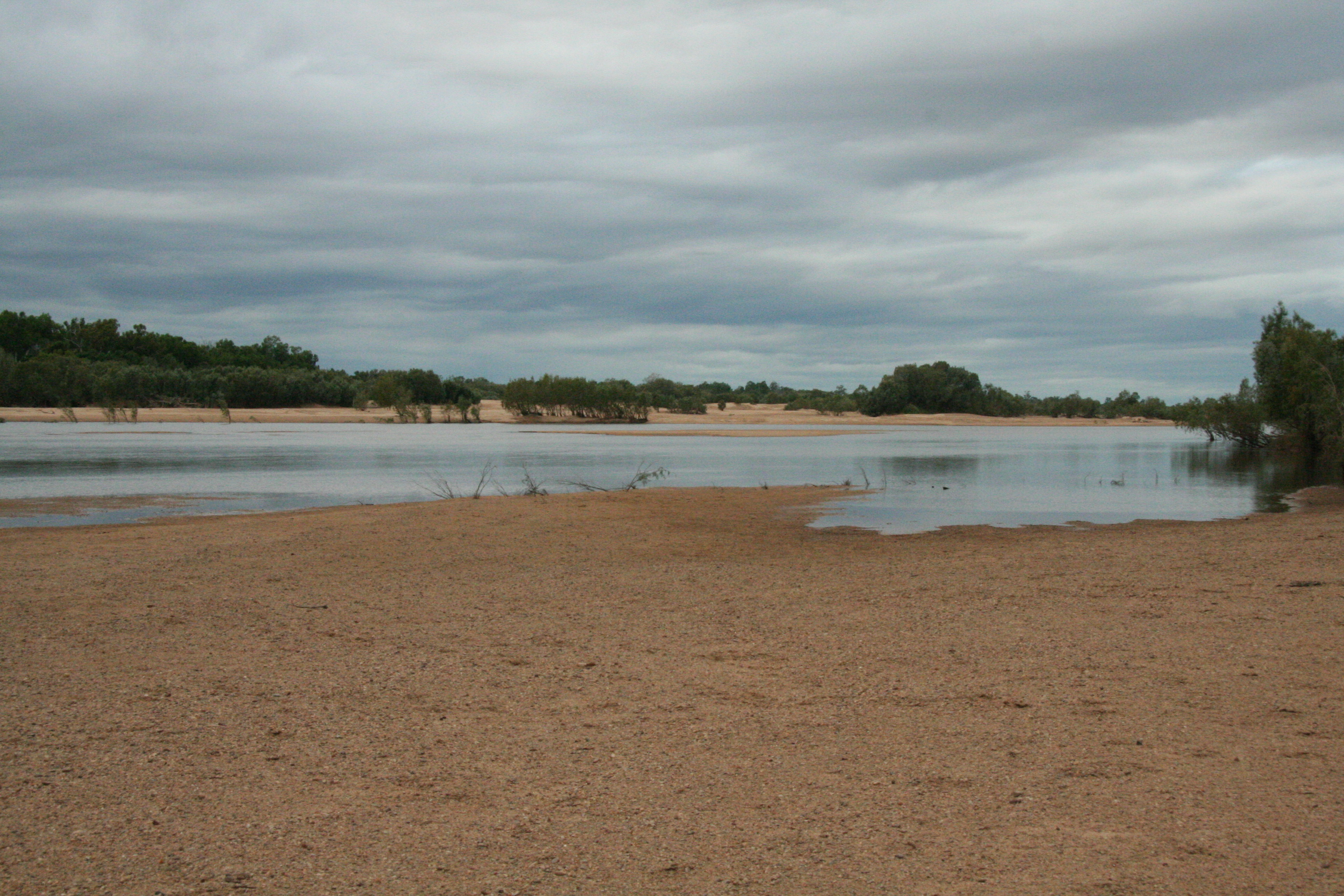
Mitchell River at Koolatah-Dunbar Crossing

Dunbar Station is a pastoral lease that currently operates as a cattle station in Queensland, Australia. The homestead is located on the Burke Developmental Road, Maramie in the Shire of Carpentaria.

== Description ==
It is located approximately 93 kilometres (58 mi) south east of Kowanyama and 227 kilometres (141 mi) north east of Normanton in the Gulf Country of Queensland. The property is situated within the Nassau River catchment with both the Nassau and the Mitchell Rivers also flowing through the property. An additional 13 creeks and 8 lagoons are found on the property all useful for watering stock. The country is composed of flat open plains with the soil being grey clay loam derived from the Cainozoic age, sands of Quaternary age with other alluvium. The vegetation is low open eucalypt savannah surrounded by coarse grasses.

== History ==
The property had been established at some time prior to 1883 on Ngundjan tribal lands and was owned by Thomas Hungerford and sons. The Hungerfords placed the 1,000-square-mile (2,590 km^{2}) property on the market in 1889. It was stocked with 10,000 head of cattle at this time but it was estimated that it could carry up to 30,000 head.

By 1913 the property had been put up for auction by the mortgagees. At this time it occupied total of 1,462 square miles (3,787 km^{2}) and was made up of the Dunbar, Clark's Creek and Meranginna Leases. Stocked with 12,297 cattle and 236 horses, the property boasted a homestead, three branding yards, 12 tailing yards and two horse yards.

The station was sold in 1929 to J. S. Love of Townsville for £50,000. At this time the property encompassed an area of 3,700 square miles (9,583 km^{2}) and was stocked with 18,000 head of cattle. Love had also recently acquired other properties in the gulf area, Gainsford and the Valley of Lagoons Stations.

In 1954 the property was still owned by J. S. Love Estates and was being managed by John McRae. The 3,777 square miles (9,782 km^{2}) was stocked with approximately 20,000 cattle; all profits from the station were given to charity.

Don McDonald, the eldest son of Jim McDonald, acquired Dunbar in 1991. In 2007 Dunbar was still privately owned by the McDonald family and managed by Peter and Debra Hagan. The property occupied an area of 3,000 square miles (7,770 km^{2}) and was stocked with 35,000 head of Brahman cattle. Dunbar is currently owned by MDH, owned by the McDonald family, and is one of the company's 11 cattle stations throughout Queensland.

== See also ==
- List of ranches and stations
- List of the largest stations in Australia
