= Alexander Douglas-Douglas =

Naval officer

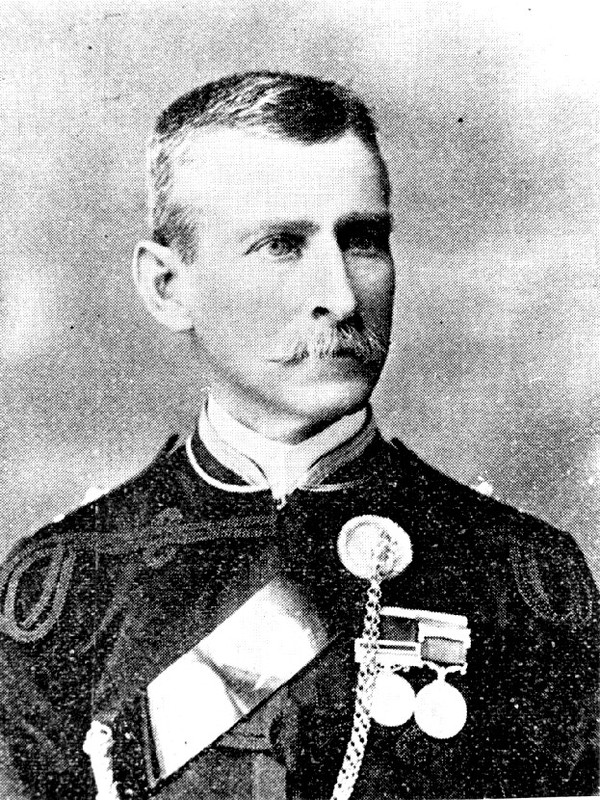
- Born: 7 February 1843; St Helier, Jersey, Channel Islands
- Died: February 5, 1914 (aged 70) near Portsmouth, England

Alexander Douglas Douglas (7 February 1843 – 5 February 1914) was a naval officer, an inspector in the Native Police and a chief inspector of police in Queensland.

== Early life ==
Douglas was born on 7 February 1843 at St Helier, Channel Islands, son of Alexander Douglas Douglas, formerly Mackenzie, an army officer, and his wife Ann, née Rouse. He was the grandson of Sir Kenneth Mackenzie, who was a colonel in the 58th Foot and was created a baronet 30 Sep 1831 and assumed by Royal Licence 31 Oct 1831 the name and arms of Douglas of Glenbervie.

== Royal Navy ==
In 1857, he joined the Royal Navy as a cadet on HMS Illustrious and then served on HMS Diadem. In 1859 he joined HMS Centaur to fight in the Second Opium War serving in the Tientsin campaign of the Battle of the Taku Forts. Douglas then joined HMS Encounter and was based mostly at Yokohama. In 1862, the Taiping Rebellion had advanced in China and the trading port of Shanghai was threatened. HMS Encounter was ordered into the area and Douglas was involved in the bombardment and assault on Ningbo. Encounter afterwards returned to Yokohama and played a minor role during the bombardment of Kagoshima. Douglas saw no future pathways of promotion and left the navy in 1865, migrating to Australia.

== Cattle work in Queensland ==
Douglas arrived in Rockhampton in late 1865 and took up a job as a teamster and station-hand at Nulabin pastoral station near Duaringa. After drought destroyed his livelihood, Douglas then became a drover for a time before using his navy connections to again change careers.

== Native Police ==
Douglas joined the paramilitary Queensland Native Police in 1872 on the recommendation of Acting Queensland Police Commissioner Thomas Barron, who served in the military with Douglas during the Opium Wars. Douglas was trained as a cadet in this force by the notoriously brutal officer, Frederick Wheeler, and his first posting was at the Marlborough barracks in central coastal Queensland.

=== Marlborough operations ===
Douglas was appointed Acting Sub-Inspector at Marlborough, north of Rockhampton, in early 1873. A correspondent for the Northern Argus wrote that Douglas should give "salutary lessons" to the local Aboriginal people. It was reported that Douglas and his Aboriginal troopers killed several Aboriginals at Calliope. An enquiry was held at Prospect Hotel in Calliope headed by other police officers. Evidence was submitted that Douglas shot an Aboriginal man when he tried to escape. Douglas was exonerated of charges of wantonly destroying life. In 1873 Douglas led a large patrol through The Peninsula station near Shoalwater Bay and around the adjacent islands. Later in 1873, Douglas' entire detachment of troopers deserted with allegations of floggings and cruel treatment by Douglas being the reason.

=== Cooktown operations ===
In early 1874, Douglas was transferred north to the Cooktown region where he and his troopers patrolled the Palmer River, Normanby and Hodgkinson goldfields. He blazed the Hell's Gate trail from the Palmer goldfields to Cooktown and led several extrajudicial "dispersals" of Aboriginals. In late 1874, after the killing of the Stroh family travelling to the Palmer River, Douglas led severe reprisals against Aboriginals in the area. Newspaper articles reported that "the blacks...died the death they so richly deserved and...we may hope that his Sniders will reach a few more of them." A journalist in Cooktown at the time recalled how Douglas' troopers would make notches on the stocks of their rifles for every person they killed in the "nigger raids". One had 25 notches of which nine were added in a week. In 1875 Douglas completed further "dispersals" near both the Normanby River and the Laura River, and in 1876 he "had a long run after blacks" near the Mitchell River.

=== Cairns operations ===
In September 1876, Douglas led a group from Thornborough on the Hodgkinson goldfield to construct a trail to the coast at Trinity Bay. This he achieved with another Native Police officer in Robert Arthur Johnstone blazing a trail from the other direction, the two groups meeting to complete the track at the top of the range. This trail was given the name Douglas' Track and opened the way for the founding of a port in Trinity Bay which, later that year, was named Cairns. Douglas remained in the Cairns area, patrolling the district up to the Mossman River, until 1879 when he was replaced by sub-Inspector Carr.

=== "Black Douglas" ===
After a brief posting at the Native Police barracks in Blackall in western Queensland, and also a period working for the general police in Brisbane, Douglas was back in northern Queensland in 1882. He was assigned to the Native Police unit at Herberton from where he blazed another trail to the coast, this time to Mourilyan Harbour. When in charge of Mourilyan Native Police camp, he used SS Vigilant, a small steamship, to patrol the coast. While in this position, he was criticised in the colonial press for both wasting government funds and severe cruelty to the troopers under his charge. He was given the title "Black Douglas" for his "continued barbarity to the niggers". In 1883, he was ordered back to Brisbane and was soon leading native troopers in the capture of escaped blackbirded Kanaka labourers.

== Queensland Police Service ==
In 1884, Douglas was appointed to the normal police force and posted to Townsville where he was promoted to Inspector. In 1885, during the 'Russian scare', because of his naval experience, he was appointed commander of HMS Otter, a wooden paddle packet.

In 1886, after a brief period at Roma, Douglas was sent to Georgetown and placed in charge of the Gulf district. In this role, he was in charge of both the general and the Native Police located in the district which stretched from Mount Surprise to Camooweal. He often led the gold escort from the Etheridge goldfields which consisted of up to 13 armed native troopers guarding the transport with 56 horses. He was later responsible for the largest gold escort recorded in Queensland. Douglas was also involved in the resolution of high-profile crimes, such as the Normanton race riots of 1888 and the liquidation of the Aboriginal outlaw, Joe Flick, in 1889. Flick had shot dead Native Police officer Alfred Wavell and injured the famous colonist Frank Hann at Lawn Hill pastoral station.

In 1891, Douglas was in charge of the police force involved in the breaking up the shearers' strike at Barcaldine, arresting and transporting the leading unionists. With the frontier wars against Aboriginals in Queensland coming to an end, and British colonial government policy switching to control rather than Native Police dispersion, Douglas' opinion on native matters was sought after. In a precursor to the Aboriginal Protection Act of 1897, Douglas advocated tight police command over the remaining Indigenous population with compulsory permission required for travel, employment and food rations.

In 1893, he was transferred and placed in charge of the Maranoa Region and five years later was promoted to chief inspector of the Queensland Police in the northern regions. In 1900, Douglas was transferred to Brisbane to be the chief inspector for the Queensland Police and while in this position, Douglas took on the role of Acting Queensland Police Commissioner on four occasions.

Douglas retired from the Queensland Police in 1905, when he returned to England.

He died on 5 February 1914, near Portsmouth.

== Family ==
He was a widower when, on 19 April 1884, he married Lucie Street. They had no children. She died on 13 May 1905. The following year he married, as his third wife, Susan Williams.
