= Shoalwater Bay =

Coordinates: 22.41667°S 150.41667°E

Shoalwater
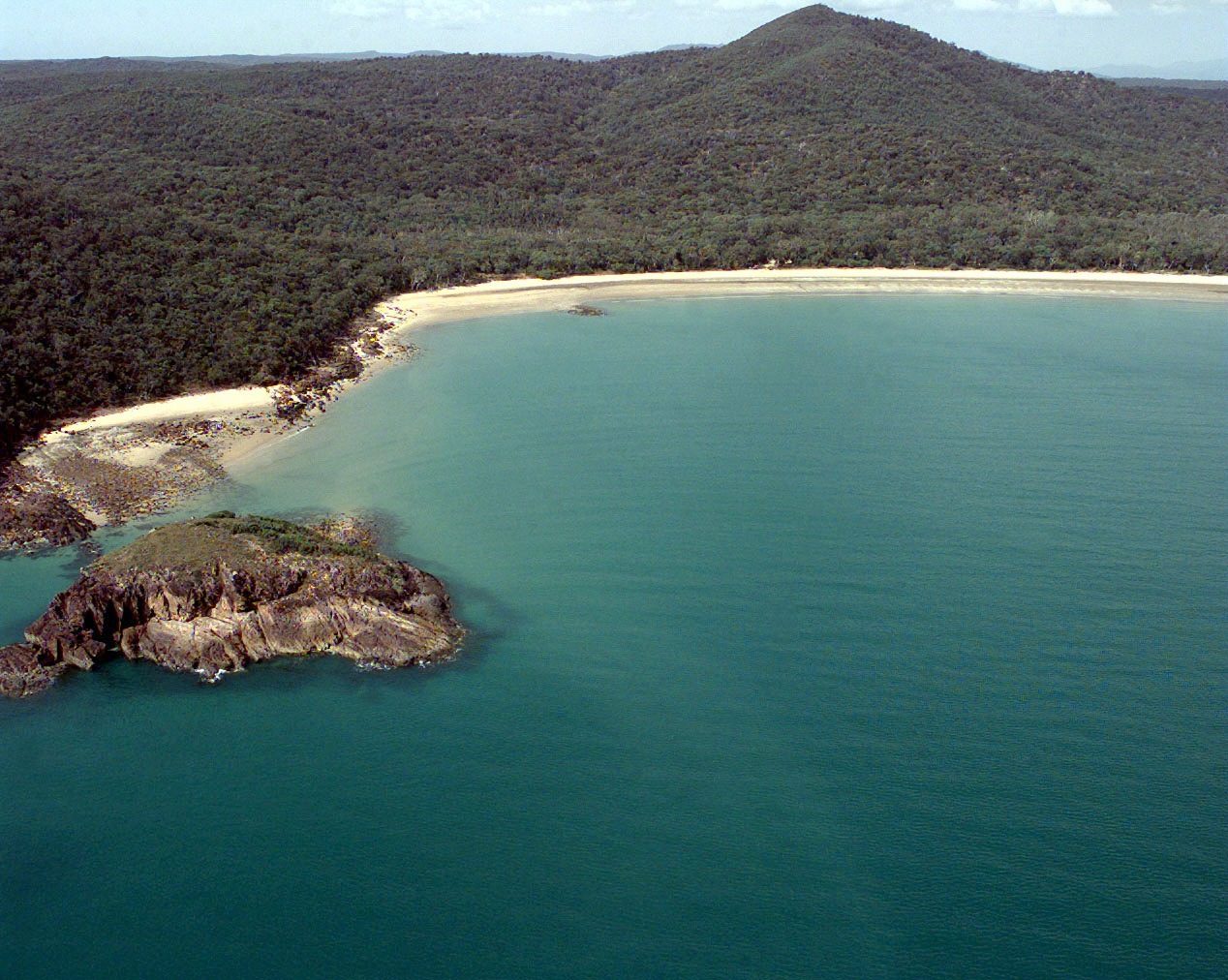
- Freshwater Bay in the Shoalwater Bay Military Training Area

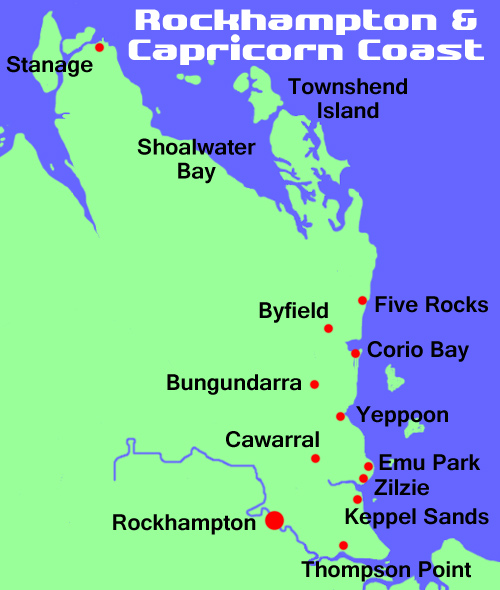
- Shoalwater Bay in the north of the Capricorn coast region

Location
- Country: Australia
- State: Queensland
- Region: Central Queensland

Basin features
- Protection status

Ramsar Wetland
- Official name: Shoalwater and Corio Bays
- Designated: 1 March 1996
- Reference no.: 792

Shoalwater Bay is a large bay on the Capricorn Coast of Central Queensland, Australia 100 km north of the coastal town of Yeppoon and 628 km north-north-west of the state capital, Brisbane. Since 1966, the land surrounding Shoalwater Bay has been under the ownership of the Australian Defence Force, for the purpose of military training exercises. Shoalwater Bay is also a noted dugong habitat and is part of the Great Barrier Reef Marine Park. The bay is bounded by the Torilla Peninsula to the west and the Warginburra Peninsula and Leicester and Townshend islands to the east.

== History ==
=== Pre-colonial ===
The traditional inhabitants of Shoalwater Bay are the Darumbal people.The Darumbal (Tarumbul, Tharoombool) language region includes the city of Rockhampton extending south towards Raglan Creek and north towards the Styx River and inland along the Broad Sound Ranges. Specific tribes that lived and in some cases continue to live in the area include the Cookeeburra (green-headed ant people of the Warginburra Peninsula), the Risteburra (the sandfly people of Raspberry Creek), the Cooinmurburra (the plains people of Torilla) and the Woppaburra (the people of the islands in the region).

=== Colonial ===
The first recorded European to sight Shoalwater Bay was British navigator James Cook on 28 May 1770. Cook referred to the entire region, from Cape Palmerston (south of Mackay) to Cape Townshend, including Shoalwater Bay, as the "Bay of Inlets", a name which is no longer in use. Cook bestowed the name "Shoalwater Bay" on the southeasternmost of these bays, a reference to the number of sandbars in the bay. Following Cook, Matthew Flinders conducted further exploration of Shoalwater Bay in 1802, landing on Akens Island (a small island on the western side of Shoalwater Bay) and exploring the head of the bay. Flinders described the land as such:

The hills are stony, but some of them are clothed with grass and wood, and the pine grows in the gullies between them. The low land is sandy or stony, but covered with wood & herbage. Fresh water stands in ponds at the foot of the hills.

European colonisation of the land in Shoalwater Bay region commenced in 1858. By the early 1860s, it had been divided into four pastoral stations: Tilpal, Raspberry Creek, The Peninsula and Torilla. The process of colonisation was violent with the killings of settlers and the massacres of local Aboriginal people being recorded frequently until the mid 1870s.

==== Tilpal ====
Tilpal was formed as a sheep station in the late 1850s by "Hobby" Elliott. Not long after establishing Tilpal, Elliott and his shearers had a skirmish with the local Aboriginal people which resulted in the death or severe wounding of two of his workers and seven Aboriginal men being shot. The Native Police were called in and they tracked down "the blacks" to Torilla Hill where some more were shot. Elliott later sold Tilpal to James Black and a minor gold rush occurred on the property in the late 1860s.

==== Raspberry Creek ====
Raspberry Creek was initially taken up by James Ross and James Hutton. Hutton commenced building the Raspberry Creek Homestead and brought his family to the station in 1861. The resident Risteburra people speared Hutton's cattle and the Native Police were called in to "disperse" the tribe. Many were shot or fell from cliffs after being pursued by the troopers into the Polygon Range. Raspberry Creek remained under the ownership of the Hutton family until 1917.

==== The Peninsula ====
The Peninsula Station was taken up by Edward Hampton Baker (also known as "Cranky" Baker), which encompassed the entirety of the area today known as the Warginburra Peninsula. Baker was consistently at war with the local Cookeeburra people who took his rations and speared his cattle. Baker booby-trapped his house with self-firing rifles and poisoned the Cookeeburra with arsenic-laced flour. Native Police operations occurred frequently in the 1860s on The Peninsula with Baker being pleased with the efforts of Inspectors Aubin and Compigne "to inspire the natives with a wholesome respect for their Majesty's colors." Baker offered money to Rockhampton residents to shoot Aboriginal people on his property, and threatened to place an advertisement in the local newspaper offering "a premium for scalps" if the government did not provide him with even more assistance against "the blacks." In 1873 Inspector Alexander Douglas of Native Police led a large patrol through The Peninsula and around the adjacent islands. A local colonist later described the operation:

"the blacks were robbing huts and doing other damage on The Peninsula, when the owner asked for police protection. The authorities gathered several detachments, and by marching in open order from one end to the other of the Peninsula, actually drove them, like a RABBIT OR KANGAROO DRIVE into the sea, shooting any that broke back. The rest took to the sea to swim to an island, but a boat was handy, and the police got in and shot all they could when swimming. When the Inspector wired to his chief to inform him he had "dispersed" seventy blacks, a reply was received in writing as follows: — A native police officer is supposed to do his duty without making it public."

In 1876, Baker sold The Peninsula to James Hutton owner of the neighbouring Raspberry Creek property, and became a travelling photographer.

==== Torilla ====
Torilla was formed by British colonist Frank Newbold in 1858. Newbold did not allow the local Cooinmurburra people to be present upon what was now viewed as his property and conflict ensued. In 1868, around forty Cooinmurburra attacked the Newbold's homestead, fatally wounding his son William Newbold. Around twenty Aboriginal people were shot dead. The Newbold family and their relatives, the Rogers family, retained the Torilla run for many decades afterwards. The town of Stanage on the Torilla property was established by the Rogers family in the early 1870s and was named after their hometown in the United Kingdom.

== Shoalwater Bay Military Training Area ==
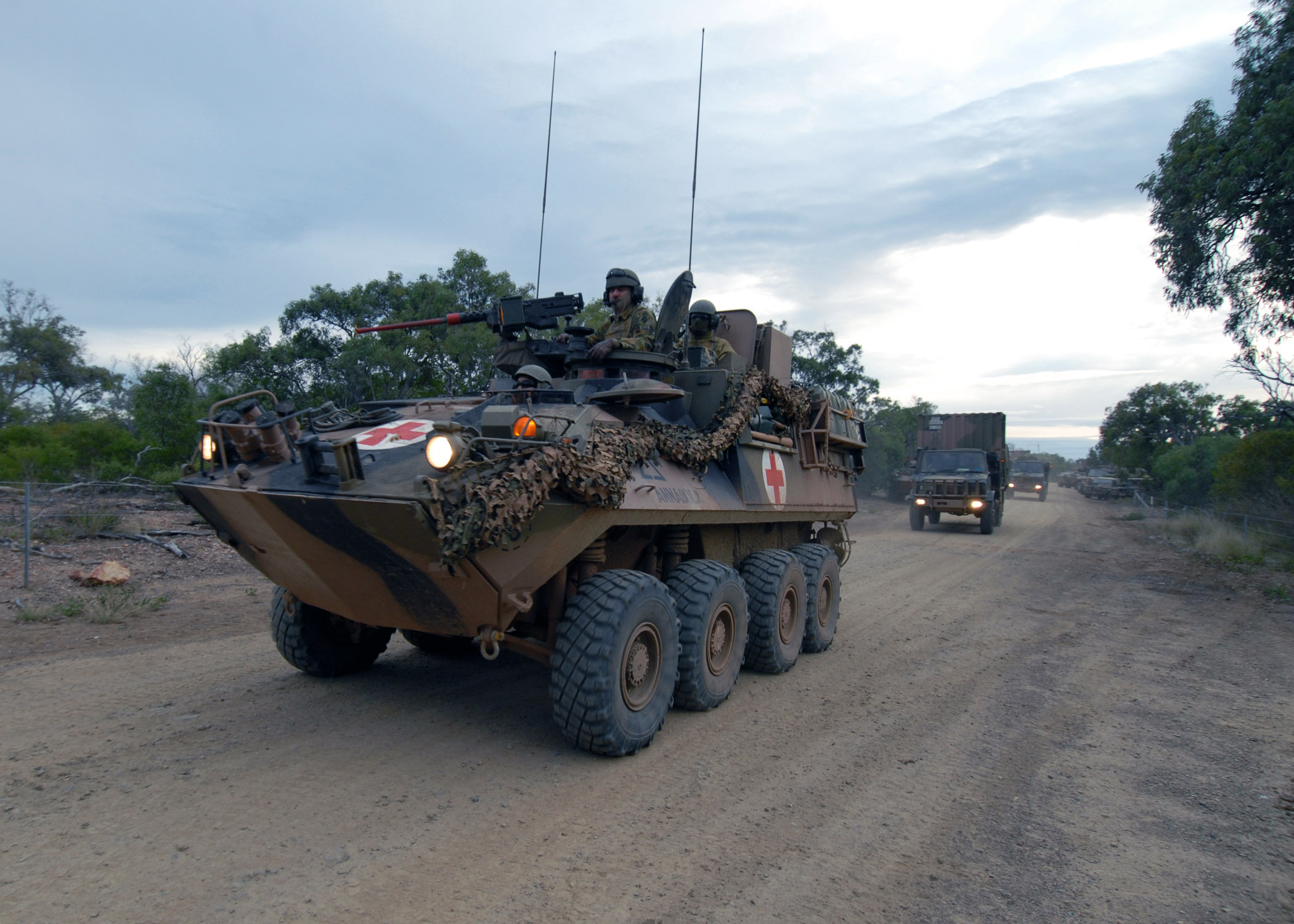
An ASLAV from the 2nd/14th Light Horse Regiment at the Shoalwater Bay training area

The Shoalwater Bay Military Training Area encompasses 4,545 km^{2}, which includes the Warginburra Peninsula, the Torilla Peninsula east of the Stanage Bay Road, Townshend and Leicester Islands, and a sizeable chunk of the Shoalwater Bay hinterland north of the village of Byfield. Suggestions that the Shoalwater Bay region be acquired for the purpose of a training ground first appeared in 1960. The army formally took control of the land on 1 July 1965; by the following year, the last landholder had vacated his property. The training area was used by troops who were deployed to the Vietnam War.

In 2005 the federal government entered into a long-term agreement with the US over the use of Shoalwater Bay for military training purposes. Similar agreements over a shorter time span have been agreed to with the Singapore Ministry of Defence, with a new military camp being completed in 2024.

Military exercises with the United States have aroused considerable controversy in the Rockhampton-Yeppoon area, due to the threat of environmental damage to the Shoalwater Bay region. In recent years, concern has been raised, although unfounded about the possibility of depleted uranium weaponry been used during training exercises at Shoalwater Bay. Peace activists protesting Exercise Talisman Saber were arrested in 2009.

Support for a permanent US presence has been expressed by the former Rockhampton mayor, Brad Carter in 2011, and by current mayor, Margaret Strelow.

7 August 2017: "The Australian Navy has located a missing US military aircraft that crashed off Australia's east coast on Saturday, Defense Minister Marise Payne said in a statement Monday. Three US Marines have been missing since what the Marine Corps calls a "mishap" with an MV-22 aircraft. Twenty-three of the 26 personnel on board the aircraft were rescued, the Corps said." The helicopter was from the ship, USS Green Bay.

== Environment ==
The bay contains one of the most important seagrass habitats in the Great Barrier Reef Marine Park. A plan of management for the bay's dugong population was released in 1997 to protect the dugong population and reduce impacts on the seagrass meadows.

=== Important Bird Area ===
A 483 km^{2} area of the bay and its surrounds, covering all the habitat types suitable for migratory waders, or shorebirds, has been identified by BirdLife International as an Important Bird Area (IBA) because it supports over 1% of the world populations of pied oystercatchers, Far Eastern curlews and grey-tailed tattlers, and over 1% of the East Asian – Australasian Flyway populations of bar-tailed godwits, Eurasian whimbrels and Terek sandpipers. It also contains populations of beach stone-curlews and mangrove honeyeaters.

== In popular culture ==
- Shoalwater Bay is mentioned in "I Was Only Nineteen", the #1 single by Redgum from the 1983 album Caught in the Act.
- It is also mentioned in the video game ARMA 2, when a USMC private named Kowalski mentions he had a fun time with the "Aussies at Shoalwater Bay".

== See also ==
- Exercise Talisman Saber
- Island Head
- Williamson Airfield—a military airfield located within the Shoalwater Bay Military Training Area
