= Ogh Undjan =

Aboriginal Australian people

The Ngundjan (Ogh-Undjan) were an indigenous Australian people of the state of Queensland.

== Language ==
The Ngundjan spoke a dialect variety of Kunjen.

== Country ==
The Ngundjan had, in Norman Tindale's estimation, some 4,500 square miles (12,000 km^{2}) of tribal territory around the area of the Mitchell River south of the Palmer River junction. Their inland extension went to Dunbar and southwards as far as Emu Creek and the Red River.

== Alternative names ==
- Kun'djan
- Kundjan
- Gundjun
- Koko Kuntjan
- Kundjin
- Kokoyan
- Koonjan
- Kunjen, Kunjin
- Okundjain
- Koko wansin (?) (Note: For others see the Austkin entry on Kunjen.)

== Sources ==
- Doherty, Ralph L. (1 July 1964). "A Review of Recent Studies of Arthropod-Borne Viruses in Queensland". Journal of Medical Entomology. 1 (2): 158–165. doi:10.1093/jmedent/1.2.158.
- Howitt, Alfred William (1904). The native tribes of south-east Australia (PDF). Macmillan.
- "Kunjen". The AustKin project.
- Mathews, R. H. (1899). "Divisions of tribes in the Northern Territory". Proceedings of the Royal Society of New South Wales. 33: 111–114.
- Mathews, R. H. (1900b). "Some tribes of Cape York Peninsula". Proceedings of the Royal Society of New South Wales. 34: 131–135.
- Mathews, R. H. (October–December 1900a). "The Origin, Organization and Ceremonies of the Australian Aborigines". Proceedings of the American Philosophical Society. 39 (164): 556–578. JSTOR 983776.
- Sharp, R. Lauriston (June 1934). "The Social Organization of the Yir-Yoront Tribe, Cape York Peninsula (Part 1. Kinship and the Family". Oceania. 4 (4): 404–431. doi:10.1002/j.1834-4461.1934.tb00120.x. JSTOR 27976162.
- Sharp, R. Lauriston (March 1939a). "Tribes and Totemism in North-East Australia". Oceania. 9 (3): 254–275. doi:10.1002/j.1834-4461.1939.tb00232.x. JSTOR 40327744.
- Sharp, R. Lauriston (June 1939b). "Tribes and Totemism in North-East Australia (Continued)". Oceania. 9 (4): 439–461. doi:10.1002/j.1834-4461.1939.tb00248.x. JSTOR 40327762.
- Sommer, Bruce A.; Sommer, E. G. (1967). Kunjen pronouns and kinship. Vol. 10. Pacific Linguistics Occasional Paper. pp. 53–59.
- Sommer, Bruce A.; Sommer, E. G. (1969). Kunjen phonology. Vol. 11. Pacific Linguistics Monograph. pp. 1–72.
- Sommer, Bruce A. (2006). Speaking Kunjen: An Ethnography of Oykangand Kinship and Communication. Pacific Linguistics. ISBN 978-0-858-83557-3.
- Tindale, Norman Barnett (1974). "Ngundjan (QLD)". Aboriginal Tribes of Australia: Their Terrain, Environmental Controls, Distribution, Limits, and Proper Names. Australian National University Press.
