= Island Head (Queensland) =

Australian island

Coordinates: 22°19′51.08″S 150°39′39.8″E

Island Head is an island off the coast of Central Queensland, Australia.

== Location ==
It is located off the northern tip of a mountainous peninsula on the coast between Yeppoon and St Lawrence.

== Features ==
It has two natural harbours, Port Clinton in the south, and Island Head Creek in the north which is also designated as an important Australian wetland. The western side of the peninsula is Shoalwater Bay, a well known military training area.
