= Philip Frederic Sellheim =

Hessian pastoralist and mining official in Australia

Philip Frederic Sellheim (1832–1899) was a Hessian pastoralist and mining official in Australia in the latter half of the 19th century. He was born on 28 September 1832 at Konradsdorf in the Grand Duchy of Hesse. His parents were Heinrich and Marian Emma Sophia, née Schaefer. He was educated to a level which enabled him to study sheep breeding at the Royal Veterinary Academy of Berlin.

== Early life ==
Sellheim emigrated to Queensland in 1855, and was employed as the manager of Banana station on the Dawson River for four years. He then joined George Dalrymple on an expedition to explore the Burdekin River catchment.

== Pastoralist ==
In 1861 Sellheim and a partner took up Strathmore (near present-day Collinsville) a pastoral lease on which they ran sheep for five years. In 1866 they were forced off the run by the difficulties of pioneering a remote region infested with spear grass. From 1867 to 1870 he managed Valley of Lagoons Station for Walter Jervoise Scott.

== Family ==
Sellheim was naturalized in 1862, and in 1865 he married Laura Theresa Morisset. They had a daughter and two sons, the eldest of whom (Victor) became a major-general.

== Mining official ==
In 1874 Sellheim was appointed warden in charge of the new, remote and turbulent Palmer goldfield. He was successful in this role, and in 1880 was promoted to Charters Towers. In 1888 he was promoted to Gympie. These appointments were during a period where trade unions were developing, and Sellheim was able to maintain good relations between employers and employees. In 1892 he became under-secretary for mines, in which position he remained until his death at New Farm, on 12 October 1899.
