= Victor Sellheim =

Australian military officer

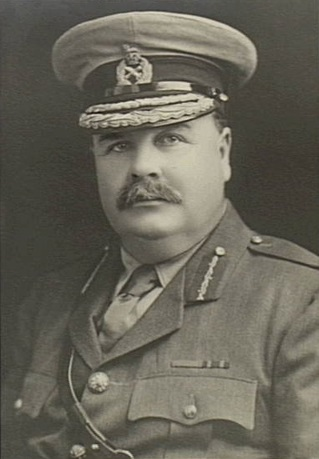
- Brigadier General Victor Sellheim in 1916
- Born: 4 May 1866; Balmain, New South Wales
- Died: 25 January 1928 (aged 61); Norfolk Island
- Burial place: Kingston Cemetery, Kingston, Norfolk Island
- Relatives: Philip Frederic Sellheim (father); James Morisset (grandfather)
- Military career
- Allegiance: Australia
- Branch: Queensland Defence Force; Australian Army
- Service years: c.1886–1927
- Rank: Major General
- Commands: AIF Administrative Headquarters (1915–16)
- Conflicts: Second Boer War; First World War
- Awards: Companion of the Order of the Bath; Companion of the Order of St Michael and St George; Mentioned in Despatches (2)
- Other work: Administrator of Norfolk Island (1927–28)

Major General Victor Conradsdorf Morisset Sellheim, CB, CMG (4 May 1866 – 25 January 1928) was an Australian military officer during the Second Boer War and the First World War. Sellheim fought in the Second Boer War with Chauvel's Mounted Infantry and fought in the Battle of Modder River. For his actions during the war, Sellheim became a Companion of the Order of the Bath. After serving in a variety of staff positions, he became Quartermaster general of the Australian Military Forces in 1912 and two years later was Adjutant general. Between 1914 and 1916 he oversaw the Australian Imperial Force base at Cairo. He became the Adjutant general again. After the end of the First World War, Sellheim became Quartermaster general in 1920 but resigned in 1927 to become Administrator of Norfolk Island, where he died on heart failure in 1928.

== Early life ==
Sellheim was born on 4 May 1866 in Balmain, New South Wales, the eldest son of Philip Frederic Sellheim and his wife Laura Morriset. He was educated at the Brisbane Grammar School and was a surveyor afterwards. Sellheim married Susan Howell-Griffith on 7 December 1890. He enlisted in the Kennedy Regiment, where he received a second lieutenant's commission in 1892 and was promoted to captain the next year. As the regimental adjutant, he obtained a permanent commission in the Queensland Defence Force in 1896.

After attending courses in the United Kingdom, Sellheim served in the Second Boer War as an officer attached to British units and the chief of staff of Harry Chauvel's Mounted Infantry, taking part in the Battle of Belmont and the Battle of Modder River. He later joined the Queensland Mounted Infantry during the advance on Pretoria. For his services during the war, Sellheim was appointed a Companion of the Order of the Bath and also Mentioned in Despatches.

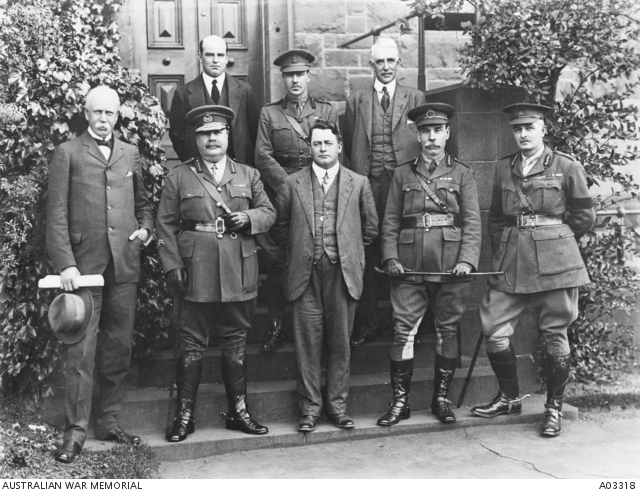
Members of the Australian Army's Military Board, 1914. Sellheim is in the front row, second from the left.

After the Boer War, Sellheim was shifted through various staff appointments and was promoted to lieutenant colonel in December 1909 and appointed the Quartermaster General to the Australian Military Forces in 1912. Promoted to colonel in 1913, he became the Adjutant-General in August 1914.

== First World War ==
Sellheim served as the head of the administrative staff in the 1st Division of the Australian Imperial Force. He did not have a good relationship with his superior, Major General William Bridges and as a result Bridges did not deal directly with Sellheim on administrative matters. Sellheim organised a base for the AIF in Cairo and was promoted to brigadier general in 1916. AIF Administrative Headquarters was moved to England in May. Sellheim was replaced by Robert Anderson in August and was sent back to Australia to become the Adjutant General again. He was again mentioned in despatches and also appointed a Companion of the Order of St Michael and St George.

== Later life ==
Promoted to major general in January 1920, Sellheim became the Quartermaster General as well as the Adjutant General as a result of decreasing defence expenditures due to the end of the First World War. He resigned his positions in January 1927 to become the administrator of Norfolk Island, but died of heart failure on 25 January 1928, and was buried in the cemetery Kingston, Norfolk Island. Sellheim's maternal grandfather, James Morisset, had served as commandant of Norfolk from 1829 to 1834.
