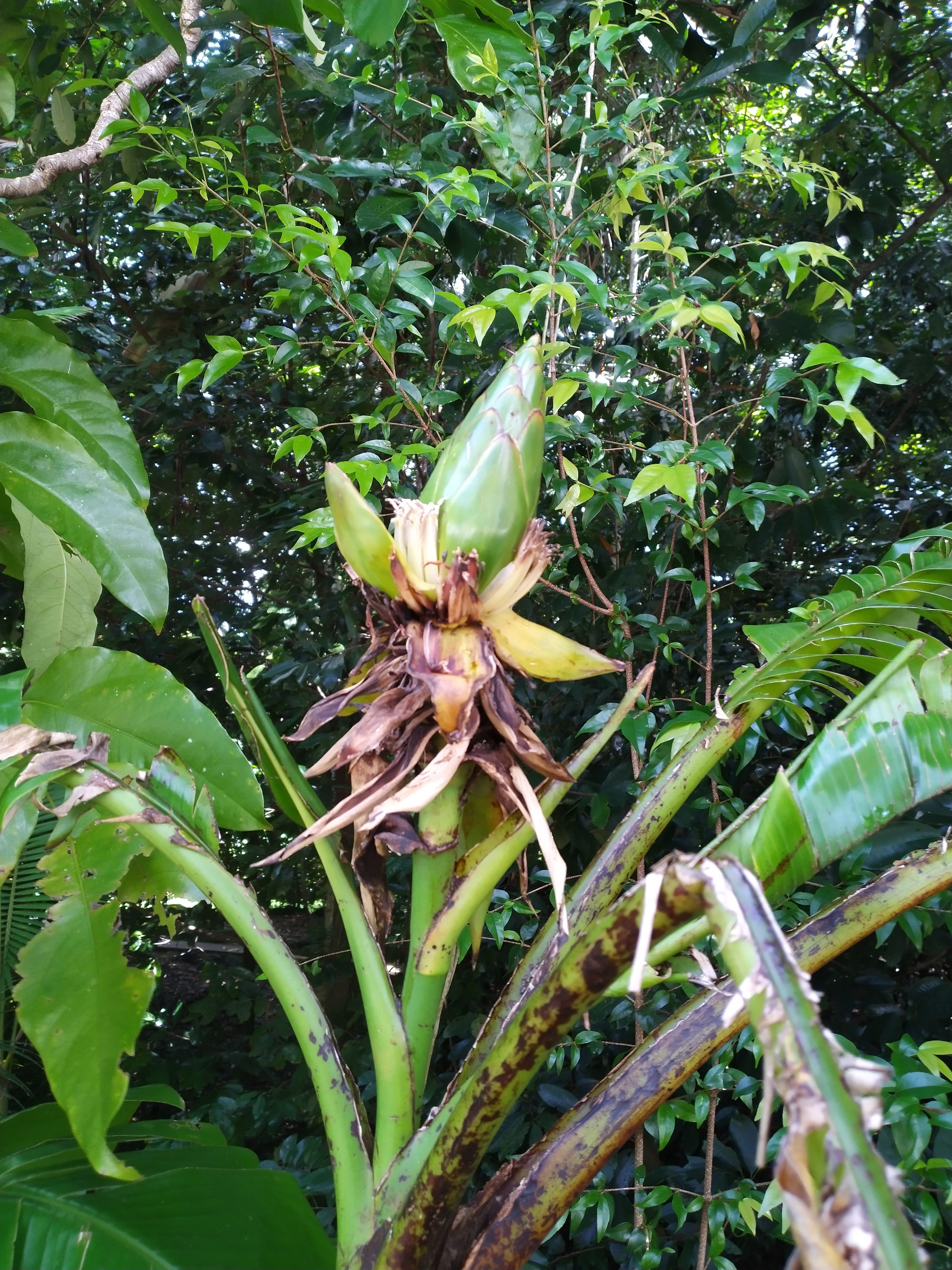
- Flowering at Cairns Botanic Gardens

Conservation status
- Critically Endangered (NCA)
- Endangered (IUCN 3.1)

Scientific classification
- Kingdom: Plantae
- Clade: Tracheophytes
- Clade: Angiosperms
- Clade: Monocots
- Clade: Commelinids
- Order: Zingiberales
- Family: Musaceae
- Genus: Musa
- Species: M. jackeyi

Binomial name
- Musa jackeyi W.Hill
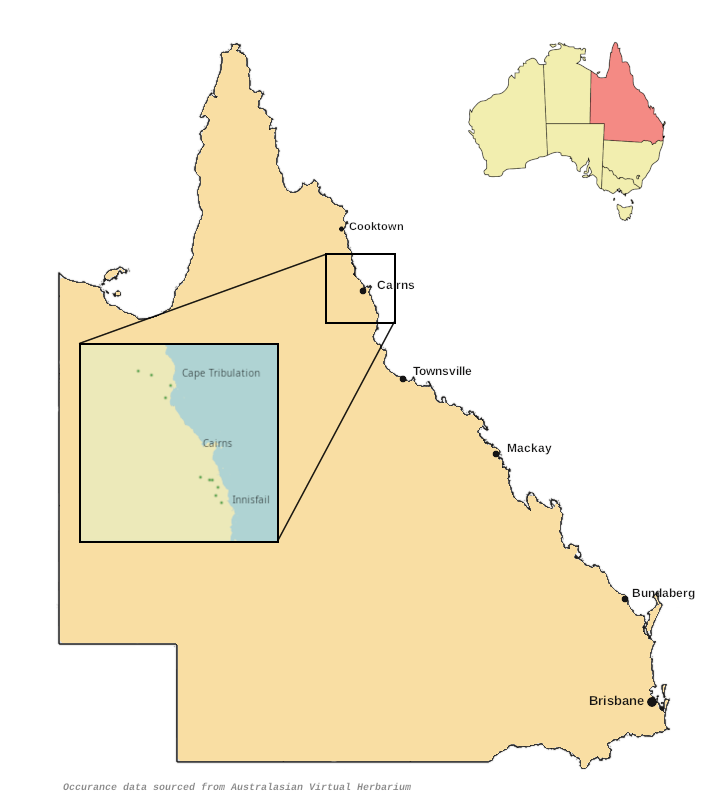

Synonyms
- Musa hillii F.Muell.

= Musa jackeyi =

Species of flowering plant

Musa jackeyi, commonly known as Johnstone River banana or erect banana, is a rare species of plant in the banana family Musaceae. It is restricted to a very small part of the Wet Tropics bioregion of Queensland, Australia, where it has been given the conservation status of critically endangered. It was last seen in the wild in 1995.

== Description ==
=== Stem and leaves ===
Musa jackeyi is a large perennial herb with an underground rhizome. It may reach a height of about 10 m (33 ft) with a dark reddish-brown pseudostem about 45 cm (18 in) diameter. The "stem", like all bananas, is not a true stem but rather it is herbaceous, consisting of successively overlapping leaf sheaths, each wrapped by all the earlier sheaths, thus forming a column-like structure. The leaves are simple, about 2 m (6 ft 7 in) long or longer, 60 cm (24 in) wide, with a petiole (leaf stalk) about 50 cm (20 in) long. There are numerous lateral veins running at 90° to the midrib. The sap of this species is red.

=== Flowers ===
The inflorescence emerges from the top of the pseudostem, and, unlike most other bananas, it grows vertically and the bracts surrounding the flowers are green. It may reach up to 1.5 m (4 ft 11 in) in height. Both male and female/hermaphrodite flowers are about 50 mm (2.0 in) long and 11 mm (0.43 in) wide.

=== Fruit ===
The fruits are berries in botanical terms, about 6.5 cm (2.6 in) long and 4 cm (1.6 in) wide and tightly clustered together. They contain numerous hard black seeds up to 8 mm (0.3 in) diameter.

== Distribution and habitat ==
This species is known from only six locations, three from the area between Bellenden Ker and Innisfail about 80 km (50 mi) south of Cairns, and the other three from near the Daintree River about 85 km (53 mi) north of Cairns. It grows in alluvial soils in disturbed areas of rainforest, from near sea level to about 50 m (160 ft) altitude. Its area of occupancy (Note: For a definition of Area of Occupancy see this page at the Atlas of Living Australia) is estimated at just 24 km^{2} (9.3 sq mi). Little is known about the population trend.

== Conservation Status ==
The most recent observation of Musa jackeyi in the wild was in 1995. It is listed as endangered by the International Union for Conservation of Nature (IUCN), and as critically endangered in the Queensland Government's WildNet database. In support of its assessment the IUCN states that there has been few collections of the species since the 1950's, and that both the spatial and altitudinal ranges of the plant are very limited. They also surmise that the total population is small and add that the population trend is unknown. There is no explanation provided for the WildNet assessment.

As of September 2026, it has not been assessed under the Australian Government's Environment Protection and Biodiversity Conservation Act 1999.

== Taxonomy ==
This species was first described in 1874 by Walter Hill, who was the curator of what was then known as the Brisbane Botanic Garden (now City Botanic Gardens). The description was published in an appendix to his report to the Queensland Parliament about the Garden.

The genus Musa has in the past been divided into a number of sections, initially based on morphology and later on chromosome numbers. By the mid twentieth century there were four sections, namely Musa section Musa, M. sect. Rhodochlamys, M. sect. Callimusa and M. sect. Australimusa, however it was becoming apparent that this arrangement was flawed. In 2001, Carol Wong et al. published a paper describing their inability to place three newly-described species within the existing framework, and in the following year Wong published a new paper reducing the number of sections to just two, sect. Musa and sect. Callimusa. As a result this species was moved from sect. Australimusa to sect. Callimusa.

=== Etymology ===
The generic name Musa was given by Carl Linnaeus in 1753, but its derivation is uncertain. The species epithet jackeyi was chosen to honour Jackey Jackey, the Australian aboriginal companion and guide to explorer Edmund Kennedy.

== Ecology ==
Wild pigs have been observed eating entire plants.

== Gallery ==
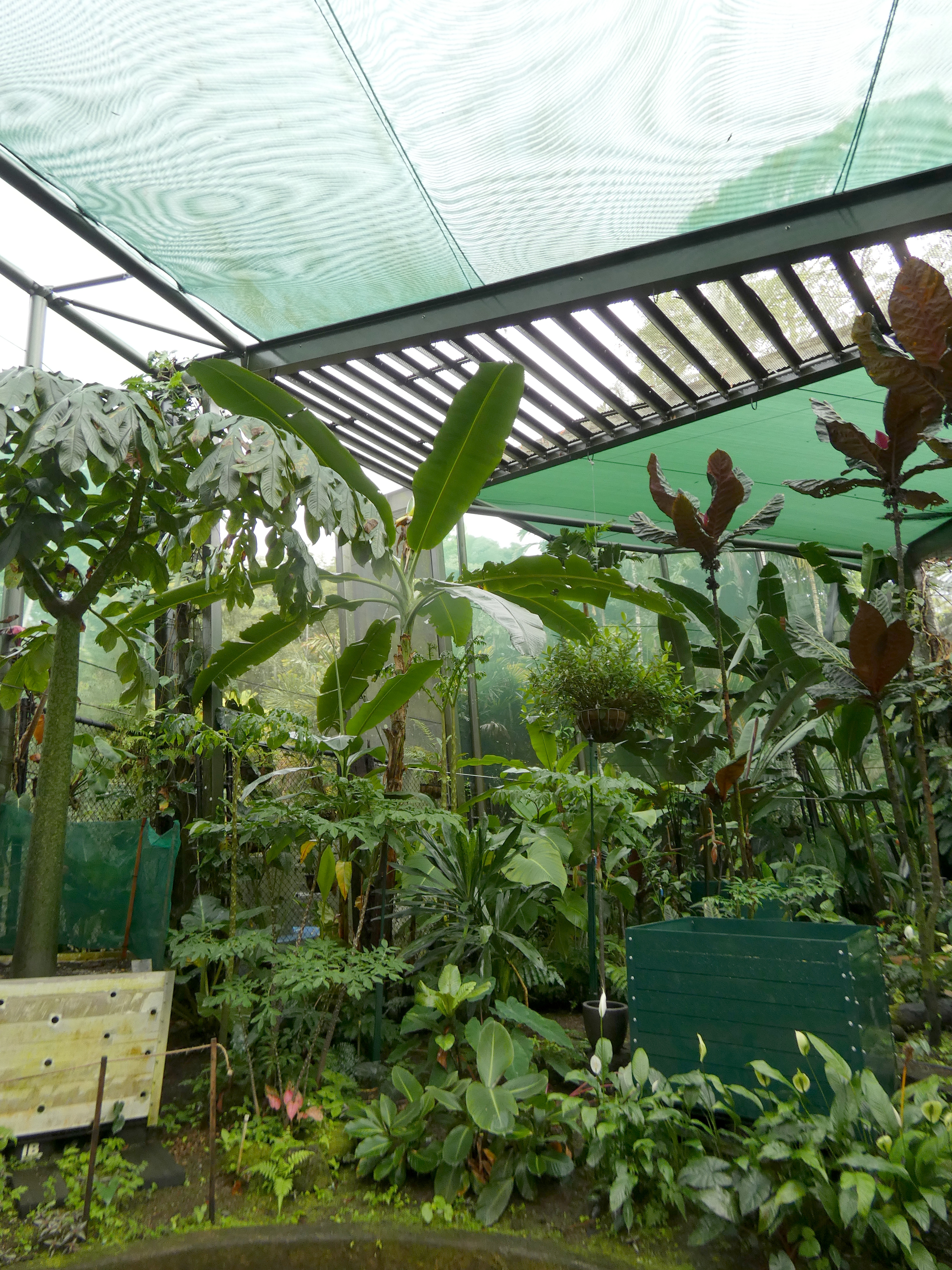
Mature plant flowering at Cairns Botanic Gardens

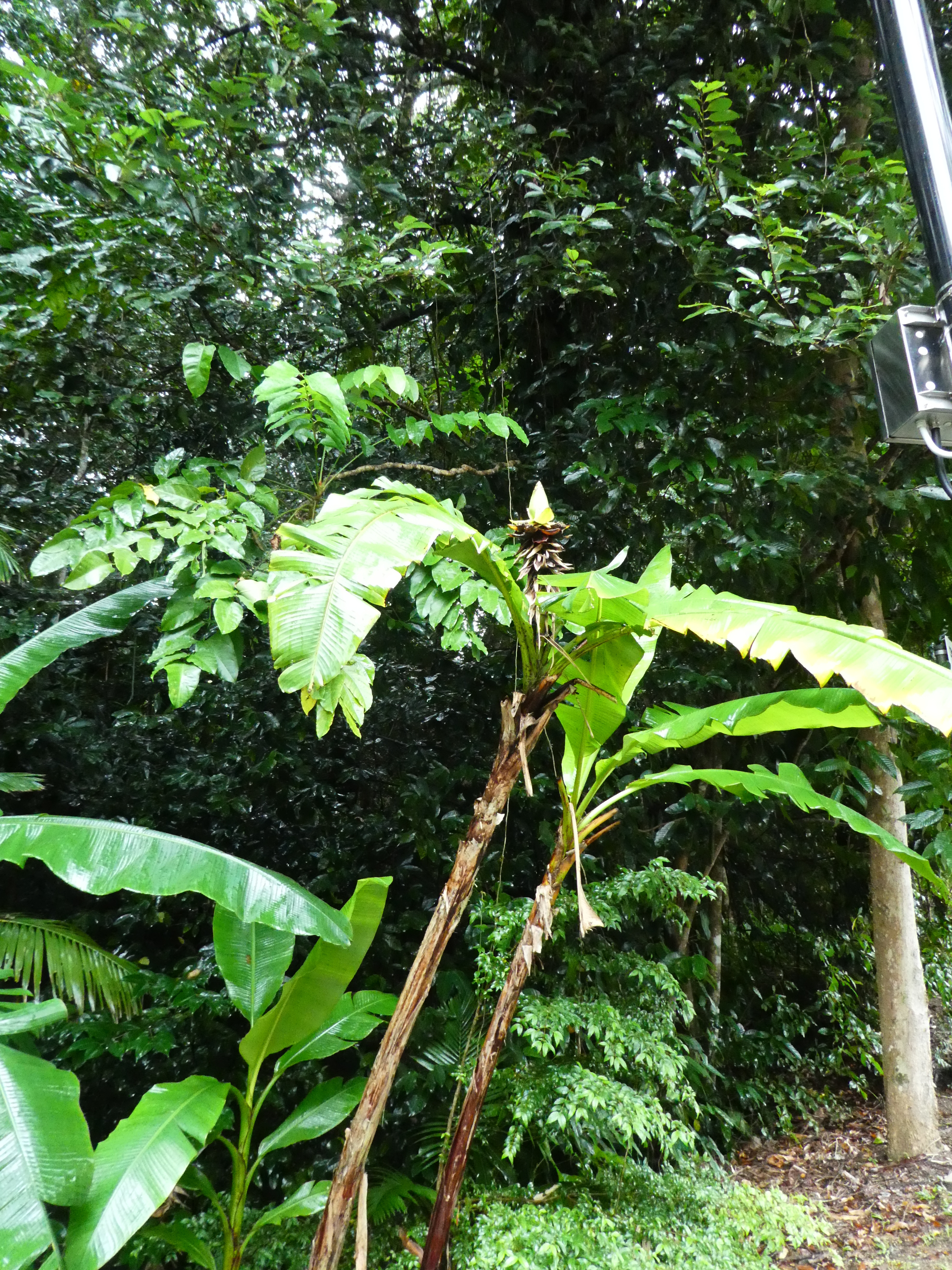

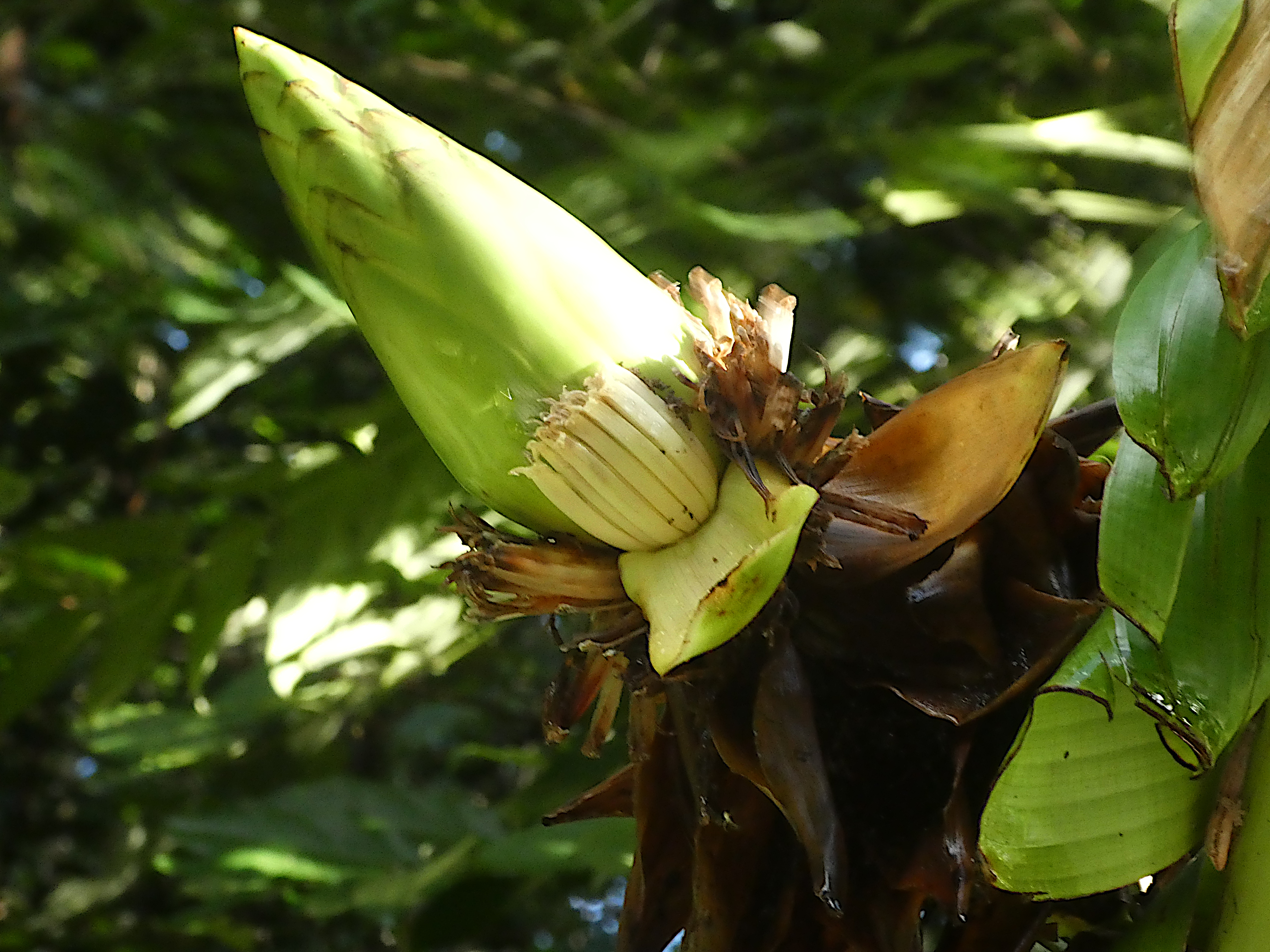
Inflorescence close-up

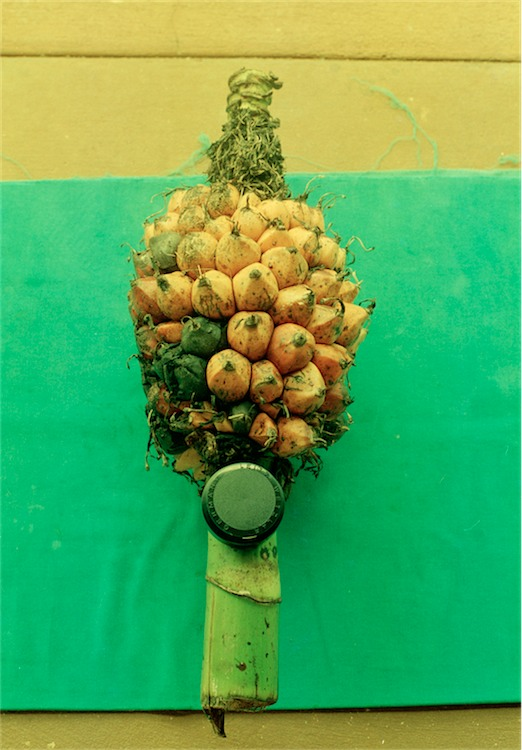
Maturing fruit

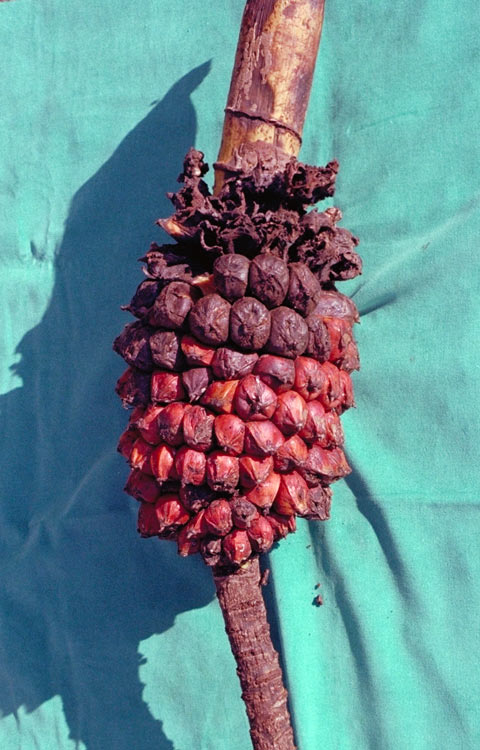
Ripe fruit
