= Walter Jervoise Scott =

Australian politician

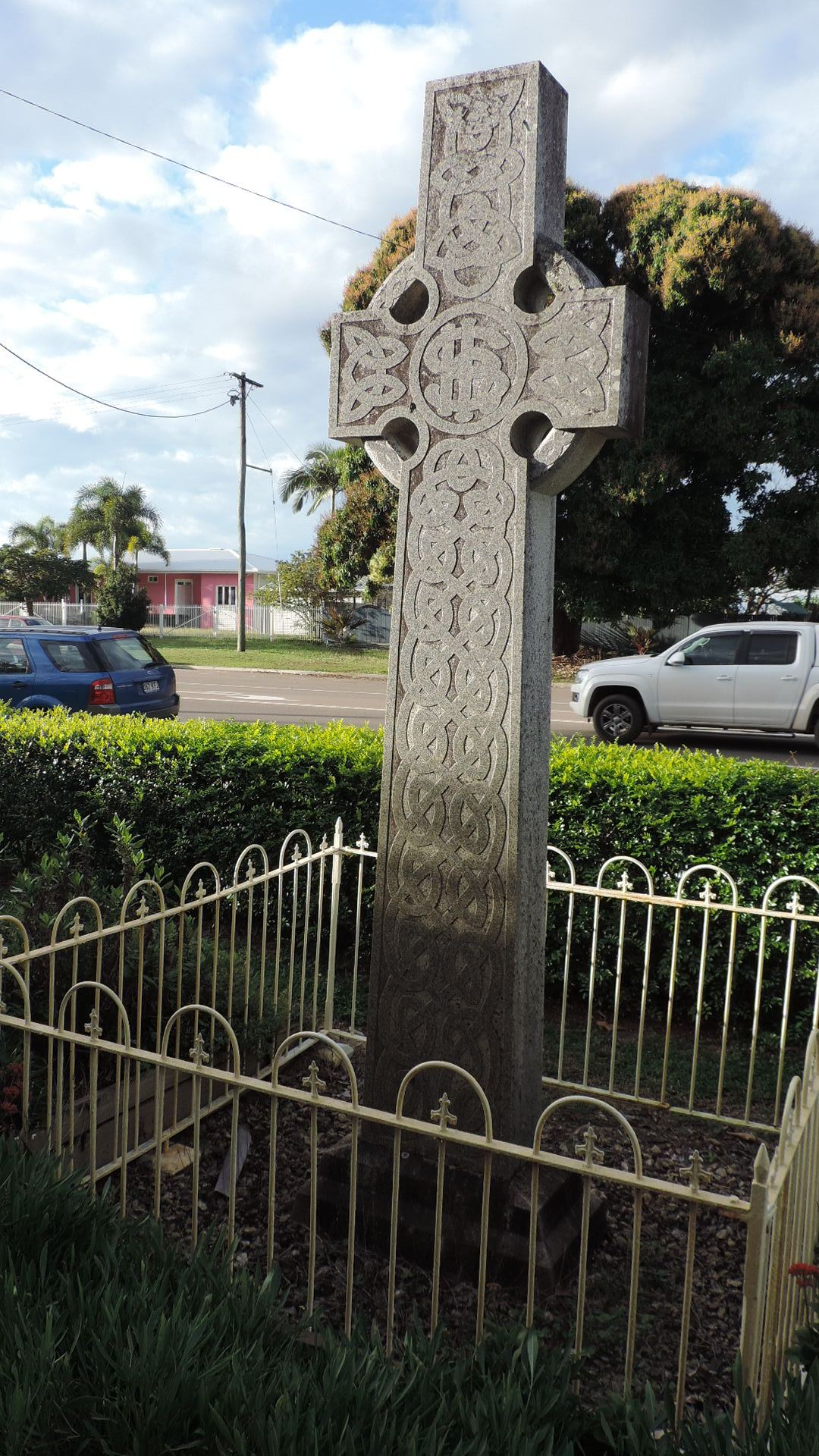
Headstone for Walter Jervoise Scott in front of the Anglican Church, Cardwell, 2016

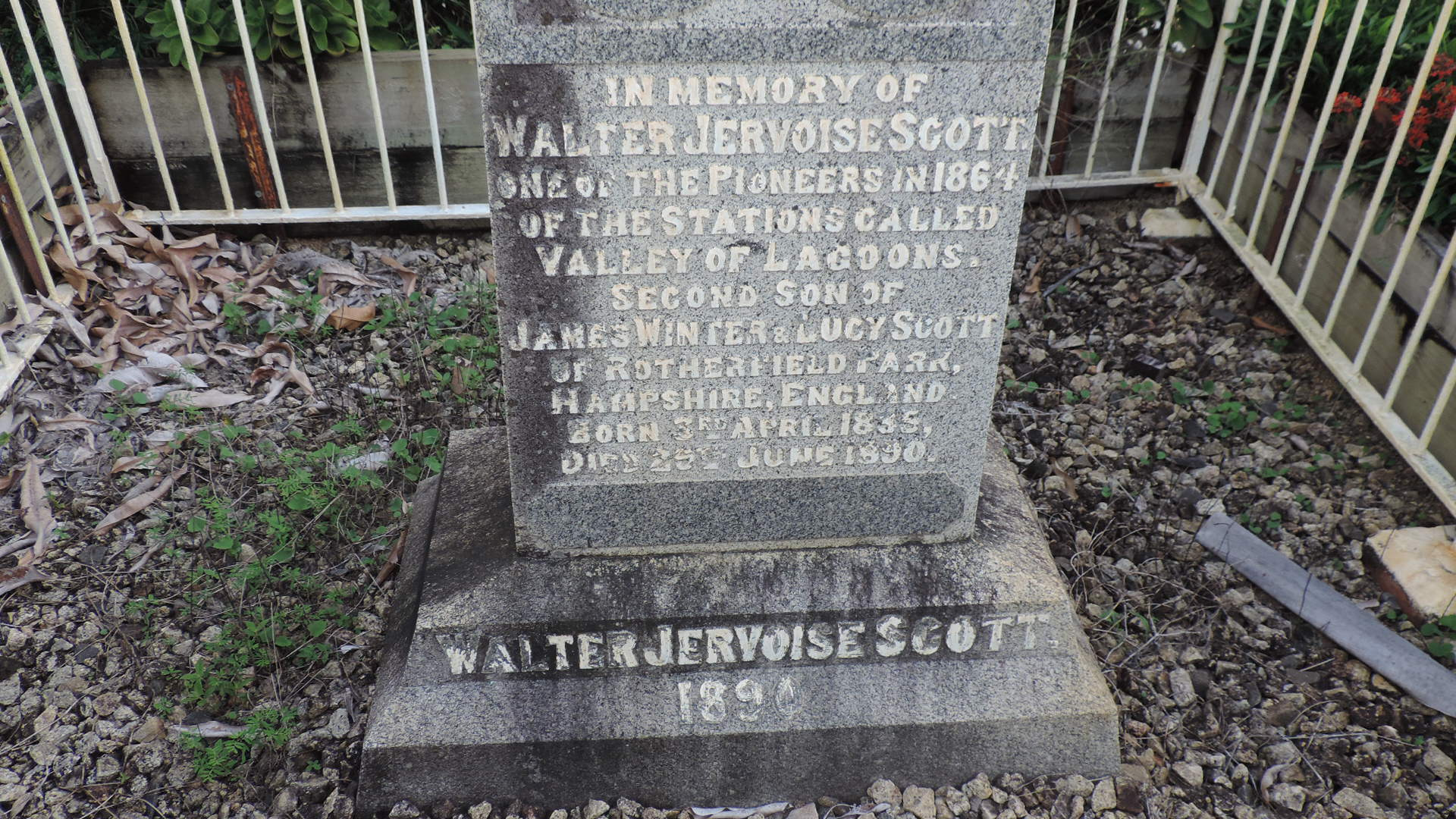
Plaque on the headstone, 2016

Walter Jervoise Scott (1835–1890) was a grazier in Queensland, Australia. He was a pioneer in the Valley of Lagoons.

== Early life ==
Walter Jervoise Scott was born on 3 April 1835, the son of James Winter Scott and his wife Lucy (née Jervoise). Scott was raised and educated in the UK and arrived in Australia in 1863 following stints as private secretary to a governor of Mauritius.

== Valley of Lagoons ==
The Valley of Lagoons Station was established in 1862 after the area was opened up by the government. A partnership formed between Walter Jervoise Scott, his brother Arthur, George Elphinstone Dalrymple and Robert Herbert (then Premier of Queensland) financed the acquisition of the leasehold. The partnership became Scott Bros, Dalrymple & Company with Dalrymple acting as manager. Walter Scott overlanded stock from the Darling Downs to the property shortly afterward.

== Later life ==
Scott died at Valley of Lagoons on 29 June 1890. A large granite monument was sent from Great Britain by his brothers intended for his grave at Valley of Lagoons. On arrival at Cardwell, it was found to be too large to transport up the rough track to Valley of Lagoons, so it was erected in Cardwell instead on land owned by the Scott brothers between Clitheroe Street and Dalrymple Street. In 1914 the family gifted the land with the headstone and five adjoining blocks to the Anglican Church on the condition that they maintained the headstone in perpetuity. In 1965 the church sold the land and in 1966 built a church at 145 Victoria Street (18.2627°S 146.0240°E) and, using a crane, relocated the headstone to the front of the new church.

== Legacy ==
A selection of his papers are held at the National Library of New Zealand.
