= Valley of Lagoons Station =

Pastoral lease in Queensland

Coordinates: 18.67341°S 145.09431°E

Location in Queensland

Valley of Lagoons Station is a pastoral lease that currently operates as a cattle station in the locality of Valley of Lagoons in Queensland, Australia.

It is located approximately 105 kilometres (65 mi) west of Trebonne and 111 kilometres (69 mi) south of Mount Garnet. The property is located at the headwaters of the Burdekin River, which flows through the property. The land is a basaltic plateau covered by an inland flood plain that hosts several large off-channel lakes that provide a permanent aquatic habitat. The area is DIWA listed and is a valuable habitat for fish.

The traditional owners of the area are the Gugu-Badhun people, who travelled widely through the area but made winter camp around the area to make the most of permanent water and abundant food.

Ludwig Leichhardt and his team were the first Europeans to explore the area, on 4 May 1845 on his expedition from Moreton Bay to Port Essington. Leichhardt was very impressed with the area, in regards to rearing livestock.

The property was established in 1862 after the area was opened up by the government. A partnership formed between Walter Jervoise Scott, his brother Arthur, George Elphinstone Dalrymple and Robert Herbert (then Premier of Queensland) financed the acquisition of the leasehold. The partnership became Scott Bros, Dalrymple & Company with Dalrymple acting as manager. Walter Scott overlanded stock from the Darling Downs to the property shortly afterwards. The property was initially stocked with 25,000 sheep and cattle.

Gunnawarra Station was originally an outlying part of Valley of Lagoons until it was taken from the leasehold and taken up as a separate entity in 1865. The 100-square-mile (259 km^{2}) property later acquired another 5,000 acres (2,023 ha) from the Valley of Lagoons lease in 1880. In the same year a shepherd was speared by a group of Aboriginal people on the property and his hut stripped.

By 1896 the station had been acquired by Messrs Fenwick and Rankin, who paid £12,000, a low price for the Scotts who had it stocked with over 20,000 head of cattle and 700 horses, and had invested an estimated £200,000 into the venture.

James Simpson Love acquired the station in 1932; he had also acquired Dunbar and Gainsford Stations at about the same time.

In 1963 Robert Lamont Atkinson acquired the property from the estate of James Love and the property was stocked mostly with Hereford cattle. In 1982 a bushfire burnt out a large area and 600 cattle died from lack of feed. Alan Atkinson sold the 500-square-kilometre (193 sq mi) property stocked with 4,500 head of Droughtmaster cattle in 2001. The property is able to carry up to 6,000 cattle and is renowned for being free of noxious weeds that plague other properties in the area.

== See also ==
- List of ranches and stations
