= The Patriots (TV series) =

Television series

- Ad in The Age 7 Jun 1962
- Genre: Historical drama
- Written by: Philip Grenville Mann
- Directed by: Colin Dean
- Starring: James Condon
- Country of origin: Australia
- Original language: English
- No. of seasons: 1
- No. of episodes: 10

Production
- Running time: 30 mins

Original release
- Network: ABC Television
- Release: 27 May – 29 July 1962

The Patriots is an Australian television drama mini-series. A period-drama, it aired for 10 episodes on ABC in 1962.

This was among a series of period dramas produced by the broadcaster, being preceded by Stormy Petrel (1960) and The Outcasts (1961), and followed by The Hungry Ones (1963). The first two had been written by Rex Rienits but this one was written by Phillip Grenville Mann.

The cast included James Condon as William Charles Wentworth, who gets into trouble while running a newspaper called The Australian (note: no relation to the current newspaper of the same name).

Telerecordings (also known as kinescope recordings) of the episodes are held by National Archives of Australia.

The ABC had broadcast a radio play on this era by Edmund Barclay called Spoiled Darlings.

== Premise ==
William Wentworth runs a newspaper which brings him into conflict with Governor Darling.

== Cast ==
- James Condon as William Charles Wentworth
- Allan Trevor as Governor Ralph Darling
- Nigel Lovell as Dr Robert Wardell
- Beverley Phillips as Sarah Cox
- Beryl Marshall as Elizabeth Cox
- Marion Johns as Mrs Cox
- Ken Goodlet
- Atholl Fleming
- Alastair Duncan as Captain Robert Robison
- Ellis Irving as William Dumraresq, brother of Darling's wife
- Ruth Cracknell
- Barry Creyton
- Richard Davies as Attorney-General Moore
- Stewart Ginn as Private Joseph Sudds
- John Fegan as John O'Toole
- Richard Meikle as W. H. Moore

== Episodes ==
No.	Title	Sydney air date	Melbourne air date
1	Unknown	27 May 1962	10 June 1962
2	Unknown	3 June 1962	17 June 1962
Wentworth becomes involved in a breach of promise suit
3	"The Governor Acts"	10 June 1962	24 June 1962
Wentworth protests against "rubber stamp" governorship
4	Unknown	17 June 1962	2 July 1962
5	"Full scale war"	24 June 1962	9 July 1962
6	"Pistol Duel"	1 July 1962	15 July 1962
A duel is fought between William Dumrareq and Robert Wardell
7	"A Marriage in Sydney"	8 July 1962	22 July 1962
Sarah marries William
8	"A Court Martial"	15 July 1962	29 July 1962
9	Unknown	22 July 1962	5 August 1962
Darling's answer to Wentworth's impeachment is to hold an official inquiry to the death of Private Sudds
10	Unknown	29 July 1962	21 August 1962

== Production ==
In January 1962 the ABC announced it would make a third historical series, an unofficial sequel to Stormy Petrel and The Outcasts. The first two were written by Rex Rienits but this one was written by Phillip Grenville Mann, an Australian who had worked in London and replaced Rienits as drama editor at the ABC. Mann was quoted in the Sydney Morning Herald as saying: "I hope that any factions in it are not dubbed 'goodies' and 'baddies'. "When men of principle disagree it does not necessarily follow that they become either heroes or scoundrels. Tragedy – and drama – can sometimes be found in men who act with absolute integrity and in direct conflict with the needs and desires of the people."

Designer Phil Hickie spent four months designing 17 sets, plus the costumes and props. More than 200 gallons of paint were used.

The series aired in June.

== Reception ==
Nan Musgrove of The Australian Women's Weekly said she "thought "The Patriots" was a wonderful story that could have had added excitement if it had been played at a quicker pace. I wish it had been done in five one-hour episodes." She noted the wide public interest the series attracted.

Stephen Vagg of Filmink argued:

The Patriots doesn’t really have enough material for 300 minutes. The conflict between Darling and Wentworth is really solid, and focusing on the Sudds case would have made a fantastic 90 minute play... But stretched over ten episodes, there’s a lot of padding. Undramatic padding too, with a lot of scenes consisting of characters standing around being indignant about what they are reading in the paper. It even skips some stuff that happened in real life which was cool, such as Wardell meeting a violent death at the hands of escaped convicts.
