= Merley House, Wimborne =

Grade I listed building in Dorset, England

Coordinates: 50°47′04″N 1°59′21″W

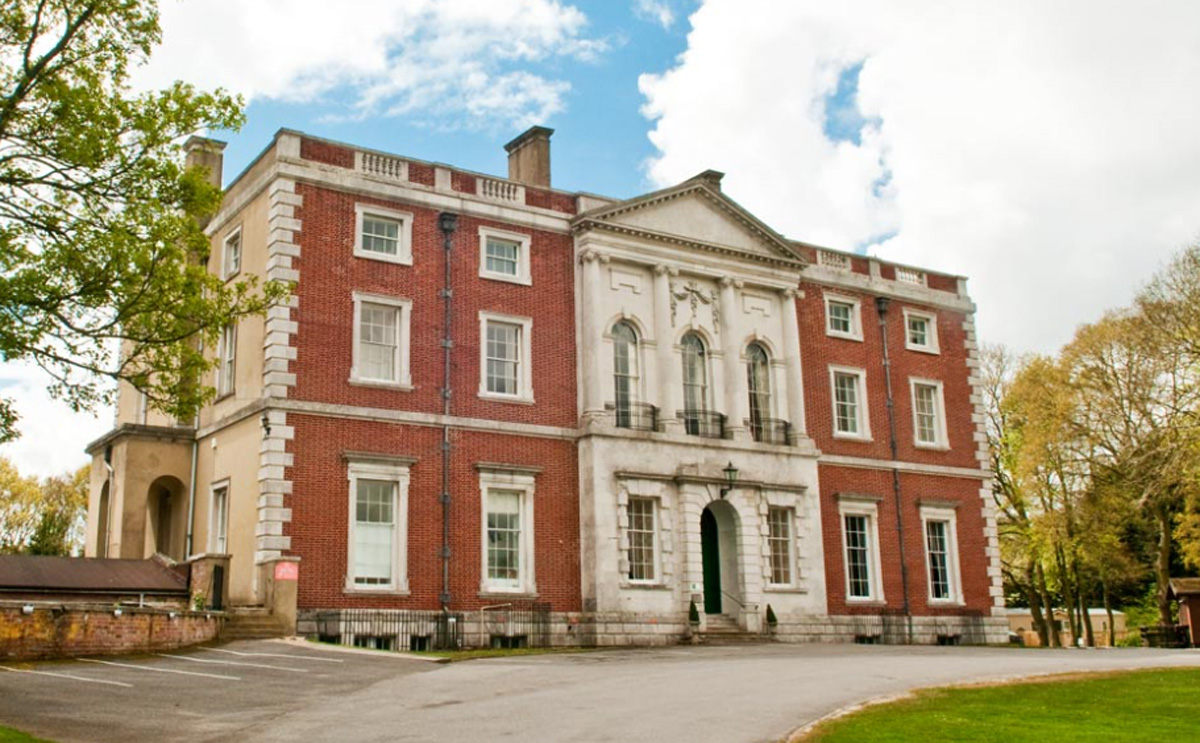
Merley House

Merley House in Ashington, Wimborne, Dorset, England, is a building of historical significance and is Grade I listed on the English Heritage Register. It was built in 1752 by the bibliophile Ralph Willett and remained in the Willett family until about 1875. For the next century it was the residence of many notable people. It is now a hotel.

== Willett family ==
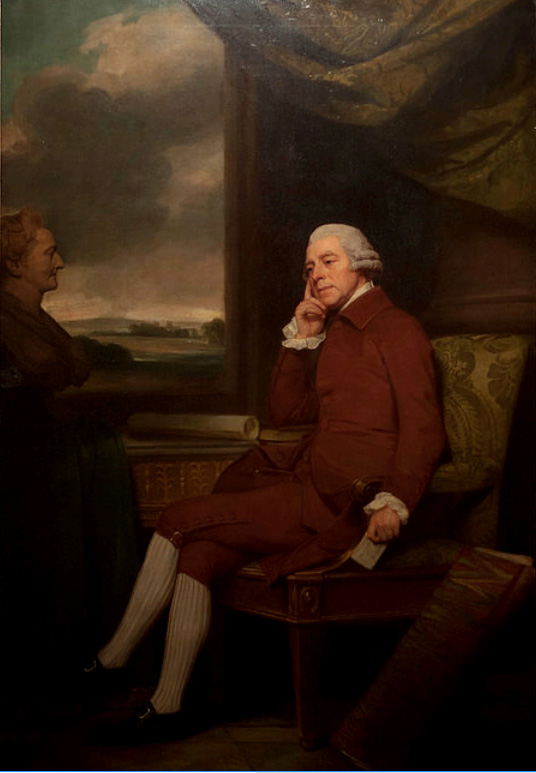
Ralph Willet painted by George Romney

Ralph Willett (1719–1795) bought the Merley Estate in 1751, and a year later started building the house, which was completed in 1760. He had inherited a large fortune at the age of 21, when his father died in 1740, and from then on he was able to gratify his taste for books and pictures. His new house was designed to accommodate his collections, but they became so large that he required more space. In 1772 he built two additional wings, that on the south-east being a library (adorned with designs in arabesques and frescoes) eighty-four feet long, twenty-three wide, and twenty-three high. He also owned a house in Dean Street Soho in London.

He was a patron to several artists. Over several summers he invited the botanical artist Georg Ehret to visit him at Merley house. Here they took walks in the countryside, and Ehret made use of his extensive library. The famous artist George Romney was commissioned to paint four portraits of the Willett family during the 1780s. Three of these are shown.

In 1779, at the age of 60, he married Annabella Robinson, who was the same age. However, she died shortly after the marriage, and in 1786 he married Charlotte, daughter of Mr. Locke of Clerkenwell and widow of Samuel Strutt, who was aged 40. She had three children by her first marriage, but Ralph and Charlotte had no children, so his cousin’s child John Willett Adye (1745–1815), whom he had adopted from infancy, inherited his property when he died in 1795.

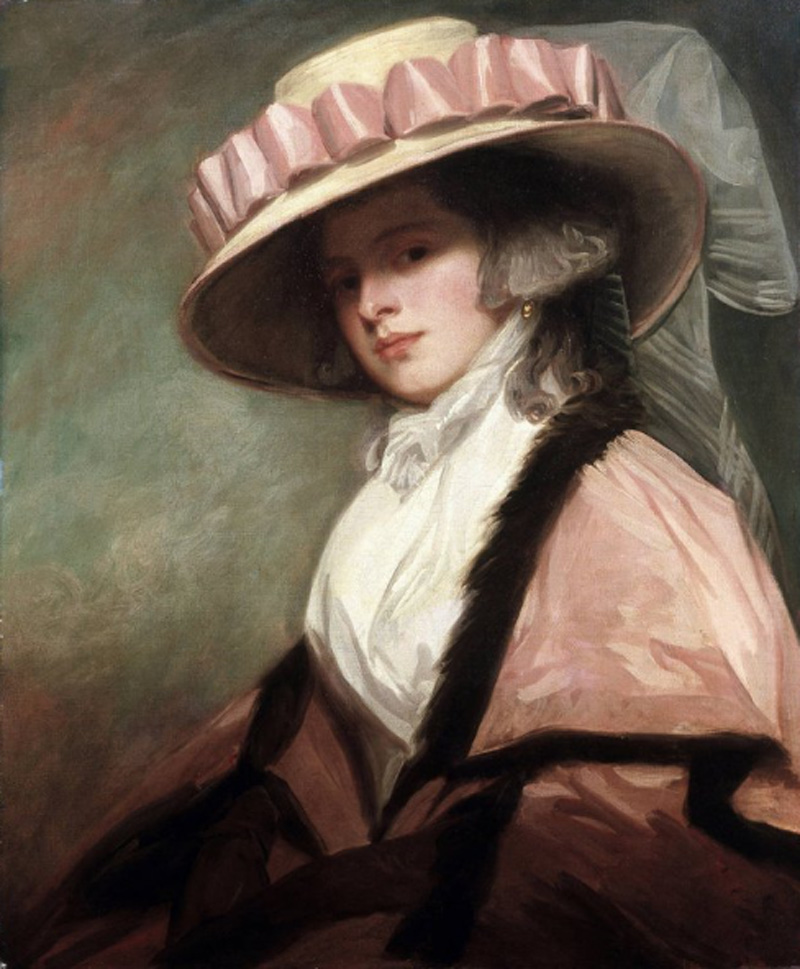
Catherine Willett (nee Brouncker) wife of John Willett Willett painted by George Romney

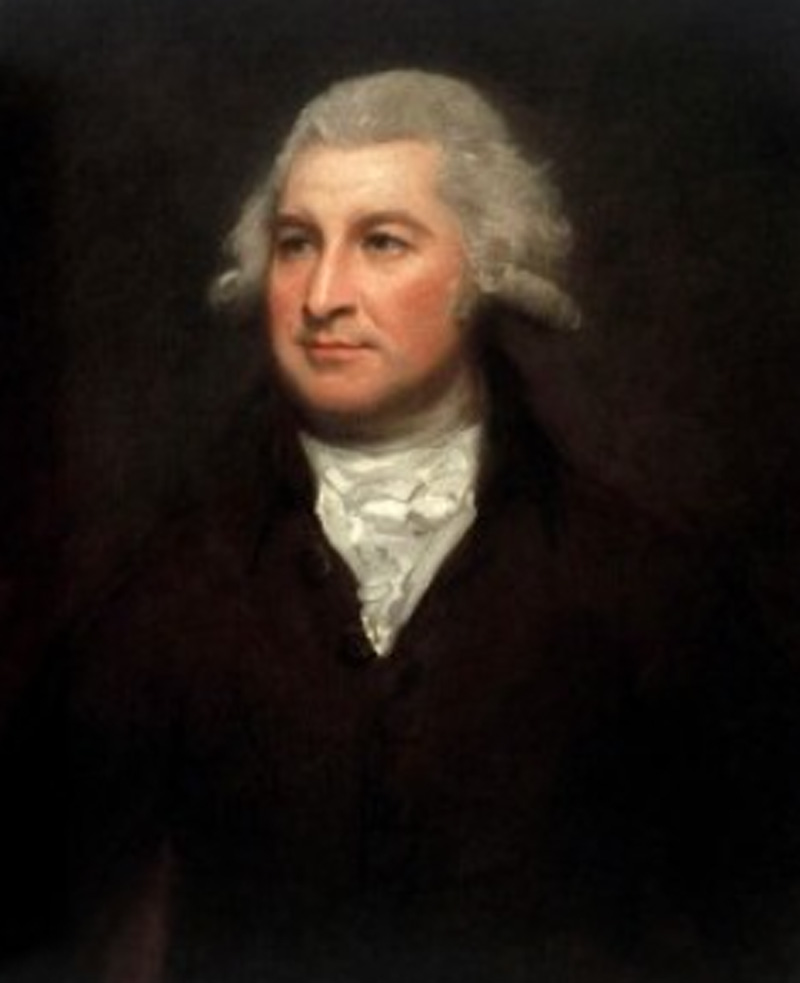
John Willett Willett (formerly Adye) painted by George Romney

John Willett Adye's father was Stephen Adye, and his mother was Clara Payne. He took the name Willett in 1795 when he inherited the estate, becoming John Willett Willet. He became a lawyer and then the Member of Parliament for New Romney.

In 1780 he married Catherine Brouncker, who was the daughter of Henry Brounckner of St Kitts and Boveridge in Dorset. Her portrait by George Romney is shown. Her father died when she was only seven, but he left her a very large inheritance. Her mother remarried John Stanley (1740–1799), who was a British politician and owned a house in Cavendish Square London not far from the Willets' house in Dean Street. The couple had two sons and one daughter.

By 1813 John was in debt, so he decided to sell the large collection of books that were still in the house. The sale was held over 17 days (catalogue is shown here) and raised a large sum of money, enabling him to pay his creditors. He died in 1815, and Catherine moved to London and died in 1798.

The house was inherited by his eldest son, John Willett Willet (1784–1839). However, he had a mental disability, so the property was largely managed by his brother Henry Ralph Willett (1786–1857). It was during this time that the two wings that had been added in 1772 were demolished, as they were no longer needed to accommodate the books and paintings. In 1819 a sale notice appeared in the newspapers for "120,000 bricks, mathematical tiles, a large quantity of Portland stone, cornices pediments and plinths", which were "part of the mansion house at Merley lately taken down".

John did not live at Merley House, and for most of the time it was rented. One of the notable residents during this time was William John Bethell, who was a captain in the 103rd Foot. He died at the house in 1831. He was a personal friend of His Royal Highness Prince William Frederick, 2nd Duke of Gloucester, and in October 1825 the prince came to stay at Merley House. His visit was widely publicised in the newspapers, and the mayor of Poole made special arrangements to celebrate the occasion.

John died in 1839, and Henry Ralph Willett inherited the property. He was educated at Oxford University and became a barrister. He lived in Merley House and collected coins and pictures. His coin collection was sold anonymously at Sotheby's in March 1827. He was particularly fond of the artist William Hogarth and bought many of his paintings. He did not marry, and when he died in 1857, his estate was inherited by his cousin Willett Lawrence Adye.

Willett Lawrence Adye (1818–1878) was born in 1818 in Greece. His father was Major James Pattison Adye. In 1856 he married Elizabeth Marian Ross, and after he inherited Merley House in the following year, they went to live there. The 1861 Census shows that they were at the house with three infant sons and ten servants. They later moved to Puckpool House on the Isle of Wight and rented Merley House to tenants. The most notable tenant was William Charles Wentworth, the famous Australian explorer, author, barrister and landowner, who died there 1872.

In 1875 Adye advertised the house for sale. It was described in the following terms:

It is a very substantial structure of brick and stone facings and strong slated roofs. It contains a handsome suite of reception rooms fitted with costly and elegant chimney pieces, ceilings and embellishments. There are about twenty-five bedchambers. There is good stabling for eighteen horses with coach houses and servants’ rooms, also extensive lawns and pleasure grounds and large walled gardens. The property commands from various points a most extensive and delightful landscape including views of sea over Poole and its harbour and Bournemouth and a considerable amount of the coast westward.

The house was sold in about 1878 and was bought by the Wienholt family

== Residents after 1880 ==
The Wienholt family who bought the house in 1878 consisted of a large number of siblings. It was the residence of two unmarried sisters, Mary and Ellen, with other family members coming to stay. They were all the children of John Birkett Wienholt (1773–1852), who had seven sons and three daughters. Four of the sons—Edward, Arnold, Daniel and Arthur—went to Australia and became wealthy pastoralists. Mary and Ellen seem to have made major renovations to Merley House, as a notice appeared in the newspapers in 1886, saying, "Deans Court has been taken for a year by the Misses Wienholt of Merley House whilst the latter residence is undergoing repair." Mary died in 1896, and in about 1903 Ellen moved to Poole. The house was sold to Ivor Bertie Guest.

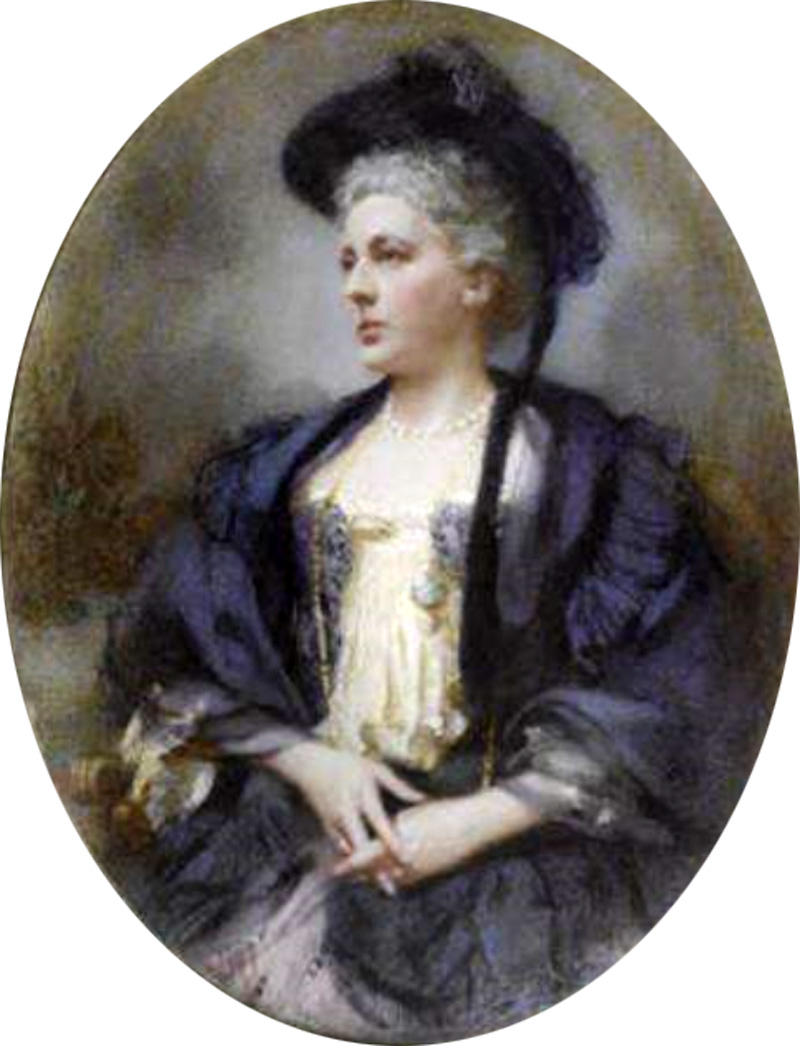
Lady Cornelia Wimborne

Ivor Bertie Guest, 1st Baron Wimborne (1835–1914) lived in Canford House (now Canford School), which was his family’s ancestral home. He bought Merley House primarily as a rental property, with tenants often from the aristocracy. Between 1904 and 1907 Alfred Douglas-Hamilton, 13th Duke of Hamilton and his family were the residents of the house. They were followed by Baron George James Playfair, who remained there until about 1913. Theophilus Basil Percy Levett and his wife Lady Margaret Levett, daughter of Anthony Ashley-Cooper, 8th Earl of Shaftesbury, were the next residents.

In 1914 Lord Wimborne died, and Lady Cornelia Wiborne took over his estates, including Merley House. It continued to be rented out for the next eight years, and then in 1922, when Canford House was sold to become a school, Lady Wimborne moved into Merley House.

Lady Cornelia Wimborne was born Lady Cornelia Henrietta Maria Spencer-Churchill in 1847. Her father was John Winston Spencer-Churchill, 7th Duke of Marlborough. In 1868 she married Ivor Bertie Guest, the future Baron Wimborne. Her nephew was Winston Churchill. In 1915 she led the second Serbian Relief Fund unit to Skoplje. She died at Merley House in 1927, and the property was sold to Angus Hambro.

Angus Valdemar Hambro (1883–1957) was a politician and a notable amateur golfer. He was born in 1883 in Kent. His father was Sir Everard Alexander Hambro, who was a banker and philanthropist. He married twice. His second wife was Vanda Charlton. He had three children by his first wife and four by his second. He lived at Merley house until after World War II and then sold it in 1946. It was bought by the present owners in the 1960s and is now available for events.
