= Ralph Willett =

British book collector and connoisseur

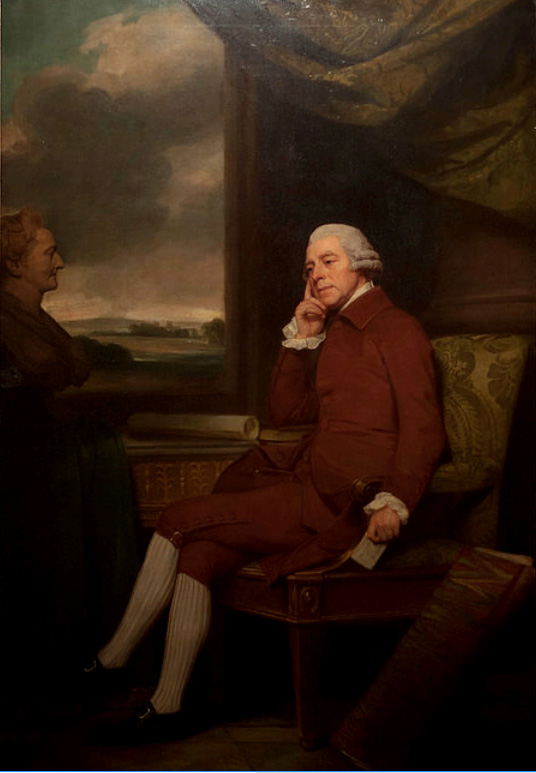
Ralph Willett, portrait by George Romney

Ralph Willett (1719–1795) was a plantation owner on St Kitts and bibliophile.

== Life ==
He was the elder son of Henry Willett of St Kitts, who married c. 1718, Elizabeth, eldest daughter of Colonel John Stanley of Nevis. He matriculated at Oriel College, Oxford, on 23 June 1736, aged 17, but did not take a degree.

Willett was admitted as student at Lincoln's Inn on 4 January 1739. On his father's death in 1740 he inherited the family estates in the West Indies. A 1753 map indicates that he owned five plantations on St Kitts.

In London, Willett had a town house in Dean Street, Soho, and in 1751 he bought the estate of Merley, a manor of Canford Magna, Dorset. There he began in 1752, and finished in 1760, Merley House. In 1772 he built on two wings, the one the south-east being a library (adorned with arabesques and frescoes). A printed account of this room and a view of the house are in John Hutchins's Dorset (2nd edit. iii. 12); views and plans are also in Woolfe and Gandon's continuation of Campbell's Vitruvius Britannicus.

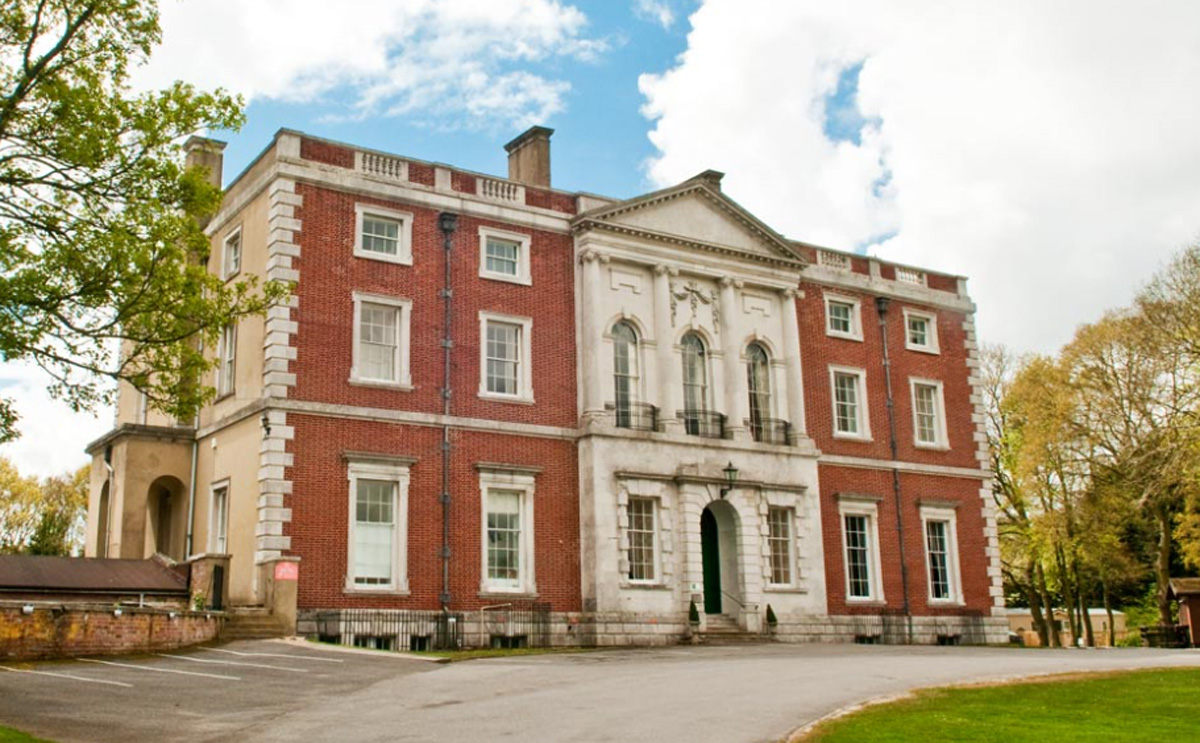
Merley House today

Willett was high sheriff of Dorset in 1760. He was elected Fellow of the Society of Antiquaries of London on 5 December 1763, and Fellow of the Royal Society on 21 June 1764. He died at Merley House without issue on 13 January 1795.

== Collector ==
Willett's library was rich in early-printed books and in specimens of block-printing. It has been characterized as the "finest library in Dorset." Many works were on vellum, and all were in the finest condition. He also collected prints and drawings. His pictures included several from the Orleans Collection and from Roman palaces. A description of the library was printed in octavo, in French and English, in 1776; it was reprinted by John Nichols, with illustrations of the designs, in 1785. A catalogue of the books in the library was distributed by Willett to friends in 1790.

The pictures were sold by Peter Coxe & Co. on 31 May 1813 and two following days. Willett's library was sold by Leigh & Sotheby on 6 December 1813, over 17 days. He had been a patron of Georg Dionysius Ehret who spent the summers of many years at Merley House, its library containing "a copious collection of exotics" by him. The botanical drawings were sold by Leigh & Sotheby on 20 and 21 December. A list of the prices realised at this sale, 19 days in all, was published in 1814, the total being £13,508. 4s. His books of prints passed under the hammer on 20 February 1814.

== Works ==
Observations on the Origin of Printing by Willett were included in Archæologia (viii. 239–50), and reprinted at Newcastle in 1819. As the birthplace of printing, Willett decided on Mainz. A second paper, Memoir on the Origin of Printing was included in the same collection (xi. 267–316), and was reprinted at Newcastle in 1818, and again in 1820. A third paper, On British Naval Architecture,’ also appeared in pp. 154–199 of the eleventh volume of Archæologia.

== Family ==
Willett was twice married. His first wife, Annabella Robinson, died on 10 December 1779, aged 60; a tablet to her memory and that of her husband was placed on the south side of the chancel of Canford Magna church. His second wife, whom he married by special license at his house in Dean Street on 15 May 1786, was Charlotte, daughter of Mr. Locke of Clerkenwell, and widow of Samuel Strutt, assistant clerk of the House of Lords. She died at Dean Street on 11 May 1815, aged 69, and was buried in the south cloister of Westminster Abbey.

Willett's estate and residual fortune passed by his will to his cousin, John Willett Adye, later John Willett Willett, Member of Parliament for New Romney from 1796 to 1806. Henry Ralph Willett, a descendant of John Willett Adye, who died in The Albany, London, in December 1857, collected coins and pictures, including twenty-six paintings and sketches by Hogarth.
