= Saxe Bannister =

Australian politician (1790–1877)

The Honourable Saxe Bannister

1st Attorney-General of New South Wales
- In office 14 April 1824 – 13 October 1826
- Succeeded by: William Moore

Personal details
- Born: 1790 Steyning, Sussex, United Kingdom
- Died: 16 September 1877 (aged 86–87) Thornton Heath, England
- Relatives: Thomas Bannister (brother)

Saxe Bannister (1790 – 16 September 1877) was a writer and the first Attorney-General of New South Wales, Australia.

== Early life and education ==
Bannister was born in Steyning, Sussex, son of John Bannister. He matriculated at The Queen's College, Oxford, in December 1808 and graduated B.A. 1813, M.A. 1815.

== Career ==
Bannister volunteered for active service when Napoleon escaped from Elba. With a captain's commission, he was on his way to Belgium when the Battle of Waterloo ended the war. He retired from the army on half-pay and was called to the Bar at Lincoln's Inn.

=== Attorney-General of New South Wales ===
Bannister was appointed the first attorney-general of New South Wales in March 1823.. On 17 May 1824, he was sworn in at the first sitting of the Supreme Court of New South Wales.

=== Resignation as Attorney-General of New South Wales ===
Soon after his resignation, he fought a "harmless duel" with barrister and newspaper editor, Robert Wardell.

== Death ==
Bannister died at Thornton Heath, England, on 16 September 1877, survived by his wife and a daughter, Mrs Wyndham.

Political offices
New office	Attorney-General; 14 Apr 1824 – 13 Oct 1826	Succeeded by William Moore as acting
