= The Australian (1824 newspaper) =

Former weekly newspaper in Australia

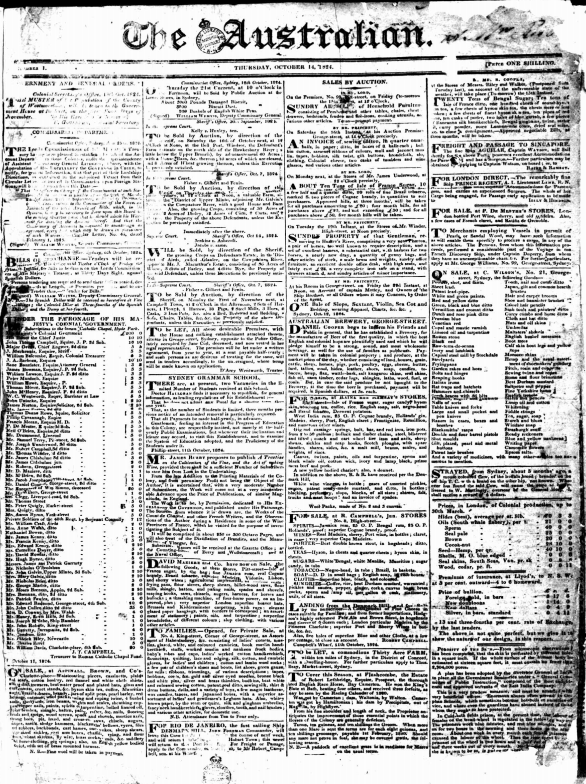
- The first page of The Australian newspaper, Thursday 14 October 1824
- Format: Broadsheet
- Founder(s): Robert Wardell; William Wentworth
- Founded: 14 October 1824
- Ceased publication: 28 September 1848
- Language: English
- City: Sydney
- Country: Australia
- Circulation: 800 (as of 1838)

The Australian was an English-language newspaper published in Sydney, Australia from 1824 until 1848.

It first appeared in 1824 and was the second newspaper to be printed on mainland Australia after The Sydney Gazette (1803). The latter was a semi-official publication containing proclamations, regulations and it was censored by the government.

The Australian was the first independent newspaper in Australia. Governor Brisbane realised there was little point in continuing to censor The Sydney Gazette when The Australian was uncensored and so government censorship of newspapers was abandoned in 1824 and the freedom of the press began in Australia.

== History ==
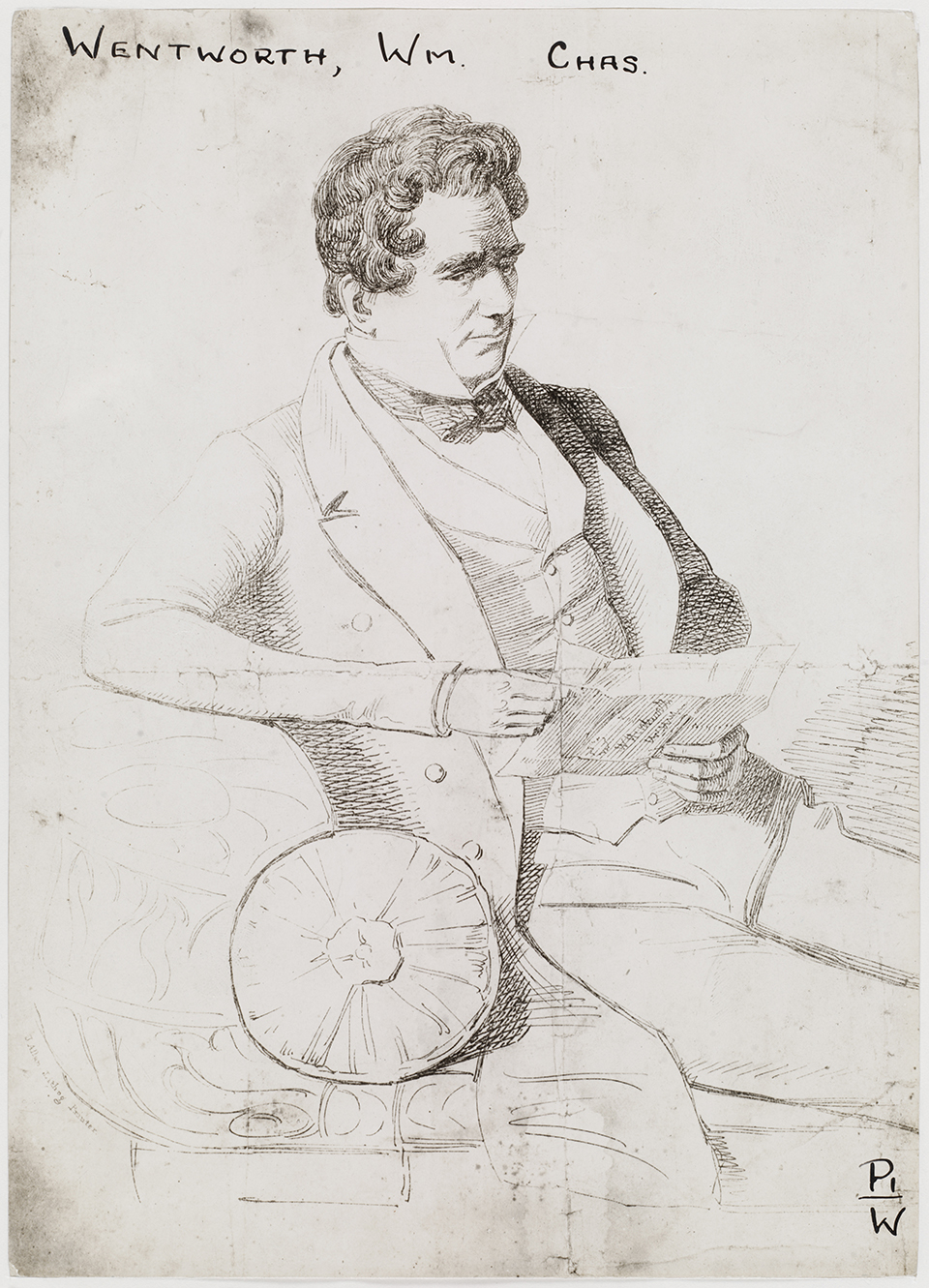
William Wentworth c1848

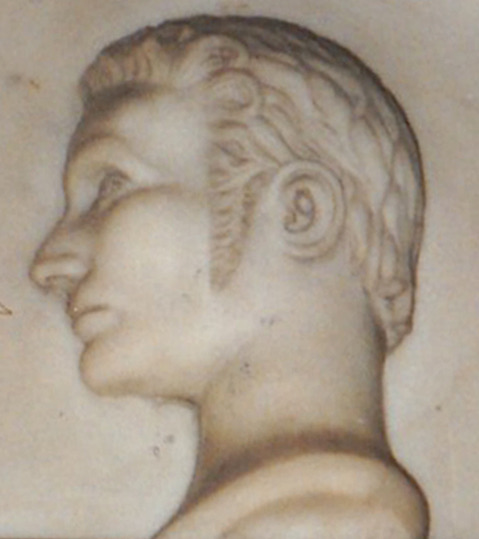
Robert Wardell from memorial tablet in St James Church

=== The early years ===
The first issue of The Australian appeared on Thursday, 14 October 1824. The owners of the newspaper were two lawyers, Robert Wardell and William Wentworth. They had a printing press and other necessary materials with them on the Alfred which arrived at Sydney from Britain in July 1824.

Wardell had previously owned and edited a London evening newspaper, the Statesman. He edited and wrote most of the articles in The Australian and dealt with the day to day running of the paper. Wentworth wrote the occasional editorial and provided £4000 for working capital and running costs. The newspaper championed the Emancipist cause in New South Wales. It pushed for an elected assembly, a low property franchise, trial by jury and for emancipists to be given the right to vote and to sit on juries. It opposed autocracy and sought, "to convert a prison into a colony fit for a freeman." It often expressed liberal views and sometimes opposed the governor.

The only early rival to The Australian was The Sydney Gazette and New South Wales Advertiser, first published on 5 March 1803. It was subject from the start to the censorship of the secretary to the Governor, and later, the Colonial Secretary. In the face of a competitor free of censorship the editor of the gazette approached the governor to request that his publication too should be free of censorship. Governor Brisbane agreed and explained his reasoning in a despatch to Earl Bathurst dated 12 July 1825.

Shortly after the promulgation of the new Charter of Justice for the Colony, a Newspaper was published here, called "The Australian," Edited by Doctor Wardle [sic], a gentleman educated to the Law and who filled a similar situation in London in the Office of one of the Daily Papers, I believe the "Statesman," together with Mr Wentworth, son of the Principal Superintendent of Police. These gentleman never solicited my permission to publish their Paper, and, as the opinion of the Law Officers of the Crown coincided with my own that there existed no power to interpose to prevent it without going to Council, I considered it most expedient to try the experiment of the full latitude of the freedom of the Press, and, to enable Your Lordship to judge how far this Newspaper is conducted With moderation, I have ordered a Copy to be regularly transmitted to you.

The Government Printer, Mr Howe, finding a Paper published without a censorship, soon applied for the removal of that restraint from His Paper, "The Sydney Gazette"; and, as I considered the same opinion applied to both, the censorship was removed; and several months enjoyment of this privilege to the Editor has impressed me with the opinion that the measure has been productive of more benefit than disadvantage to the Public ...

Respecting "The Australian," I shall beg to decline for the present my opinion in regard to its effects.

The Australian took an interest in the economy and provided support for any enterprise that promised to create economic growth and employment. One industry it championed was the whaling trade in New South Wales.

Wool is very well, and so are horses and horned cattle, and skins, and hides, and timber, but for lucrative investment of capital, and Colonial advancement, chose we the SPERM WHALE FISHERY!

The first printer of The Australian was George Williams (c1784-1838). The paper initially appeared weekly, and then, from April 1826, bi-weekly. It appeared three times a week from October 1838. It usually consisted of four broadsheet pages. The occasional supplement, to report an important event, increased its length to six pages. The newspaper was sold for one shilling per copy. In his survey of Australian literature Henry Green notes layout innovations introduced by the paper.

The Australian was a four-page paper with four wide columns on each page, and quite modern in appearance and arrangement by comparison with its predecessors ... the Australian introduced the fashion of printing its leaders and other important matter in larger type.

==== Position on frontier violence ====
In 1826, following violence in the frontier Hunter Valley and particularly following the spearing of a family on a farm property there, Wentworth and Wardell editorialised:

We shall never depart from our opinion, that the system of terror is the only one to be adopted towards them. Conciliation is of no use — at least it never yet has proved of use. Over-seers and stockmen may have been to blame — they may now occasionally offend the tribes. Still there appears to be a dangerous spirit of molestation gaining ground among the native blacks; and we apprehend that vigorous and rigorous movements will prove most humane and most effective. Treat them as an open enemy, and let them have enough of red-coat-and-bullet fare.

Beyond the editorial page, in 1827 Wentworth and Wardell defended Lieutenant Nathaniel Lowe when he was tried for executing an Aboriginal man known as Jackey at Wallis Plains.

=== The later years ===
Wardell was followed as editor and publisher by Atwell Edwin Hayes in 1828 and he was in charge until February 1833. Next came John Richard Hardy (1835-1837). He was followed by George Nichols as editor and co-owner from July 1837 until June 1841. The assistant editor under Nichols was journalist James Martin. Abraham Cohen (1812–1874) was the printer of the newspaper by April 1836 and he became co-owner, in partnership with Nichols, in May 1837. Cohen was the editor, printer and sole owner by September 1838 and he remained in charge until September 1839. Printer George Moss (1809–1854) and the Rev. Wickham M. Hesketh (1807–1868) were the co-owners by June 1841 and they continued as joint owners until their partnership was dissolved in June 1843. Thomas Forster was the printer and publisher for the owners by December 1843. Forster and Edwyn Henry Statham (1811–1887) were joint owners by January 1844. Wealthy pastoralist James Macarthur was a financial backer of the newspaper by the middle of 1843 and as a mortgagee was owed £2,600. Soon after he assumed ownership, Edward Smith Hall (1786–1860) was made editor in April 1846 and he remained until June 1847.

There were hazards to editing a colonial newspaper. Wardell was challenged to a duel by the governor's private secretary over an article that had appeared in The Australian in 1827. In the same year he was sued for libel. The same thing happened to the next editor, Atwell Hayes, who in 1829 was found guilty of criminal libel, fined £100 and sentenced to six months in prison.

The market value of the newspaper as a going concern fluctuated over the years. It was valued at £3,600 when purchased by a consortium of Sydney auctioneers in 1828. But its value had declined to £2,000 by 1843, probably due to the economic depression of the early 1840s.

Its circulation also varied over time. It was reported to average over 600 copies per issue in 1825. But this had fallen to 400 by 1836. By March 1838, circulation had risen to 800 copies per issue.

Sometimes publication had to be suspended due to a shortage of newsprint. Another problem was a shortage of skilled labour. Assigned convicts were used in the print works but they could be unreliable employees. In 1838, the owners placed an advertisement cautioning publicans against supplying liquor to, "any Assigned Servant of this Establishment," and advised that, "Any credit given [would be] at their own risk."

Income from advertisements was fairly steady and easy to collect. But it made up less than half the newspapers income. The bulk came the sale of copies, especially via subscriptions taken out by individuals. This cost 8 shillings per quarter for Sydney residents and ten shillings and sixpence for country subscribers in 1838. Like other Sydney newspapers, The Australian made regular appeals to subscribers to pay their accounts and threatened to take legal action against customers who were in arrears. One reason for non-payment was because delivery could be irregular. The runners who made deliveries sometimes sold papers to people on the street and kept the money for themselves. Extra agents were appointed to collect subscriptions, reduce bad debts and increase circulation. There were three agents outside Sydney in 1836, at Parramatta, Campbell Town and Maitland. This number had increased to thirteen by June 1838, and included one agent in the Port Phillip District (Victoria). The additional agents helped to double the circulation of the newspaper. But subscribers were still slow to pay, particularly in rural areas, and the newspaper was owed almost £3,000 in unpaid subscriptions by August 1838.

The last issue of the paper appeared on Thursday 28 September 1848. Publication ceased due to, "the large amount of unpaid subscriptions, which we are unable to collect without proceeding to compulsory measures".

== Legacy ==
The Australian was the first independent newspaper in the colonies and as such it was pivotal in helping to establish the freedom of the press in Australia. It created a new forum for the free discussion of constitutional and political issues that had been lacking before. In particular it gave a voice to the disenfranchised, emancipists, convicts and others on fringes in colonial society. It supported economic growth and encouraged new enterprises likely to create jobs and income.

It created a forum where the government could be called to account. It is also credited with helping to curb some of the worst excesses of the penal system. One contemporary who commented on flogging and other harsh punishments administered to convicts under sentence in New South Wales went on to say,

But the system is not now so bad as it used to be. Since Dr Wardell and young Mr Wentworth came out, and began to look after the government and the magistrates, there are not such dreadful doings as there used to be in former times.

The newspaper provided a showcase for early Australian literature. Local writers who were first published in its pages include Henry Halloran, Charles Harpur and Richard Howitt. Many readers also first became aware of the books of British authors, such as Charles Dickens, when they were discussed in the pages of The Australian.

The digitisation of the colonial newspaper continues to provides a detailed source of information on social, political, economic and cultural activities in the colony of New South Wales.

Wentworth and The Australian were honoured in 1974 on the 150th anniversary of its founding. The paper was honoured again in 2024 on the 200th anniversary of the free press in Australia.

=== Digitisation ===
The entire run of the newspaper has been digitised as part of the Australian Newspapers Digitisation Program, a project of the National Library of Australia in cooperation with the State Library of New South Wales.

== See also ==
- List of newspapers in Australia
- List of newspapers in New South Wales
