= William Wentworth =

Australian statesman, writer and explorer

The Honourable William Wentworth
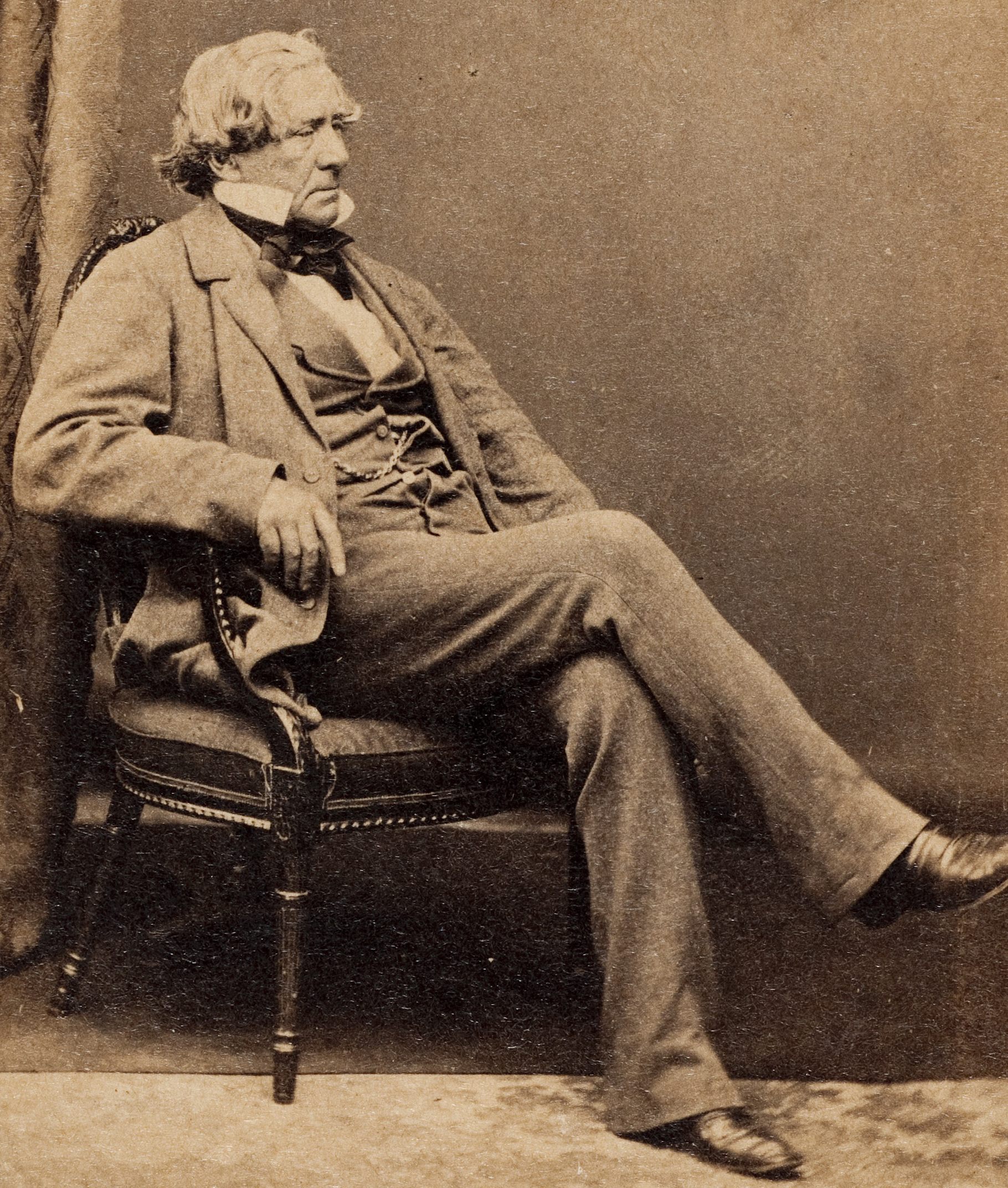
- William Charles Wentworth, 1861–1862, Dalton's Royal Photographic Gallery

4th President of the New South Wales Legislative Council
- In office 24 June 1861 – 10 October 1862
- Deputy: George Allen
- Preceded by: William Westbrooke Burton
- Succeeded by: Terence Aubrey Murray

Member of the New South Wales Legislative Council
- In office 3 September 1861 – 10 October 1862; Life appointment
- In office 1 June 1843 – 1 April 1854
- Preceded by: Position established
- Succeeded by: Henry Parkes
- Constituency: City of Sydney

Personal details
- Born: William Charles Wentworth; August 1790 Aboard HMS Surprize, Cascade Bay, Norfolk Island
- Died: 20 March 1872 (aged 81) Merley House, Wimborne, Dorset, England
- Resting place: Wentworth Mausoleum, Chapel Road, Vaucluse, New South Wales
- Spouse: Sarah Cox
- Children: 10
- Parents: D'Arcy Wentworth (father); Catherine Crowley (mother)
- Education: Barrister-at-law
- Alma mater: Peterhouse, Cambridge; Middle Temple

William Charles Wentworth (August 1790 – 20 March 1872) was an Australian statesman, author, explorer, lawyer, newspaper editor and pastoralist, who became one of the wealthiest and most powerful figures in colonial New South Wales. He was among the first colonists to articulate a nascent Australian identity.

Wentworth was the leading advocate for the rights of emancipists, trial by jury and representative self-government. The establishment of Australia's first independent newspaper by Wentworth and Robert Wardell led to the introduction of press freedom in Australia. A proponent of secular and universal education, he participated in the creation of the state education system and legislated to establish Australia's first university, the University of Sydney. During the 1840s, Wentworth ended his previous support for free-settler migration and expressed more restrictive views on voting rights, though he later reversed course on both. He led the drafting of New South Wales' first self-governing constitution establishing the Parliament of New South Wales, Australia's first. Wentworth consistently advocated for Australian nationhood both in Australia and Britain, and gained credit from Sir Henry Parkes for his advocacy of self-government. A key figure in Australian and New South Wales history, he is widely commemorated.

Before his career advancing these causes, Wentworth, Gregory Blaxland and William Lawson led the 1813 expedition across the Blue Mountains, the first successful British traversal of the region.

== Birth ==
William Charles Wentworth was born on the HMS Surprize off the coast of Norfolk Island in August 1790, to D'Arcy Wentworth and Catherine Crowley. Catherine was a convict while his father, D'Arcy, was a member of the aristocratic Anglo-Irish Wentworth family, who had avoided prosecution for highway robbery by accepting the position of assistant surgeon in the colony of New South Wales.

Due to his mother being a felon and his conception being out of wedlock, confusion has existed around the exact date of William's birth. His father, however, acknowledged him as a legitimate son and he became a part of colonial society as a Wentworth family member.

== Early life ==
William Crowley, as he was then known, commenced his formal education at the age of five on Norfolk Island, "a woman of good character" being his teacher. As a young boy, he moved from Norfolk Island to Sydney with his parents and younger brothers in 1796. The family lived at Parramatta, where his father became a prosperous landowner. His mother died in 1800. In 1803, William and his brothers Dorset and Matthew were sent to England to be educated at an exclusive school run by Alexander Crombie in Greenwich.

Wentworth failed to gain entry into both the East India Company College and the Royal Military Academy. With his career prospects blunted, he returned to Sydney in 1810. He rode his father's horse Gig to victory at Hyde Park in the first official horse races on Australian soil.

In 1811, Wentworth was appointed acting Provost Marshal by Governor Lachlan Macquarie, and given a grant of 1,750 acres (710 ha) of prime land along the Nepean River which he named Vermont.

== Crossing the Blue Mountains ==
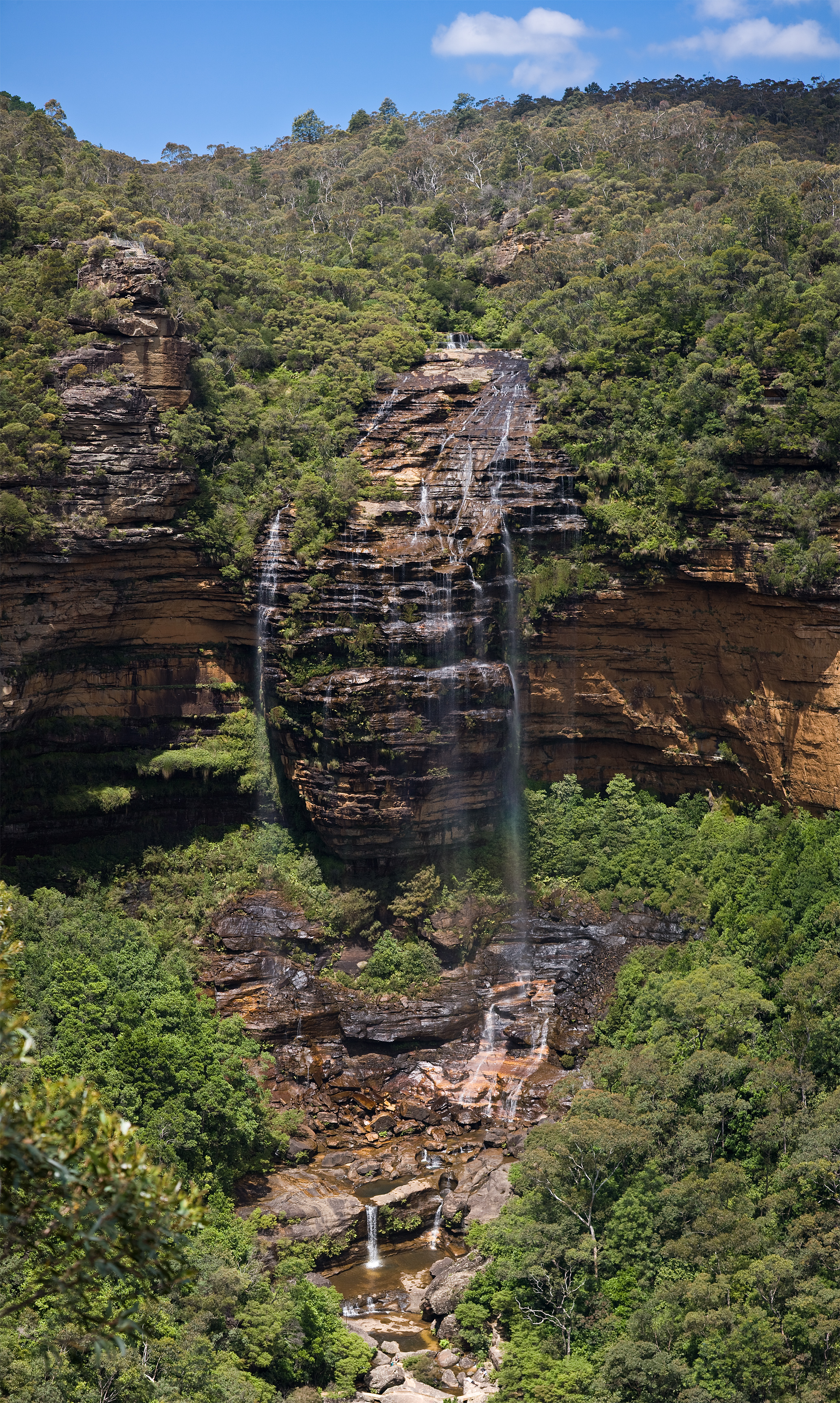
Wentworth Falls, Blue Mountains

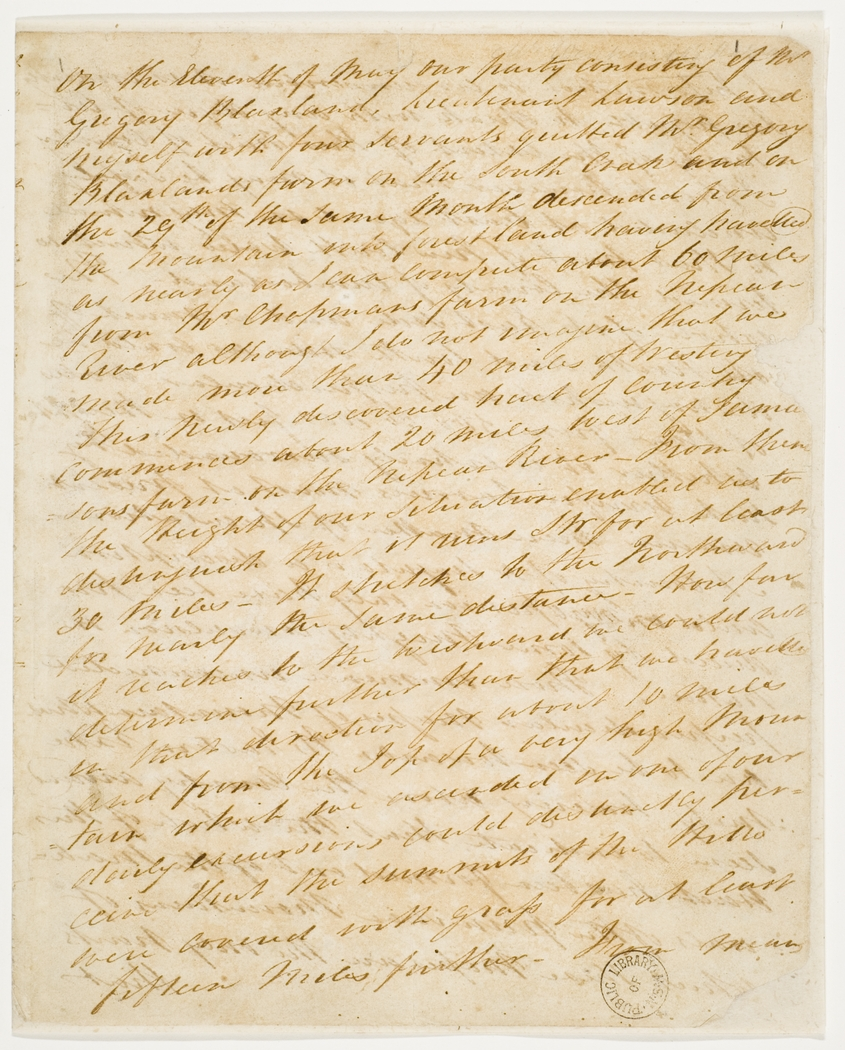
Wentworth's journal of the expedition

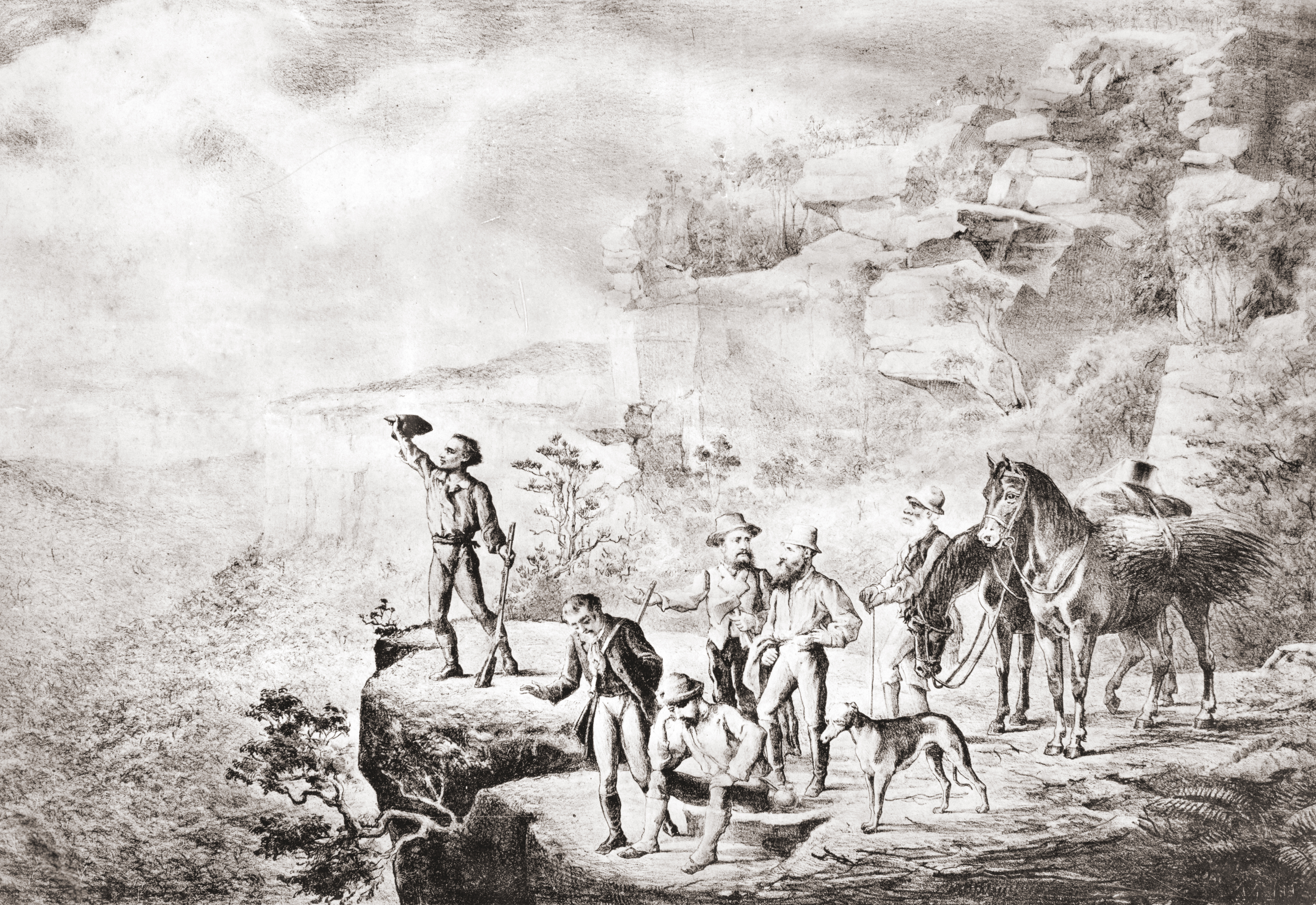
Earliest pictorial representation of the crossing from The Sydney Mail, 25 December 1880

In 1813, Wentworth, along with Gregory Blaxland and William Lawson, led the expedition which found a route across the Blue Mountains west of Sydney and opened up the grazing lands of inland New South Wales. Wentworth kept a journal of the exploration which begins by describing the first day of the journey:

On the Eleventh of May our party consisting of Mr. Gregory Blaxland, Lieutenant Lawson and Myself with four servants quitted Mr. Gregory Blaxland's farm on the South Creek and on the 29th of the June Month descended from the Mountain into forest land having travelled as nearly as I can compute about 60 Miles.

In the journal, Wentworth describes the landscapes they were exploring:

A country of so singular a description could in my opinion only have been produced by some Mighty convulsion in Nature.

In his 1823 epic Australasia, Wentworth once again references what he saw on the expedition:

Hail mighty ridge! That from thy azure brow
Survey'st these fertile plains, that stretch below

The town of Wentworth Falls in the Blue Mountains commemorates his role in the expedition. As a reward he was granted 1,000 acres (4.0 km^{2}).

In 1814, Wentworth continued his adventurous lifestyle by joining a sandalwood-getting voyage to the South Pacific aboard the Cumberland under Captain Philip Goodenough. This vessel reached Rarotonga, where conflict with the local people resulted in five of the crew being killed. Wentworth himself was nearly killed, but with the aid of a pistol, he was able to flee to the Cumberland which sailed back to Sydney.

== Studying in England ==
Wentworth returned to England in 1816, where he studied law at the Magdalene and Peterhouse colleges at Cambridge University. He became a barrister and was admitted to the bar in 1822.

In between studying and writing, Wentworth also travelled to Europe, spending much of his time in Paris. He formulated an idea of establishing himself as a leader of a pastoral aristocracy in New South Wales and attempted to arrange his marriage with Elizabeth Macarthur, the daughter of the highly influential colonist John Macarthur. Wentworth however failed in this attempt after arguing with the Macarthur patriarch over his convict heritage and a loan.

=== Writings ===
Wentworth became involved in literary pursuits, and by 1824 had published a number of notable works. He had created a minor stir in 1816 by anonymously publishing a satirical verse attacking the Lieutenant-Governor of New South Wales, George Molle. In 1819, he published a book entitled A Statistical, Historical, and Political Description of the Colony of New South Wales and Its Dependent Settlements in Van Diemen's Land. In this book, Wentworth advocated for an elected assembly for New South Wales, free press, trial by jury and settlement of Australia by free emigrants rather than convicts. It served as the source material for the first theatrical play set in Van Diemen's Land (modern-day Tasmania), the bushranging melodrama Michael Howe the Terror! of Van Diemen's Land, which premiered in London in 1821.

In 1823, he also published an epic poem Australasia, the first book of verse by a native-born Australian poet, which contains the lines:

And, O Britannia!... may this—thy last-born infant—then arise,
To glad thy heart, and greet thy parent eyes;
And Australasia float, with flag unfurl'd,
A new Britannia in another world!

As well as describing the scenery Wentworth saw in the Blue Mountains, the poem featured a romanticised portrayal of the lifestyle of Aboriginal Australians.

== Influential colonist in New South Wales ==
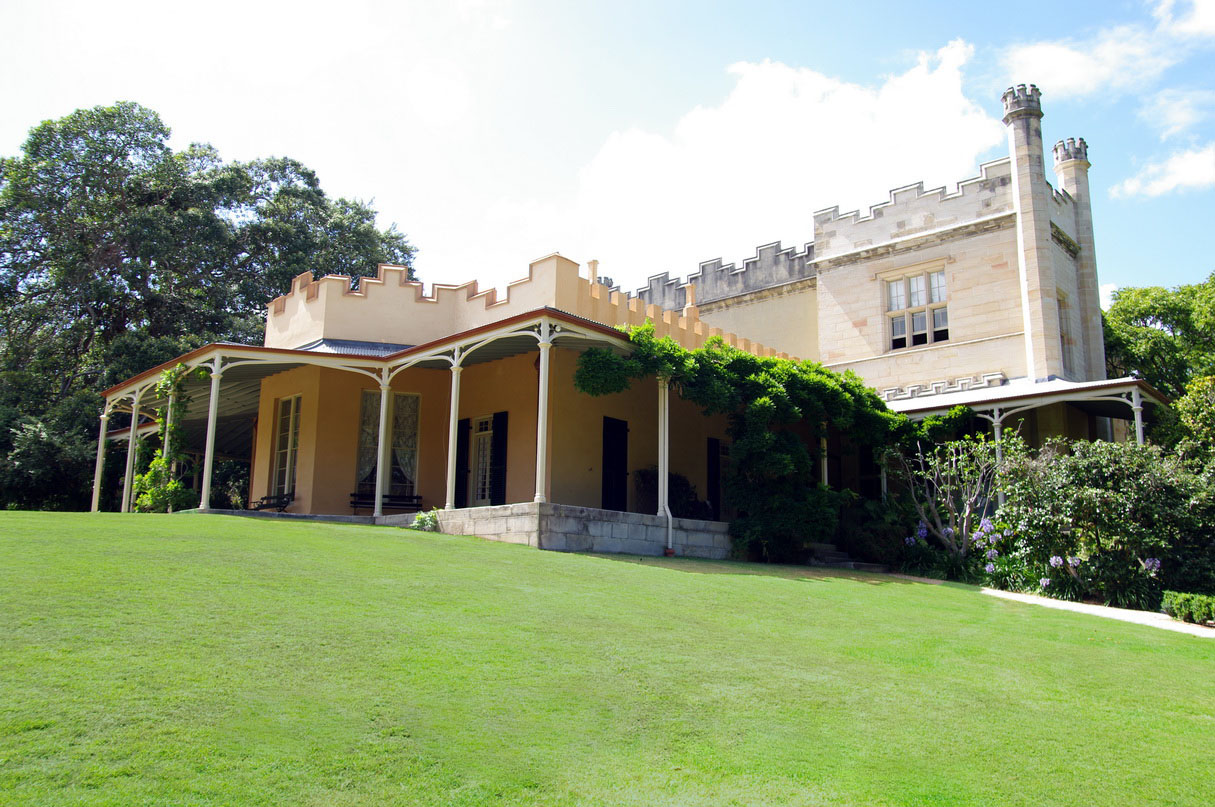
Vaucluse House, built in 1803, was purchased and redeveloped by Wentworth in 1827 during his editorship of The Australian

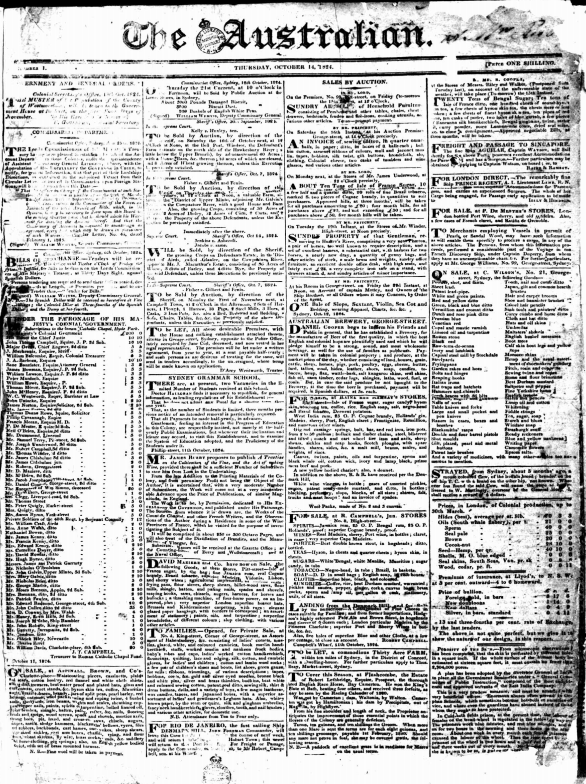
The Australian, 14 October 1824

=== Advocate for reform ===
Wentworth returned to Sydney in 1824, accompanied by fellow barrister Robert Wardell, both of whom were admitted to the New South Wales Bar later that year on 10 September. They actively campaigned for self-government and trial by jury by establishing The Australian (not to be confused with the present-day paper of the same name), the colony's first privately owned paper. Governor Sir Thomas Brisbane realised there was little point in continuing to censor The Sydney Gazette when the former was uncensored, and so government censorship of newspapers was abandoned in 1824, and the freedom of the press began in Australia. With an editorial leaning toward the rights of ex-convicts (known as emancipists), the paper was in frequent conflict with Governor Ralph Darling, who attempted unsuccessfully to have it banned in 1826. Wentworth became a director of the Bank of New South Wales in 1825.

That year, Wentworth declared his disinterest in holding public office. "As a mere private person I might lead the colony, but as a servant of the Governor I could only conform to his whims, which would neither suit my tastes nor principles," he reasoned.

One contemporary, commenting on flogging and other harsh punishments administered to convicts, recorded the change brought by the liberal-minded Australian:

...the system is not now so bad as it used to be. Since Dr Wardell and young Mr Wentworth came out, and began to look after the government and the magistrates, there are not such dreadful doings as there used to be in former times.

Wentworth's support for the rights of emancipists pitted him against the opposing "exclusive" faction. During a public meeting to commemorate the outgoing Governor Brisbane, Wentworth pined to deprive them "of their venom and their fangs”. He moved a successful motion requesting that Brisbane lobby Westminster for “the immediate establishment” of trial by jury and “Taxation by Representation.” He called for an elected legislature, saying that “there are colonists of … very great influence at home who are inimical to the establishment in New South Wales of the British Constitution.” Wentworth and Wardell opined in The Australian:

Public meetings open the eyes of the people—shew them their own strength—moral as well as physical and convey to their reasoning faculties truths, to which, but for them, they might remain strangers. Public meetings expose the irresistibility of the people, if they firmly and legally claim their political due.

In 1826, Privates Joseph Sudds and Patrick Thompson committed an act of theft, hoping to be discharged. Governor Darling sought to make an example of the two, sentencing Thompson and an ill Sudds to seven years' hard labour, with the unusual addition of being chained from the neck for the duration. The subsequent death of Sudds inflamed Wentworth, and he demanded that Darling be recalled. He declared Darling guilty of "murder, or at least a high misdemeanour" for Sudds' death.

In 1827, Wentworth's father died and William inherited much from his highly valuable assets, becoming one of the wealthiest individuals in the colony and growing his land holdings to over 7,000 acres. He purchased land at Vaucluse and rebuilt the existing house on the site into a mansion named Vaucluse House, which he moved into from Petersham. Wentworth also acquired property in Homebush.

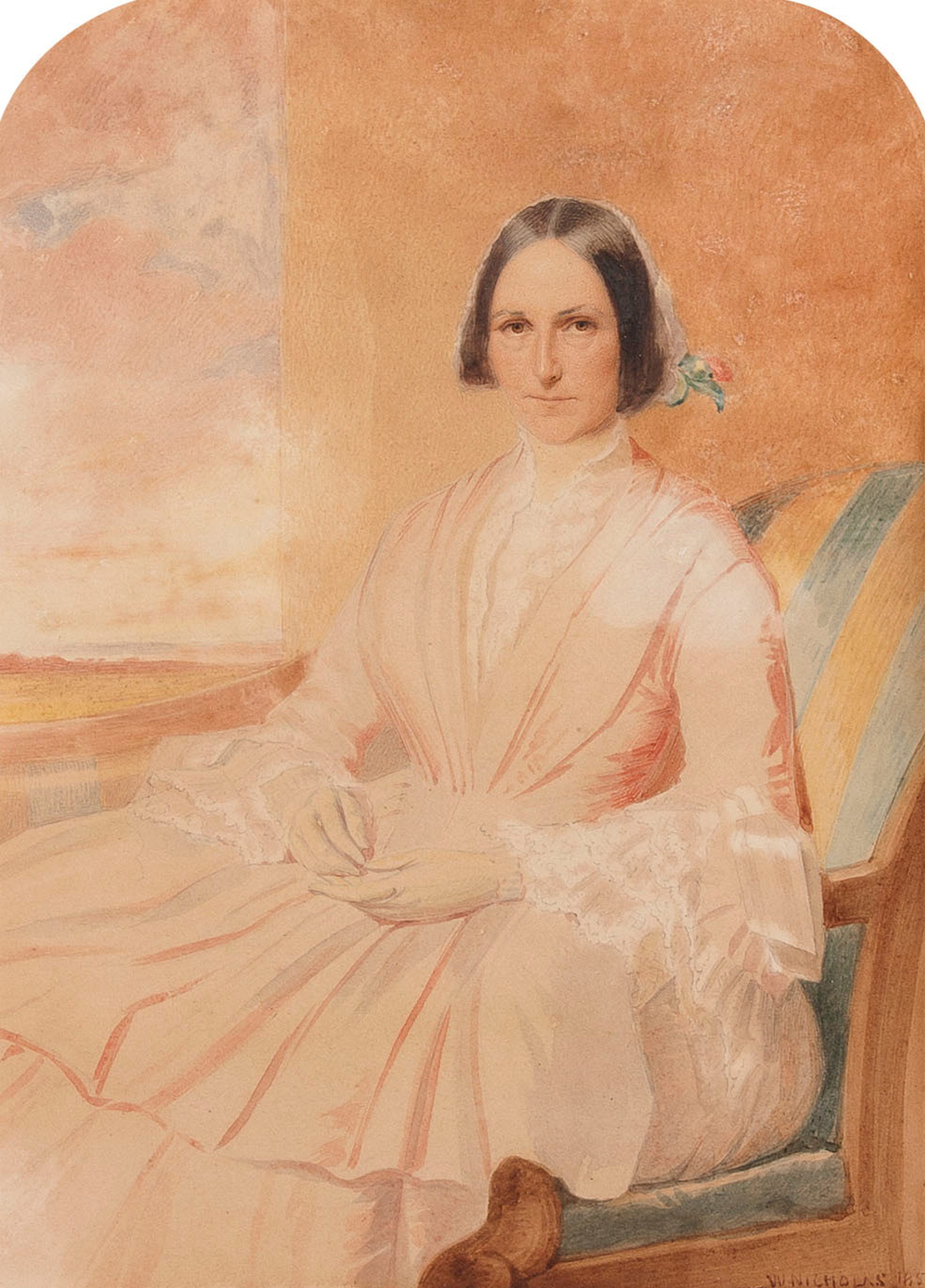
Sarah Wentworth

On 26 October 1829, Wentworth married Sarah Cox, a convict-descended currency lass whom he had represented in her successful 1825 breach of promise suit. The proceeding had been the first such case in Australia. William and Sarah had already named their first daughter Thomasine, in honour of Governor Sir Thomas Brisbane. A love poem from William to Sarah appeared in The Australian three days prior to their marriage.

Darling's reassignment of The Monitor's foreman printer — a convict — to a road gang furthered conflict between himself and the reformists. Wentworth made the legal argument that convicts could only be removed from assignments if such was to their benefit. Subsequently, in 1830, the same was incorporated in legislation by the Imperial Parliament. The Governor was thereafter required to consult the Executive Council before any reassignment.

=== Powerful squatter ===
Wentworth expanded his property holdings, obtaining large pastoral grazing licenses throughout New South Wales. In 1832, he acquired land at Gammon Plains, and in 1836 he bought the Windermere estate, expanding his Hunter River holdings. In the 1830s he formed partnerships with Captain Thomas Raine and John Christie in taking up land along the Macquarie River from Narromine to Haddon Rig. In the 1840s with John Charles Lloyd, he acquired further massive landholdings along the Namoi River and at Manilla. In the Murrumbidgee River region, Wentworth employed Augustus Morris to establish huge squatting licenses in his name.

Some of these properties were immense and became famous as highly valuable sheep and cattle stations. These included the 120,000 acre Yanko property, the 200,000 acre Tala station, the Wambianna cattle property and the Galathra and Burburgate holdings. Wentworth was able to obtain most of these vast accumulations of land for only the £10 annual squatting fee, and after stocking them, was able to sell the properties for considerable profit.

In 1839, Wentworth led a consortium of Sydney speculators in an attempt to acquire a large amount of land in New Zealand from the resident Ngāi Tahu people. In exchange for paying chief Tūhawaiki a lump sum of £100 with an annual payment of £50, as well as £20 upfront and £10 annually for the other chiefs, Wentworth laid claim to 8 million hectares, which amounted to around a third of the entire New Zealand land mass. This included the third of the South Island purchased by Edward Gibbon Wakefield from Te Rauparaha, an enemy of the chiefs Wentworth dealt with. The deed, 1,000 words long, was densely written. The Ngāi Tahu chiefs meanwhile received legal counsel from Wentworth, who advised them not to assent to any treaty with Governor George Gipps unless it recognised sales they made. Governor Gipps intervened to prevent the transaction from proceeding, openly accusing Wentworth of an outrageous and immoral fraud against the Māori. Wentworth argued that the Māori had a right to dispose of their land as they saw fit. The dispute heightened the fierce enmity between the squatters and Gipps. After a series of tit-for-tat retaliations, Wentworth swore "eternal vengeance" against him.

=== Budding politician ===
Flag used by Wentworth and William Bland as candidates for the Legislative Council

During the 1830s, Wentworth continued to push his ideals of free emigration, trial by jury, rights for emancipists and elected representation. On 29 May 1835, he chaired a meeting to discuss Henry Lytton Bulwer's proposal for a colonial committee to represent New South Wales. The committee would act through a Parliamentary Advocate, for which Bulwer nominated himself. The attendees resolved to raise £2,000 for the position's establishment, by establishing the Australian Patriotic Association. Someone complained about the £5 fee for directing members; Wentworth reportedly remarked that "ignorance and poverty went together," and argued that the stipulation would ensure "men of talent, education and experience and exclude only the ignorant pretender.” He committed £50 to the organisation.

Co-established by Wentworth and ex-convict William Bland, it is believed to have been the first political party in Australia. While it began as a broad church, division soon grew over the rights of emancipists. This was augmented by Wentworth drafting two bills on its behalf, which proposed not just representative government, but also the repeal of all restrictions on trial by jury.

In 1842, the British Government passed a new constitution for the colony, under which elected representatives in the Legislative Council would outnumber those nominated by the Crown. The following year, 24 members were elected by eligible land-holding male citizens. Although these changes seemed to democratise governance in New South Wales, they markedly increased the influence of the wealthy squatters, due to the prerequisite of owning at least £2,000 worth of land in order to be a candidate. Wentworth was elected to the Council in 1843 for Town of Sydney and soon became the leader of the conservative party, opposed to the liberal-minded members led by Charles Cowper. The political climate in New South Wales had changed, and with Wentworth becoming one of the wealthiest and most powerful landholders in the colony, his views became very conservative.

=== Squatter leader ===
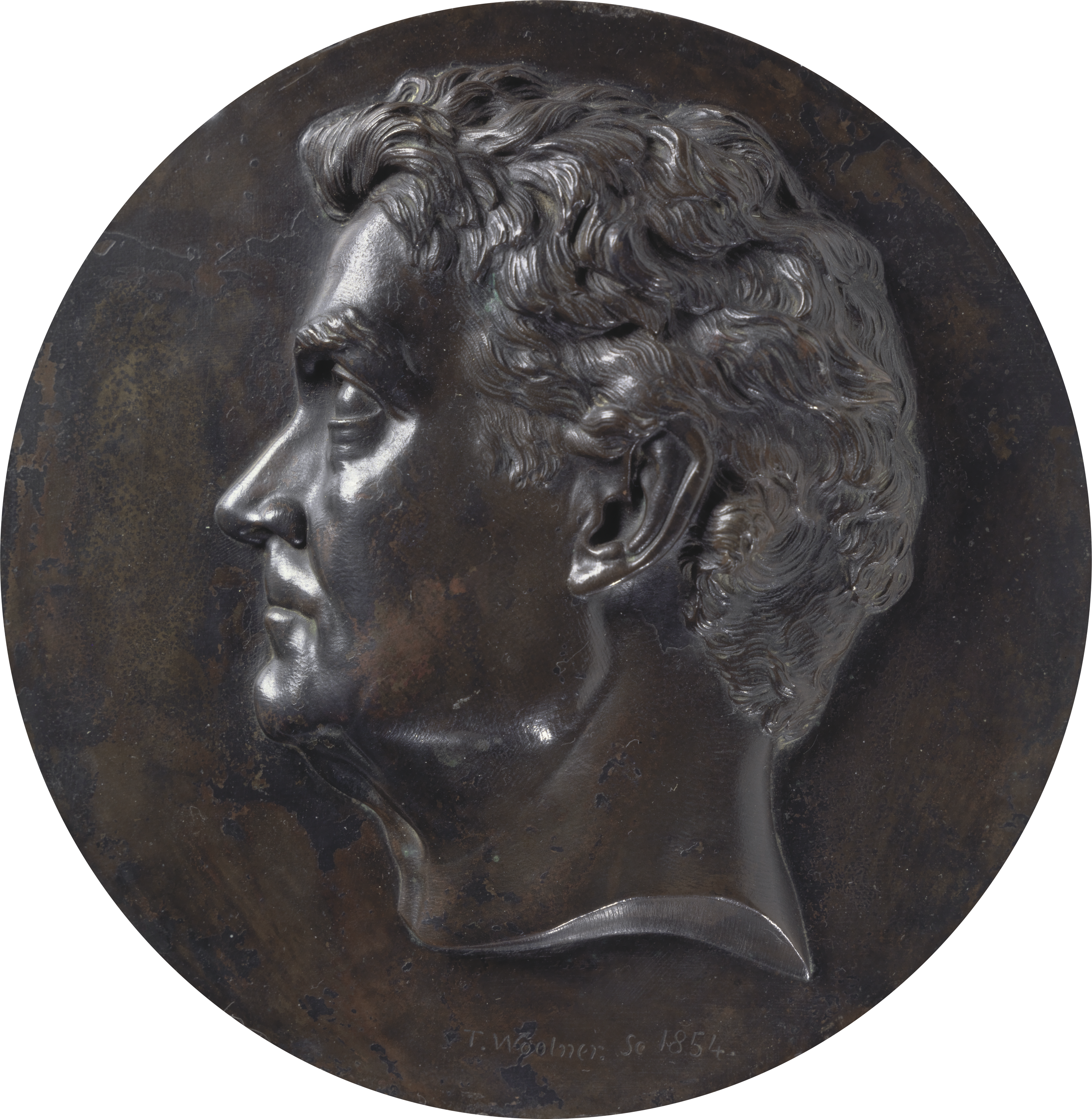
A bronze medallion portrait of Wentworth by Thomas Woolner, 1854

Wentworth positioned himself in the legislature as a vocal leader for the wealthy squatters and landowners. He vehemently opposed any reforms that threatened the status of this "squattocracy" class. He was one of the chief opponents of Governor Gipps in 1846, when he wanted to fund free emigration to the colony through additional tariffs on squatting licences. With Gipps out of the picture, the squatters achieved dominance.

Convict transportation to the colony ended in 1840 and with it the squatters lost a very cheap source of labour to work on their properties. Wentworth no longer approved of free European migration to fill the void, as this was more costly; he later reversed his position again during the 1851 election campaign. With other members of the "squattocracy" such as James Macarthur, Wentworth advocated for the introduction of indentured Chinese coolie labour and procured them as servants at his Vaucluse mansion and on his grazing properties. Wentworth advanced Chinese coolies six Spanish dollars for their passage, to be paid back over a five year labour contract. He pressed charges against absconders, who were punished with jail terms of hard labour. Following one sentencing, an interpreter for the Chinese workers verbally abused Wentworth, who subsequently charged him for absconding. The interpreter was sentenced to two months' imprisonment with hard labour. During the trial, Wentworth quipped that the prisoners ought to be forced to work on treadmills.

In 1851, he argued to retain the death penalty, arguing that "hardened felons, convicted of repeated grave offences would be punished best by death" and that such punishment would be "more reformatory in its effects" than any other. He argued that the British government "had in its system of punishment gone too far, and had gone from the extreme of too great severity to too little." In light of these sentiments, The Australian, the progressive paper that Wentworth was no longer associated with, stated in the early 1850s that Wentworth's opinions were then worth nothing.

Wentworth continued to advocate for causes related to self-government. During his time leading elected conservatives in the Legislative Council between 1843 and 1854, Wentworth led agitation for the local control of Crown lands and revenue. In 1848, following the Earl Grey's suggestion for a "central authority" of the Australian colonies, he proposed the establishment of "a Congress from the various Colonial Legislatures" to legislate on inter-colonial matters. This preceded Australian federation in 1901.

Being an owner of property in the Hunter Region, he chaired a public meeting establishing the Hunter River Railway Company in April 1853. The company devised the railway line between Newcastle and Maitland, though it ran into financial trouble and was bought by the Government during construction. Wentworth foreshadowed the line's extension to Scone up north and Sydney down south; the line ultimately developed into the Great Northern Railway connecting Sydney and Queensland.

At the end of his career, Wentworth would change tact on the issue of land administration, agreeing to land reforms opposed by the squatters.

=== Aboriginal Australians ===
As a young author in 1819, Wentworth wrote that Aboriginal Australians "occupy the lowest place in the gradatory scale of the human species," with no houses, clothing nor agriculture, and tools "of the rudest contrivance and workmanship." He believed that, to them, "the superior enjoyments to be derived from civilization" constituted "but a poor compensation for the sacrifice of any portion of their natural liberty." He romanticised their lifestyle in his 1823 epic poem Australasia.

Wentworth was favourable towards the Parramatta Native Institution, noting that by recent accounts, the children "voluntarily placed there by their parents ... were making equal progress in their studies with European children of the same age." Meanwhile, he recorded that the smallpox outbreak responsible for "the most dreadful ravages ... will likely long survive in the traditionary songs of these simple people."

He wrote that Aboriginal Tasmanians were, "if possible, still more barbarous and uncivilised" than those of the mainland. Yet, Wentworth blamed the "inconsiderate and unpardonable conduct" of the colonists for the "hatred and hostility" shown towards them by the indigenous inhabitants. He specifically attributed the "murderous discharge" or "unmerited and atrocious act of barbarity" that was the Risdon Cove massacre. Previously, the indigenous people had "evinced the most friendly disposition" towards the newcomers.

In 1827, Wentworth was the defence counsel for Lieutenant Nathaniel Lowe, who was accused and acquitted of shooting dead an Aboriginal prisoner. He argued that Englishmen were justified in punitively killing Aboriginal people, as the law had an "inability" to punish them and therefore did not exist to protect them, whom he described as being "one degree just above the beasts of the field — possessing no understanding beyond a confused notion of right and wrong, and that is all."

We could not, according to any principles, have assumed any right of sovereignty over them; they are the free occupants of the demesne or soil; it belongs to them by law of nations, anterior to any laws which follow from human institutions ... there is no right of empire among them, no Chieftain in a condition, from their vagabond state, to make a treaty with the head of any civilized government. If there be no public compact of this sort, there can only exist a tacit compact among individuals, which goes no further than to say, we will be at peace with you if you keep peaceable with us, and that compact would be sufficient to authorize the gentleman at the bar to punish any of these natives who violated this compact, in any way he might think fit.

In 1844, there was a push to reform the judicial system to allow evidence to be given by Aboriginals. Wentworth was vociferous in his opposition, claiming that it would be "quite as defensible" to receive for evidence "the chatterings of the ourang-outang as of this savage race," drawing a rebuke from fellow MLC Roger Therry. When the issue was brought before the Council again in 1849, he referred to the proposal as "most fatal to the natives themselves [and] most cruel to the white inhabitants." He simultaneously referred to the hangings of the 1838 Myall Creek massacre perpetrators as "judicial murder" – his obituary reported that "the Crown was thought by Mr. Wentworth, and by many more, to have strained the law against those who slew the savages," with their executions "bitterly and even fiercely resented by Wentworth, and ... perhaps, never forgiven or forgotten." While arguing against the proposal, Wentworth remarked:

...remember when the Cowpasture tribe made an inroad upon the settled lands, and on that occasion what was the course adopted by the Government? The military were ordered out by the Government—they opposed these savage marauders, and a slaughter, numerically considered very inconsiderable, ensued. But the force of the bullets and bayonets of the English forces prevailed, and peace and quiet was for ever obtained. It was not the policy of a wise Government to attempt the perpetuation of the aboriginal race of New South Wales by any protective means. They must give way before the arms, aye! even the diseases of civilised nations—they must give way before they attained the power of those nations.

In 1849, Wentworth supported the establishment of a Native Police force, believing "it would be the most powerful, perhaps, the only means, of averting those collisions between the blacks and the border settlers which had hitherto unfortunately existed." The first Commandant of the Native Police for the northern districts, Frederick Walker, was a personal friend of Wentworth's who also managed his immense property at Tala on the Murrumbidgee.

Wentworth employed a large number of Aboriginal stockmen.^{:96} When the Wentworths sailed to Britain in 1862, their Aboriginal servant Bobby travelled with them. They arranged for his return after he found the winters too cold, with William approaching the Government for assistance. Sarah remarked that Bobby was “naturally so clever and sensible that I hope he will be content to go back to Vaucluse.”^{:85}

=== Education advocate ===
Wentworth was an ardent supporter of universal and secular education. In his 1819 book, he endorsed the Parramatta Native Institution, and documented other extant schools in the colony. He became a shareholder in the newly-opened Sydney College, a secular boys' school, in 1835.^{:28} He was involved in the establishment of state primary education, in 1844 supporting the introduction of "Lord Stanley's system of national education" used in Ireland, modified so that:

...instead of the clergy and pastors of the several denominations being allowed to impart religious instruction in the schools, the children be allowed to be absent from school one day in every week exclusive of Sunday, for the purpose of receiving such instruction elsewhere...

Wentworth's amendment passed and the National Board of Education was established in 1848 following a change of governor; schools were established for both sexes.

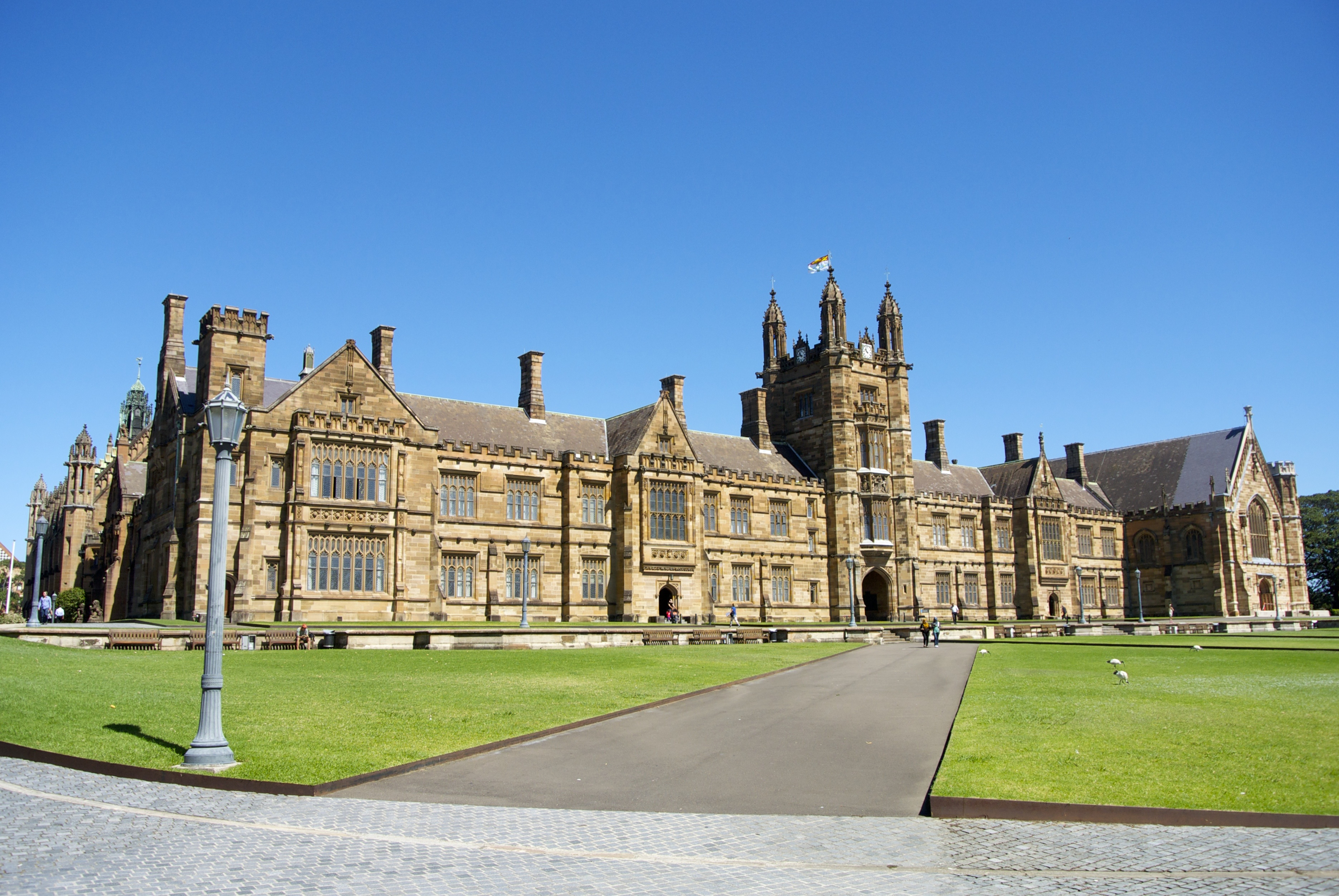
Wentworth was instrumental in the establishment of the University of Sydney

Wentworth was also key in the establishment of the University of Sydney, one of the first public and secular universities in the British Empire. He and fellow MLC Sir Charles Nicholson, a graduate from the University of Edinburgh Medical School, tabled a plan to expand the existing Sydney College, of which Wentworth was on the governing council. Wentworth argued that a state secular university was imperative for the growth of a society aspiring towards self-government, and that it would provide the opportunity for "the child of every class, to become great and useful in the destinies of his country."

I see In this measure the path opened to the poor man to the highest position which the country can afford him. So far from being an institution for the rich, I take It to be an institution for the poor. ... I trust that, from the pregnant womb of this institution will arise a long list of illustrious names—of statesmen—of patriots—of philanthropists—of philosophers—of poets and of heroes, who will shed a deathless halo, not only on their country, but upon the University which called them into being.

He promoted access on the basis of merit rather than religious or social status. Speaking in the Legislative Council in September 1849, Wentworth asserted the Government's responsibility to provide education for the masses:

No doubt on the subject of education great and deplorable apathy had existed in the colony; but while he wished not to excuse the community from their share of the blame, he must confess that this apathy seemed to him to be more chargeable on the Government than on the public. If it was the duty of the governments of other colonies to provide education for the people, that duty became infinitely more imperious here. If it was the duty of the State to instruct the free and virtuous population of those colonies, how much greater the necessity to enlighten the tainted population of this ... it was the paramount duty of the Government to provide for the instruction of the people, and to reclaim it from the mood taint attaching to it, by elevating and enlightening the minds of its inhabitants.

Wentworth was vociferous on the university's secular mandate, declaring that clergy "ought to be excluded altogether from ... [its] management ... its gates must be open to all whether they were disciples of Moses, of Jesus, of Brahmin, of Mohammed, of Vishnu or of Buddha." Though not a follower of organised religion, Wentworth agitated for public funds to be granted for a Jewish minister, and was sympathetic to Catholics in the 1820s when Protestantism was official in New South Wales.

The People's Advocate, a radical Sydney newspaper, praised Wentworth for his efforts to establish the university. The paper perceived "in some of his recent actions evidence of a latent consciousness of not having discharged, his duty to his country, and of a desire to make some expiation for his culpable neglect, not to use a stronger term."

It took two attempts on Wentworth's behalf before the plan was finally adopted, culminating in the passage of the University of Sydney Act 1850 (NSW) on 24 September 1850. Wentworth was among the first members of the university's senate.

Wentworth helped endow the new university. Donations he made funded the establishment of the Wentworth Medal in 1854 and the Wentworth Fellowship in 2020. The 1972-built Wentworth Building is named after him, and a statue of him stands in the Great Hall.

=== Self government ===
Wentworth was an enduring advocate for representative government. In his 1819 book, he wrote:

Every community which has not a free government is devoid of that security of person and property which has been found to be the chief stimulus to individual exertion and the only basis on which social edifice can repose in a solid and durable tranquility.

In April 1851, he established a committee to formulate a motion against the perceived inadequacies of the Australian Colonies Government Act. The "Declaration and Remonstrance" declared, among other things, that "the Imperial Parliament has not, nor of right ought to have any power to tax the people of this Colony," and that "plenary powers of legislation should be conferred upon and exercised by the Colonial Legislature ... [and] no bills should be reserved" for the Imperial Parliament unless they affected the Empire. Sir Henry Parkes later praised Wentworth for this: "His Declaration and Remonstrance is so important as one of the foundation-stones of the fabric of our constitutional liberties."

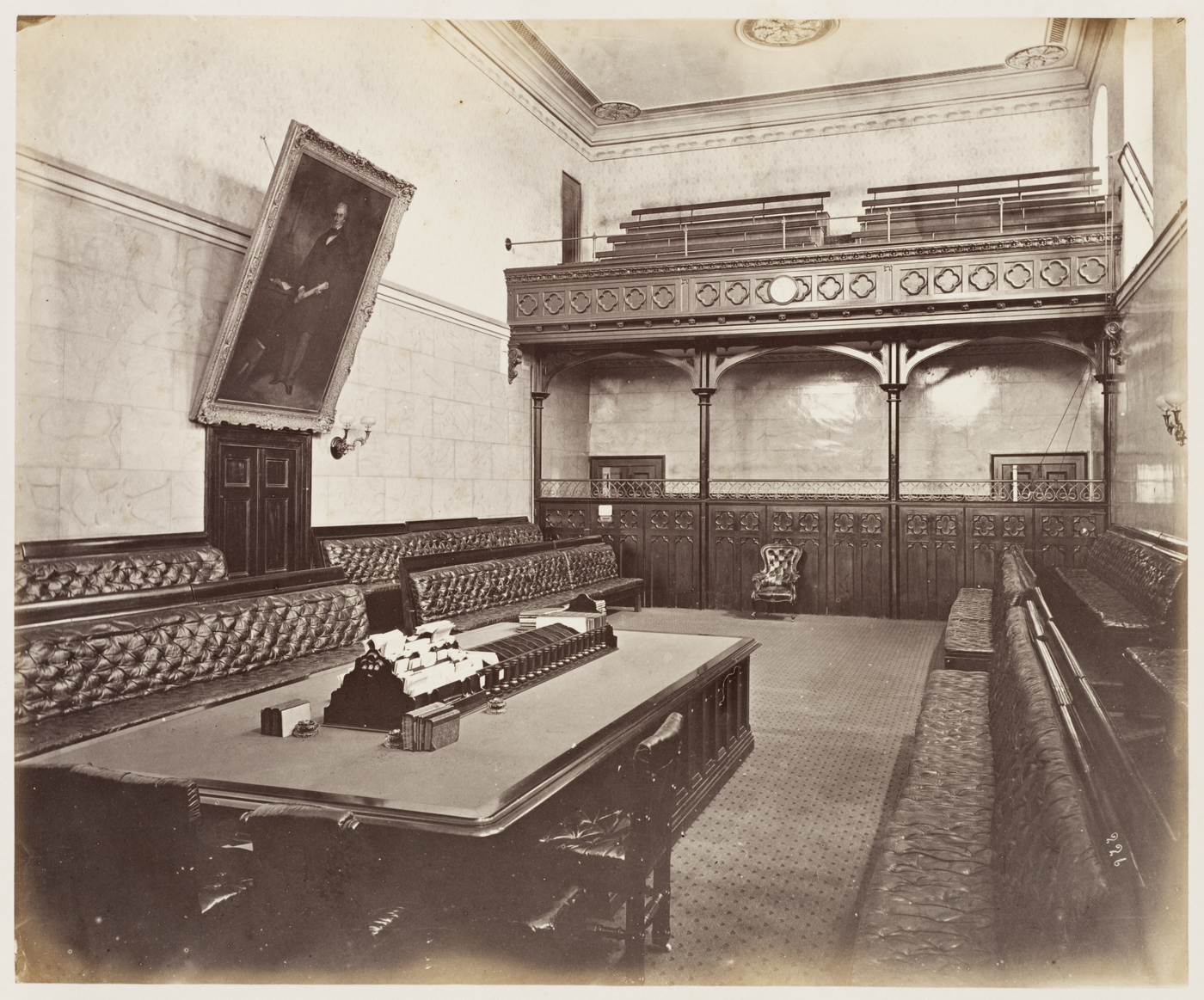
Wentworth was central in the establishment of the Parliament of New South Wales, Australia's oldest. A portrait of him is displayed in the Legislative Assembly chamber

In 1853, Wentworth chaired a committee to draft a new constitution for New South Wales, which was to receive full responsible self-government from Britain. His draft provided for a powerful unelected Legislative Council and an elected Legislative Assembly with high property qualifications for voting and membership. He also suggested the establishment of a colonial peerage drawn from the landowning class. He remarked that he "agreed with that ancient and venerable constitution that treated those who had no property as infants, or idiots, unfit to have any voice in the management of the State." This draft aroused the bitter opposition of the democrats and radicals such as Daniel Deniehy, who ridiculed Wentworth's plans for what he called a "bunyip aristocracy". The draft constitution was substantially changed to make it more democratic, although the Legislative Council remained unelected.

=== Australian confederation ===
Wentworth's constitution committee also proposed a General Assembly of the Australian Colonies to legislate on intercolonial matters, including tariffs, railways, lighthouses, penal settlements, gold and the mail. This was the first outline of the future Australian Commonwealth to be presented in an official colonial legislative report. Previously, Wentworth had proposed a "Congress" of the colonial legislatures in 1848.

In 1857, while in London, Wentworth produced a draft bill proposing a confederation of the Australian colonies, with each colony given equal representation in an intercolonial assembly, a proposal subsequently endorsed by his General Association for the Australian Colonies. He further proposed that a "permissive Act" be passed by Parliament allowing the colonies of Australia or any subset of them which was not a penal settlement to federate at will. Hoping to garner as broad support as possible, he proposed a loose association of the colonies, a structure which was criticised by Robert Lowe. The Secretary of State opted not to introduce the bill, stating that "dissension and discontent" would probably be caused by it. Nonetheless, he distributed it to the colonies for their responses. While there was in-principle support for a union of the colonies, the matter was ultimately deferred. New South Wales premier Charles Cowper and Henry Parkes preferred to focus on liberalising Wentworth's squatter-friendly constitution.

== Return to England ==
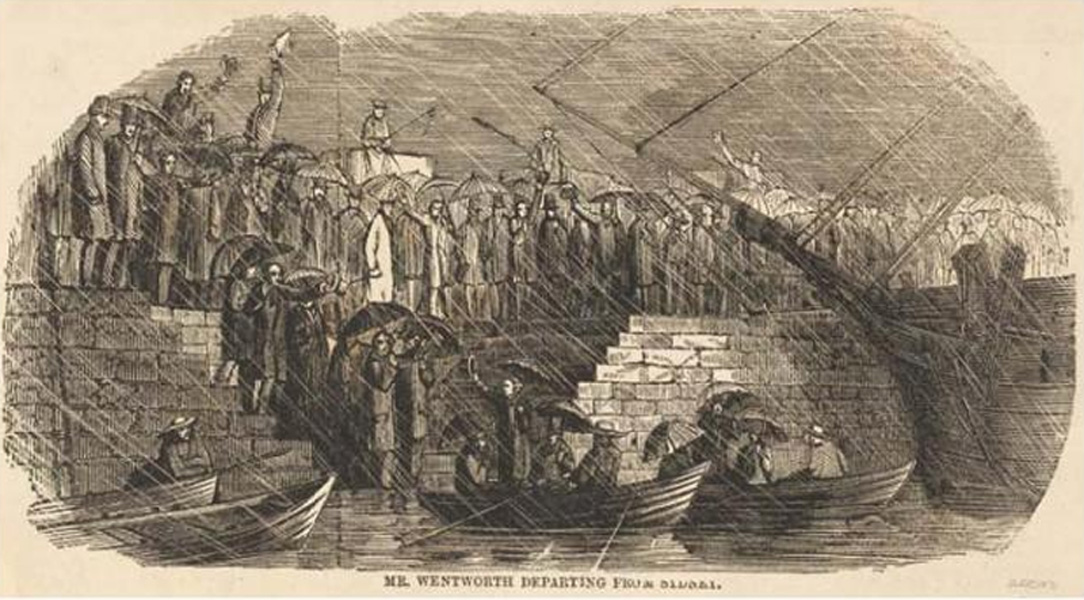
Wentworth leaving Sydney, 1854

Wentworth retired from the Legislative Council of New South Wales in 1854 and sailed for England in March of that same year. His speech to the public during his departure ceremony at Circular Quay was met with both cheers and jeers.

Once in England, he founded the General Association for the Australian Colonies, whose object was to obtain a federal assembly for the whole of Australia. He refused an offer for a baronetcy, and was a member of the Conservative Party and the Conservative Club. He returned to New South Wales for a brief period in 1860-61 to lead the New South Wales Legislative Council, but otherwise remained in England at his Merly House estate. He was elected as a Fellow of the Royal Geographical Society. Despite his ill health, Wentworth continued to attend colonial dinners including for the establishment of what became the Royal Commonwealth Society.

== President of the Legislative Council ==
Upon becoming President of the Legislative Council, Wentworth agreed with Premier Charles Cowper that the Council should be elected and that the Robertson Land Acts should pass, despite the opposition of squatters. This opposition had culminated in the resignation of the previous speaker on the last sitting day of the prior Council.

Wentworth proposed an elected Legislative Council with high property qualifications and a proportional representation quota system. This turned out to be too liberal for Cowper, who let it lapse, preferring reasonable appointees to popularly elected members.

== Death and burial ==
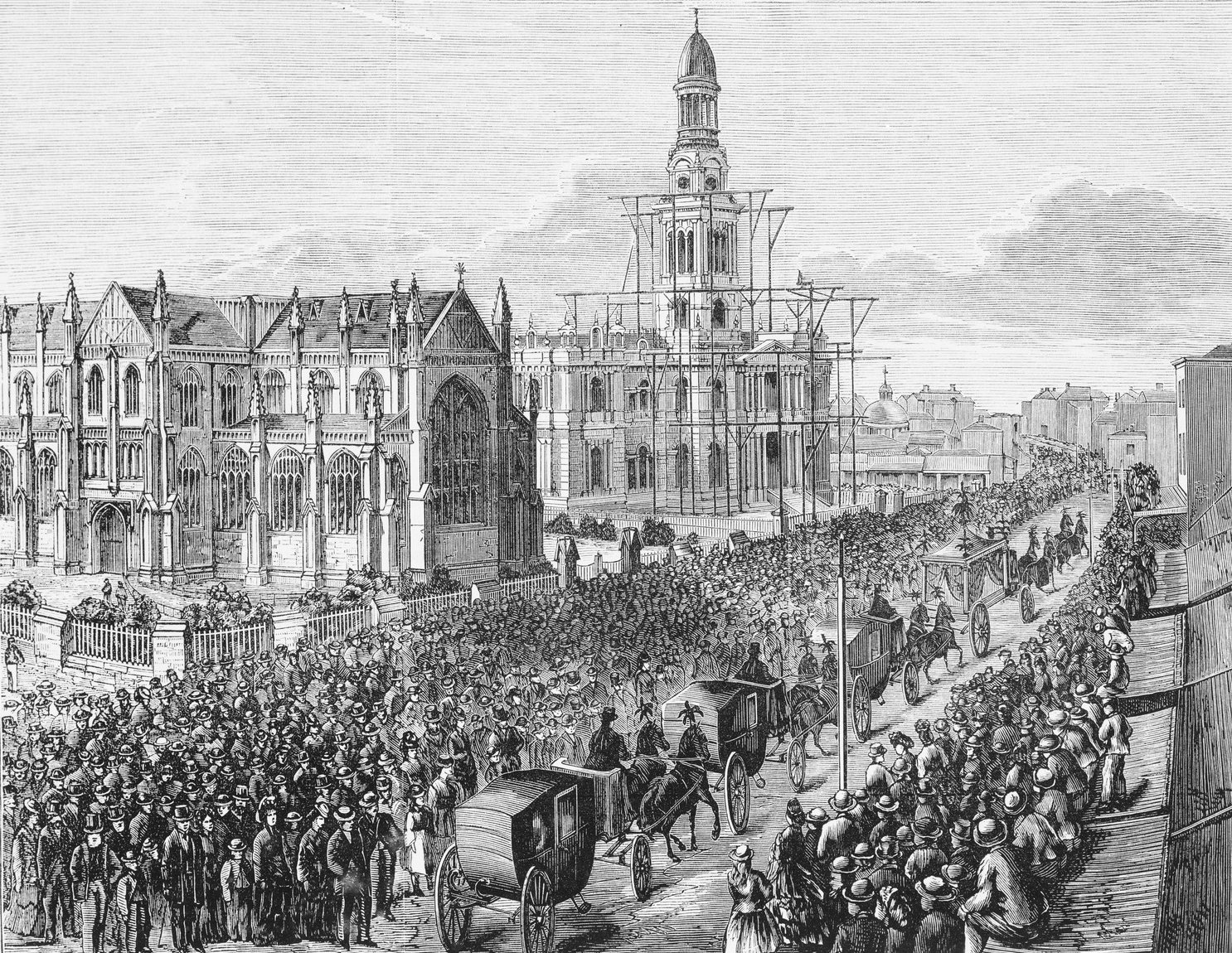
Wentworth's funeral procession along George Street

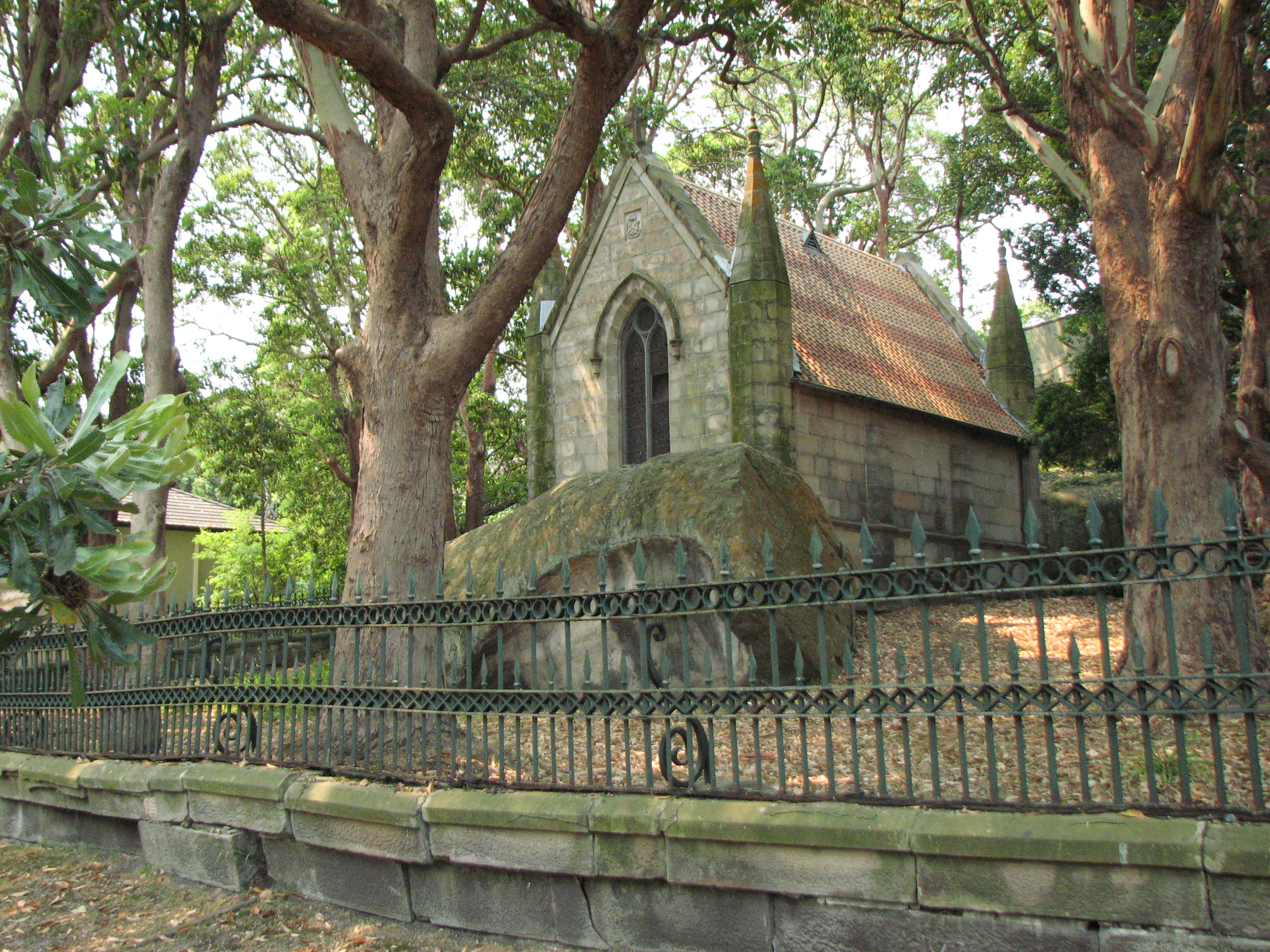
The Wentworth Mausoleum, Vaucluse

Wentworth died on 20 March 1872 at Merley House, Wimborne, Dorset, England. His combined wealth at the time of his passing was £170,000 (equivalent to $29,100,000 in 2022). At his request his body was returned to Sydney for burial. He was given the colony's first state funeral on 6 May 1873, a day declared by the governor as a public holiday. Around 65,000 people lined the route of the funeral procession to Vaucluse, where Wentworth was buried. The Wentworth Mausoleum was soon after constructed over his grave, overseen by his wife Sarah.

== Marriage and family ==
Wentworth had hoped to marry Elizabeth Macarthur, daughter of Elizabeth and John Macarthur, believing such a Wentworth–Macarthur union would ensure him as the head of the pastoral aristocracy. Macarthur did not approve the marriage, however, particularly after Macarthur and Wentworth had a dispute over a loan of money.

On 26 October 1829 at St Philip's Church, Sydney, Wentworth married Sarah Cox (1805–1880). Sarah, the daughter of two convicts, Francis Cox and Frances Morton, had been represented by Wentworth in her successful 1825 breach of promise lawsuit against a certain Captain John Payne. Carol Liston, biographer of Sarah Wentworth, noted that her commissioning of various domestic duties was fundamental to the success of her husband and children. William and Sarah had seven daughters and three sons:

- Thomasine Wentworth (1825–1913)
- William Charles Wentworth (1827–1859)
- Fanny Katherine Wentworth (1829–1893), named after her parents’ mothers^{:21-22}
- Fitzwilliam Wentworth (1833–1915) married Mary Jane Hill, daughter of George Hill.
  - William Charles Wentworth III (1871–1949) married Florence Denise Griffiths, daughter of George Neville Griffiths.
    - William Charles Wentworth IV (1907–2003) (known as Bill Wentworth, Liberal member of Parliament 1949–77, inaugural Minister in charge of Aboriginal Affairs under the Prime Minister)
    - Diana Wentworth Wentworth married Mungo Ballardie MacCallum (1913–99)
      - Mungo Wentworth MacCallum (1941–2020)
- Sarah Eleanor Wentworth (1835–1857)
- Eliza Sophia Wentworth (1838–1898)
- Isabella Christiana (Christina) Wentworth (1840–1856)
- Laura Wentworth (1842–1887) married Henry William Keays-Young in 1872.
- Edith Wentworth (1845–1891) married Rev. Sir Charles Gordon-Cumming-Dunbar, 9th Baronet in 1872.
- D'Arcy Bland Wentworth (1848–1922)

In 1830, he fathered a child, Henry, out of wedlock with Jemima Eagar, the estranged wife of Edward Eagar. Wentworth had supported her with money and a house on Macquarie Street after Edward abandoned her.

Wentworth financially supported his half-siblings from his father and Anne Lawes, paying for their education.^{:26}

== Legacy ==
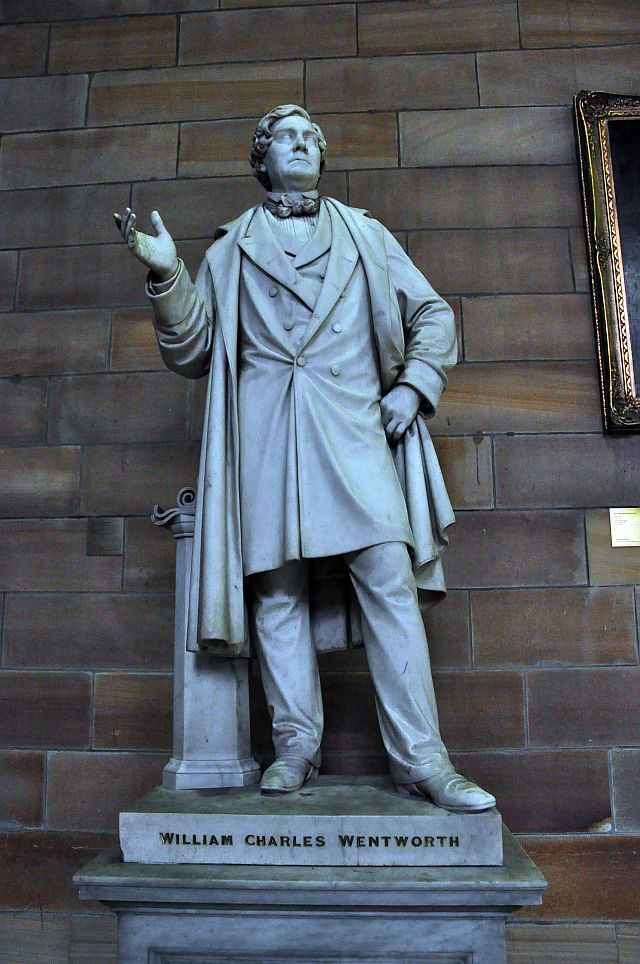
A statue of Wentworth by Italian sculptor Pietro Tenerani, unveiled at the University of Sydney in 1862

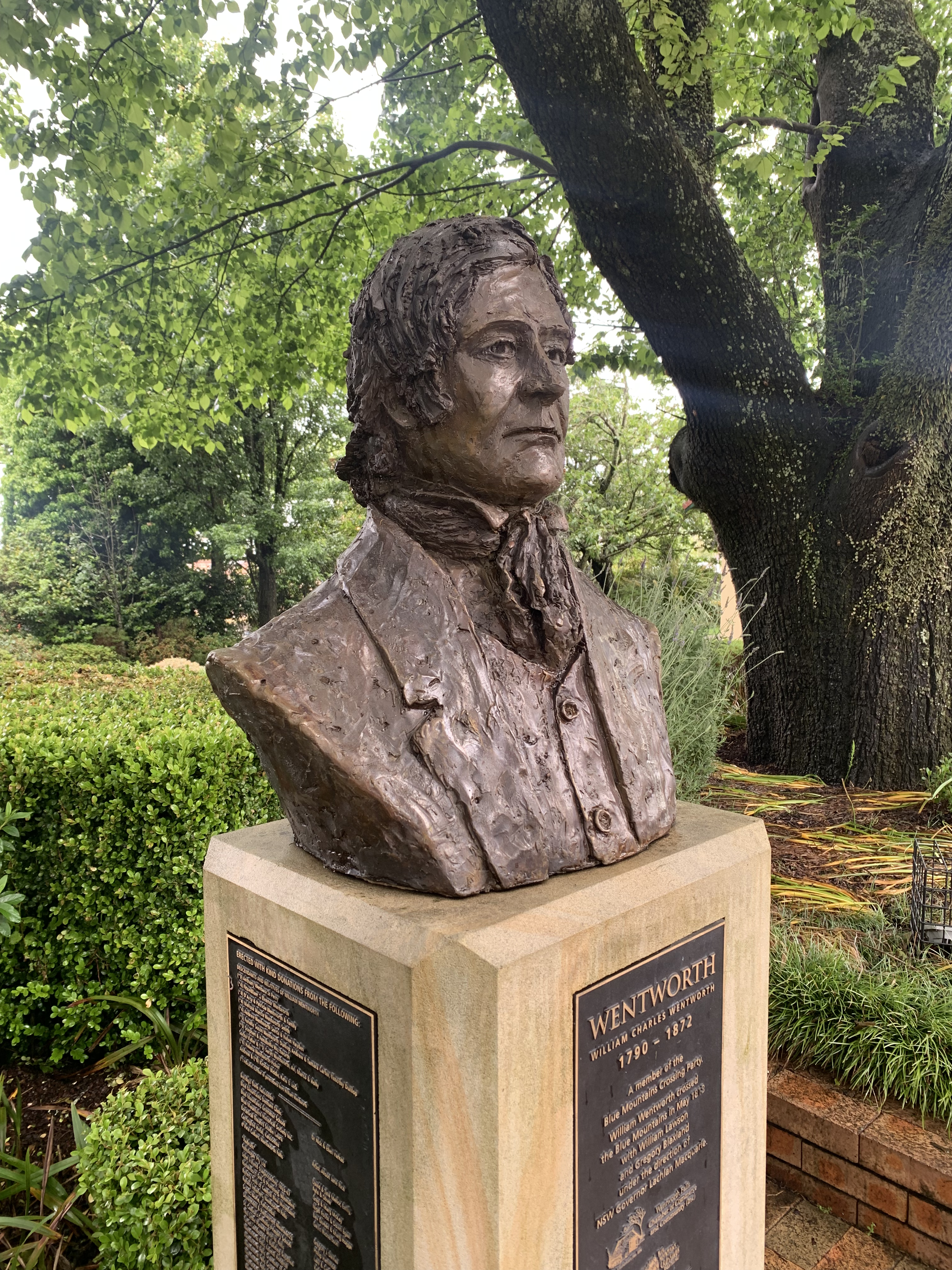
Bust in the eponymous Wentworth Falls, unveiled in 2016

The towns of Wentworth and Wentworth Falls, the federal Division of Wentworth in Sydney's Eastern Suburbs, the Wentworth Falls waterfall, Wentworth Avenue in the Canberra suburb of Kingston, and the Wentworth Shire were named after him. Wentworth Park in Sydney's Inner West was named after Wentworth in 1882.

The University of Sydney Wentworth Medal was established in 1854 from a gift of £200 from Wentworth. It was initially presented to the best essay in English prose and now rewards "an outstanding essay addressing a nominated question." The Wentworth Fellowship, a postgraduate research scholarship within the Faculty of Arts and Social Sciences, was established in 2020 from an 1862 donation by Wentworth. The Wentworth Building, built in 1972 to accommodate the University of Sydney Union, is named after him. The Wentworth Institute of Higher Education, established in 2010, is named after Wentworth.

A large portrait of Wentworth was erected in the New South Wales Legislative Assembly in 1859 following a motion from Sir Henry Parkes. The original Legislative Council room in New South Wales Parliament House (now adjoining the Legislative Assembly chamber) was in 2013 named the Wentworth Room, after D'Arcy and William Charles Wentworth.

The Wentworths' estate in Vaucluse became Australia's first official house museum, established as such in 1915. Wentworth is recognised in the name of the Wentworth Memorial Church, built in honour of servicemen and women of the Second World War. The church and the adjacent Wentworth Mausoleum fall within the former boundaries of the Vaucluse estate.

Wentworth and Wardell's clash with Governor Darling was dramatised in the 1940 radio play Spoiled Darlings and the 1962 TV series The Patriots, both broadcast by the ABC. Wentworth also appears as a character in the 1935 film Heritage (1935).

In 1963 he was honoured, together with Blaxland and Lawson, on a postage stamp issued by Australia Post depicting the Blue Mountains crossing. He was again in 1974 on the anniversary of the first independent newspaper being founded.

A statue of Wentworth, sculpted by Pietro Tenerani of Rome, stands at the University of Sydney. Another statue of Wentworth is located on the exterior of the Department of Lands building in Sydney. A bust of him was unveiled in Coronation Park, Wentworth Falls in 2016.

Historian Manning Clark described Wentworth as "Australia's greatest native son," which Jeremy Stoljar SC writes "seems to have been a description of Wentworth's standing in the colony at the time – specifically, at about the time of Wentworth's marriage in 1829". K. R. Cramp of the Royal Australian Historical Society refers to him as "Australia's greatest son" in his booklet William Charles Wentworth of Vaucluse House, first published in 1918. Wentworth's contemporary Robert Lowe referred to the unselfish devotion to his nation by "this great son of Australia".

== Works ==
- A Statistical Account of the British Settlements in Australasia, 1819
- Journal of an expedition, across the Blue Mountains, 11 May-6 June 1813, 1813
- Australasia: a poem written for the Chancellor's Medal at the Cambridge commencement, July 1823, London: G. and W.B. Whittaker, 1823

== Sources ==
- Barton, The Poets and Prose Writers of New South Wales (Sydney, 1866)
- Rusden, History of Australia (London, 1883)
- Sir Bernard Burke. History of the Colonial Gentry Vol 1: 1891: pps.95-97: Wentworth
- Lewis Deer and John Barr: Australia's First Patriot: The Story of William C. Wentworth: Angus & Robertson Ltd.: Sydney 1911.
- K. R. Cramp, M. A.: William Charles Wentworth of Vaucluse House: A.H. Pettifer Government Printer: Third Edition 1923
- Michael Persse: Wentworth, William Charles (1790–1872)
- Michael Persse. W. C. Wentworth, Oxford University Press, Melbourne 1972 (comprising 30 pages).
- Carol Liston (1988). Sarah Wentworth, Mistress of Vaucluse: Historic Houses Trust of NSW ISBN 0-949753-34-3.
- John Ritchie (1997). The Wentworths: Father and Son. The Miegunyah Press at Melbourne University Press. ISBN 0-522-84751-X.
- Ivy Bailey (1999). Single-handed Patriot: A Story of William Charles Wentworth: Book House: Glebe, NSW. ISBN 9781740180306.
- Andrew Tink (2009), William Charles Wentworth: Australia's greatest native son Allen & Unwin. ISBN 978-1-74175-192-5
- Robert Griffin, Joy Hughes, Anne Toy and Peter Watts: Vaucluse House: A History and Guide: Historic Houses Trust of New South Wales: 3rd Edition 2006.

== See also ==
- Political families of Australia: Wentworth/Hill/Griffiths/Scott/Cooper family
- Wentworth family

New South Wales Legislative Council
New creation	Member for City of Sydney; June 1843 – April 1854; With: William Bland 1843–48, 1849–50; Robert Lowe 1848–49; John Dunmore Lang 1850–51; Robert Campbell 1851–54; John Lamb 1851–53; William Thurlow 1853–54	Succeeded by Henry Parkes
Preceded by William Westbrooke Burton	President of the New South Wales Legislative Council; 24 June 1861 – 10 October 1862	Succeeded by Terence Aubrey Murray
