= Robert Wardell =

Australian businessman (1793–1834)

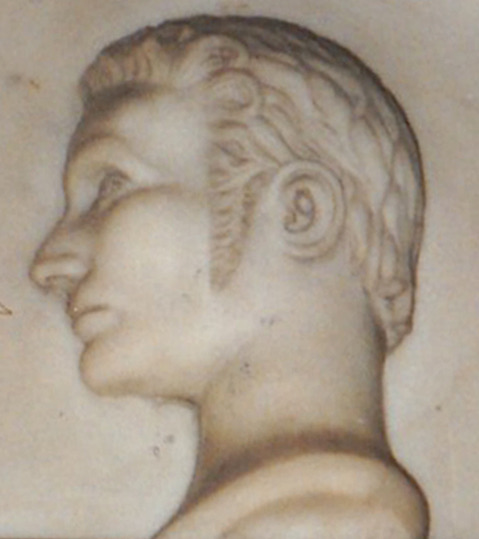
Robert Wardell, marble tablet, St James Church, Sydney

Robert Wardell (1793 – 7 September 1834) was an English-born Australian barrister and newspaper editor.

== Early life ==
Wardell was born in England and educated at Trinity College, Cambridge, where he matriculated 1810, gained his LL.B. in 1817 and a LL.D. in 1823. Wardell was editor and proprietor of the Statesman, a London evening paper, when in 1819 he met William Charles Wentworth. In 1821, Wardell was one of a number of newspaper editors in London accused of “the publication of seditious libels.”

In 1823, Wardell applied for the new position of attorney-general in New South Wales but was unsuccessful; the position went instead to Saxe Bannister.

== Australia ==
In 1824 Wardell sold his Statesman paper and formed a partnership with Wentworth to found an Australian newspaper, and they sailed for Australia, arriving about September. On 14 October 1824, the pair published the first copy of The Australian, Australia's first independent newspaper. Planned as a weekly paper, each edition would cost one shilling.

Wardell and Wentworth became involved in several disputes with members of the Australian government over the paper. He fought a duel, in late 1826, with the then former Attorney-General, Saxe Bannister. An item in The Australian titled, 'How-e to live by plunder', resulted in a second duel, in 1827, this time with Governor Darling's brother-in-law and private secretary, Lieutenant Colonel Henry Dumaresq; nobody was injured in either duel.

In 1831 Governor Darling was informed by Frederick John Robinson, 1st Viscount Goderich that his six-year term as governor would soon be expiring; he was replaced by the liberal-minded Governor Richard Bourke. Wardell, who by then was the sole editor of the paper, mellowed and his writings became less fierce.

Wardell was killed by an escaped convict on 7 September 1834.

Wardell Road, which runs south from Petersham, in Sydney, is named after him.

== Popular culture ==
Wardell appears as a character in the radio play Spoiled Darlings and the mini series The Patriots.
