= John Willett Adye =

British politician

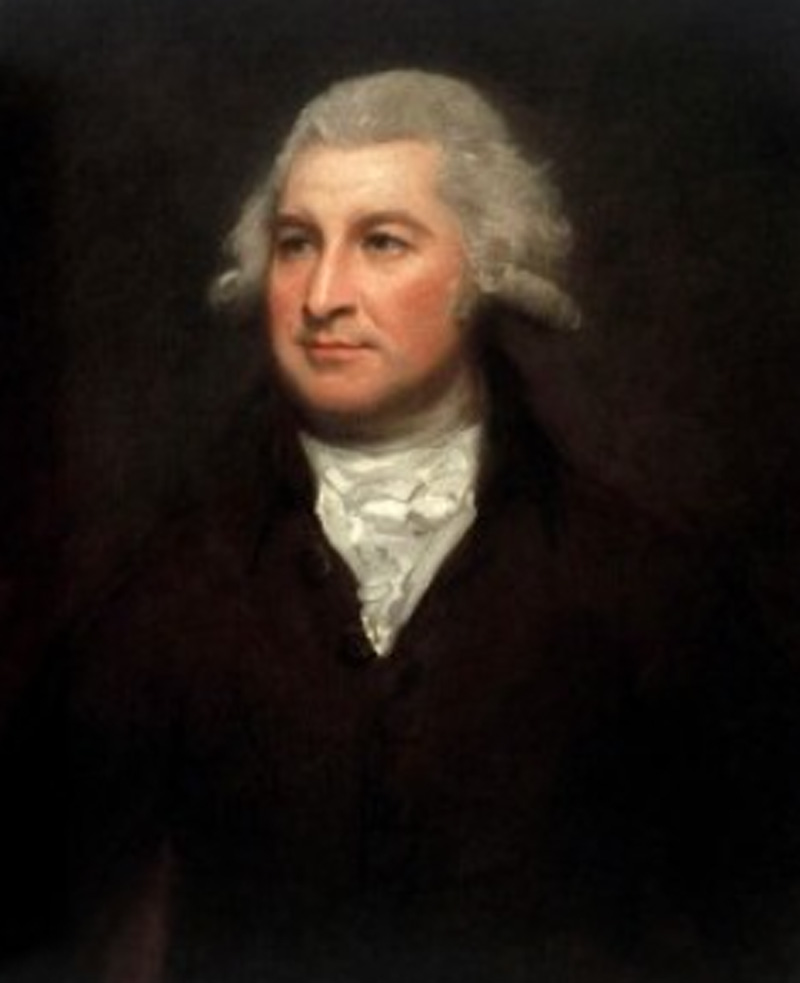
John Willett Adye, portrait c.1785 by George Romney

John Willett Adye (1745–1815), in later life John Willett Willett, was a British politician.

== Life ==
He was the second son of Stephen Adye of St Kitts and his wife Clara Payne, born 1 January 1745. He was adopted while still young by Ralph Willett, a first cousin of his mother. After education at Lincoln's Inn, he took to the gentlemanly life of a collector, following the example of his adoptive father Willett.

Willett died in 1795. Adye was his principal heir, to plantations in St Kitts, and under a condition of the will took Willett as his surname. The following year he was elected as Member of Parliament for New Romney. A supporter of William Pitt the younger, he did not stand in the 1806 United Kingdom general election after Pitt's death.

In later life Willett had financial troubles, and during 1813 sold collections from Merley House. He died on 26 September 1815. He was a Fellow of the Royal Society and of the Society of Antiquaries of London. A monument to him was placed in the church of Canford Magna.

== Family ==
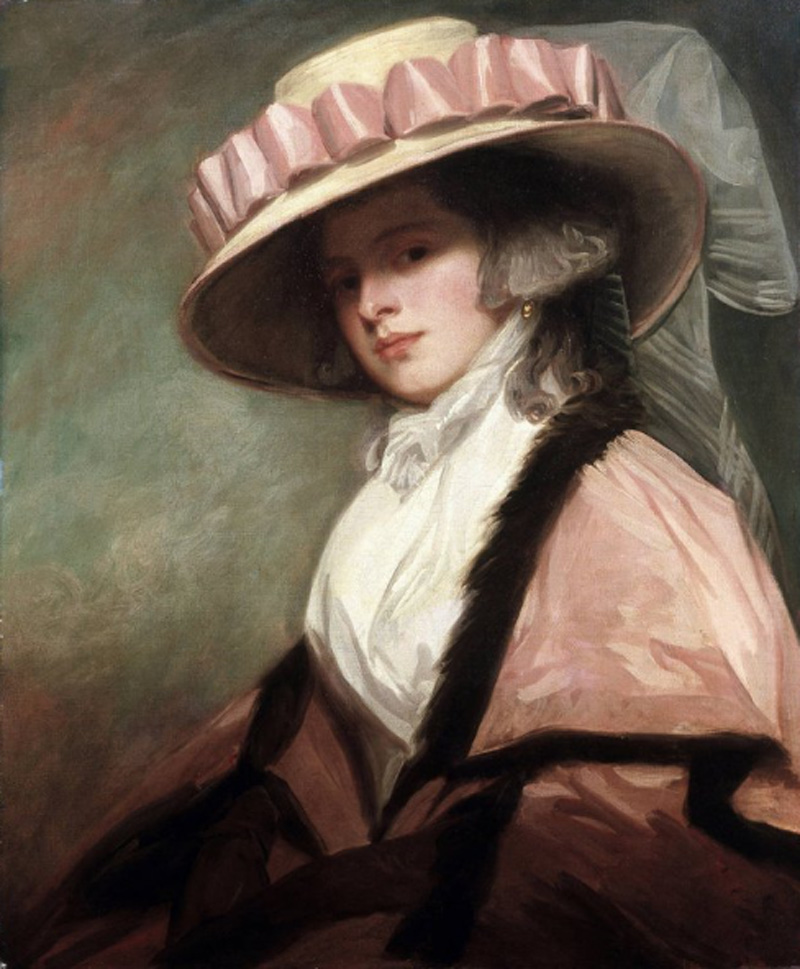
Catherine Adye, first wife of John Willett Adye, portrait by George Romney

Adye married:

1. In 1780, Catherine Brouncker (died 1798), daughter of Henry Brouncker of St Kitts; and
2. In 1805, Frances Wilson.

Sons of the first marriage included the eldest, John Willett Willett Jr., (1784–1839), declared a lunatic, and Henry Ralph Willett, a barrister, to whom the estate passed.
