= Hunter River Railway Company =

Australian railway company (1853–1855)

- Type: Public company
- Industry: Railway transport
- Founded: 20 April 1853
- Defunct: 23 April 1855
- Fate: Bought by the Government of New South Wales
- Successor: New South Wales Government Railways
- Headquarters: Sydney, Australia
- Area served: Hunter Valley

The Hunter River Railway Company was formed in 1853 to develop a railway from Newcastle to Maitland in New South Wales, Australia. When the company faced financial difficulties during construction, it was bought by the Government of New South Wales and the line subsequently opened in 1857. The line devised by the company is the oldest section of what became the Great Northern Railway from Sydney to Wallangarra on the Queensland border.

== History ==
=== Foundation ===
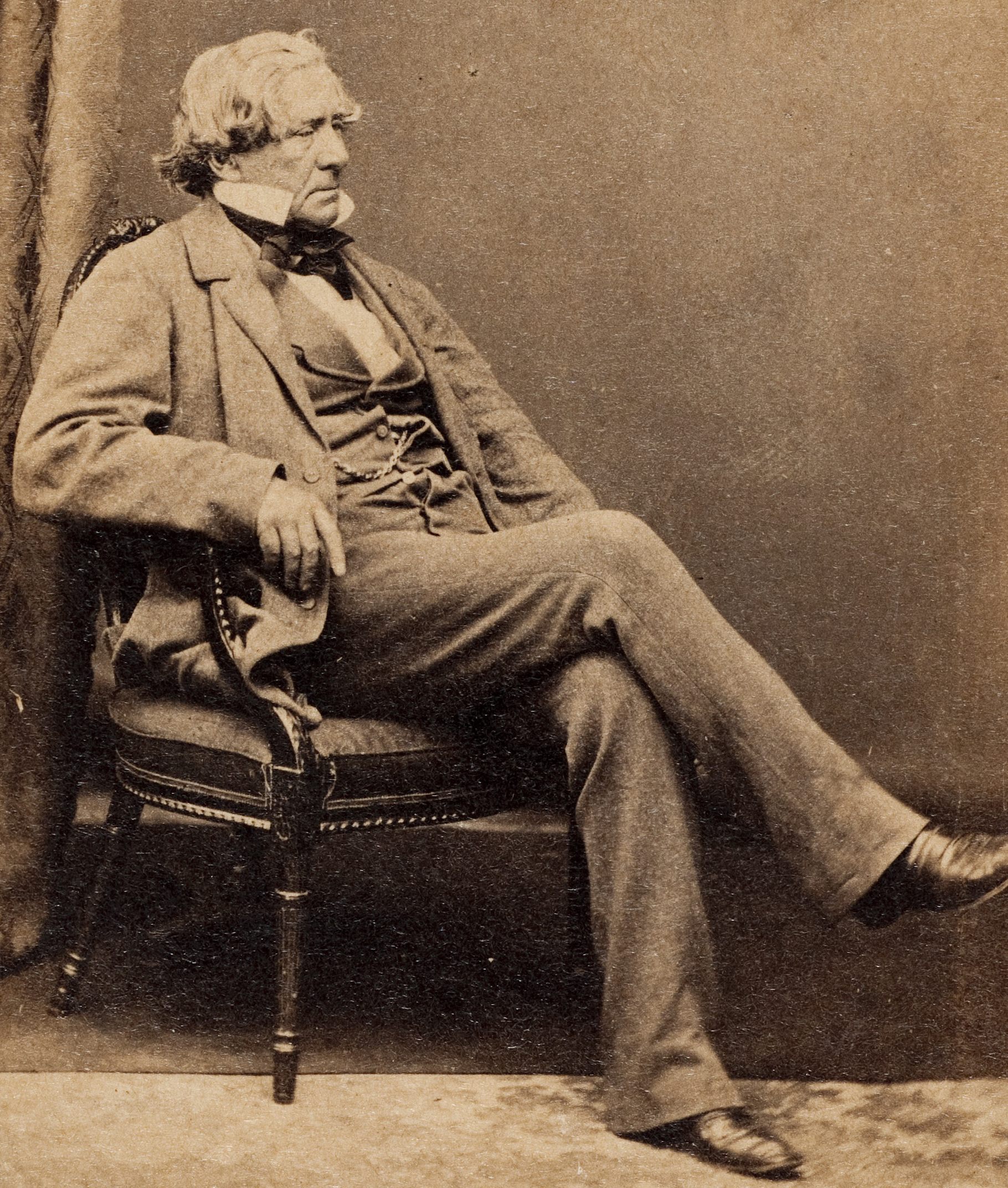
William Wentworth was one of the prominent figures involved in the company's establishment.

On 20 April 1853, a public meeting was held at the Royal Hotel in Sydney to discuss the creation of a company for the development of a railway between Newcastle and Maitland. The meeting was chaired by the statesman William Wentworth. Among the political figures in attendance were Legislative Council speaker Sir Charles Nicholson, future premier Charles Cowper and Legislative Council members W. Bradley, T.W. Smart, Captain King RN and Dr. Douglas. Also attending were commercial figures Captain W. Russell, J. Gilchrist, T. Holt, J. B. Darvall, T.S. Mort, J.E. Ebsworth, C. Kemp, S.D. Gordon, David Jones, Dr Mitchell, John Croft and J.F. Josephson, and others. Wentworth gave a speech about the project and its potential, as the Sydney Morning Herald reported:

Intimately acquainted with the district and its resources, the honourable and learned member described, in his usual lucid manner, the favourable results of the careful surveys which had been made; the trifling nature of the engineering difficulties, even if the line were afterwards extended to Scone, to the North, and Sydney to the South; and last, but not least, he reminded the meeting of the well-known fact that the county of Durham, and the Hunter River district generally, were the most productive localities in the colony.

The attendees resolved to seek land grants for terminals and stations, and capital funding, from the Government. An Act of the Legislative Council granting the Company authority to build a railway "in or near Newcastle terminating in or near East Maitland or West Maitland and beyond" received royal assent on 18 October 1853. The company was based in Sydney. It held its first general meeting of shareholders on 8 November 1853. The first meeting of directors was held on 11 November, electing Charles Kemp as chairman.

=== Construction ===
A Mr Lundie who had surveyed the route ten years prior devised plans which were purchased and used by the company. Chief engineer James Wallace of the Sydney Railway Company was attained as consultant engineer. A surveyor and a resident engineer were also appointed. The appointments took place during the directors' meeting on 11 November.

The ex-Southampton ship Ellenborough arrived on 31 October 1853 with a hundred labourers contracted by the railway, as well as construction materials and tools. There were arrangements for 500 labourers to be procured for construction. A tender for the construction of a line from Merewether Street in Newcastle to Hexham was accepted. The company chairman, Charles Kemp, turned the first sod on the project on 8 November 1854.

=== Dissolution and sale ===
A meeting of shareholders in early January 1855 determined "That it is expedient to dissolve the railway company, and to sell and dispose of the railways, and all other property, works, and effects, belonging to the company, to her Majesty's Government." The company was sold to the New South Wales Government on 23 April 1855. A circular republished by the Maitland Mercury the prior month stated that:

Every year will add to the length of its line, and as it is contemplated by the Hunter River Railway Company to run the line to the utmost extent of the northern districts, to New England, it will add to the means of our shipping the whole of the pastoral produce at our port.

The line was opened on 30 March 1857 by Governor Denison. The initial terminus was on the site of what is now Victoria Street station.

=== Immigrant Ships ===
As well as the Ellenborough mentioned above, there were at least four ships that brought railway workers from Britain directly to the port of Newcastle in 1855.

The Lord George Bentinck arrived on 9 March 1855 with 119 immigrant men, women and children, and 650 tons of iron for the company.

A day later, on 10 March 1855, the Blackfriar arrived with 173 immigrants aboard.

The Libertas arrived 28 June 1855 with 86 railway labourers and their families, as well as rails and other materials for the company.

The last ship was the Anglia with 248 immigrants. The railway workers onboard had been promised a good job paying a daily wage of six shillings and sixpence. However, the ship arrived on 24 September 1855, after the company had been liquidated. The captain refused an order to sail to Sydney, because he had been contracted to land at Newcastle. After a stand off lasting about two weeks, on 9 October 1855, a notice was posted on the Newcastle Court House: "Immigrants per Anglia - The public are informed that the immigrants by the above vessel are allowed to land and hire out with whatsoever employer they think fit".

== Legacy ==
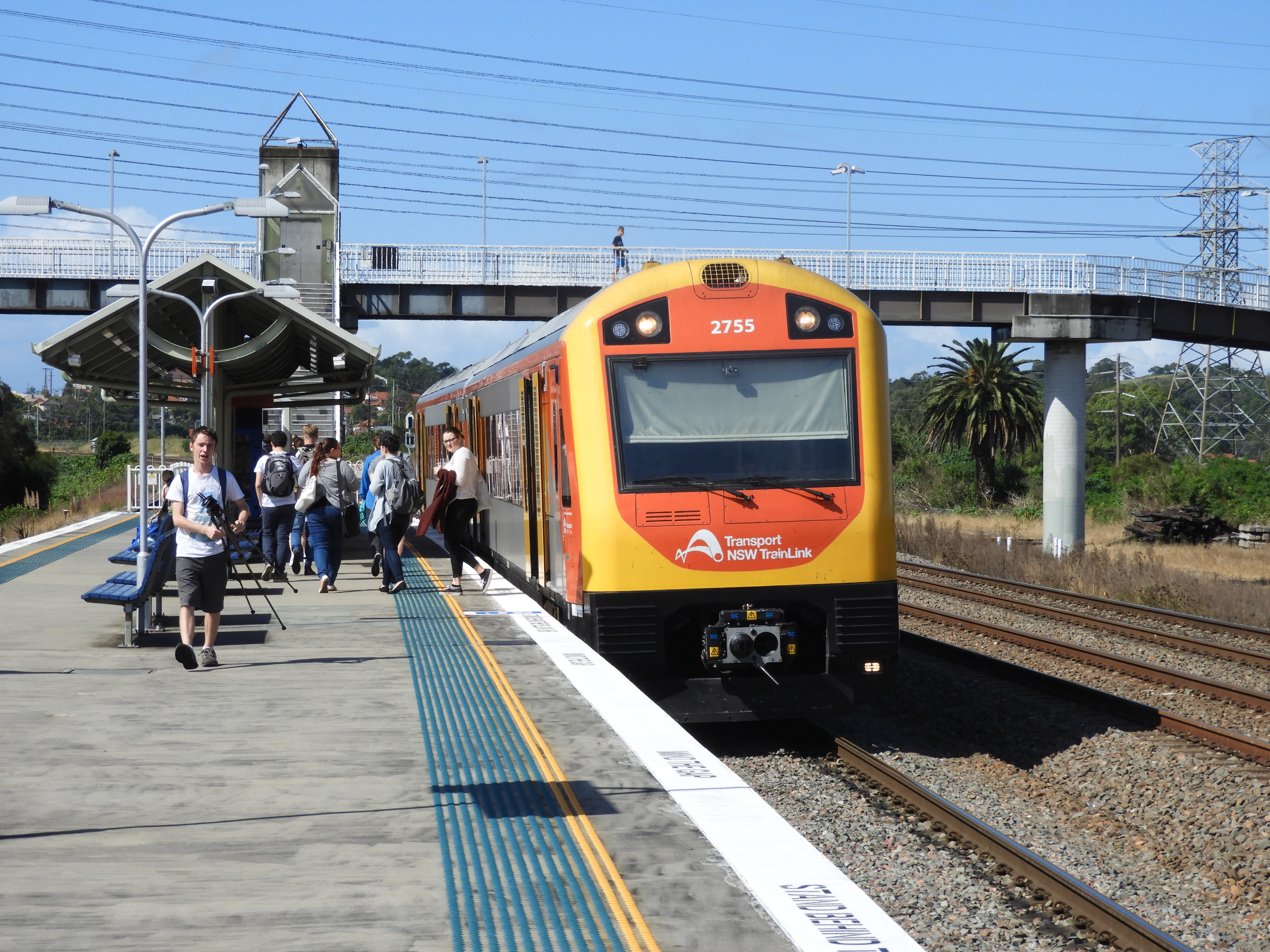
A passenger service at Warrabrook on the original section of the Main North line

The line devised by the Hunter River Railway Company is the oldest section of what became the Great Northern Railway, or Main North line, which at its maximum extent ran from Sydney to Queensland, terminating at Wallangarra. Passenger and goods trains continue to run on the line as far as Armidale.

== See also ==
- Sydney–Brisbane rail corridor
