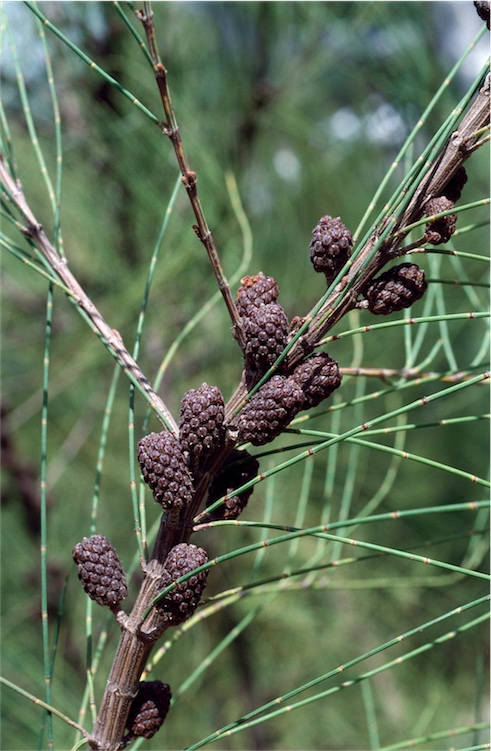
- In the Australian National Botanic Gardens

Conservation status
- Endangered (EPBC Act)

Scientific classification
- Kingdom: Plantae
- Clade: Tracheophytes
- Clade: Angiosperms
- Clade: Eudicots
- Clade: Rosids
- Order: Fagales
- Family: Casuarinaceae
- Genus: Allocasuarina
- Species: A. portuensis

Binomial name
- Allocasuarina portuensis L.A.S.Johnson

= Allocasuarina portuensis =

Nielsen Park she oak

Species of tree

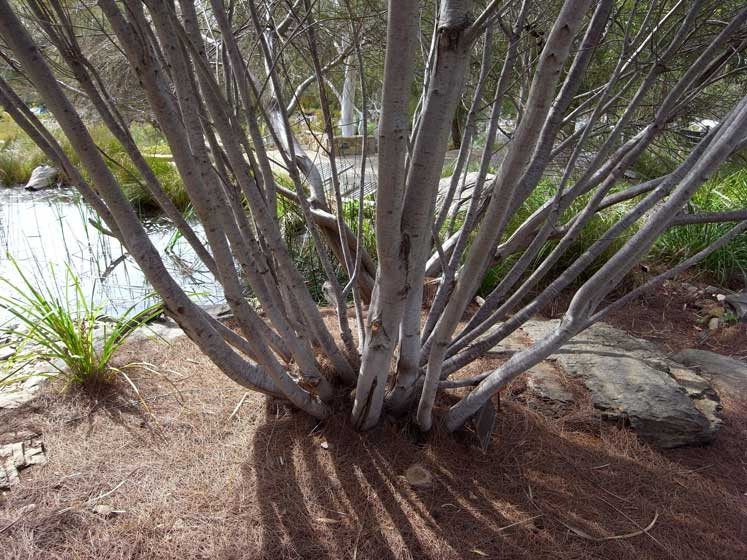
Stems with smooth bark

Allocasuarina portuensis, commonly known as Nielsen Park she-oak, is a species of flowering plant in the family Casuarinaceae and is endemic to a restricted part of the Sydney region in eastern New South Wales. It is a slender, dioecious shrub with branchlets up to 270 mm (11 in) long, the leaves reduced to scales in whorls of seven or eight, the fruiting cones 12–15 mm (0.5–0.6 in) long containing winged seeds (samaras) 4–5 mm (0.16–0.20 in) long.

== Description ==
Allocasuarina portuensis is a slender, dioecious shrub that typically grows to a height of 3–5 m (9.8–16.4 ft) and has smooth bark. Its branchlets are spreading to drooping, up to 270 mm (11 in) long, the leaves reduced to erect or slightly overlapping, spreading to curved backwards, scale-like teeth 0.7–1.1 mm (0.03–0.04 in) long, arranged in whorls of seven or eight around the branchlets. The sections of branchlet between the leaf whorls are 13–20 mm (0.5–0.8 in) long and 0.8–1 mm (0.03–0.04 in) wide, usually with a faint, waxy bloom. Male flowers are arranged in spikes resembling a string of beads 50–100 mm (2–4 in) long, with about 3.5 to 4.5 whorls per cm (per 0.4 in), the anthers 0.8–1 mm (0.03–0.04 in) long. Female cones are borne on a peduncle 2–15 mm (0.08–0.6 in) long, the mature cones 12–15 mm (0.5–0.6 in) long and 8–10 mm (0.3–0.4 in) in diameter. The winged seeds (samaras) are dark brown and 4–5 mm (0.16–0.20 in) long.

Nielsen Park she-oak resembles Allocasuarina rigida and A. diminuta, but both usually lack male flowers arranged like a string of beads. Allocasuarina littoralis occurs in the same area as A. portuensis, but the former is a tree with fissured bark, also lacking the unusual arrangement of its male flowers.

== Taxonomy ==
Allocasuarina portuensis was first formally described in 1989 by Lawrie Johnson in Flora of Australia from specimens collected in Sydney Harbour National Park in 1986. The species was discovered by Peter Brookhouse in the south-eastern part of Nielsen Park earlier the same year. The specific epithet portuensis means 'inhabiting a port'.

== Distribution and habitat ==
At the time of its discovery, only two male and six female plants were known, at six locations in the south-eastern part of Nielsen Park. It is likely that the species previously had a wider distribution, since the vegetation of Nielsen Park at the time of European settlement was widespread on the foreshore of Sydney Harbour, but has since been extensively cleared. At the time of its discovery, the species was growing in tall, closed woodland with Port Jackson fig (Ficus rubiginosa), smooth-barked apple (Angophora costata), blueberry ash (Elaeocarpus reticulatus) and cheese tree (Glochidion ferdinandi) in the canopy, and an understorey including Pittosporum revolutum, Kunzea ambigua and Monotoca elliptica. The original habitat was degraded by weeds, such as asparagus "fern" (Protasparagus densiflorus), wandering Jew (Tradescantia albiflora) and Lantana camara. The original vegetation may have been more sclerophyllous, the absence of recent wildfire allowing the presence of more mesophyllic species, such as Glochidion ferdinandi and Pittosporum revolutum.

== Conservation ==
Allocasuarina portuensis is listed as "endangered" under the Australian Government Environment Protection and Biodiversity Conservation Act 1999 and the New South Wales Government Biodiversity Conservation Act 2016.

Efforts to propagate and reintroduce the species began from the time it was identified, and plants were planted at several locations around Nielsen Park and nearby Gap Bluff and Hermit Point. 54 of these remained alive in 2000.
