= Nielsen Park =

Historic site in New South Wales, Australia

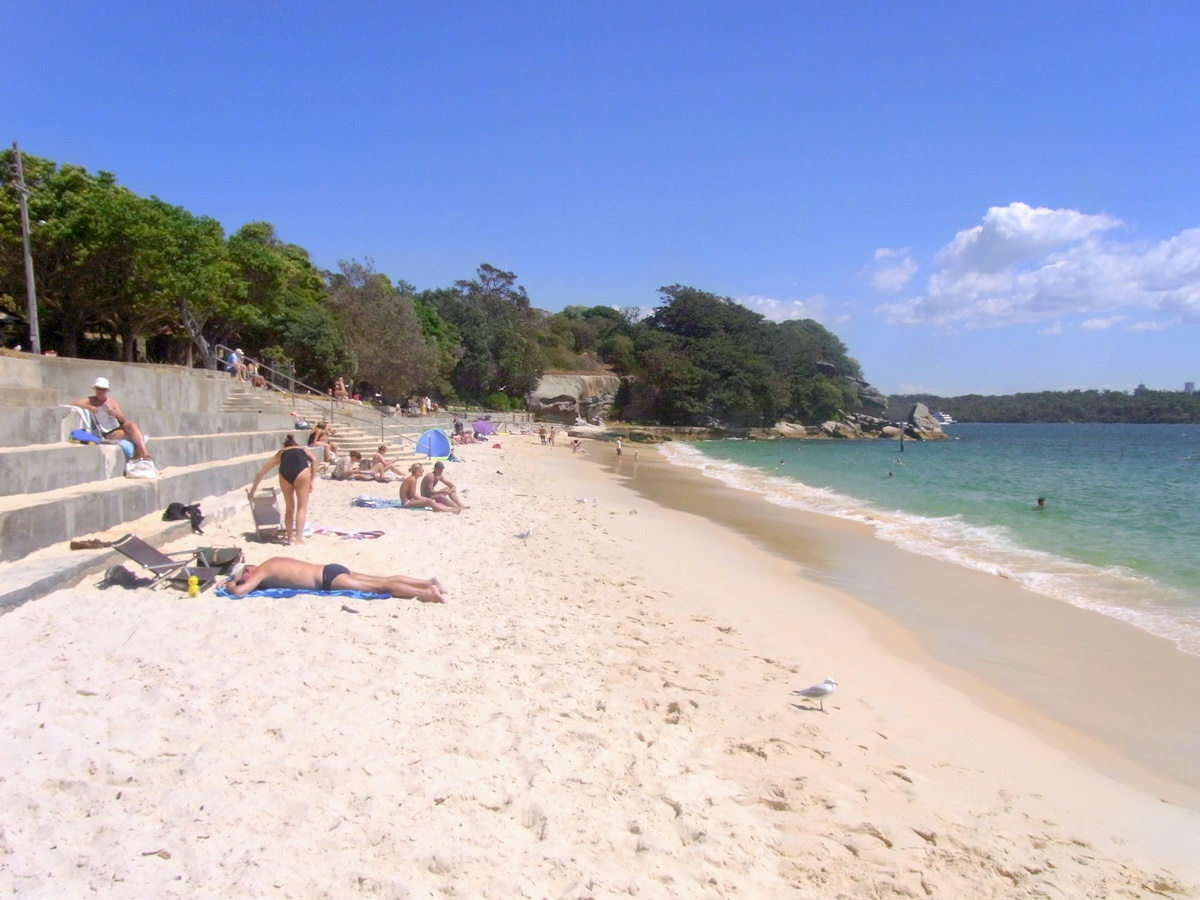
- Shark Beach at Nielsen Park

- Location within east Sydney
- Location: Greycliffe Avenue, Vaucluse, Municipality of Woollahra, New South Wales, Australia
- Nearest city: Sydney
- Coordinates: 33°51′08″S 151°16′01″E
- Established: 6 July 1910; 116 years ago
- Designer: John Frederick Hilly; James Barnet; Office of the New South Wales Government Architect
- Etymology: The Hon. Niels Nielsen (Secretary for Lands)
- Manager: NSW National Parks & Wildlife Service (as part of Sydney Harbour National Park)

New South Wales Heritage Register
- Official name: Nielsen Park; Vaucluse Estate; Greycliffe Estate; Greycliffe House
- Type: State heritage (landscape)
- Designated: 28 August 2017
- Reference no.: 1988
- Type: Historic Landscape
- Category: Landscape – Cultural

Nielsen Park is a heritage-listed historic site, park and nature reserve located at Greycliffe Avenue, Vaucluse in the Municipality of Woollahra local government area of New South Wales, Australia. The traditional lands of the Birrabirragal people, the park was designed by John Frederick Hilly, James Barnet and the Office of the New South Wales Government Architect. It is also known as Vaucluse Estate, Greycliffe Estate and Greycliffe House. It was added to the New South Wales State Heritage Register on 28 August 2017.

Nielsen Park is a part of Sydney Harbour National Park. It is a popular recreation area and beach, known as Shark Beach, on Port Jackson. The kiosk is dated from 1914.

== History ==
Nielsen Park is part of the traditional land of the Birrabirragal people, an Aboriginal people. The site was an attractive occupation site due to its accessibility, supply of fresh water and fishing resources. Extensive archaeological evidence at Nielsen Park demonstrates use of the land for camping and fishing over an extended period. To date there are 14 recorded Aboriginal sites within the park, each containing middens, rock shelters and various aesthetic pieces. Archival records attest to the continuing use of the land by Aboriginal people post-European contact. For example, during the Wentworth family occupation of the site 1827-1911 Aboriginal people were recorded to be camping at the site. The recorded sites and potential unknown archaeological deposits link the Birrabirragal peoples of the past to Aboriginal peoples of the present. The landscape continues to be of cultural value for Aboriginal people.

With the arrival of the Colonists the land comprising Nielsen Park went through several phases of private ownership. In 1793 Governor John Hunter made a grant to Thomas Laycock, Deputy Commissionary - General Quartermaster in the NSW Corps of 32 hectares (80 acres). Three years later in 1797 the land was purchased by Capt. Thomas Dennett and named Woodmancote. Six years later in 1803 Sir Henry Brown Hayes purchased the land along with another 40 acres and together the lands formed the Vaucluse Estate. Hayes built a house and cleared the land; 20 hectares (50 acres) for cattle, orchards and vegetables. Hayes also leased the land to Samuel Breakwell who in turn leased it to Sir Maurace O'Donnell, who then leased it to Captain John Piper. Piper went on to purchase some of the estate until in 1827 his economic circumstances took a downturn and he sold the land to William Charles Wentworth who was granted another 150 hectares (370 acres) bringing the Vaucluse Estate to 208 hectares (515 acres).

Previously part of the Wentworth Estate, the area which became Nielsen Park was once owned by William Wentworth. It was disused since 1898 after the death of Wentworth's last surviving unmarried daughter Eliza Sophia Wentworth, at a time when little of Sydney Harbour's foreshore was accessible to the public. From the 1890s, pressure built to buy back private land, and following agitation by the Harbor Foreshores Vigilance Committee (sic), the New South Wales Government took control of 9.3 hectares (22.9 acres) of the Vaucluse estate on 6 July 1910. Known as Vaucluse Park, it was soon renamed Nielsen Park in honour of The Hon. Niels Nielsen, the Secretary for Lands from 1910 to 1911, once an additional 21 hectares (51 acres) were added in 1911.

The historic 1851 residence Greycliffe House lies within its grounds, and after 1911 served as a neonatal hospital and mothercraft residence before its eventual function as an office for the NSW National Parks and Wildlife Service and visitors centre for the Sydney Harbour National Park. Nielsen Park is part of the traditional land of the Eora or Birrabirragal people. Shell middens lie on the walk west of Nielsen Park towards Rose Bay.

=== The Vaucluse Estate ===
William Charles Wentworth, explorer, author, barrister, landowner, and statesman was born to Catherine Crowley, a convict and D'Arcy Wentworth. William Wentworth, Gregory Blaxland, and William Lawson are credited with making the first major colonial exploration by crossing the Blue Mountains in 1813. As a reward he was granted 400 hectares (1,000 acres) in addition to an earlier grant of 710 hectares (1,750 acres) on the Nepean River. Wentworth travelled to England in 1816 to study law and became an advocate for political reform in NSW. Together with Robert Wardell, Wentworth founded The Australian newspaper. After his father's death in 1827 William Charles gradually purchased land on Sydney Harbour which he combined to create his Vaucluse Estate. The estate included the land from the Macquarie Lighthouse on South Head to the eastern heights of Rose Bay, with the land currently known as Nielsen Park forming a part. The focal point of the estate was Vaucluse House that he built for his family. William and his wife Sarah had seven daughters and three sons.

=== The Greycliffe Estate ===
In 1847, one of William Charles Wentworth's daughters, Fanny Katherine Wentworth (1829–1893), married John Reeve, a wealthy pastoralist from Gippsland. In 1850 Reeve purchased 14 acres of the Vaucluse Estate fronting Shark Bay from his father-in-law. Reeve commissioned architect John Frederick Hilly to design a villa at Shark Bay which was completed in 1851 and called Greycliffe. The villa demonstrates the characteristics of the Rustic Gothic design through its steeply pitched roofs and its location in a picturesque landscape. The house was oriented to the harbour front, with a vast portion of cleared land opening views to the water. The building included a detached sandstone coach house with staff quarters in the attic. Another, smaller, building was also built at this time as an estate cottage which became known as the Gardener's Cottage. Also designed by Hilly, the cottage reflects a pattern book design as the basis of its planning. Is shown in early photographs to have been located near a substantial kitchen garden, with open paddocks surrounding. In 1854 the Reeves left for England and did not return. The house was then leased by a succession of distinguished persons including Lt. Col. J. G. N. Gibbes, Collector of Customs, Fitzwilliam Wentworth, Attorney General William Bede Dalley, Premier Sir John Robertson and Lady Isabella Martin. In February 1897, whilst the house was occupied by Fitzwilliam Wentworth, a very extensive fire damaged much of the house and its interior. Wentworth had it rebuilt largely to its original design but with some with alterations. By May 1898 Mary and Fitzwilliam Wentworth were once again occupying the house and continued to do so until it was resumed by the NSW Government. During the private ownership phase in the 19th and early 20th centuries the beachfront of Shark Bay remained in its natural state apart from a small change shed and piled swimming cage located at the eastern extent of the bay for the use of Greycliffe residents.

=== Defence ===
In 1870 part of the Greycliffe Estate was set aside for defence purposes. At this time Britain had withdrawn the last of its garrisons from Sydney and the government again ordered a serious re-evaluation of Sydney's Harbour defences. A Royal Commission into the defence of the Colony found that there was a need for coastal and Harbour defence and decided to build batteries at Middle Head, Georges Head, South Head, Bradley's Head, and Shark Point on Sydney Harbour. Shark Point, now known as Steele Point, was one of this system of artillery batteries at the entrance to Port Jackson. One acre, one rood and 10 perches at Steele Point was resumed at this time to build a battery. The battery, designed by James Barnet, is of sandstone construction and is made up of a series of gun pits with connecting trenches and tunnels. A timber cottage near to the portal entrance of the Battery was built in 1880 as a two-roomed Gunners' Barracks. A store shed, which was likely used for early storage of artillery, and later vehicle storage, was also built in the 1880s.

In 1942, 3.6 hectares (9 acres) of the broader site was occupied by the Army as Sydney Harbour's anti-aircraft defences. A light AA gun was placed at Steele Point, air raid shelters were built and the 61st Anti-Aircraft Searchlight Company (an all-women unit) occupied the area between the Gardeners Cottage and the avenue of small fig trees to its south. A brick emplacement was constructed at Bottle and Glass Point for use by volunteer 15–16-year-old boys of the Marine Bomb Spotting Squad.

=== Resumption and establishment of Nielsen Park ===
The Harbour Foreshores Vigilance Committee, with William Notting as secretary, formed in 1905 to secure parks on Harbour foreshores for public use. William Notting was a tireless campaigner against the alienation of Harbour foreshore lands and had been agitating for the resumption of land at Parsley Bay since 1900. Notting was a keen sailor who urged that "steps must be taken to prevent Sydney Harbour becoming a private lake, commenting that it is little better than a pond in a privately owned paddock". The Committee played a significant role in the emergence of a public movement to protect the remaining natural foreshores of the harbour. As a result, the Foreshore Resumptions Scheme was established in 1911 and Nielsen Park was created and named in honour of the Minister for Lands Mr. Niels R W Nielsen, the Secretary for Lands. The Hermitage Foreshore Reserve and Strickland House were also reclaimed at this time. The newly created Nielsen Park Reserve was a total of 51 acres of land and it included: Shark Beach, Bottle and Glass Point and the W C Wentworth Trustee's land around Mount Trefle as well as a parcel of land belonging to George Donaldson containing a house and stables at the summit of Mount Trefle.

Greycliffe was not included in the first resumption. The public praised the resumption of part of the foreshore but pressed for the acquisition of Greycliffe. In 1911, the Greycliffe Estate was resumed.

In 1914 Greycliffe House with a two-acre curtilage was added and dedicated for hospital purposes with its first role as the Lady Edeline Hospital for Babies. The Battery at Steele Point remained in Commonwealth of Australia ownership.

=== Management under the Nielsen Park Trust (1912–1967) ===
Care and control of Nielsen Park was entrusted to the Nielsen Park Trust who held their first meeting on 24 May 1912. The first committee members included E.M. deBurgh, the Chief Engineer for NSW Public Works for Harbours and Water Supply (President); James Macarthur-Onslow, the Member for Waverley; and Mr O'Keefe (Secretary and Treasurer). There were numerous structures constructed by the Trust between 1914 and 1965. Most of these structures, constructed by the NSW Government Architect's Office, were located along the foreshore, and some were constructed using labour from the Unemployed Relief Work Fund which employed builders during the Depression. The site became a popular picnicking area and the ferry wharf, built at the southern end of the beach in 1916, resulted in increased Park patronage.

Although resumed for a public reserve, swimming at Shark Beach was initially discouraged by the Trust due to the danger of shark attacks. A small sea wall and fence along the beachfront was provided in c. 1918. By 1930, to accommodate the increased patronage, the Trust decided to build the first triangular swimming enclosure. This was quickly replaced by a larger enclosure in 1931 with a central diving tower and fixed piled platforms and pontoons.

When the small sea wall and fence along the beachfront was provided in c. 1918 the upper level promenade was built named "Notting Parade". Along this, the W. A. Notting Memorial is sited immediately west of the Kiosk. The large curved masonry stuccoed Roman Seat was erected in 1927 by the Nielsen Park Trust, with a plaque honouring William Albert Notting, who was instrumental in having the reserve established through his involvement with the Harbour Foreshore Vigilance Committee. A second plaque at the western end of the memorial, honouring Niels Nielsen, was added in 1995.

The Park Kiosk dates from 1914 and was the first building commissioned by the newly formed Nielsen Park Reserve Trust to provide refreshment facilities for visitors, reflecting the new status of the park as a recreation ground. Its original form was an octagonally shaped pavilion and in c. 1925 wings were added each side. A small cottage and garage was built adjacent for the Kiosk lessee.

A men's dressing shed with stone turreted walls built in 1920 to the Government Architect's design. This structure adjoined an earlier timber and fibro shed sited on the beach. The new dressing sheds were opened on 21 October 1921 and in 1924 a Life Saving and Swimming Club was formed that used part of the original dressing shed. In 1931 the public works department undertook works to accommodate locker and toilet facilities for men in this building.

A small western toilet block was built in c. 1920 as a Ladies Toilet block, with rusticated sandstone walls. Another small toilet block, completed in 1965 was one of the last buildings to be constructed under the Trust administration. Built to a Government Architect design using stone walls but in a contemporary architectural idiom, it was discretely sited on the hill at the western end of the beach behind vegetation.

In 1932 the Dressing Pavilion was built. This single-storey building or enclosure was designed in a restrained Inter-war Mediterranean style, to provide change and shower facilities for paying visitors using the beach. It was designed to provide separated men's and women's toilets, lockers and changing spaces around two large courtyards. The building was constructed from cement rendered and painted brickwork walls, recessed externally and capped with narrow pitched terracotta tiled roofing on a timber framework. It provided the sole access way, via a tunnel, to the swimming enclosure which was then fenced off from the rest of the park, and thus allowed the Trust to charge visitors for swimming.

The Halbert Pavilion, located between Greycliffe house and the Kiosk was built by the Nielsen Park Trust as a picnicking pavilion. The structure had no windows and the sides were partially sheeted. The cut and filled grassed area, retained by a sandstone wall, was accessed by steps and a cement path from the access road.

Mt Trefle, the highest point in the Park, was named after the Hon. John Treflé, Secretary for Lands from 1912-1915. Treflé followed the Hon. N. R. W. Nielsen who had been Secretary in the McGowen Government from 1910 and 1911. It is a sandstone outcrop with evidence of a basalt dyke extending from Mount Trefle down to the Bottle and Glass Point. Prior to the period of public ownership, a quarry was in use on its eastern side. In the early management by the Trust revenue was generated from the agistment of horses on cleared land on the northern slopes of Mount Trefle towards the rear of Greycliffe. The management of the Park was altered in 1950 when it was combined with Vaucluse Park to become Nielsen-Vaucluse Trust. This Trust management the park for another 17 years until it was transferred to the care of NPWS in 1967.

Several early Trust-era structures including a rotunda, dressing sheds, swimming enclosures and the ferry wharf were gradually removed across the period for a wide range of reasons including weather events and changing requirements of the site. Greycliffe House was located on a separate lot and was not included in Nielsen Park until 1970. The Sydney Harbour National Park was established in 1975 and Nielsen Park was included a few years later.

=== Infant Care ===
The NSW Ministry of Health established the Lady Edeline Hospital for Babies in Greycliffe house in 1914 under the direction of the Baby Clinics, Pre-Maternity and Home Nursing Board, mainly to treat gastroenteritis. The harbourside location and fresh air were considered optimal for the recovery process. The facility was named for Lady Edeline Strickland (née Sackville), who championed the cause of infant care. It was only the second hospital established in Australia specifically for infants under the age of two years.

Greycliffe House was altered and added to during the 1920s for hospital purposes, including enclosing the house's northeast verandah, construction of large timber-framed verandah on the north, construction of a single storey room at the east end of the stables block and construction of a small enclosure and toilet on the south of the house. Greycliffe's interior was also adapted but documentary records to date do not evidence these changes. Documents record that in 1923 the hospital was housing 35 patients, 13 nursing staff and 10 household staff.

As improved health and hygiene standards lead to a decline in infant mortality the Lady Edeline Hospital for Babies was closed in 1934. At this time the Tresillian Mothercraft Training School was established at Greycliffe House to provide training for nurses and a place where mothers could learn appropriate care for their babies. It was the third Tresillian facility established.

In 1939 a new building, Margaret Harper House, was built behind Greycliffe to service the Tresilian Facility. It features a series of enclosed verandahs around a courtyard and was originally linked to Greycliffe House. The building is named for eminent paediatrician Dr Margaret Harper, whose work on infant diet, care and disease has remained highly influential.

Tresillian tailored and altered the house during their 33-year occupancy including subdividing the larger rooms for accommodation, toilets and storage. Measured plans were prepared in the 1950s identifying the rooms and their uses. In particular, a single storey extension, housing a nursery, was added in 1939 between Margaret Harper House and Greycliffe, which involved demolition and alteration to previous work. The architect added a rotunda to this suite of rooms. A toddlers' room was constructed in 1953 on the north east corner of the enclosed verandah and Margaret Harper House was constructed to the east in 1939. The garden to the north of Greycliffe was well used by the Tresillian patients and staff. During the 1930s, Matron Kaibel, who resided at the site for 23 years, established a sunken garden to the northeast of Greycliffe with associated paths and plantings. The facility closed its doors on 10 October 1968. The property was added to the lands to be administered by NPWS on 4 May 1970.

Under National Parks stewardship, Greycliffe was repaired and restored to its nineteenth-century layout. The Lady Edeline and Tresillian external additions were removed, in particular, the additions attached to the north and east of the former stables. Some of the internal features relating to the Lady Edeline and Tresillian phases were retained. The upper floor of the stables had not been not altered and still retains its mid-nineteenth-century plan. In 2002 the gardens around Greycliffe were reconstructed.

=== Management by NSW National Parks and Wildlife Service (1967–present) ===
When the NPWS assumed management of Nielsen Park in 1968 they set about making the Park more open and focused on both public recreation and protection of the natural environment. Fencing on the beach was removed, free access was given to the swimming enclosure and the Dressing Pavilion, car parking was banned and two picnic shelters were removed. The wharf was demolished in 1979 along with swimming platforms, pontoons and a diving tower. Women's change sheds near the wharf were removed as were fireplaces at Vaucluse Point. At this point, Greycliffe House became the new administration centre for the Sydney District of NPWS.

In 1989 a new steel framed workshop and compound was built in the old quarry site behind Mount Trefle.

Throughout the 1970s various restoration works were undertaken to Greycliffe House, the Gardener's Cottage and Steele Point Cottage along with urgent repairs to the kiosk after a severe storm in the 1980s. The NPWS management of Nielsen Park has contributed to the enhancement of the natural environment with the restoration of cleared areas of the park, regeneration and recovery of the Nielsen Park She-Oak population.

Nielsen Park continues to be a popular venue for beach-side recreation and family picnics. The Park is becoming increasingly popular as a venue to celebrate Christmas Day and to watch the start of the annual Sydney to Hobart Yacht Race.

== Gallery ==
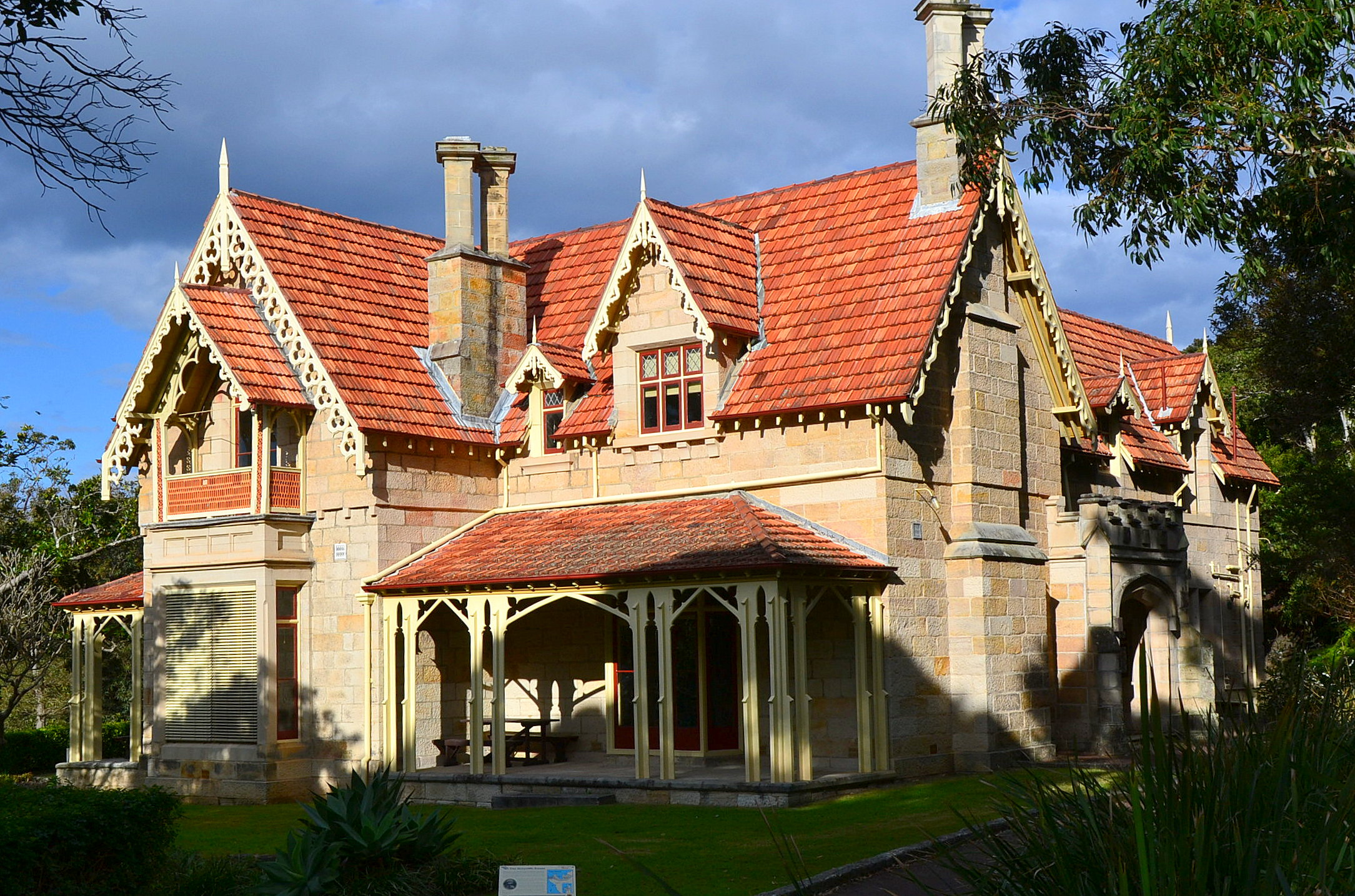
Greycliffe House

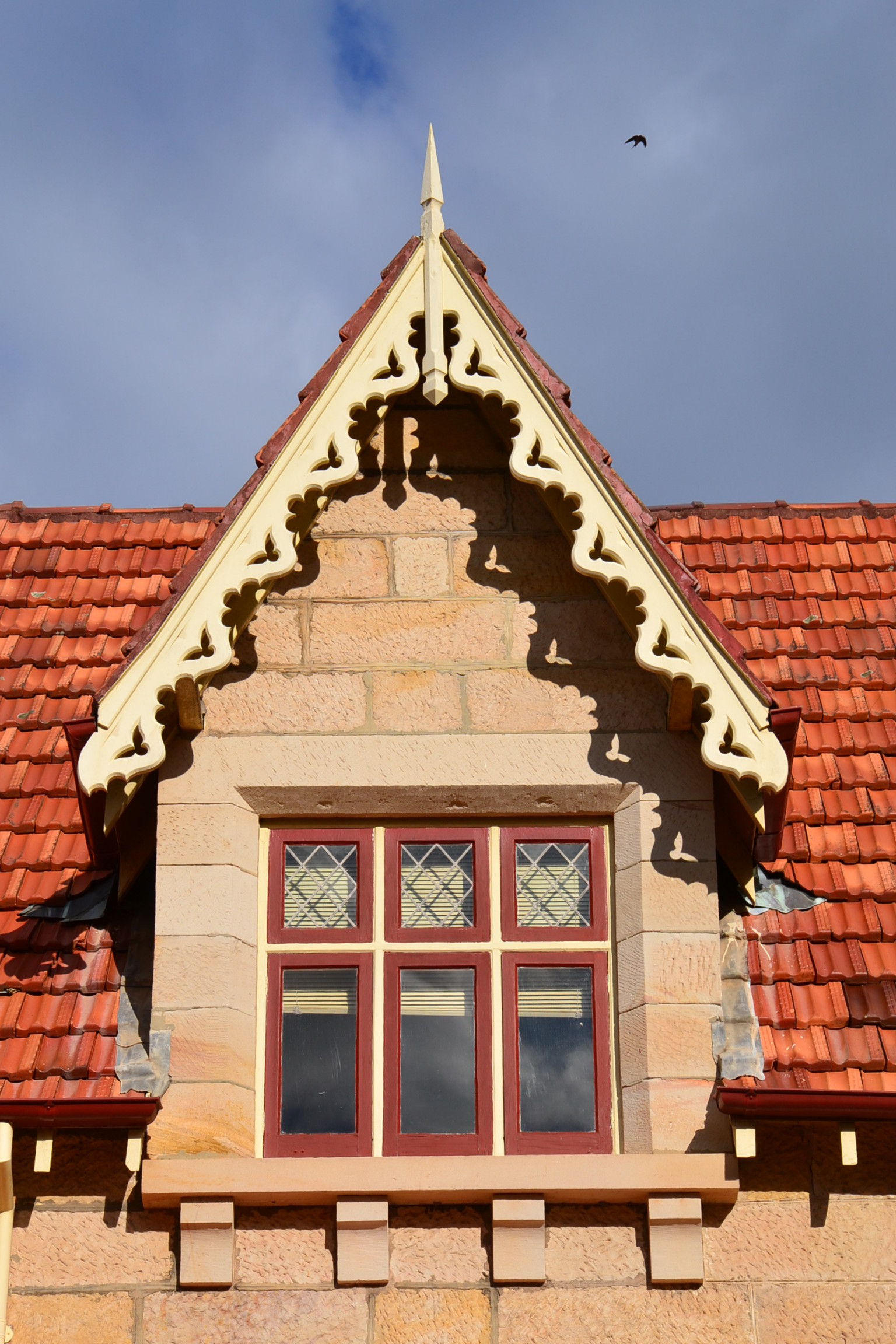
Greycliffe House, Gothic detailing

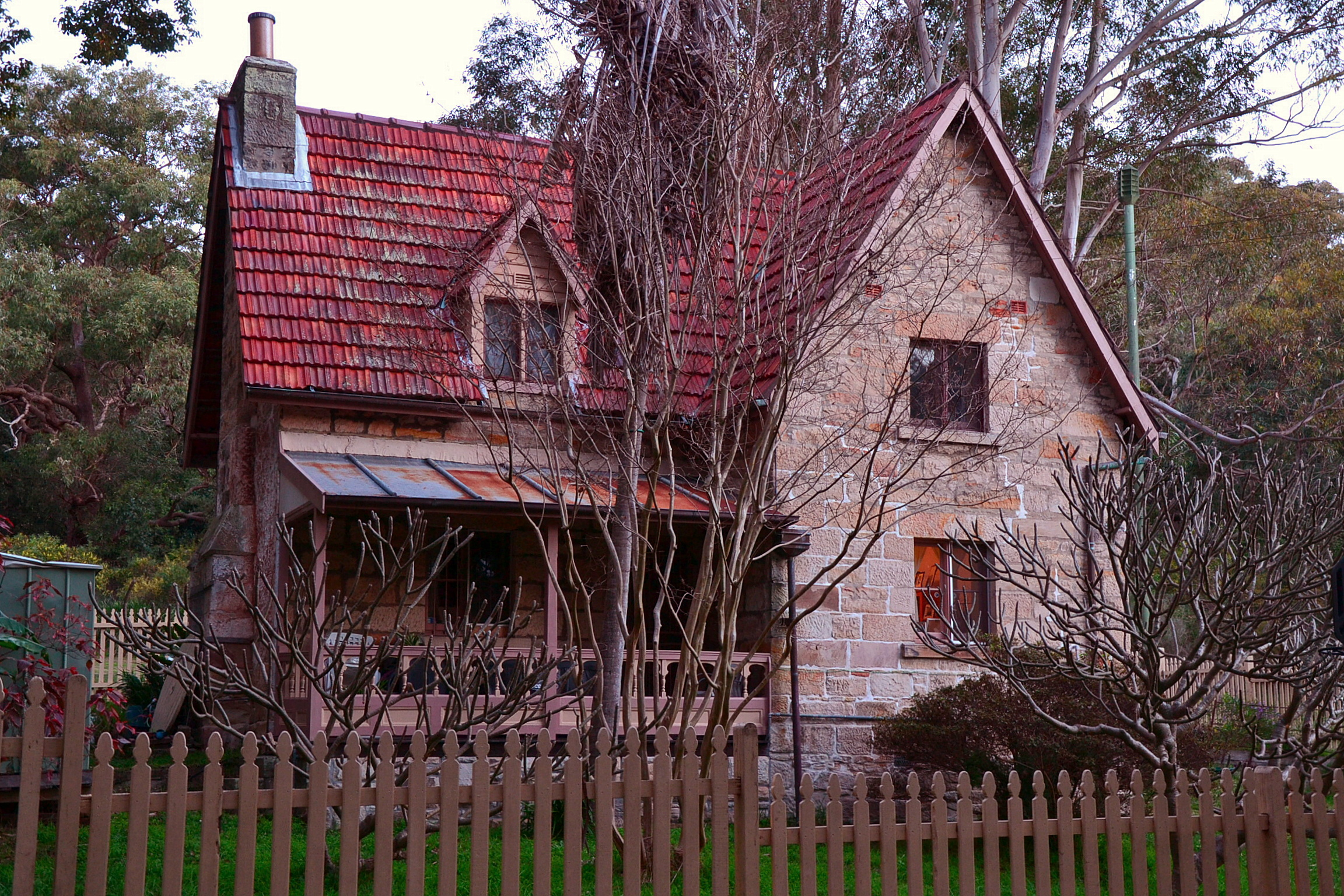
Gardener's cottage

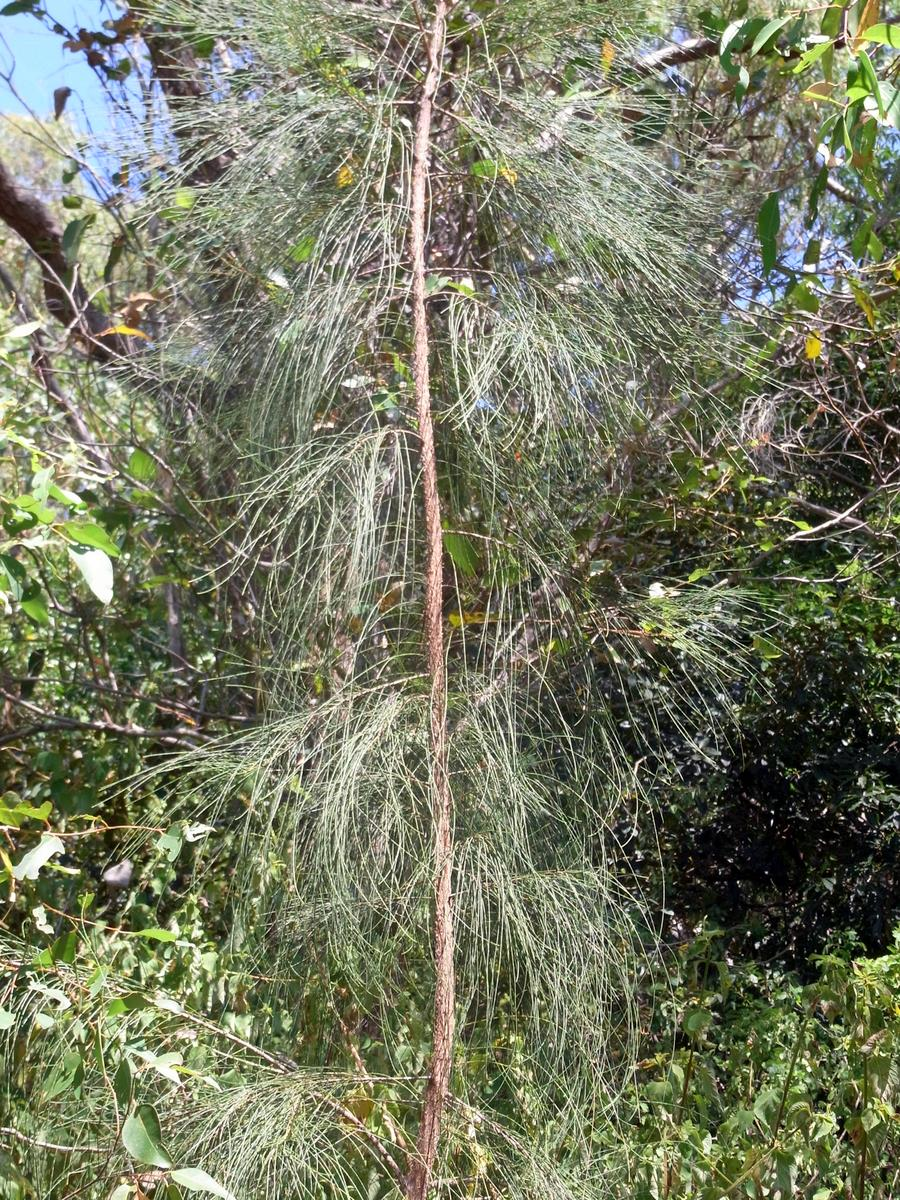
Cultivated she-oak at Nielsen Park

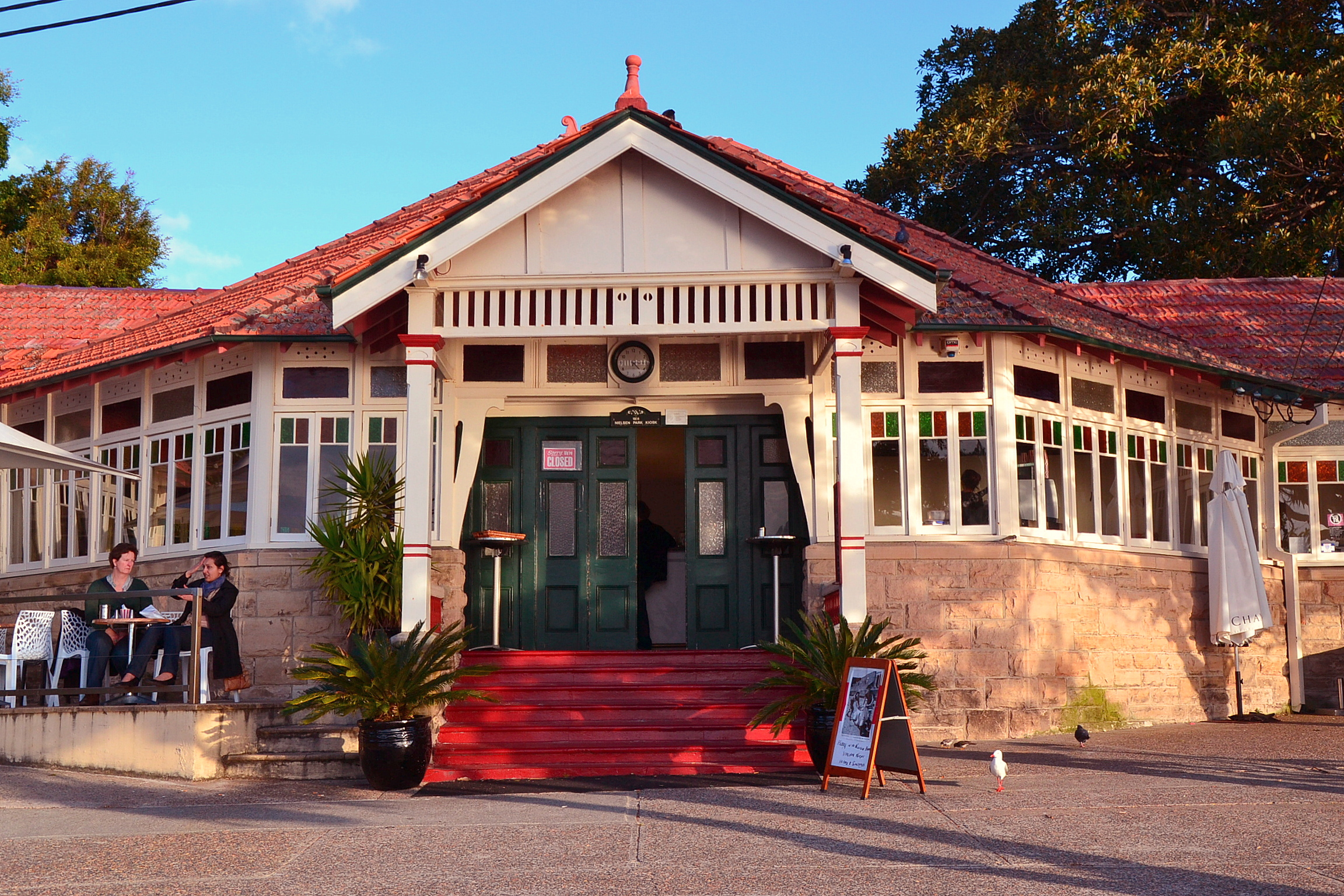
Federation-style kiosk

== Description ==
Nielsen Park is a highly modified landscape that reflects three phases of occupation: pre-settlement landscape; a modified landscape seen as both a natural and planned picturesque landscape around Greycliffe House; and a public landscape for recreation that includes a number of support structures. In addition, the Steel Point fortifications add a further layer to the use and appearance of the park. Nielsen Park has had its pre-settlement landscape dramatically altered by extensive clearing and modifying of landforms and vegetation but also by replanting and regenerating a form of natural bushland on parts of the site. This has resulted in recent years of the overall impression that areas of the landscape appear similar to that which existed prior to European settlement. However, the areas of native vegetation that now exist do not reflect the form of the historic native landscape. The shift to regenerating native landscape has taken place during the NPWS management of the site and contrasts to the Trust management that focused on the recreational aspects of the place. In its current form, the Park does not reflect any of the specific periods of use in its overall landscape setting but rather a combination of regenerated native landscape, modified garden landscape related to the house and very modified park landscape related to the recreational uses. The landscape is also modified by the buildings that have been constructed and that are viewed as part of the now largely picturesque landscape. These buildings are mostly of a small scale and were sensitively designed to be viewed as components of a picturesque setting.

=== Natural vegetation ===
As is common in all coastal and estuarine areas of the Sydney Region, the Park contains many rock outcrops, particularly along the foreshore headlands. These are given some added interest by the remnants of the effect of a basalt dyke that runs from Mount Trefle to Bottle and Glass Point resulting in the unusually formed rock formations still visible. The native vegetation consists of tall heath along the western foreshore containing Allocasuarina portuensis, smooth-barked apple and Port Jackson figs associated with the various exposed sandstone outcrops. In the northern and eastern slopes of the hill formations exist also tick bush, tea tree, she-oak, bushy needlewood, Banksia and pockets of smooth-barked apple trees. In the lower slopes and flat areas there are stands of Sydney peppermint, red bloodwood and some Port Jackson figs. Low-level vegetation also contains sweet pittosporum, cheese tree, blueberry ash and a ground cover of kangaroo vine. Introduced Plantings and Modifications to Land Form Apart from the introduced lower grassed areas, other newer introduced tree plantings include tuckeroos, brush box and Moreton Bay figs. Plantings include those along Notting Parade and around the W. A. Notting Memorial, the Hill Fig Avenue, tree plantings adjacent to the cottage and the brush box tree boundary planting along Greycliffe Avenue and Vaucluse Road. The introduced plantings originally related to the original layout of Greycliffe House and then later to the establishment of the Trust and public recreation. These two uses can be understood from the landscape plantings. In its earlier known state the Park was bisected by a small watercourse known as Shark Creek which flowed into a lagoon behind Shark Beach that drained into the harbour at the north end of the beach. This system has now been replaced by a series of large diameter pre-cast concrete pipes with grassed areas extending over the former creek. It is likely that the land around this creek would have been heavily timbered with dense undergrowth which would have thinned out at the higher elevations.

The landscape modifications can be summarised as:

- cut and filled platform for Greycliffe.
- cut and filled roadway entry drive to Greycliffe.
- excavation and landfill for Steel Point Battery group.
- modifications to beachfront for concrete promenade.
- infilling the creek and presumably changing the levels around it to create the current lawn area.
- levelling for car parking in various areas around the park.
- the Mt Trefle Quarry.
- cut and fill for the Notting Memorial.
- filling the swamp behind the beach (site of dressing pavilion).
- minor changes for paths and minor works around the site.

The Park has been separated into landscape management zones (see Appendix 3, Conservation Management Plan, 2014). These include:

1. Natural Zone – This consists mainly of the revegetated Mount Trefle and its western slopes and includes most of the heavily wooded indigenous plantings. It also includes Bottle and Glass Point to the north and the steep and dense scrublands above the western shore area.
2. Parkland Zone – This includes all of the grassed lower areas, the beachfront and the slopes up to Greycliffe House (but not the garden). It contains most of the large lawn areas, introduced trees and paving, and many of the buildings on the site.
3. Greycliffe Garden Zone – This small zone includes the remnant gardens of "Greycliffe House" and those adjacent to the Margaret Harper Wing which incorporates a parterre garden.
4. Military Zone – This consists of Steele Point and contains the above ground and subterranean remains of the Battery and its associated buildings. It is noted that military activity at times included a number of sites in the Park.
5. Utility Zone – This includes the NPWS workshop situated in the old stone quarry near the entrance of the original access road from Vaucluse Road.

=== Aboriginal sites ===
The site, with its accessible location, fresh water supply and wealth of resources constitutes an Aboriginal cultural landscape. Extensive archaeological evidence at Nielsen Park demonstrates use of the land for camping and fishing over an extended period. There are 14 recorded Aboriginal sites within the park. These sites are comprised within:

- A small cavity in the base of sandstone escarpment at the north-eastern end of Shark Beach. Two red ochre positive hand stencils are located on the rear wall of the stone cavity. The hands (both left and right) are approximately 15 centimetres (5.9 in) wide and 14 centimetres (5.5 in) long. No archaeological deposits are present within the site. The cavity floor is sandstone.
- A small sandstone overhang on an upper terrace of a sandstone escarpment at the north-eastern end of Shark Beach (photo to left shows site location). The overhang is approximately 6.6 metres (22 ft) long, 1.4 metres (4 ft 7 in) high and 2.6 metres (8 ft 6 in) wide. The site is approximately 15 metres (49 ft) above sea level. One white ochre negative hand stencil is located on the rear wall of the shelter. Only one left hand is present, no other art was identified. A thin residual midden deposit covers the shelter floor. The deposit contains the remains of a variety of shellfish species, dominated by rock oyster, mud whelk, and cockle. Charcoal and pieces of quartz (probable stone artefacts) are also included within the deposit.
- Residual midden deposits scattered in patches across Bottle and Glass Point. The midden deposits form a more or less continuous site across the point and southern side of the point in areas where the land slopes gradually to the shoreline and original soils have been retained.
- Large north-east facing shelter on Steel Point approx. 3 metres (9.8 ft) above waterline, located 30 metres (98 ft) north-west of western end of Shark Beach. Access is along shoreline. The shelter is 10–15 metres (33–49 ft) long, 6 metres (20 ft) wide and 6 metres (20 ft) high.
- Small west-facing rock-overhang on upper escarpment of Mt Trefle. The site is located above a clearing adjacent to the Nielsen Park access road. Rock shelter is 7.5 metres (25 ft) long, 1.5 metres (4 ft 11 in) deep and 1.36 metres (4 ft 6 in) high.
- Large west-facing shelter approximately 20 metres (66 ft) north of the first Mt Trefle site. The shelter is approximately 7 metres (23 ft) long, 3.5 metres (11 ft) wide and 1.5 metres (4 ft 11 in) high. The shelter includes a relatively dense shell midden deposit on the shelter floor including a variety of shellfish species including rock oyster, turban, hairy mussel, limpet and nerita.

=== Greycliffe House ===
Greycliffe House is a two-storey "Marine Villa" of sandstone construction with steeply sloped gabled roof covered with Marseilles pattern terracotta tiles, the roof originally was timber shingled. It was designed in the Victorian Gothic Revival manner by architect J. F. Hilly for the owner John Reeve and completed in 1851. Hilly probably based his scheme on a pattern book design as he did for many other similar houses at that time. The result is very picturesque, well suited to its woodland harbourside and hillside setting. As viewed from the harbour it is very similar to its original appearance although its original design intent has been somewhat altered by later alterations and additions at its rear. The original design consisted of a two-storey villa for the main living quarters with bedrooms above and a single storey kitchen and scullery at the rear. Nearby was a detached attic storey sandstone coach house and stables with staff quarters above. This arrangement is clearly shown on a c. 1860 map of the area with the house served by the present access road. This plan also shows the fencing that separated the property from the rest of the Vaucluse estate and the adjoining Carrara estate. Following a major fire in 1897 that severely damaged the house, it was rebuilt and was altered and added to providing more staff accommodation. The owner, Fitzwilliam Wentworth, added another storey to the kitchen wing in a similar style to the main house. During its conversion after 1914 for hospital use numerous small alterations and additions were made, some of which remain. However, NPWS commenced a restoration process for the house to remove the Tresillian period changes in the main part of the house and the formal northern elevations and restore the 19th Century layout and details. Hilly's design for the House conforms to the "picturesque" philosophy of landscape design common in large contemporary estates. A noted horticulturist of the time, Thomas Shepherd, held that in such a style the lawn should be bold and sweeping, and enclosed on both sides by groups of trees, leaving an open park in front of the house. The early landscape layout of Greycliffe appeared to have been influenced by this philosophy; the sandstone outcrops and harbourside location were almost made-to-measure natural elements enhancing the "picturesque." Subsequent development of the landscape and curtilage of the House barely progressed beyond sporadic plantings and clearing; this state of affairs was consistent with the continuous leasing of the House for almost the first fifty years. The garden setting today is little changed from early images.

=== The Gardener's Cottage ===
This small sandstone cottage with terracotta tiled roof (as did Greycliffe) was probably also built in 1851 for John Reeve to a design by J. F. Hilly in the picturesque Victorian Gothic Revival style. He appears to have used a pattern book design for the basis of the planning as it is very similar to standard designs available for "two farm labourers" in separate dwellings within the one building. It is likely that the building was used for two dwellings as there is evidence of a second staircase providing for access to a bedroom from each of the two ground floor rooms but as early as 1857 it was referred to as the Gardeners' Cottage'. As there was an early connecting road to Vaucluse House past the cottage it is possible, as it is sited right on the boundary of the two properties, that it may have been intended as a combined gate lodge and worker's cottage. Changes to the cottage appear to have been made after 1911 when the Trust took control. A rear verandah was added in 1912 and the bathroom annexe (to the side and now demolished) was added in 1923 when the sewer was connected. When the NPWS assumed control after 1968 further improvements were made including the upgrading and installation of the kitchen on the rear veranda, the demolition of the garage, bathroom annex and rear skillion and the reconstruction of the current rear addition. It also appears that the cottage was used in association with fruit and vegetable gardens for the estate as these are shown fenced and adjoining the cottage, and afterwards in Trust and NPWS ownership it has served as quarters for park rangers. Despite various works having been undertaken, the building is in quite poor condition and requires substantial upgrade. In particular drainage around the building and termites are causing substantial damage.

=== The Margaret Harper Wing ===
Built in 1939 as a hospital wing for Greycliffe in its role as a Tresillian House it was designed by architect Gilbert Hughes to provide private ward accommodation for nursing mothers and student nursing staff. The asymmetrical planned building of rendered brickwork with gabled terracotta tiled roof reflects the character of Greycliffe and was originally physically connected. The design has been referred to as being in the Interwar Mediterranean style however its Tudor Gothic Revival roof, chimneys and wall details with its colonial Georgian windows and Spanish colonial arcades possibly suggest the emphasis may be towards Neo Colonial Gothic Revival style. The NPWS has carried out some alterations and removed some internal walls to improve living areas for its use as a residence. Some significant moveable heritage is associated with the Tresillian period of occupation of the site including a number of baby bassinets. From time to time birth and health certificates are also donated to PWG by people who were admitted to the centre. These are held on site.

=== The Steel Point Precinct ===
The battery, dating from 1871 is of sandstone construction, at least half being below ground level and roofed with sandstone slabs. The construction was "cut and fill" with spoil being used to mound around the emplacements so that they were not visible from the harbour. The two northern gun pits and connecting trenches are open but the one southern gun pit is filled with sand and has been turfed over. The fortification also consists of a north-south tunnel with a western branch down a stairway to the original magazine. A small room, probably intended as a "stand to" area for gunners is situated at the north end of the tunnel wall. At the south, the tunnel branches southeasterly to a stair connecting to the filled gun pit and westerly to a tunnel portal recently re-opened that led to the barracks. At various places both above and below ground are original cast and wrought iron fittings either built into the stonework as hooks or loose items having been partly dismantled from their original form. There are also other parts of surviving fittings such as timber door frames, glazed brick vents, brass fixings, terracotta pipe drains and traces of white lime wash to walls and some black stencilled lettering. In at least two places, steel roof props have been fitted to prevent collapse but otherwise the structure appears to be in good condition and largely intact. The fortification is mostly located on Park land, although a section of tunnel is under the land occupied for the degaussing station and is not under park control. The site of the guns provided extensive views to the harbour however regrowth of the surrounding bushland has obscured the setting from the installation.

=== Steel Point Cottage ===
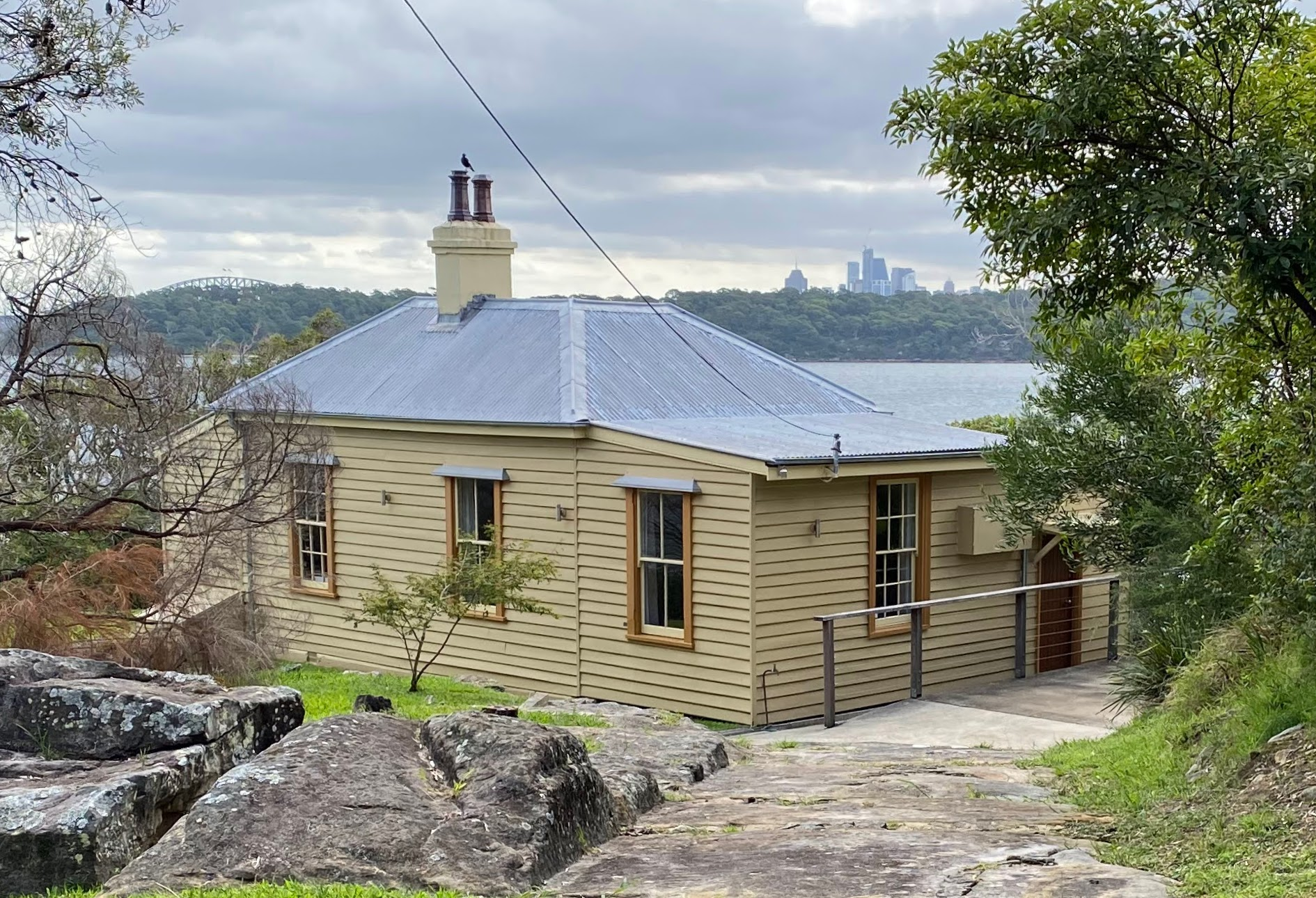
Steele Point Cottage

The cottage is a single storey timber-framed structure clad externally with weather boards with a hipped corrugated steel roof. It was originally built in 1880 as a two roomed barracks for the Gunners as this was probably sufficient for a normal detachment at any one time attached to the fort. The two skillion roofed additions to the north and south were probably added in the early 20th century, most likely to make the building more suitable as quarters for the District Gunner. A verandah was added in 1930 by the Trust and it was later enclosed to form a room. Despite these changes and some inconsequential awning additions, the building retains most of its original details including doors, windows, fireplaces and chimney. Significant conservation and restoration works were undertaken in 2006 and the building is now used for short term holiday accommodation.

=== The Store Shed ===
This timber-framed structure, associated with Steel Point Cottage, has a gabled roof and the walls and roof are clad with corrugated iron, some wall sheets having the "Gospel Oak" brand visible indicating probable 19th century derivation and fragments of military use building fabric such as traces of pitch on the concrete floor. The building had two sets of double doors presumably to house two wagons but one of these bays is enclosed and a window fitted. A later timber trellis has been added at the north side. Conservation and restoration works have been completed in conjunction with the works to the cottage. The building is in good condition.

=== Kiosk, Cottage and Garage Group ===
The single storey pavilion kiosk is of timber-framed construction set on a rusticated sandstone spandrel up to window sill height interrupted in two locations by doorways accessed by sandstone flights of steps. The main and central entrance is marked by a decorative timber-gabled porch in the Edwardian style complementing the Federation period style of the building. The hipped roof is clad with Marseilles pattern unglazed terracotta tiles with finials at ridge junctions. Internally, the north area has a raised timber floor while the south kiosk has a painted cement paved floor and part-raised timber floor. The vaulted ceiling expresses the original octagonal "tent" form, which is extended north and south over the additions and the ceiling follows the roof line and is panelled with timber boarding. Doors are panelled in the Edwardian style and the windows consist of clear glass lower panes and multi-coloured small glazed panes at the top suggesting the 1920s period. This design, coupled with the rear room having windows and a stuccoed masonry wall, suggests that when originally built the kiosk was open at the sides or had a form of opening screens for day use. The rear of the building has a series of kitchen and store spaces with tiled and skillion roofing above panelled timber or rendered brick walls. These are now connected to the originally detached small cottage as an office for the kiosk manager. This weatherboard cottage also has a tiled roof and it has been extended at its southern side in recent years up to a courtyard wall that encloses a small service area at the south side of the kiosk. Its main architectural feature is its decorative veranda balustrade. The building has been conserved and upgraded and is in good condition.

=== Western Toilet Block ===
This small toilet block originally built in c. 1920 as a Ladies Toilet block has rusticated sandstone walls and is relieved by small glass louvered window openings and screen entrance walls at each end. The hipped terracotta tiled roof was originally of gambrel form, while internally it has been partitioned to create a Gents Toilet at its southern end. At the same time during the initial period of NPWS control a shower was installed, some toilets replaced with benches and cubicle doors replaced. The building is to be in good condition.

=== Dressing Pavilion ===
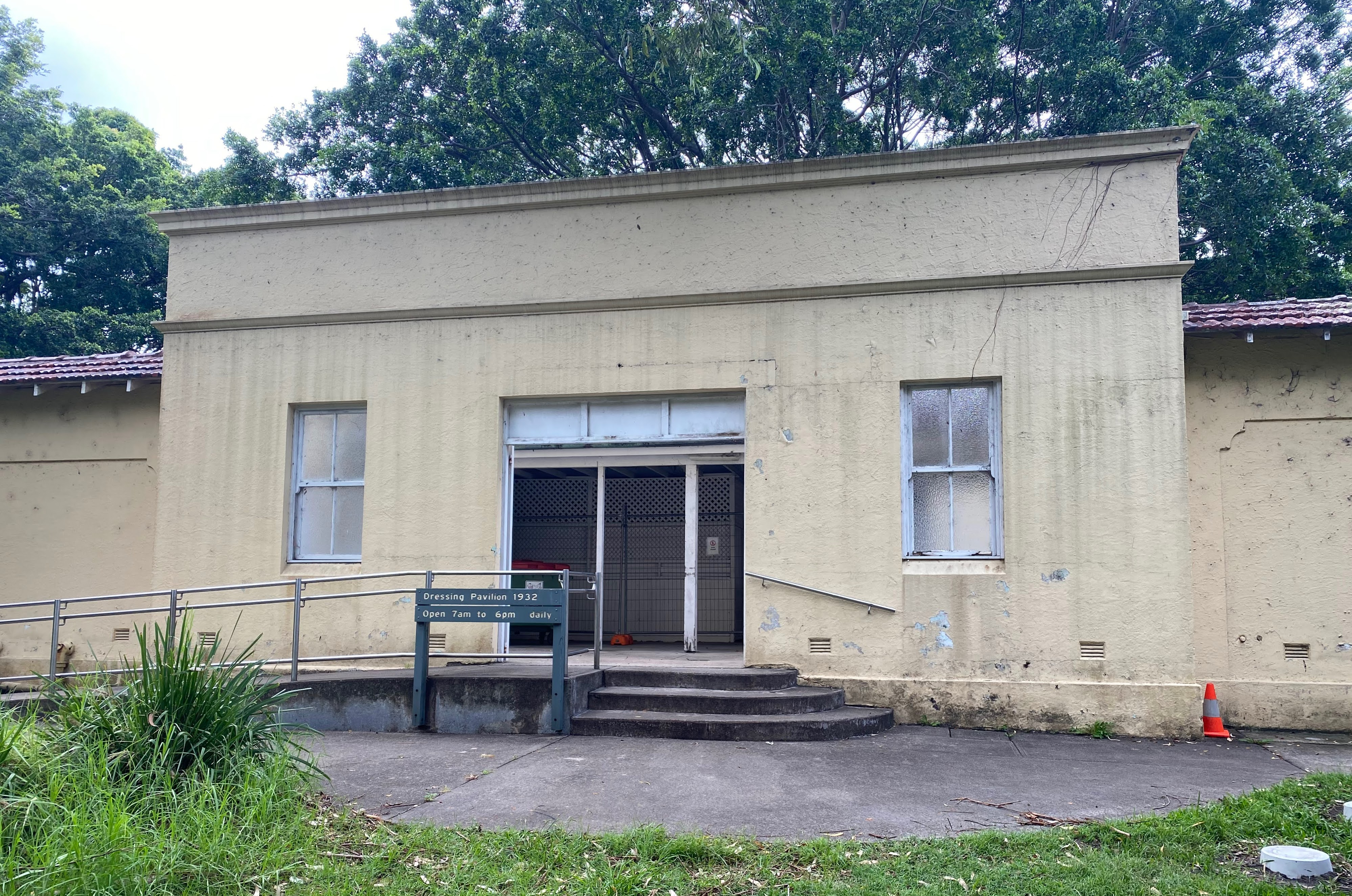
The Dressing Pavilion

This is a single storey building or enclosure, dating from 1932, designed in a restrained Inter-war Mediterranean style popular in the 1930s, to provide change and shower facilities for paying visitors using the beach. It was designed to provide separated men's and women's toilets, lockers and changing spaces around two large courtyards. Between the two courtyard wings is a central entrance court with an administration area. The building is constructed from cement rendered and painted brickwork walls, recessed externally and capped with narrow pitched terracotta tiled roofing on a timber framework. Additional amenity was provided by free-standing shelters in the courtyards. The central access area provided entry, from the rear of the building, where patrons paid for use of the beach. This led to a semi-circular area between the pavilion and the promenade before leading through a pedestrian tunnel under Notting Parade onto Shark Beach. This arrangement was developed due to the prevailing social attitude that changing clothes could not be done on the beach and as the beach was fenced off from the public and admission charged. Extended daily access was made possible by wearing strips of colour-coded wool. In 2002-2003 structural and restoration works were carried out within the Dressing Pavilion and in 2004, the tunnel linking the Pavilion with the beach, running beneath Notting Parade, was restored and re-opened. The building is now in very good condition and use of the Pavilion has been revitalised.

=== W. A. Notting Memorial ===
The memorial is in the form of a semi-circular Roman Seat, set into the hillside, looking out across the harbour. It has bronze plaques at each end and a continuous seat with a low wall behind. The memorial forms a landscape focal point to the western end of the reserve and is given added visual importance by being elevated on a podium above Notting Parade. It is accessed by two low flights of concrete steps. The memorial is finished in unpainted cement render and given interest by classically inspired capping mouldings. The structure is as originally built and is in good condition.

=== Halbert Pavilion ===
This is a single storey former picnic pavilion built in 1958. It is timber-framed structure built on a rusticated sandstone foundation wall. The walls above are lined with vertically placed corrugated galvanised "ripple iron" sheets. The gabled roof is covered with terracotta tiles. In the 1997 adaptive re-use project to convert it to a function room, clear glass windows were installed replacing the original timber lattice screens. In 2007, further works were undertaken including the construction of a deck and doors.

=== Beachfront ===
To supplement the installation of the initial beach swimming enclosure, around 1930 the Trust built a large concrete beach wall and terrace for the full length of the beach. This replaced a grassed bank that had been part of a formal landscaped setting provided by the Trust around 1916. This work resulted in the low-lying land beyond, into which the creek discharged being filled and the area being suitable for the construction of the dressing pavilion. The present structure is in the form of a high retaining wall, behind which are areas of mown lawns abutting the Notting Parade pedestrian and service vehicle road. A concrete walkway follows the base of the wall along the beach and below are three large terraced steps which also serve as seating levels. Reinforcing the formal beach backdrop is a flight of steps from the top level onto the beach and symmetrically aligned on the centre of the kiosk. Other smaller stair flights between the upper and lower walkways have been recently fitted with stainless steel handrails. In 2003, the northeastern end of the concrete terrace was rebuilt with smaller steps with a new wider connecting path to Notting Parade. Elsewhere the beachfront wall and terraces are in fair to poor condition and reflect the numerous repairs made over the years to stabilise the structure in the face of the harsh waterfront environment. The shark-proof netted enclosure of semi-circular form is suspended on braided stainless steel cable attached to timber and concrete encased piles extending 75 metres from the beach. It extends for almost the full length of the beach. The net is removed each winter and stored in the Dressing Pavilion.

=== Former Surf Life Saving Club and Toilet ===
This former swimming and lifesaving club building with male toilet is incorporated into one of the two buildings in this precinct at the northeastern part of the beach and park. Dating from 1920, the building is in two sections. One is a rusticated sandstone walled building with a sandstone parapet containing toilets, former shower and dressing room and boatshed facing the Park. The other section, added 1948–1964, is constructed of timber framing accommodating the former SLS clubrooms. The male toilet area is largely in its original state while an adjoining store was converted in recent years into a disabled toilet. In 2003, the metal skillion roofing was extensively repaired as was the rear timber framed walling. To combat a severe stone exfoliation problem adjacent to the beach in 2003 a poultice was applied to the lower level of the wall to draw out the damaging salt composition build up on the wall. The north end of the SLSC section was refitted in late 2003 as a kiosk, when repairs were carried out including re-painting internally. This part contains an open deck supported in timber posts over the beach and includes a timber-floored room. All roofing is of skillion low-pitched profile while internally the concrete floors are either tiled or painted cement paving. Wall and ceiling linings to the timber-framed areas are generally of painted hardboard. The building is generally in good condition.

=== The Ladies' Toilet Block ===
Dating from 1965, the Ladies' Toilet Block is the last building to be constructed in the park except for the NPWS workshop near Mount Trefle. It has been sensitively sited and is well screened from view by careful tree and shrub plantings. The ladies' toilet has a standard toilet interior, covered by a steep mono-pitched corrugated steel roof. It is in good condition. It is accessed by a stair and concrete path leading off Notting Parade close to the Park entrance.

=== Bottle and glass precinct ===
Rock formations and steep cliff faces dominate the north and west sides of the point. A low hill comprising a sandstone outcrop provides a dramatic anchor for the Port Jackson figs growing over it on the southern side. Other vegetation growing around the base of the hill includes Red Bloodwoods, while tick bush (Kunzea ambigua) and Ball Honey Myrtle (Melaleuca nodosa) occurs on the summit. A road winds around the hill variously enclosed by trees and exposed sandstone until it reaches the mown grass areas on the northern side, giving panoramas of the harbour.

=== Non-contributory Items ===
There are numerous structures which, due to their sympathetic siting and design, do not detract from the significance of the site, but are not significant in and of themselves. Such structures include the fabric of the current swimming enclosure, Sydney Water sewage pumping stations, service buildings such as the Mount Trefle workshops and visitor facilities including toilets, information shelters, BBQs, picnic shelters, signage, car parks, walking tracks, fencing, bollards, tree guards, service roads and road barriers.

=== Rare flora and fauna ===
The last mainland eastern quoll specimen was collected as roadkill at Nielsen Park on 31 January 1963.

The rare Nielsen Park she-oak was originally identified here in 1986 from ten specimens. Those original plants have since died. However, efforts to propagate and reintroduce the species began from the time it was identified, and plants were planted at several locations around Nielsen Park and nearby Gap Bluff and Hermit Point. Fifty-four of these remained alive in 2000.

== Heritage listing ==
As at 13 December 2016, Nielsen Park is of state heritage significance as an outstanding natural and cultural landscape. The item demonstrates a rich and diverse range of uses spanning pre-European settlement to the present. The presence of Aboriginal art, shelters and middens across the site demonstrates pre-colonial use of the place as a fishing and camping ground for the local Aboriginal people and signifies the ongoing connection of the place to the Birrabirragal People.

Its use as a private residential estate by noted colonial family of William Wentworth is demonstrated by Greycliffe House, its surviving outbuildings, landscaped setting and historic harbour view lines which are rare in consideration of their intactness. Greycliffe House is an outstanding example of John F. Hilly's architectural design and is one of a suite of neighbouring Hilly residences in the immediate vicinity including Strickland House.

Use of Greycliffe House as a health facility for infants and babies, firstly as Lady Edeline Hospital for Babies from 1914-1934, and, later, as the Tresillian Mothercraft Training School from 1934-1968 is of historic significance. The history of these institutions exhibit the evolution of philosophies and methods of treating infant patients and their mothers which can be demonstrated in the various alterations and additions to the buildings and landscape from this period. Works such as Margaret Harper House (1939), and the parterre garden, designed by long-serving matron, Matron Kaibel, in the 1930s, contribute to the layering of significance in the setting.

The park is also historically significant in its several phases of use for defensive activities. The Steele Point fortification complex is representative of a group of 1870s harbour side fortifications. Steele Point Battery and its associated outbuildings, together with the potential archaeological deposits relating to use of the site in two world wars demonstrates the strategic importance of the location to Australia's defence forces since the 1870s.

The park has historical values at a state level for its ability to demonstrate the rise of harbour side recreational activity in the 20th century. It was one of the first major recreational reserves created along the southern shore of Sydney Harbour, instigated by a large public push to secure foreshore land in public ownership. Shark Bay, bordered by the current swimming enclosure, together with structures including the kiosk, bathing pavilion and promenade demonstrates the growth in popularity and evolving trends in public bathing and recreational activities.

The historical significance of Nielsen Park across its various phases of use is enhanced through association with a number of notable colonial figures, including William Wentworth, author, barrister, landowner, and statesman; the Reeve family who built the Greycliffe estate and, with noted mid-19th century architect and surveyor, John F. Hilly who designed Greycliffe and its outbuildings. It is also associated with William Notting, Secretary of the Harbour Foreshores Vigilance Committee and Park Trustee, who led the public move to have the area preserved and with Secretary of Lands at the time and Niels Nielsen who provided government support for the establishment of the park. The later use of Greycliffe as an Infant Hospital saw a close association with eminent paediatrician Dr Margaret Harper, whose work on infant diet, care and disease has remained highly influential.

The site demonstrates multiple layers of significance including native bushland, rich Aboriginal sites, a substantially intact Victorian Marine Villa estate, 20th-century hospital complex and 20th-century public recreational space. Each phase of use has yet to be dominated by newer developments, and in combination allows the site to contribute to the landmark qualities of Nielsen Park as seen from within the park and from the waters of Sydney Harbour.

Nielsen Park was listed on the New South Wales State Heritage Register on 28 August 2017 having satisfied the following criteria.

The place is important in demonstrating the course, or pattern, of cultural or natural history in New South Wales.

Nielsen Park Reserve may be of state heritage significance as it demonstrates the entire range of human occupation of the site including pre-colonisation. A variety of archaeological and art sites within the park demonstrate the place of this landscape in Birrabirragal Aboriginal country. Nielsen Park forms part of one of the first land grants in Australia. It forms part of the original grant to William Charles Wentworth, excised to form the Greycliffe Estate at the marriage of a Wentworth daughter, Fanny Katherine Wentworth.

The original area and buildings of the Greycliffe estate dating from 1851, survive in a recognisable form. They are rare examples of a Marine Villa that has retained its setting in relation to the harbour. Greycliffe is one of a select group of houses owned and built by influential members of Sydney society on Sydney Harbour in the nineteenth century. The site is of considerable historic significance as it represents the picturesque aspirations of wealthy members of society during this period, and how a European landscape aesthetic was implemented in the Australian context. The intactness of Greycliffe, together with associated stables, coach house, gardener's cottage and the landscape setting contributes to an understanding of the cultural history of NSW.

Nielsen Park Reserve represents an early 20th-century appreciation by both citizens and the State Government of the value of an important harbour side landscape. For a century, Nielsen Park has epitomised the recreational value of Sydney Harbour and is one of the first major recreational reserves created along the southern shore of Sydney Harbour. The establishment of the Nielsen Park Trust in 1912 represents an early demonstration of community concern for the conservation of the Sydney harbour foreshore led by the Harbour Foreshores Vigilance Committee.

Shark beach is an historically iconic bathing location and has seen a series of bathing enclosures and associated structures develop over time. The bay, bordered by the existing swimming enclosure, together with structures including the kiosk, bathing pavilion and promenade demonstrate the surge in interest and evolving trends of public bathing and recreational activity throughout the 20th century.

For more than fifty years, Greycliffe House played an important role in infant health care. In 1914, it became the Lady Edeline Hospital for Babies (only the second hospital established in Australia for infants under the age of two years) and then the Vaucluse Tresillian Mothercraft Home and Training School (the third such home established) until 1968. The establishment of an infant care facility at Greycliffe House illustrates contemporary understandings of the fresh air and harbour side location as a therapeutic landscape for infants. Various alterations and additions from this period demonstrate major changes in the philosophies and methodologies of infant care and are of great historical and social significance.

Steel Point Battery, which was part of the 1870s harbour chain of defences, designed by James Barnet, occupies a prominent headland location and retains much of its layout and form. It may be significant at a state level as part of a suite of harbour fortifications.

The place has a strong or special association with a person, or group of persons, of importance of cultural or natural history of New South Wales's history.

The state heritage significance of the former Greycliffe Estate, now known as Nielsen Park, may be enhanced through its strong associations with important figures in the history and development of NSW. It is associated with John and Fanny Reeve, the Wentworth family (in particular Fitzwilliam Wentworth) and a range of notable tenants who were prominent men and women from the political, legal and commercial circles of 19th century Sydney. Also associated with this period of the site's development is noted mid-19th-century architect and surveyor, John F. Hilly who designed Greycliffe House and its outbuildings.

The use of Greycliffe as an Infant Hospital saw a close association with eminent paediatrician Dr Margaret Harper, whose work on infant diet, care and disease has remained highly influential. Nielsen Park has a strong association with William Notting, Secretary of the Harbour Foreshores Vigilance Committee and Park Trustee, who led the public move to have the area preserved. The name of the reserve, Nielsen Park, acknowledges the Secretary of Lands at the time, Niels Nielsen who provided government support for the establishment of the park. Some buildings related to the 20th-century use of the site as a public place of leisure, such as the Dressing Pavilion, are associated with the Unemployment Relief Work Fund which employed builders during the Great Depression.

The place is important in demonstrating aesthetic characteristics and/or a high degree of creative or technical achievement in New South Wales.

Nielsen Park may be of state heritage significance as it contains two fine architectural examples of mid-19th-century residential buildings. Greycliffe House and its related outbuildings designed by architect J F. Hilly; and the Steele Point Battery and Barracks and associated cottage designed by Colonial Architect, James Barnet. The buildings are still situated in their landscape setting. In addition, a diverse range of recreational park buildings such as the kiosk, cottage, dressing shed and toilet buildings (mostly from the office of the Government Architect) are also extant and in their landscape setting. They all are excellent examples of their type and demonstrate the importance of the park as a recreational area and its development since the early 20th century. The natural and cultural landscape, together, constitute an iconic Harbour side location with impressive views.

The place has potential to yield information that will contribute to an understanding of the cultural or natural history of New South Wales.

Due to its rich and diverse range of uses from pre-settlement times to the present (including uses such as a private residential estate, a colonial fort and recreational reserve), Nielsen Park may be of state significance for its ability to contribute to the understanding of the long term cultural and natural history of the harbour. There is great potential for insights into the cultural practises of the Birrabirragal, and other Aboriginal peoples from Sydney Harbour more broadly, to be extrapolated from further investigation into the numerous Aboriginal archaeological sites which have been identified across the site. There is high archaeological potential for evidence of the various phases of European occupation across the site, ranging from agricultural practises, defence activities and recreational activities. This would notably include the rubbish deposits on the western side of Mount Trefle which have been identified as highly likely to contain material of significance from the fire-damaged Greycliffe House or nearby historic properties.

The place possesses uncommon, rare or endangered aspects of the cultural or natural history of New South Wales.

Nielsen Park may be of state heritage significance as it retains a rare example of a waterfront mid-19th estate that has survived in a near original state. The retention of Greycliffe House, its outbuildings, grounds and historic view lines is rare. The Steele Point Battery is the only harbour fort to survive in its entirety, together with the associated cottage, also designed by James Barnet. Nielsen Park also contains the last surviving parcel of remnant bushland in the eastern suburbs with two endangered plant species including the Nielsen Park Sheoak (Allocasuarina portuensis). The site is unique in that the one landscape clearly demonstrates various phases of use from the cultural practises of the Birrabirragal through to leisure activities from the early 20th century to the present.

The place is important in demonstrating the principal characteristics of a class of cultural or natural places/environments in New South Wales.

Nielsen Park contains a rich collection of indigenous archaeology characteristic of coastal sites. It represents one of the finest public recreational harbour areas in Sydney and may be of state significance for its use for public leisure spanning the 20th and 21st centuries. Within Nielsen Park is a fine example of a mid-Victorian marine villa, Greycliffe House, which has retained its outbuildings and historic harbour views. The development of the site as a public recreational space has sympathetically responded to the aesthetic principles and planning of the Victorian estate. At a prominent position on the harbour front Nielsen Park contains one of the 1870s fortification complexes that were built as a group on promontories around Sydney Harbour. It is representative as one of several fortification complexes designed by architect James Barnet.

== See also ==
- List of parks in Sydney
