= Nephogenes melanoptila =

Scientific classification
- Kingdom: Animalia
- Phylum: Arthropoda
- Clade: Pancrustacea
- Class: Insecta
- Order: Lepidoptera
- Family: Oecophoridae
- Genus: Nephogenes
- Species: N. melanoptila

Binomial name
- Nephogenes melanoptila (Meyrick, 1883)

Synonyms
- Trachypepla melanoptila Meyrick, 1915; Eulechria dochmotypa Turner, 1938

Species of moth

Nephogenes melanoptila is a species of moth in the family Oecophoridae. It was described by Edward Meyrick in 1883. It is found in Australia, where it has been recorded from Queensland and New South Wales.

The wingspan is 14–18 mm. The forewings are light fuscous grey, with scattered grey-whitish scales, and sometimes a few black scales. There is a raised blackish tuft in the disc before the middle, and a second obliquely beyond it on the fold, sometimes connected with the margins by a few raised black scales. An irregular line of raised black scales is found from three-fifths of the costa to the anal angle, more strongly marked in the disc. There are also a few black scales forming a carved transverse line towards the hindmargin. The hindwings are fuscous grey.

The larvae possibly feed on Kunzea capitata.
