= Sydney Harbour National Park =

National park in New South Wales, Australia

- IUCN category II (national park)
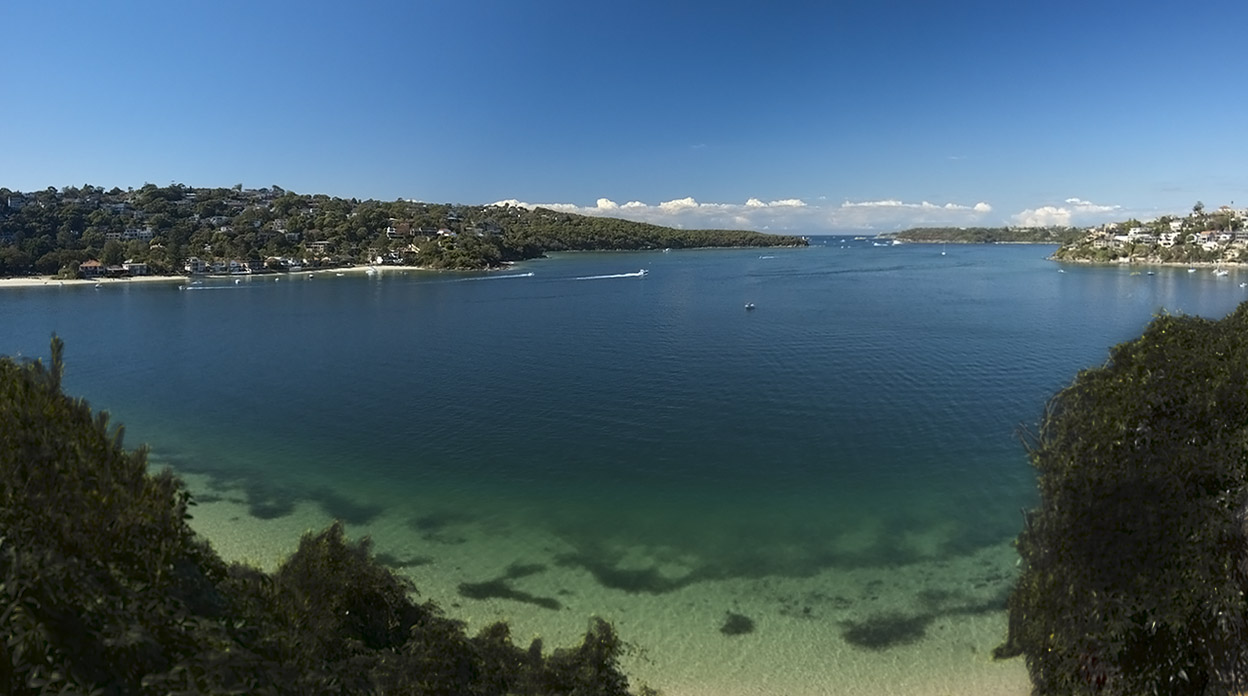
- Headlands, Sydney Harbour

- Location within New South Wales
- Location: New South Wales
- Nearest city: Sydney
- Coordinates: 33°47′48″S 151°17′30″E
- Area: 3.92 km^{2} (1.51 sq mi)
- Established: 4 April 1975
- Governing body: NSW National Parks and Wildlife Service
- Website: Official website

The Sydney Harbour National Park is an Australian national park comprising parts of Port Jackson, Sydney and its foreshores and various islands. The 392-hectare (970-acre) national park lies in New South Wales and was created progressively, from 1975.

The national park protects the landforms of Bradleys Head, Clark Island, Dobroyd Head, Fort Denison, Georges Head, Goat Island, Middle Head, Nielsen Park, Rodd Island, Shark Island, Sydney Heads including the Quarantine Station at North Head and The Gap bluff at South Head. The national park also protects the waterway between North Head and Dobroyd Head, defined as the North Sydney Harbour Aquatic Reserve. Parts of the national park lie outside the harbour and face the Tasman Sea.

The national park is managed by the NSW National Parks and Wildlife Service.

== History ==
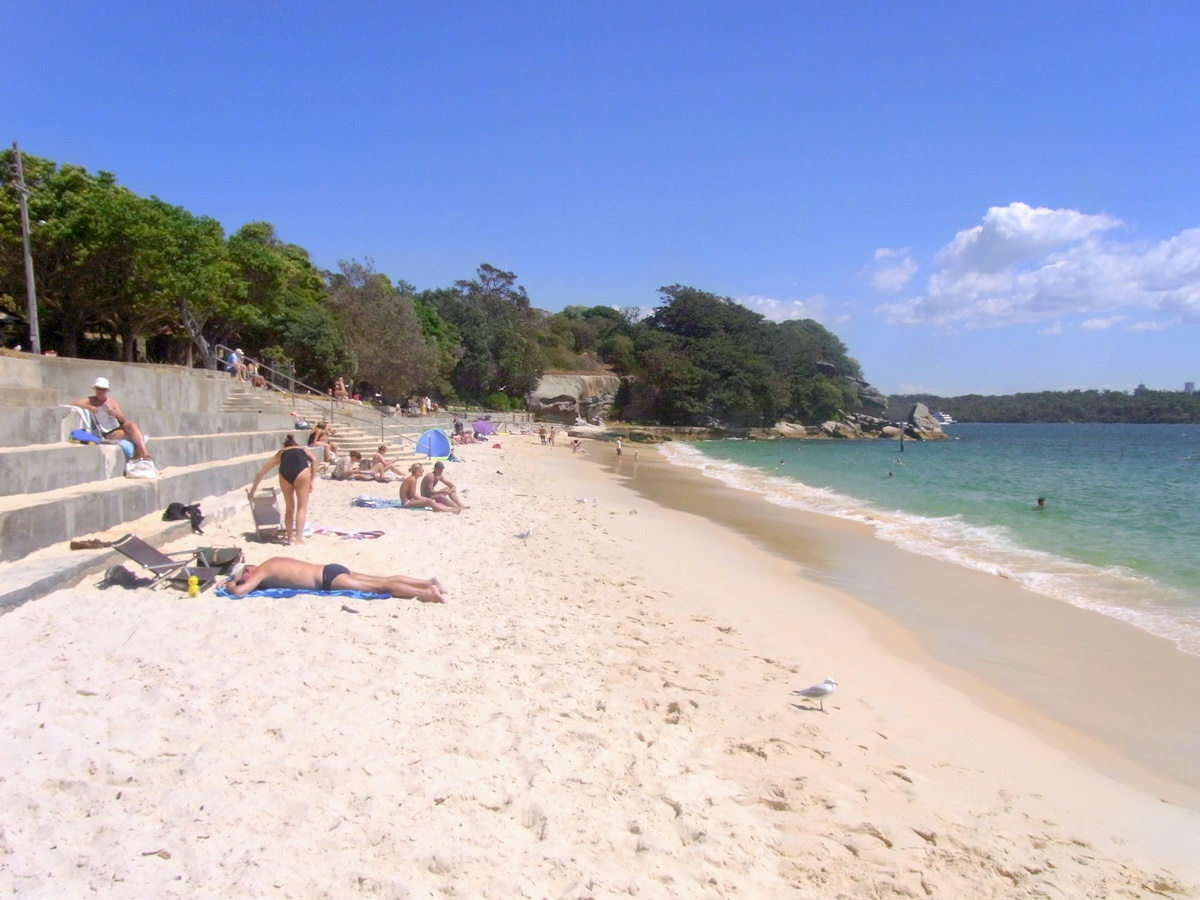
The beach at Nielsen Park, Vaucluse, part of the national park

Residential development has impacted a significant amount of the harbour foreshores over many years. Much of what remained was preserved partly due to the presence of military bases, and partly because of the work of conservationists. Early conservationists were responsible for stopping mining at Ashton Park in the 19th Century. Other places were saved because of people such as Niels Neilsen, who became the New South Wales Minister for Lands and a strong advocate of a public reserve around Sydney Harbour. Nielsen was ahead of his time when he used the phrase "national park" in regard to the harbour foreshores, but Sydney eventually caught up with him.

It was not possible to undo all the damage done in past decades, but there was still much that could be preserved, and the 1960s were a particularly active time in this regard. In 1965 the Government of New South Wales began buying land around the foreshores, and the National Trust suggested a national park in 1968. In the following year, the NSW Government announced a plan whereby it would buy Commonwealth land around the harbour. The Sydney Harbour National Park was finally gazetted in 1975, with Nielsen Park at Shark Bay being added in 1978. Extra land was transferred from Commonwealth to State Government control, and added to the national park in 1979; the historically important quarantine station at Manly was added in 1984.

== Features ==
The national park is renowned for its sheltered beaches, tranquil picnic spots, rich Aboriginal, colonial and military heritage, aquatic reserves and harbour islands.

The Guringai Resting Places, at both Reef Beach and Quarantine Station, are Aboriginal reburial sites where ancestral remains have been returned to Country. Access to the Aboriginal burial sites is restricted at the request of the Aboriginal community.

Military fortifications, at the Georges Head Battery, Fort Denison, and North, Middle and South Heads stretch back to the early years of the colony. At the Quarantine Station there are archaeological features and over a thousand engravings. Historic sites include Greycliffe House, erected at Shark Bay by the Wentworth family in neo-Gothic style during the 1850s; and the mast of the first HMAS Sydney at Bradleys Head. There is also a swimming beach at Nielsen Park, a restaurant and a cafe.

== See also ==
- Protected areas of New South Wales
