= Greycliffe House =

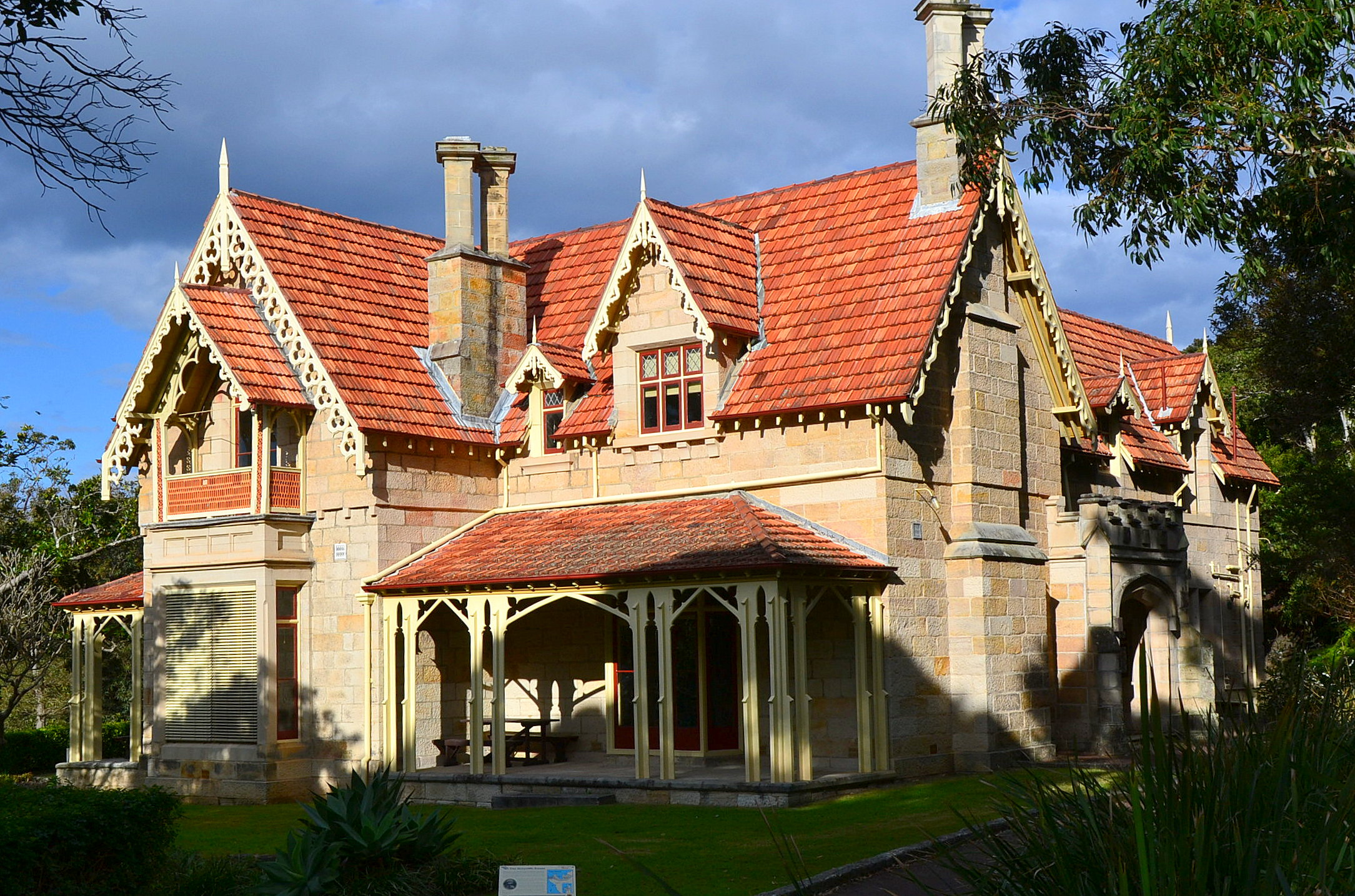
- Greycliffe House in 2012

- Location within east Sydney

General information
- Status: Completed
- Type: House
- Architectural style: Victorian Rustic Gothic
- Location: 21–23 Mona Road, Vaucluse, New South Wales, Australia
- Coordinates: 33°51′06″S 151°15′59″E
- Completed: c. 1852
- Client: John Reeve

Technical details
- Material: Sydney sandstone; Cedar joinery

Design and construction
- Architect: John Frederick Hilly

Register of the National Estate
- Official name: Greycliffe House
- Designated: 21 March 1978
- Reference no.: 2498

New South Wales Heritage Register
- Official name: Greycliffe House; Greycliffe Precinct
- Type: Built

Greycliffe House is an historic, two-storey residential dwelling situated in the Sydney suburb of Vaucluse, New South Wales, Australia. Completed in c. 1852 in the Victorian Rustic Gothic style, Greycliffe House is listed on the now defunct Australian Register of the National Estate and on the State Heritage Inventory.

== History ==
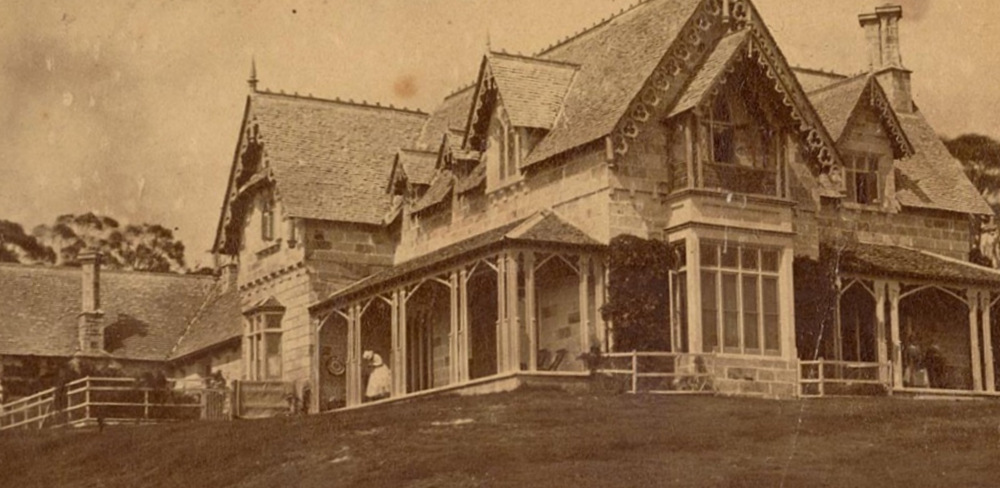
Greycliffe House, Vaucluse, c. 1875

Greycliffe House was built out of sandstone, with cedar joinery and fine quality plasterwork, for one of the daughters of William Charles Wentworth. Fanny Wentworth married John Reeve, a wealthy migrant from England. Reeve purchased land at Shark Beach from Wentworth and commissioned the architect John Frederick Hilly to build Greycliffe, which was completed circa 1852. A sealed entrance road, originally Greycliffe's carriage dive, leads to the house. Reeve never lived in Greycliffe, preferring to travel to England with his wife. Instead, the house was leased to a string of prominent Sydney citizens, including, initially, Colonel John George Nathaniel Gibbes (1787–1873), MLC, the then Collector of Customs for NSW. The house provided an ideal vantage point for Gibbes, as he could watch the movements of shipping on Sydney Harbour's main channel from its north-facing verandah. Gibbes and his wife, Elizabeth, dwelt at Greycliffe until 1859—when he retired from the Customs Service and they moved to their new home, Yarralumla homestead, in what is now the capital city of Canberra. Yarralumla is now the official residence of the Governor-General of Australia.

A succession of private leaseholders lived at Greycliffe after the departure of Mrs and Mrs Gibbes. In 1911, the house was transferred to public ownership and given over by the New South Wales Government for use as a hospital for babies and then as a mothercraft centre. Then, in 1978, the house was added to the Sydney Harbour National Park along with the recreational area surrounding it known as Nielsen Park.

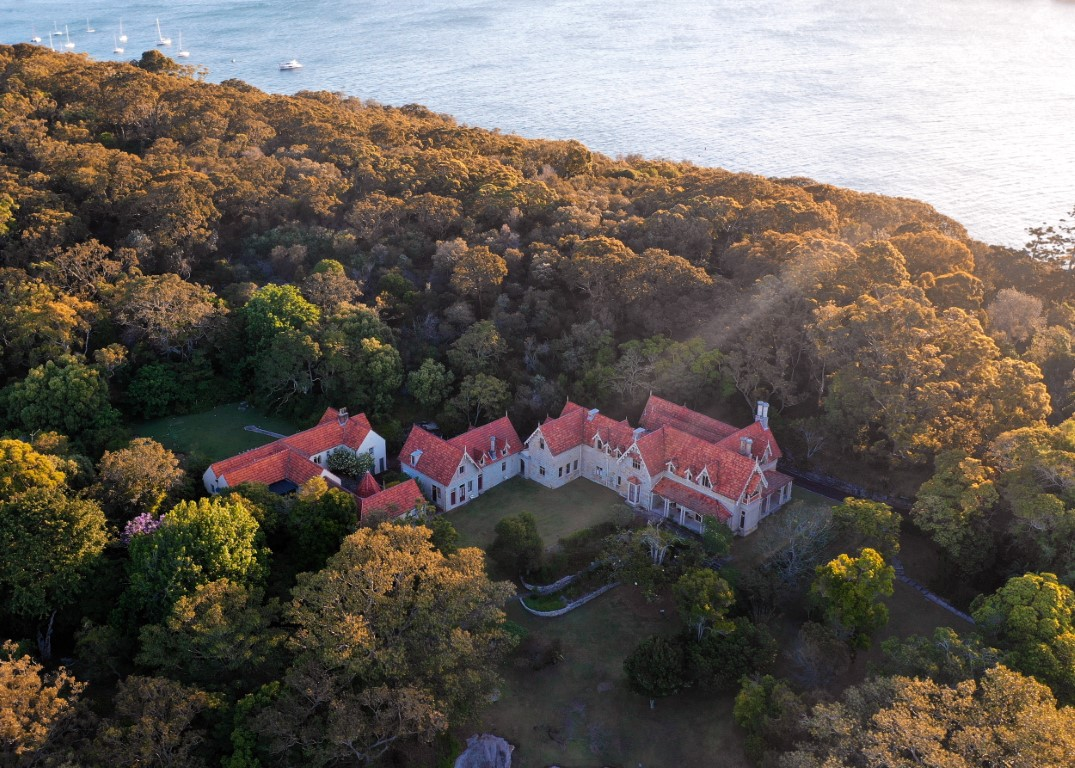
View of the estate and its surrounds

As it stands today, Greycliffe is a large, elaborate and well-preserved neo-Gothic Victorian house which retains unobstructed water views across to the northern shore of Sydney Harbour. It boasts multiple gables, a long entrance hall, a stately staircase and carved barge boards. Stables adjoin at the rear and the residence's gardens tumble down to the beachfront, while natural bushland frames the house to the rear. The house's upstairs interior and roof were extensively damaged by fire in 1897 but the structure was restored soon after.

Greycliffe has functioned as a visitors' centre and headquarters for the Sydney Harbour National Park.

The house was the setting for the Bligh family saga in the 2013 Australian television series A Place To Call Home.
