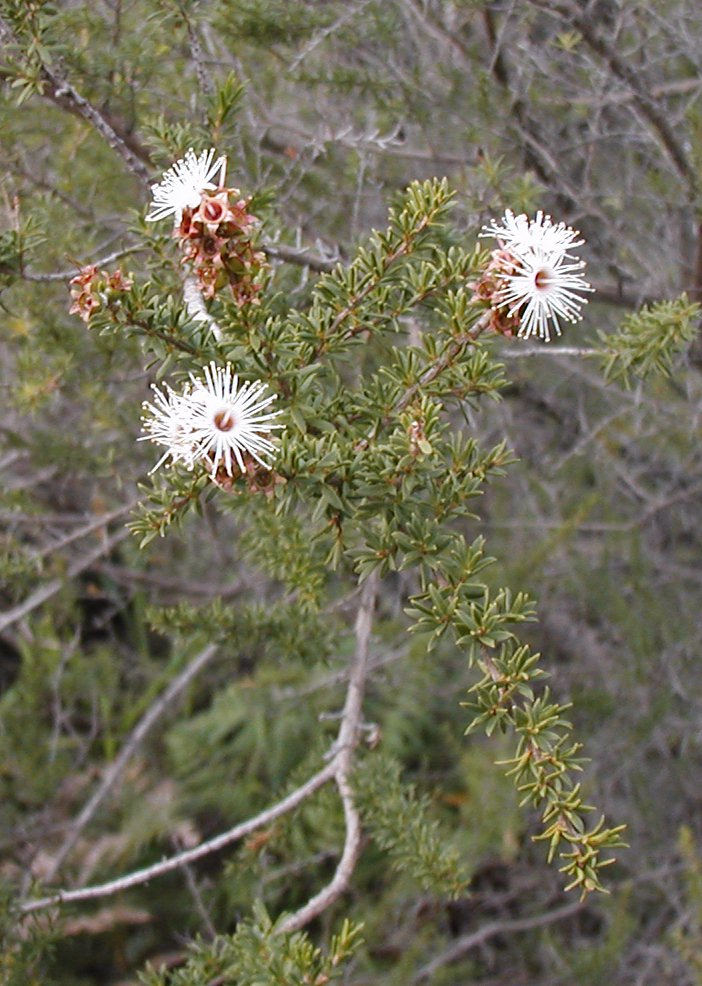

Scientific classification
- Kingdom: Plantae
- Clade: Tracheophytes
- Clade: Angiosperms
- Clade: Eudicots
- Clade: Rosids
- Order: Myrtales
- Family: Myrtaceae
- Genus: Kunzea
- Species: K. ambigua

Binomial name
- Kunzea ambigua (Sm.) Druce

= Kunzea ambigua =

Tick bush

Species of flowering plant

Kunzea ambigua, commonly known as white kunzea or tick bush, is a species of flowering plant in the family Myrtaceae and endemic to eastern Australia. It is an erect shrub with linear to narrowly lance-shaped leaves and white, more or less sessile flowers and dehiscent fruit.

== Description ==
Kunzea ambigua is an erect shrub that typically grows to a height of 2–4 m (6 ft 7 in – 13 ft 1 in) and has young stems covered with shaggy hairs. The leaves are arranged alternately, linear to narrowly lance-shaped, 4–12 mm (0.16–0.47 in) long and 1.0–1.5 mm (0.039–0.059 in) wide on a petiole about 0.5 mm (0.020 in) long. The flowers are white, more or less sessile, crowded on leafy side branches or in the axils of upper leaves. The sepals are narrowly triangular, 1.5–2.0 mm (0.059–0.079 in) long and the petals the same length, the stamens 3–5 mm (0.12–0.20 in) long. The ovary usually has three locules and the style is 5 mm (0.20 in) long. Flowering mainly occurs from October to January, and the fruit is dehiscent, 2.5–3.5 mm (0.098–0.138 in) long and 3–4 mm (0.12–0.16 in) in diameter.

== Taxonomy and naming ==
Kunzea ambigua was first formally described in 1797 by James Edward Smith who gave it the name Leptospermum ambiguum in the Transactions of the Linnean Society of London. In 1917, English botanist George Claridge Druce transferred the species to Kunzea. The generic name honours German naturalist Gustav Kunze, while the specific epithet is derived from the Latin adjective ambiguus meaning "doubtful" or "uncertain".

A pale pink-flowered hybrid with Kunzea capitata has been recorded from Stony Range Flora reserve in Dee Why in Sydney's northern beaches region.

== Distribution and habitat ==
Kunzea ambigua is found from northeastern New South Wales, having been recorded in the Grand High Tops of the Warrumbungle National Park, through Victoria and into Tasmania. It grows on sandy soils in coastal or near-coastal regions. It is a very common dry forest shrub of the Sydney region, and regenerates in disturbed or cleared areas. It is associated with scrub she-oak (Allocasuarina distyla), Melaleuca nodosa, cheese tree (Glochidion ferdinandi) in heath or scrub, and with red bloodwood (Corymbia gummifera), peppermint gum (Eucalyptus piperita), forest red gum (Eucalyptus tereticornis), woolybutt (E. longifolia), thin-leaved stringybark (E. eugenioides), and white feather honeymyrtle (Melaleuca decora) in forested areas. In Wilsons Promontory in Victoria, Kunzea ambigua is the dominant species within scattered areas of treeless heath that occur on granite hills and mountains.

== Ecology ==
Insects are the main pollinators of Kunzea ambigua; these include various types of beetles including jewel beetles (Buprestidae), scarab beetles (Scarabaeidae), flower beetles (Mordellidae), and checkered beetles (Cleridae) as well as butterflies, flies, bees and wasps. Tick bush is killed by fire and regenerates from seed. Plants can also colonise unburnt sites with ample sunlight.

== Use in horticulture ==
It was one of the first species of Australian plant introduced into cultivation in England. It is a hardy and adaptable plant that is used in windbreaks and sand dune stabilization plantings, as well as gardens, particularly in Australian gardens using native plants according to principles of natural landscaping. The species attracts Australian native insects, and can provide shelter for small birds and the long-nosed bandicoot (Perameles nasuta).
