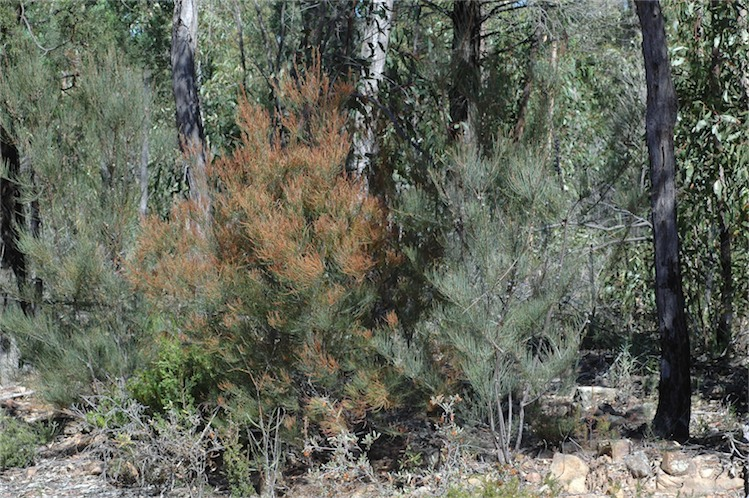
- Habit of subsp. diminuta in Goobang National Park

Scientific classification
- Kingdom: Plantae
- Clade: Tracheophytes
- Clade: Angiosperms
- Clade: Eudicots
- Clade: Rosids
- Order: Fagales
- Family: Casuarinaceae
- Genus: Allocasuarina
- Species: A. diminuta

Binomial name
- Allocasuarina diminuta L.A.S.Johnson
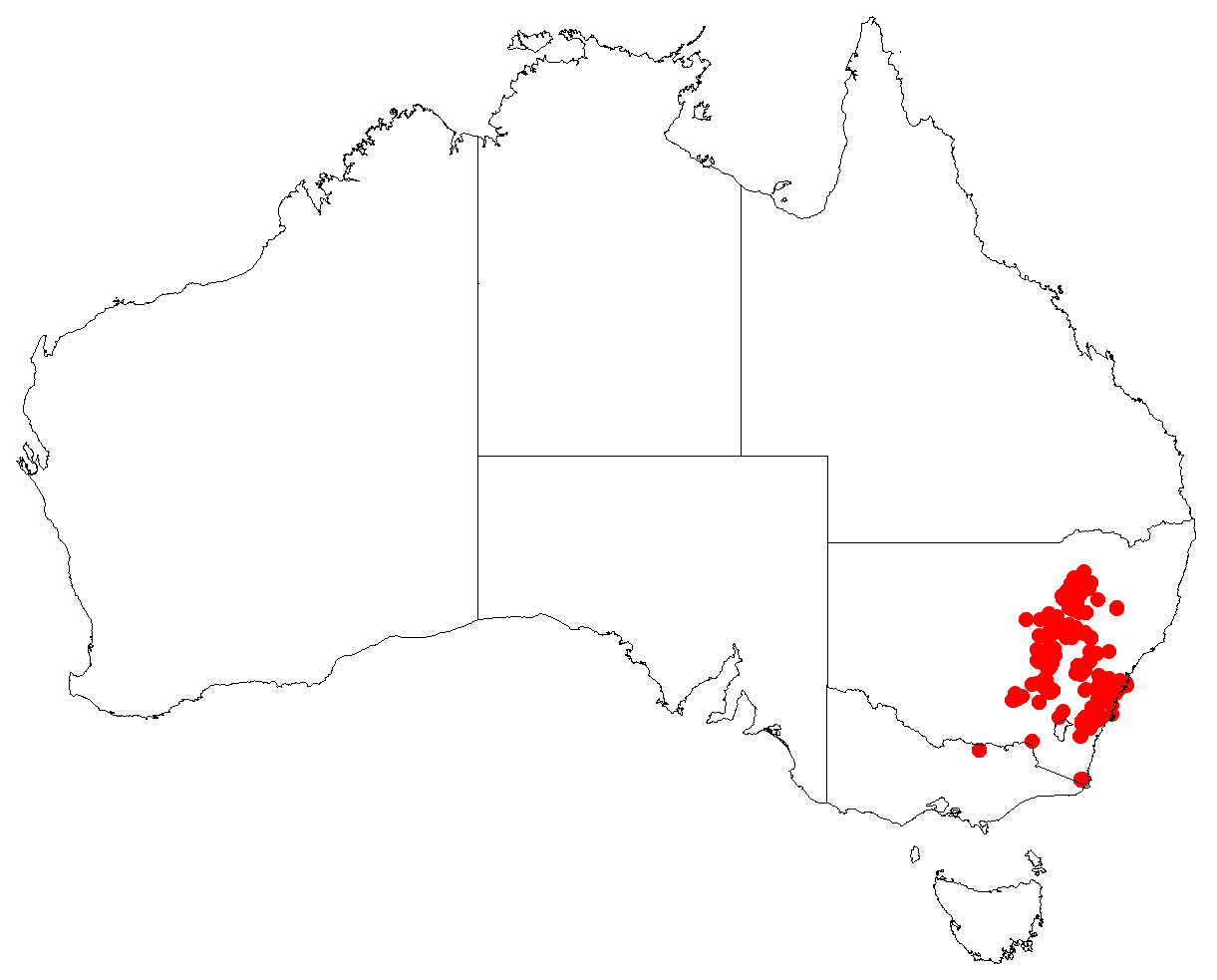
- Occurrence data from AVH

= Allocasuarina diminuta =

Species of flowering plant

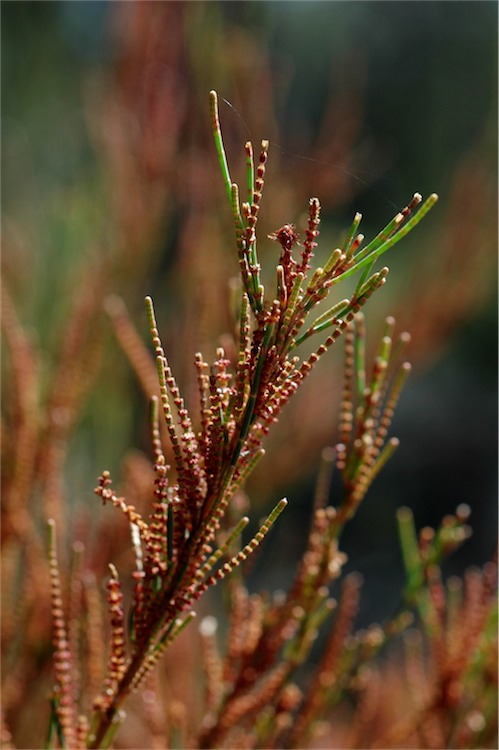
Male spikes of subsp. diminuta

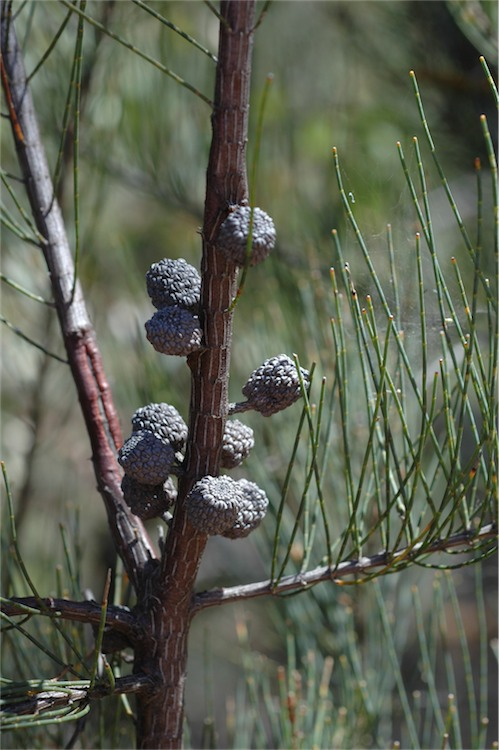
Female cones of subsp. diminuta

Allocasuarina diminuta is a species of flowering plant in the family Casuarinaceae and is endemic to eastern New South Wales. It is a dioecious or monoecious shrub or small tree that has branchlets up to 230 mm (9.1 in) long, the leaves reduced to scales in whorls of six to ten, the fruiting cones 5–20 mm (0.20–0.79 in) long containing winged seeds (samaras) 3.5–5.0 mm (0.14–0.20 in) long.

== Description ==
Allocasuarina diminuta is a dioecious or monoecious shrub or small tree that typically grows to a height of 1–5 m (3 ft 3 in – 16 ft 5 in) and has smooth bark. Its branchlets are more or less erect, up to 230 mm (9.1 in) long, the leaves reduced to erect to spreading, scale-like teeth 0.3–0.8 mm (0.012–0.031 in) long, arranged in whorls of six to ten around the branchlets. The sections of branchlet between the leaf whorls (the "articles") are 5–12 mm (0.20–0.47 in) long and 0.6–1.1 mm (0.024–0.043 in) wide. Male flowers are arranged in spikes 5–50 mm (0.20–1.97 in) long, the anthers 0.5–0.8 mm (0.020–0.031 in) long. Female cones are cylindrical, on a peduncle 2–10 mm (0.079–0.394 in) long. Mature cones are 5–20 mm (0.20–0.79 in) long and 5–12 mm (0.20–0.47 in) in diameter, the samaras about 3.5–5 mm (0.14–0.20 in) long.

== Taxonomy ==
Allocasuarina diminuta was first formally described in 1989 by Lawrie Johnson in the Flora of Australia from specimens collected by Karen Wilson near Conimbla National Park in 1982. The specific epithet, (diminuta) means "diminished", referring all its parts being smaller than those of the similar A. distyla.

In 1989, in the same Flora of Australia, Johnson described three subspecies of Allocasuarina diminuta, and the names are accepted by the Australian Plant Census:

- Allocasuarina diminuta subsp. annectens L.A.S.Johnson is a shrub to 1.0–2.5 m (3 ft 3 in – 8 ft 2 in) with six or eight teeth 0.4–0.8 mm (0.016–0.031 in) long, the anthers 0.6–0.8 mm (0.024–0.031 in) long. The epithet annectens means "binding" or "connecting", referring to this species being intermediate between the other two.
- Allocasuarina diminuta L.A.S.Johnson subsp. diminuta is a shrub to 2–5 m (6 ft 7 in – 16 ft 5 in) with six or seven teeth 0.3–0.5 mm (0.012–0.020 in) long, the anthers 0.5–0.7 mm (0.020–0.028 in) long.
- Allocasuarina diminuta subsp. mimica L.A.S.Johnson is a shrub to 1.0–2.5 m (3 ft 3 in – 8 ft 2 in) with six to eight teeth 0.3–0.6 mm (0.012–0.024 in) long, the anthers 0.5–0.7 mm (0.020–0.028 in) long. The epithet mimica means "mimicking", referring to this species being "a little replica" of A. distyla.

== Distribution and habitat ==
This allocasuarina grows in heath or low open woodlands, on sandstone ridges and hillsides in New South Wales. Subspecies annectens occurs between Sassafras, Braidwood and Lake Bathurst with a disjunct population south-west of Eden. Subspecies diminuta is found on the western slopes and nearby plains between Temora and the Pilliga forest, and as far east as Capertee and Bathurst. Subspecies mimica mainly occurs in the Sydney Basin, but is also found as far as Blackheath, Taralga and Bundanoon.
