= Ashton Park =

Park in Preston, United Kingdom

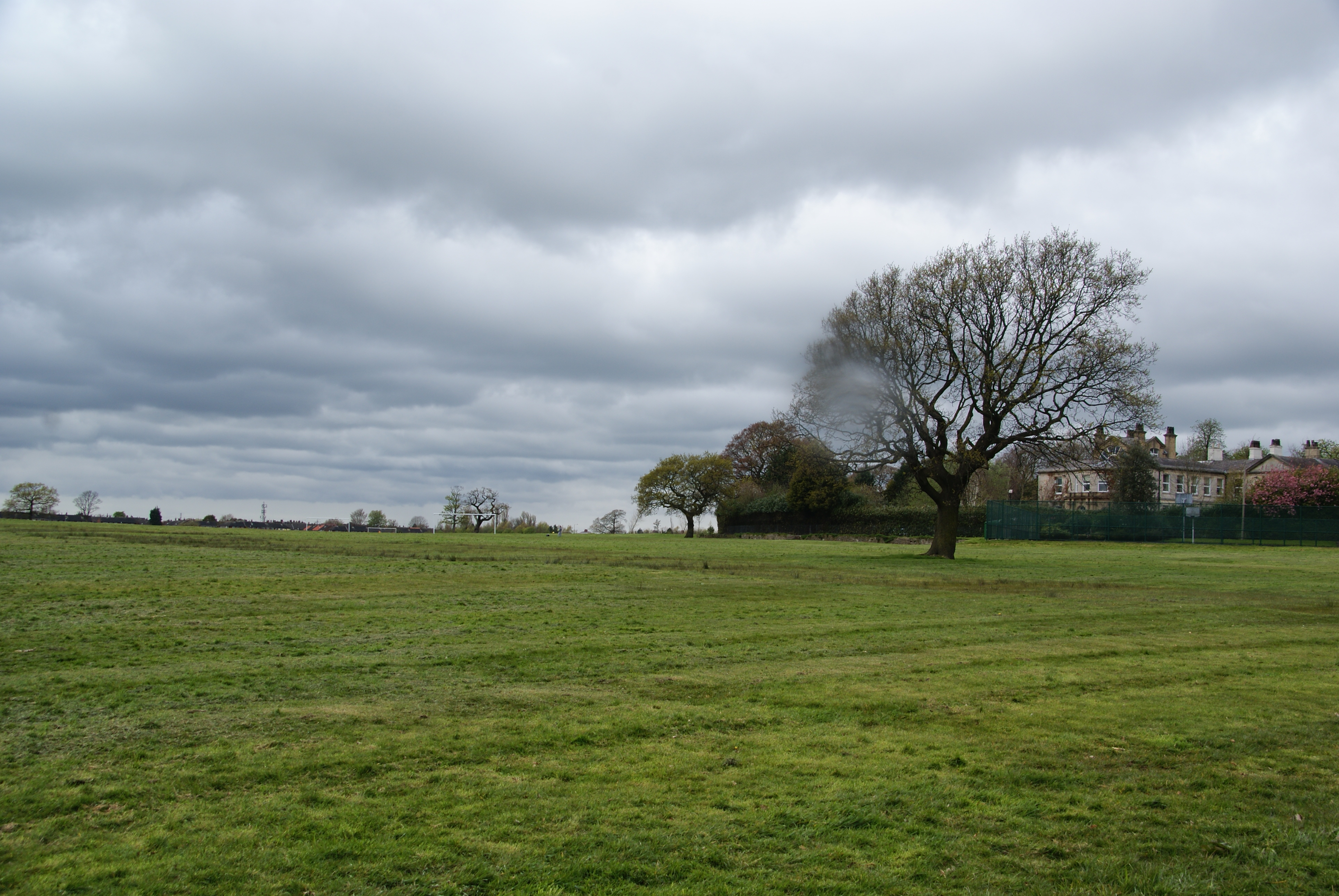
- View across Ashton Park

- Location within Preston
- Interactive map of Ashton Park
- Location: Preston, Lancashire, England
- Coordinates: 53.7664°N 2.7460°W
- Operator: Preston City Council

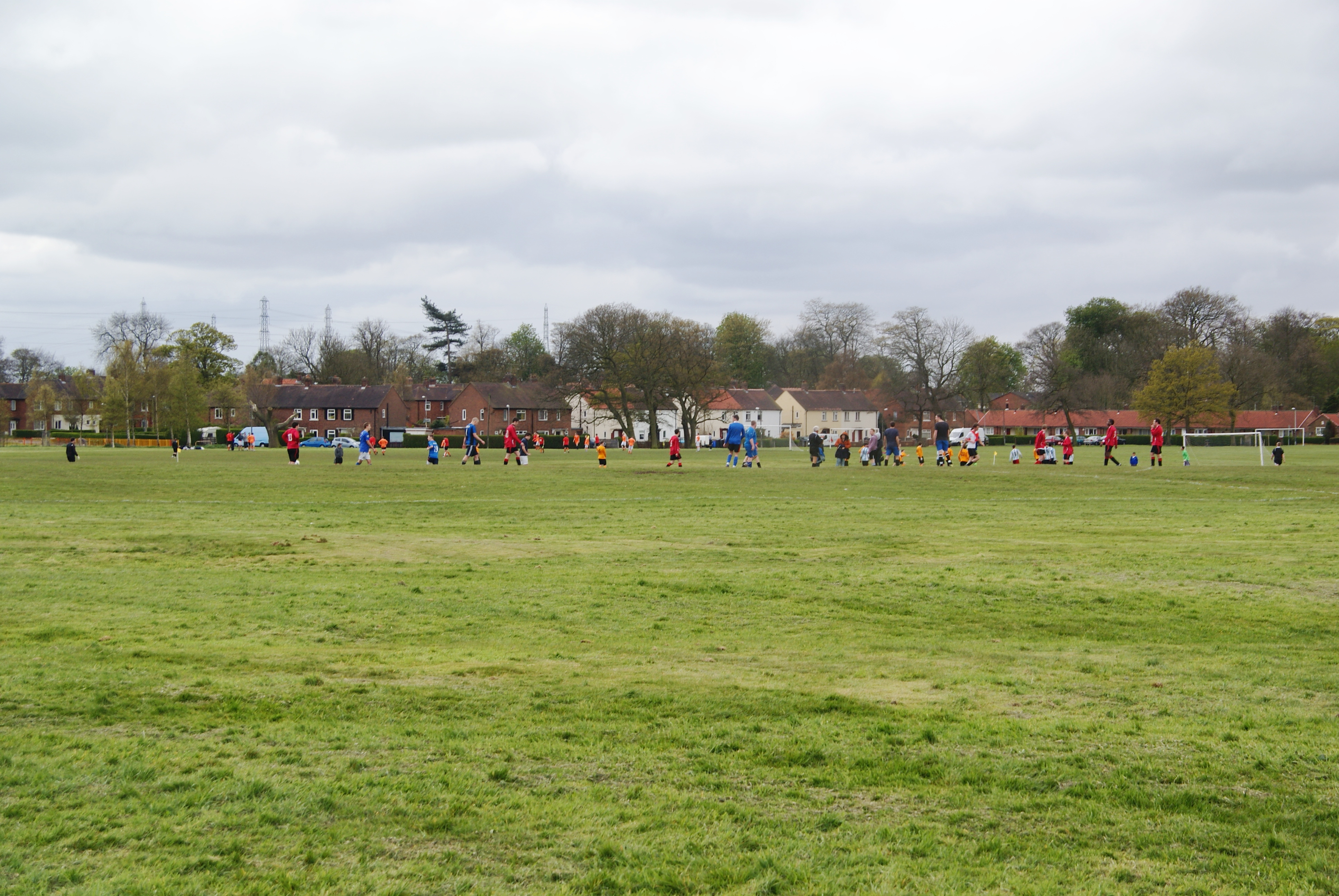
Football games in Ashton Park

Ashton Park is situated in Ashton-on-Ribble to the west of Preston, Lancashire, England. It has one bowling green, two play areas, with swings, roundabouts and climbing frames, several football pitches within a large, main field, and contains within it a magnificent country house. It is the headquarters of the Armed Forces Group, Dig in North West and Let's Grow Preston. These are all situated within the walled garden that also contains the Peace garden the fruit garden and Ashton Community Garden. It also has a beautiful woodland area, ornamental gardens and many flower beds. Ashton House, the large country house within the park, has recently undergone extensive repair and restoration and is particularly well used as a children's nursery school. Extensive parking facilities are provided in the park which is located immediately to the south of Blackpool Road, which proceeds westwards to Cottam. Nearby on the southern side are the docks, and Riversway complex, containing many offices and shops including Morrisons, McDonald's, and Pets at Home. To the west are the Larches and Savick estates and Lea.

== History ==
Ashton Park has a colourful history started by the Pedders family, who had made their fortune by founding the Old Preston Bank (located on Church St), built the Ashton Estate and Mansion in 1810 and lived there until 1861. Nearby Pedders Street and Pedders Lane are testimony to the importance of the family.

When Edward Pedder died in 1861, it became apparent that there were not sufficient funds to pay all the demands on the bank and so the estate and its contents had to be sold.

The park was then purchase by Edmund Robert Harris, who became Preston's greatest public benefactor and left the mansion to the governors of Queen Anne's Bounty for the benefit of poor clergy, which evolved into the Church Commissioners.

After the death of Harris in 1877 the estate was sold again. After many changes of ownership, the Calverts, mill owners, sold the mansion to English Electric at the end of World War I, who used it as a social club and for sporting activities. The best known from this period was Dick, Kerr's Ladies football team.

In 1937, Preston Town Council finally bought Ashton Park for the sum of £27.00 and the mansion, Ashton House was sold to Lancashire County Council who turned it into a care home for the elderly. In the 1990s the house was sold to its present owners of the pre-school.

== Ashton Park Ranger ==
Ashton Park has its own dedicated Park Ranger who carries out daily patrols and inspections, to makes sure with the grounds maintenance staff, the park is tidy and safe. In addition the Ranger organises Environmental, Historical and Creative events for schools, community groups and general public.

== Friends of Ashton Park ==
Established in 2002, the Friends of Ashton Park work in partnership with the Park Ranger and the Councils Parks Development Team. The Friends play a major role in the organisation of community events and contribute to management decisions, they also help raise funding for improvements and new facilities.
