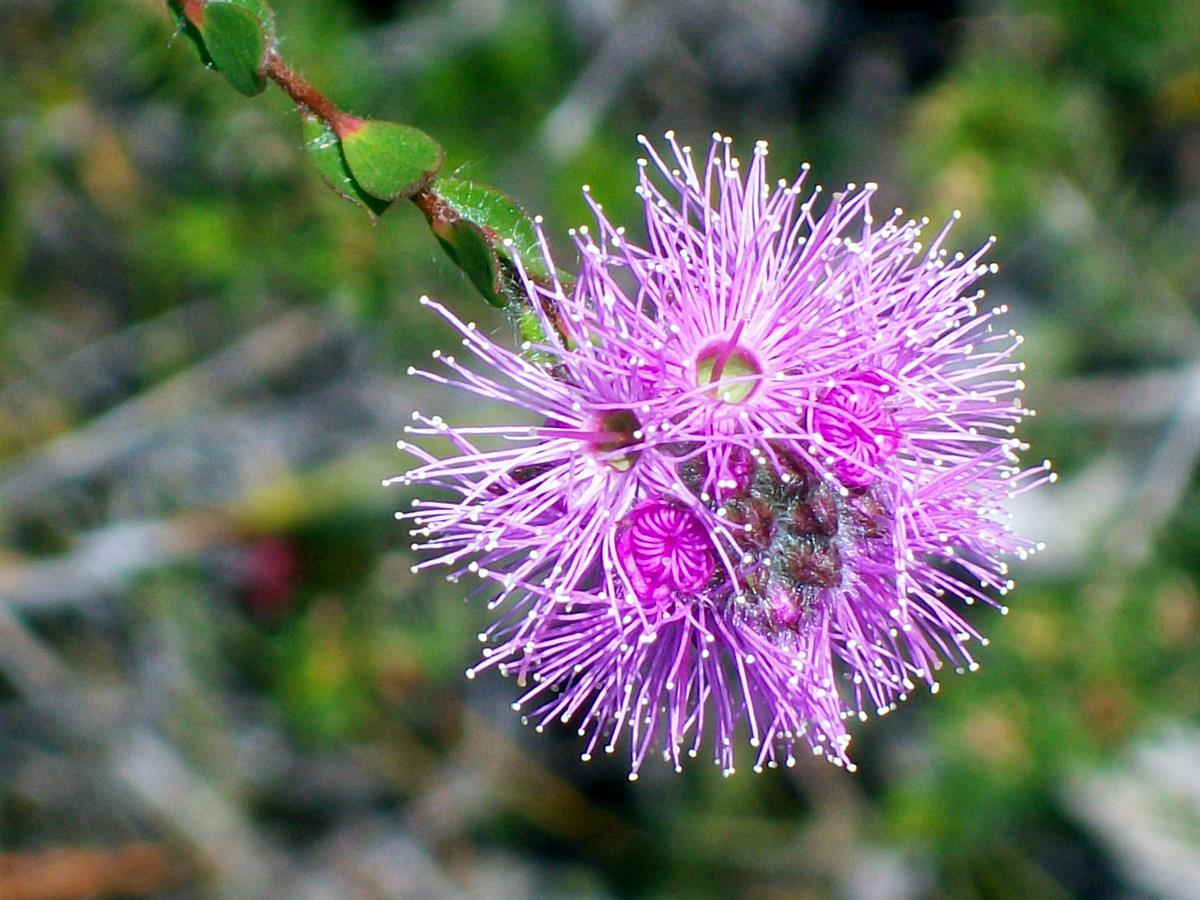
- Ku-ring-gai Chase National Park, Australia

Scientific classification
- Kingdom: Plantae
- Clade: Tracheophytes
- Clade: Angiosperms
- Clade: Eudicots
- Clade: Rosids
- Order: Myrtales
- Family: Myrtaceae
- Genus: Kunzea
- Species: K. capitata

Binomial name
- Kunzea capitata (Sm.) Heynh.

Synonyms
- Kunzea capitata Steud. nom. inval., pro syn.; Metrosideros capitata Sm.; Stenospermum capitatum Sweet nom. inval.; Kunzea capitata auct. non (Sm.) Heynh.: Bean, A.R., Guymer, G.P. & Jessup, L.W. (2007); Kunzea capitata auct. non (Sm.) Heynh.

= Kunzea capitata =

Species of shrub

Kunzea capitata is a shrub species in the family Myrtaceae. It is native to New South Wales in Australia.

== Description ==
Kunzea capitata has a spreading or erect habit and may grow up to 2 metres (6 ft 7 in) in height, but is usually within the range of 0.5–1 metre (1 ft 8 in – 3 ft 3 in). Flowers are pink to purple, or occasionally white. These are produced on the branch ends in "heads". Leaves are 3.5–9 millimetres (0.14–0.35 in) long and 1.5–4.5 millimetres (0.059–0.177 in) wide, with recurved tips and 1 millimetre (0.039 in) long petioles.

== Taxonomy ==
The species was first formally described by English botanist James Smith in 1797 in Transactions of the Linnean Society of London, and given the name Metrosideos capitata. In 1846, Gustav Heynhold transferred the species to Kunzea as K. capitata. The specific epithet (capitata) is derived from the Latin word caput meaning 'head', alluding to the arrangement of the flowers.

== Distribution and habitat ==
The species occurs in heathland and dry sclerophyll forest from the Ulladulla district northward to Richmond River.

== Use in horticulture ==
The species prefers a moist soil in a lightly shaded to sunny position. It is readily propagated by either seed or cuttings.
