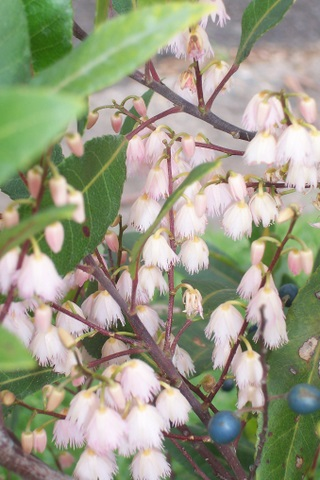
- Elaeocarpus reticulatus flowers and fruit

Scientific classification
- Kingdom: Plantae
- Clade: Tracheophytes
- Clade: Angiosperms
- Clade: Eudicots
- Clade: Rosids
- Order: Oxalidales
- Family: Elaeocarpaceae
- Genus: Elaeocarpus
- Species: E. reticulatus

Binomial name
- Elaeocarpus reticulatus Sm.

Synonyms
- Elaeocarpus cyaneus Sims; Elaeocarpus cyaneus var. carneus Guilf. nom. inval., nom. nud.; Elaeocarpus cyaneus Sims var. cyaneus; Elaeocarpus reticulatus Sm. var. reticulatus; Elaeocarpus reticulatus var. typicus Domin nom. inval.; Perinka reticulata (Sm.) Raf.

= Elaeocarpus reticulatus =

Blueberry ash

Species of flowering plant endemic to Australia

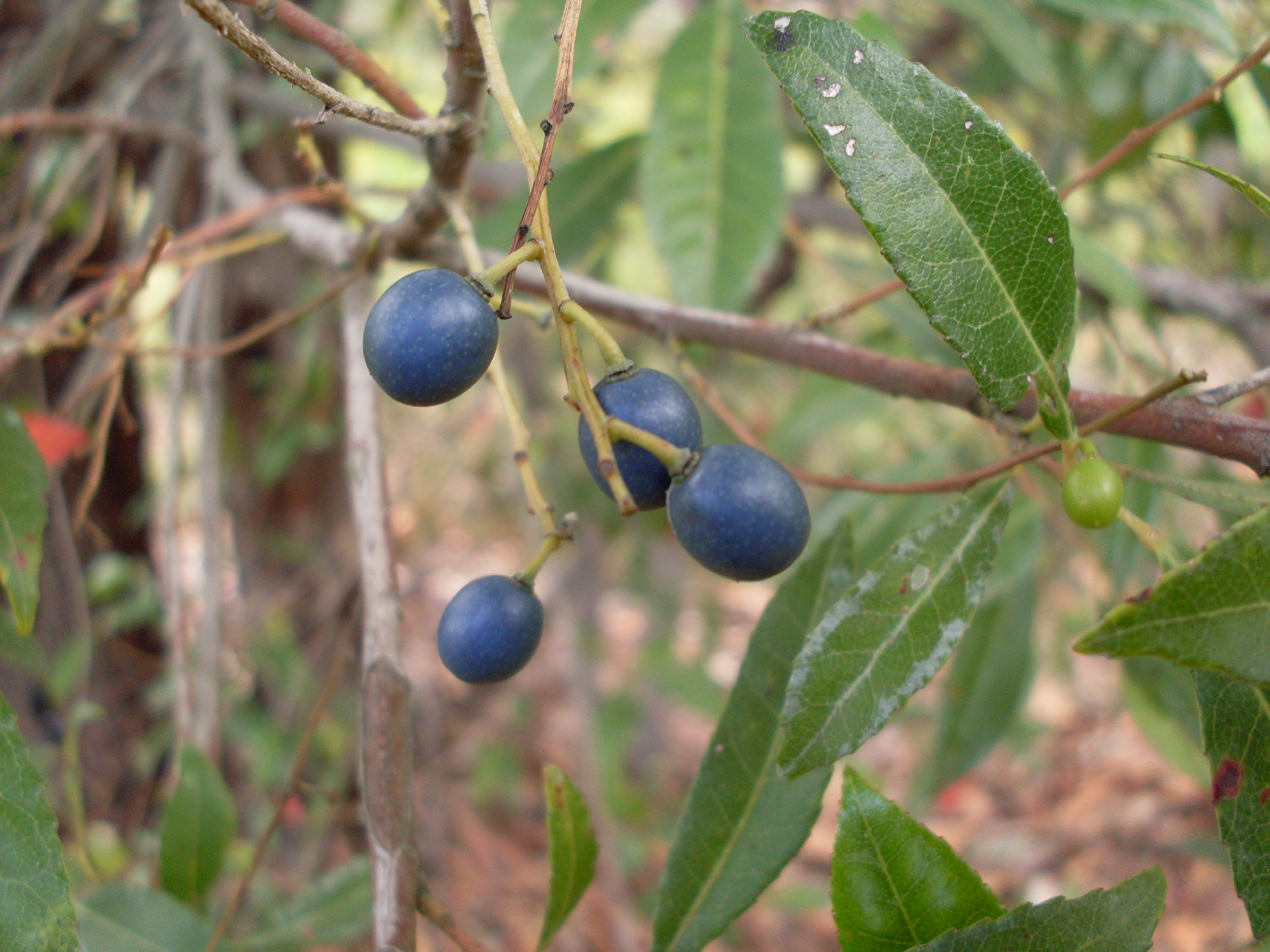
Fruit

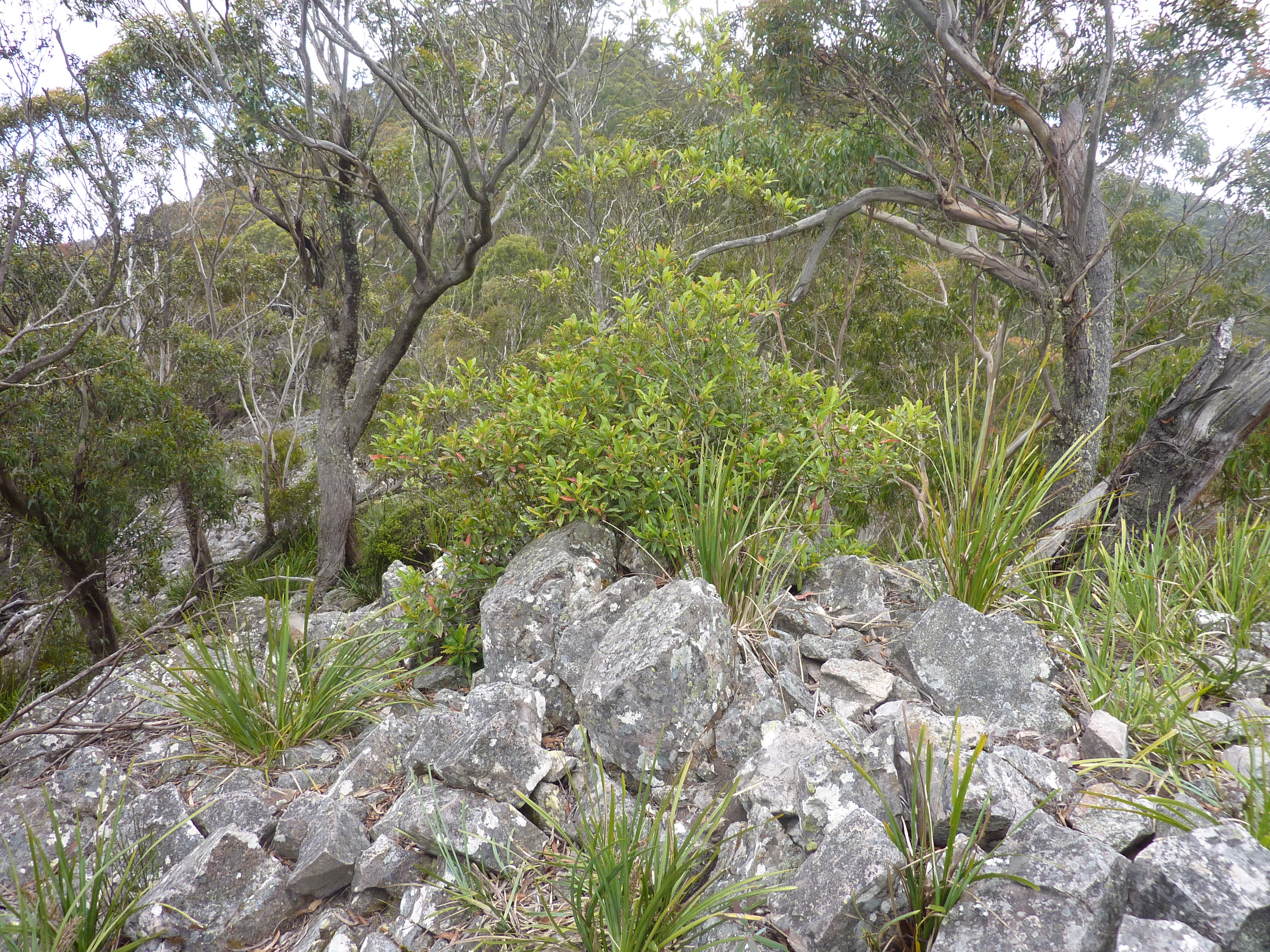
Habit in Kanangra-Boyd National Park

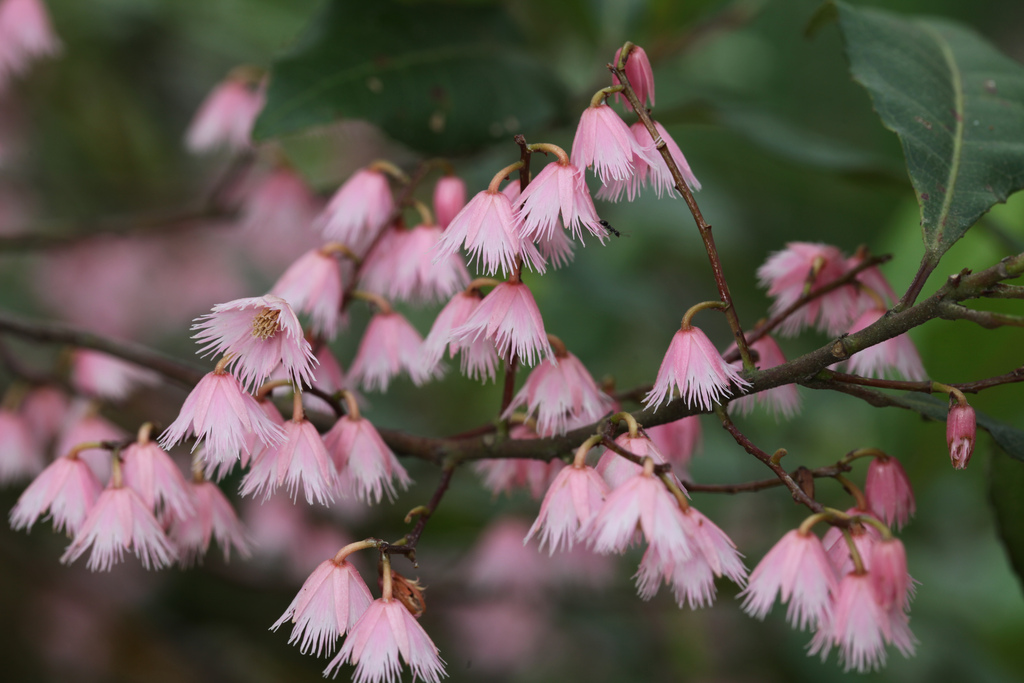
Pinkish flowers

Elaeocarpus reticulatus, commonly known as blueberry ash, ash quandong, blue olive berry, fairy petticoats, fringe tree, koda, lily of the valley tree and scrub ash, is species of flowering plant in the family Elaeocarpaceae, and is endemic to eastern Australia. It is a shrub or small tree with oblong to elliptic leaves, racemes of white or pink flowers and blue, oval to spherical fruit.

== Description ==
Elaeocarpus reticulatus is a shrub or small tree that typically grows to a height of 3–10 m (9.8–32.8 ft), but up to 30 m (98 ft) in some situations, and has a lignotuber at its base. The leaves are simple, (strictly compound with only one leaflet), oblong to elliptic, mostly 50–130 mm (2.0–5.1 in) long and 10–40 mm (0.39–1.57 in) wide on a petiole 5–20 mm (0.20–0.79 in) long. The leaves are more or less glabrous, often turn red before falling, have regular teeth along the edges, small domatia and a prominent network of veins on both surfaces. The flowers are arranged in racemes up to 50–80 mm (2.0–3.1 in) long, with between five and ten flowers, each on a pedicel 4–8 mm (0.16–0.31 in) long. The five sepals are narrow triangular 5–6 mm (0.20–0.24 in) long and about 1 mm (0.039 in) wide. The five petals are white, sometimes pinkish, 6–7 mm (0.24–0.28 in) long and about 2 mm (0.079 in) wide, the tip with between seven and ten linear lobes. There are between thirteen and fifteen stamens and the style is 3–4 mm (0.12–0.16 in) long. Flowering occurs from October to January and the fruit is a more or less spherical, oval or elliptical blue drupe about 12 mm (0.47 in) long.

== Taxonomy ==
Elaeocarpus reticulatus was first formally described in 1809 by James Edward Smith in Abraham Rees's The Cyclopaedia from specimens collected near Port Jackson by John White. The specific epithet (reticulatus) means "with the appearance of a net".

== Distribution and habitat ==
Blueberry ash often grows in tall eucalypt forest, in or near rainforest, often in moist gullies, but also found on stony ridges. It occurs along the east coast of Australia from Fraser Island in Queensland to Flinders Island in Tasmania. In New South Wales it is found from sea level to the ranges and in Victoria to the east of Wilsons Promontory where it is often locally common.

== Ecology ==
The fruits of E. reticulatus are eaten by birds, including wonga pigeons, crimson rosellas, figbirds, white-headed pigeons and olive-backed orioles and the regent bowerbird collects them to decorate its bower.

== Use in horticulture ==
Blueberry ash is described as "an outstanding specimen tree for coastal gardens". Propagation of the plant can be achieved from semi-hardwood cuttings taken in warmer weather, but germination from seed can take several years. The shrub is hardy in most situations and can be grown in shade to full sun.
