= Municipality of Vaucluse =

Former local government area in New South Wales, Australia

- Local government area
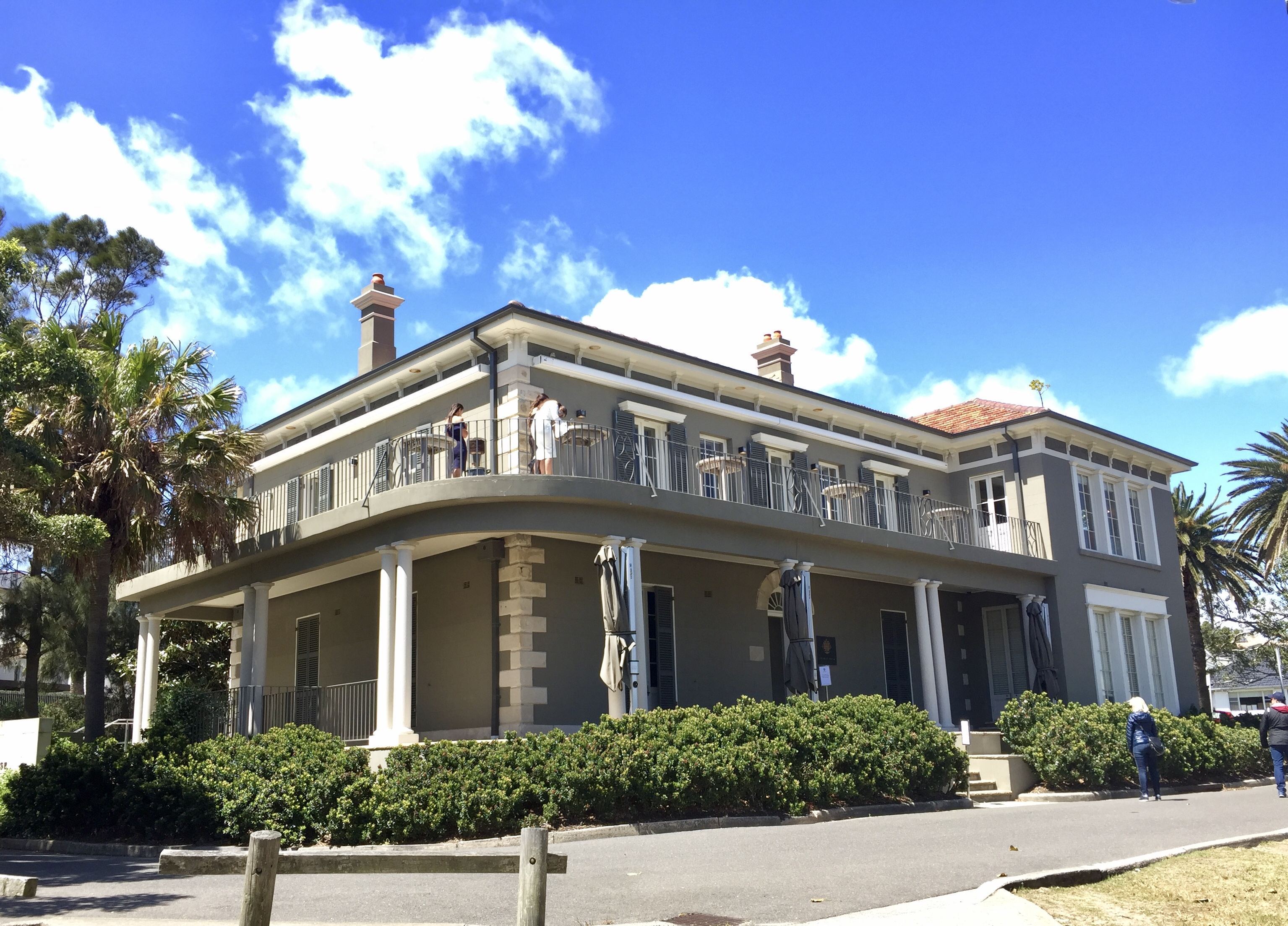
- Dunbar House on Watsons Bay, the council seat from 1924 to 1948.
- Country: Australia
- State: New South Wales
- Region: Eastern Suburbs
- Established: 29 March 1895
- Abolished: 31 December 1948
- Council seat: Vaucluse Town Hall (1910–1924); Dunbar House (1924–1948)

Area
  - Total: 3.1 km^{2} (1.2 sq mi)

Population
  - Total: 9,138 (1947 census)
  - Density: 2,950/km^{2} (7,630/sq mi)
- County: Cumberland
- Parish: Alexandria
LGAs around Municipality of Vaucluse
	Sydney Harbour	Tasman Sea
Sydney Harbour	Municipality of Vaucluse	Waverley
Woollahra	Woollahra	Waverley

The Municipality of Vaucluse was a local government area of Sydney, New South Wales, Australia. The municipality was proclaimed as the "Borough of Vaucluse" on 1 May 1895, seceding from the Municipality of Woollahra, and included the modern suburbs of Vaucluse and Watsons Bay. The council was re-amalgamated with Woollahra to the south with the passing of the Local Government (Areas) Act 1948.

== Council history and location ==
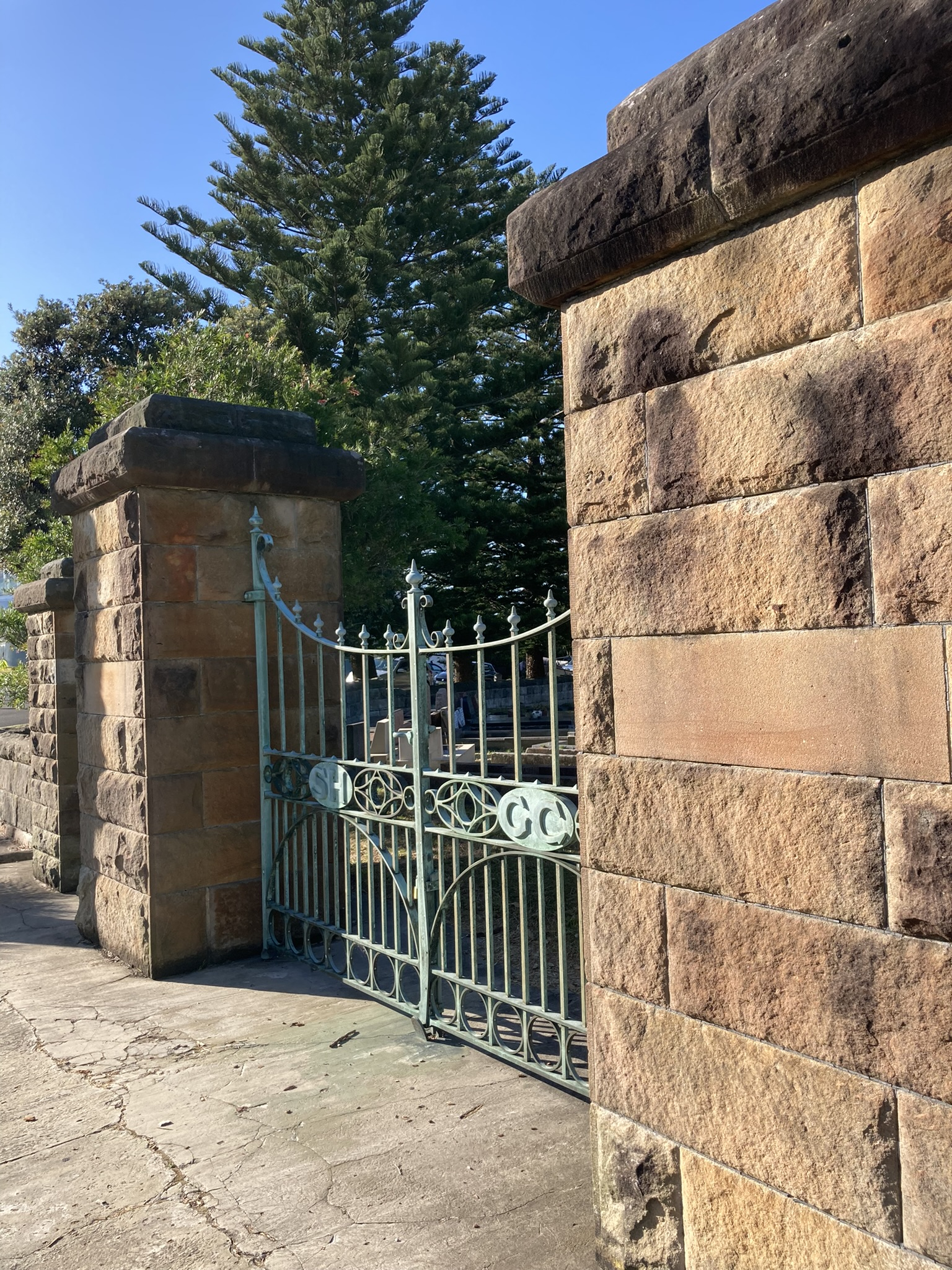
South Head Cemetery gates designed by engineer Edwin Sautelle

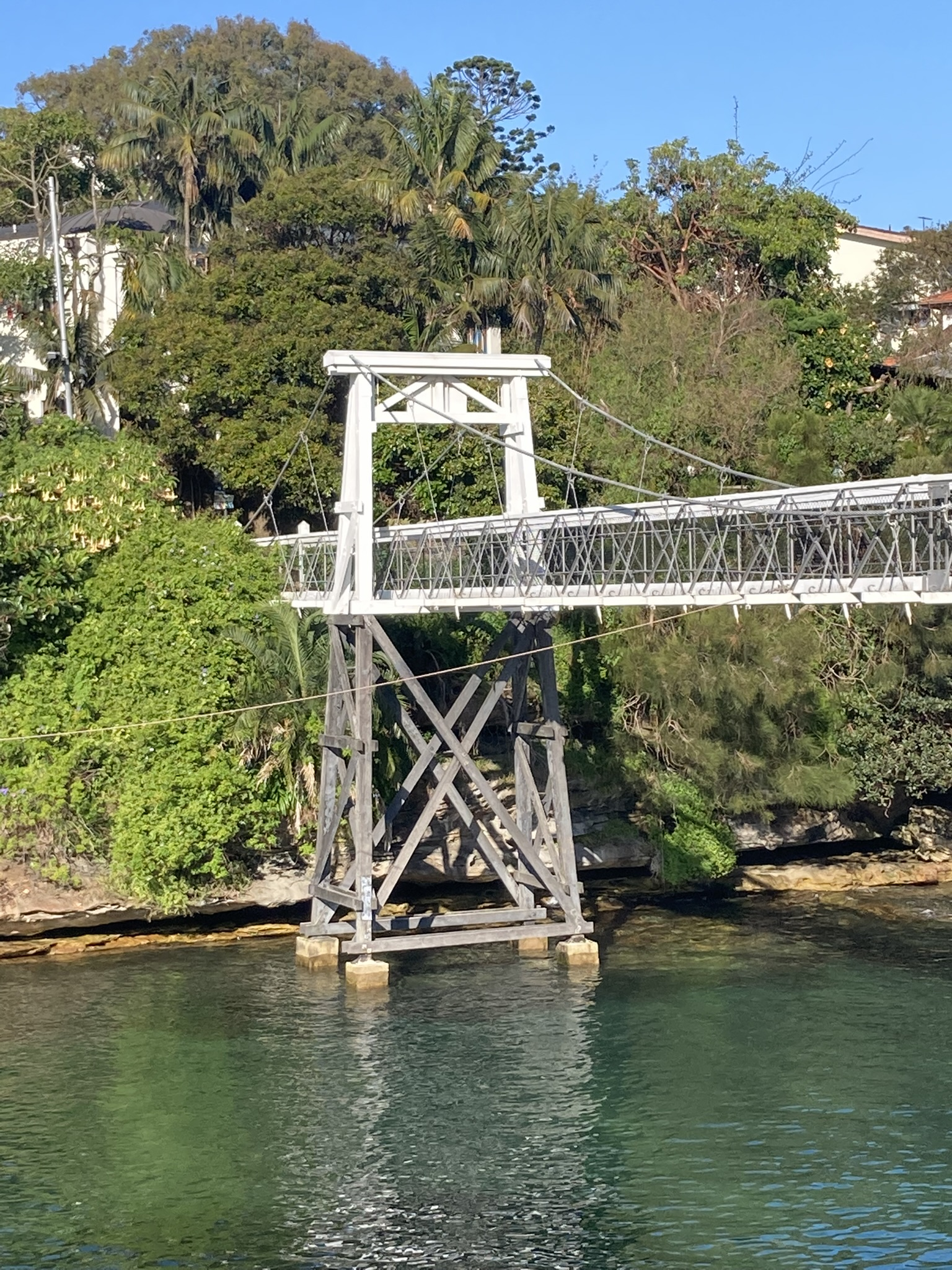
Parsely Bay suspension bridge designed by former Vaucluse town clerk and mayor Edwin Sautelle

The area was first incorporated on 20 April 1860 as part of the Bellevue Ward of the Municipality of Woollahra. However, after the passing of the Municipalities Act, 1867 which allowed for residents to petition the government to secede as their own council area, the idea of a separate municipal council for the areas of Vaucluse and Watsons Bay at the northern end of the Borough of Woollahra gained ground amongst a large group of local residents. In late 1894 a petition was published in the Government Gazette of the State of New South Wales, calling for the area's separation as the "Borough of Vaucluse" on the basis that, among a general sense of a lack of representation and equitable distribution of rate revenue investment, "that the interests of the residents of the area ... and of the remaining portion of the said Borough of Woollahra are entirely different, and that they form virtually separate communities".

Despite the objections of Woollahra Council, on 29 March 1895 the Borough of Vaucluse was proclaimed by the Governor of New South Wales, with the southern boundary comprising Towns Road and Bay View Hill Street and the eastern boundary being Old South Head Road. On 15 May 1895, the first council, comprising nine aldermen in one electorate, was elected (John White the younger, Albert Jones, Harold Francis Norrie, John Dykes, Hugh Stirling Patterson, Herbert Chudleigh, David McCulloch, Charles John Edward Forssberg, William Jack), with Albert Jones elected as the first mayor at the first meeting on 21 May 1895. The first Council Clerk, Edwin Stanhope Sautelle, was appointed on 1 June 1895. With the passage of the Local Government Act 1906, borough ceased to be category of local government area and the Borough of Vaucluse was renamed the "Municipality of Vaucluse".

The council first met in a temporary premises in Watsons Bay, with the old timber customs house and former Gap Inn building at 17 Military Road, Watsons Bay, serving this purpose until more permanent premises could be built. In early 1909, the council voted to commission new council chambers on the Military Road site to a Free Classical design by architect, Varney Parkes. Completed in early 1910 by builders Pocock & Stevens to a cost of £2,500, the new Town Hall was officially opened on 20 April 1910 by the Secretary for Public Works, Charles Lee.

=== Later history ===
In September 1924, Vaucluse Council sold the Town Hall and acquired the nearby Royal Hotel (later renamed Dunbar House) directly opposite Watsons Bay for use as a new Council Chambers. The new Council Chambers were officially opened by the Minister for Local Government, John Fitzpatrick, on 1 November 1924.

By the end of the Second World War, the NSW Government had realised that its ideas of infrastructure expansion could not be effected by the present system of the mostly-poor and smaller inner-city municipal councils and the Minister for Local Government, Joseph Cahill, passed a bill in 1948 that abolished a significant number of those councils. Under the Local Government (Areas) Act 1948, Vaucluse Municipal Council was merged back into the larger neighbouring Municipality of Woollahra. The last meeting of Vaucluse Council was held at Dunbar House on 13 December 1948.

== Mayors ==
#	Mayor	Party	Term start	Term end	Time in office	Notes
1	Albert Jones	Independent	21 May 1895	13 February 1896	268 days	
2	John White, junior	Independent	13 February 1896	28 April 1896	75 days	
3	John Dykes	Independent	28 April 1896	11 February 1899	2 years, 289 days	
4	Charles John Edward Forssberg	Independent	11 February 1899	12 February 1900	1 year, 1 day	
–	John Dykes	Independent	12 February 1900	14 February 1903	3 years, 2 days	
5	William Johnston	Independent	14 February 1903	15 February 1907	4 years, 1 day	
6	William Gilliver	Independent	15 February 1907	6 February 1911	3 years, 356 days	
–	William Johnston	Independent	6 February 1911	13 February 1913	2 years, 7 days	
7	Adam Forsyth	Independent	13 February 1913	4 February 1914	356 days	
8	Edwin Sautelle	Independent	4 February 1914	10 February 1916	2 years, 6 days	
9	George Thomas Stowe	Independent	10 February 1916	July 1917	1 year, 141 days	
10	Henry David Alexander Christison	Independent	July 1917	February 1919	1 year, 215 days	
11	William Williamson	Independent	February 1919	9 September 1920	1 year, 221 days	
–	Henry David Alexander Christison	Independent	9 September 1920	January 1921	145 days	
–	Edwin Sautelle	Independent	January 1921	December 1921		
12	James McIntyre	Independent	December 1921	December 1925		
13	John Herbert Hurst	Independent	December 1925	1 December 1926		
14	Alfred Charles Samuel	Independent	1 December 1926	17 December 1934	8 years, 16 days	
15	Alexander Swinton Carfrae	Independent	17 December 1934	December 1937	2 years, 349 days	
16	Henry Alexander John Abbott	Independent	December 1937	16 March 1939		
17	Ashton Phillip Kurts	Independent	20 March 1939	December 1940		
18	Reg Bartley	Independent	December 1940	December 1942		
–	Alfred Charles Samuel	Independent	December 1942	December 1944		
19	Robert Alexander Stewart	Independent	December 1944	December 1945		
20	Augustus Herbert Hood	Independent	December 1945	31 December 1948		

== Town Clerks ==
Town Clerk	Term start	Term end	Time in office	Notes
Edwin Sautelle	1 June 1895	7 August 1911	16 years, 67 days	
Christopher Joseph Ward	September 1911	January 1913	1 year, 122 days	
Edmund Horler	26 February 1913	31 August 1940	27 years, 187 days	
Phillip Victor Saville Soper	31 August 1940	31 December 1948	8 years, 122 days	
