= Vaucluse, New South Wales =

Vaucluse
- Suburb
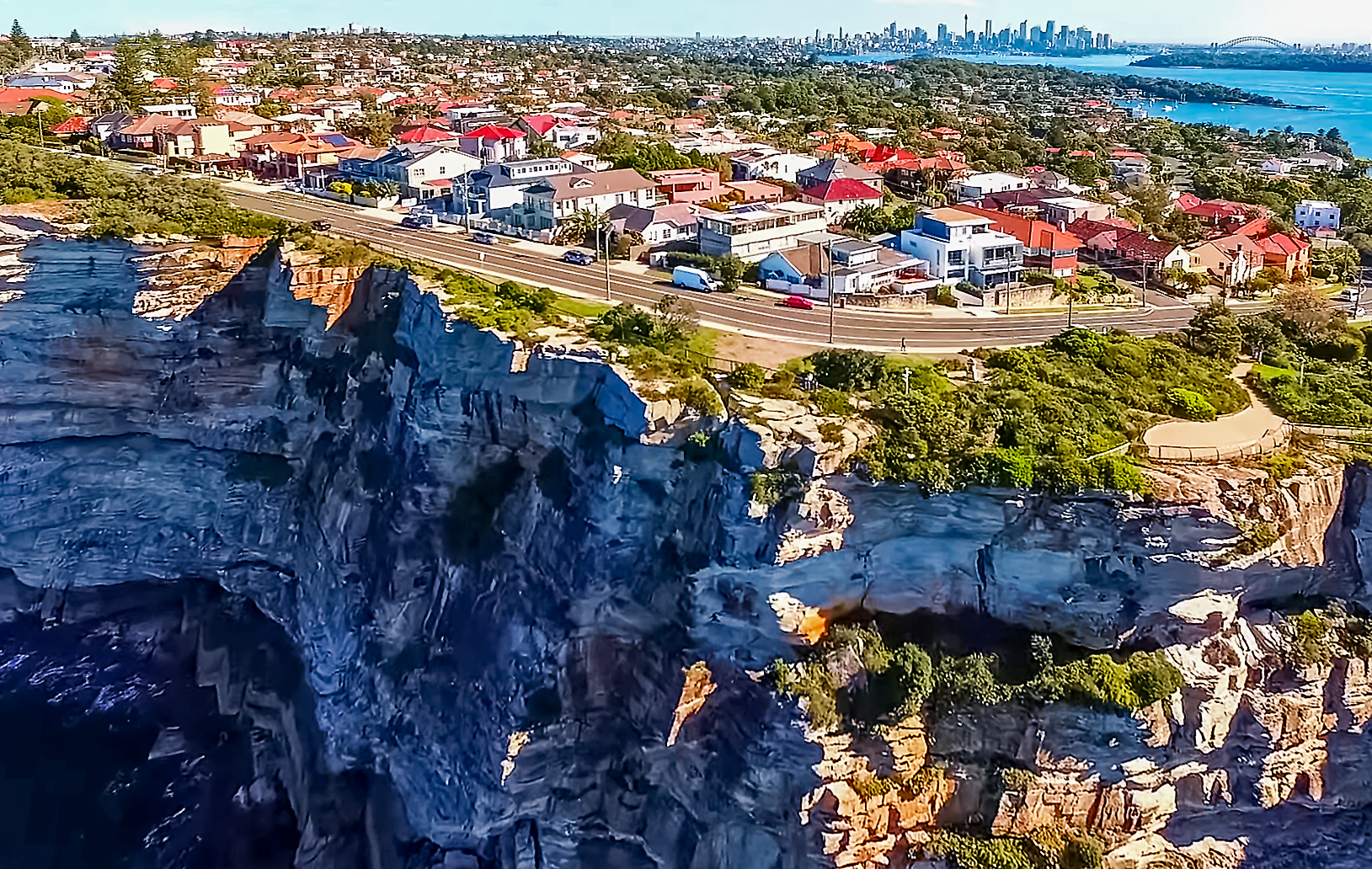
- Clifftop neighbourhoods in the suburb's East

- Interactive map of Vaucluse
- Country: Australia
- State: New South Wales
- City: Sydney
- LGAs: Waverley Council; Woollahra Council
- Location: 9 km (5.6 mi) east of Sydney CBD

Government
  - State electorate: Vaucluse
  - Federal division: Wentworth
- Elevation: 76 m (249 ft)

Population
  - Total: 9,510 (SAL 2021)
Suburbs around Vaucluse
Port Jackson	Watsons Bay	Tasman Sea
Port Jackson	Vaucluse	Tasman Sea
Rose Bay	Rose Bay	Dover Heights

Vaucluse is an eastern suburb of Sydney, in the state of New South Wales, Australia. It is located 8 kilometres (5 mi) east of the Sydney central business district, in the local government areas of Waverley Council and the Municipality of Woollahra.

Vaucluse is located on the South Head peninsula, just South of The Gap with Sydney Harbour on the west and the Tasman Sea to the east. The Sydney Harbour side of the suburb commands views across the harbour to the Sydney Harbour Bridge. The adjacent suburbs are Watsons Bay to the north and Rose Bay and Dover Heights to the south.

Vaucluse is predominantly a residential area, but possesses a small commercial district along a short stretch of New South Head Road. The suburb's landmarks and attractions include sections of Sydney Harbour National Park, the Hermitage Foreshore track, the clifftop Diamond Bay Reserve, Macquarie Lighthouse, Signal Hill Battery, and the historic Vaucluse House.

Several harbour-facing beaches line Vaucluse's western coast. Running south to north, these are Queens, Hermit, Milk, Shark, Parsley Bay, Kutti, and Gibsons beaches.

== History ==
Before European settlement, the area where Vaucluse is now located was inhabited by the Birrabirragal people, an Aboriginal clan who belonged to the coastal Dharug language group. The first European activity in the area took place not long after settlement, when a makeshift signalling station was set up on the ridge overlooking the ocean. Its role was to signal the colony if a ship was approaching. Pilots based at Camp Cove, Watsons Bay, could then meet the ship and guide it through the harbour. A formal signal station was established in 1790, serviced by a bridle trail that later became Old South Head Road in 1811.

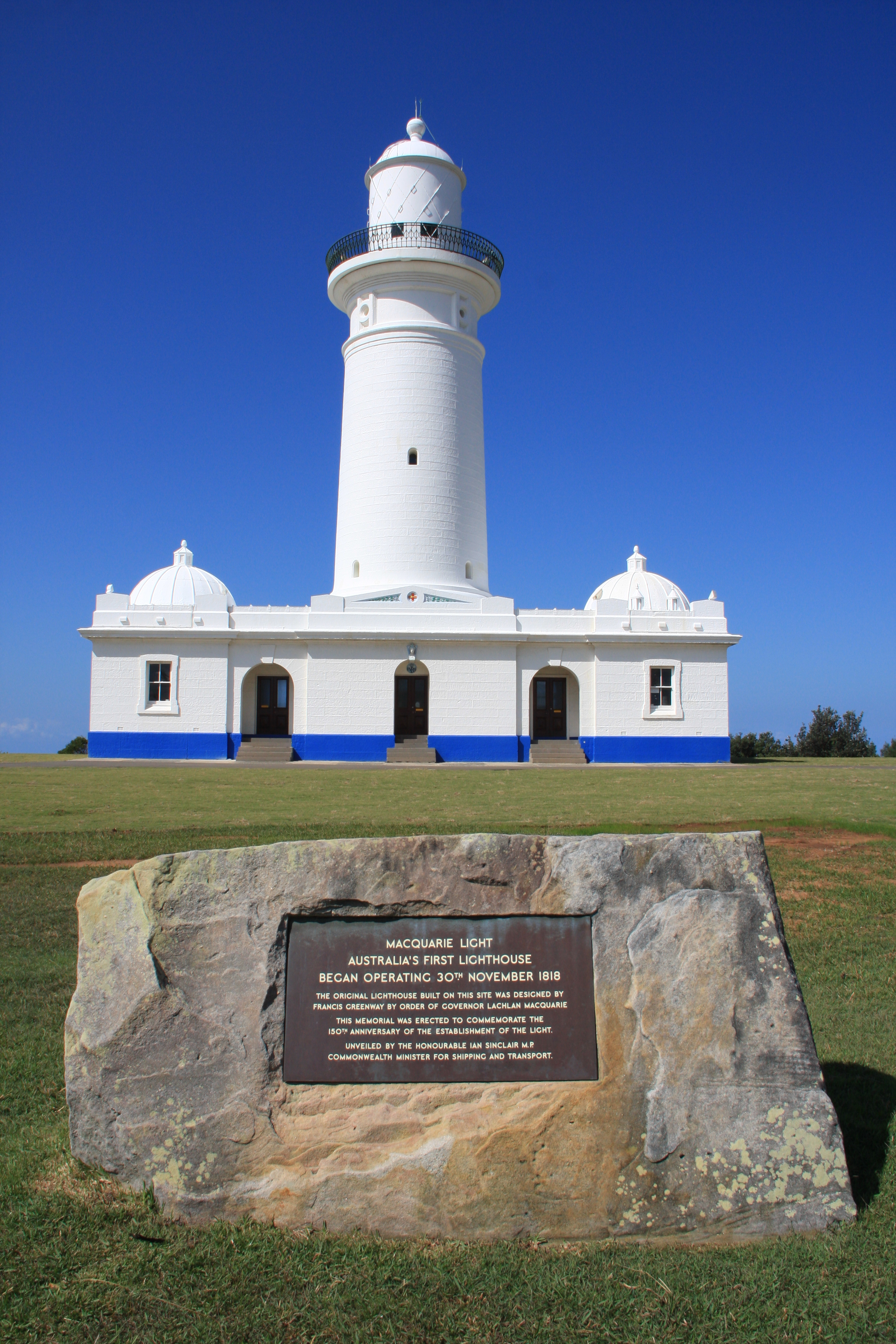
Macquarie Lighthouse, Dunbar Head

Macquarie Lighthouse was constructed on the ridge, a little south of the signal station, in 1816, having been designed by Francis Greenway, the first notable architect in the colony. Residential use of the area also developed.

The original Vaucluse House, from which the area derived its name, was built by Sir Henry Browne Hayes, who had been transported to New South Wales for kidnapping the granddaughter of a wealthy Irish banker. When he arrived, in 1802, he was allowed to buy land from that which was granted to Thomas Laycock in 1793 and Robert Cardell in 1795. The house was then acquired by Captain John Piper in 1822. Sir Henry Browne Hayes, an avid admirer of the 14th-century poet Petrarch, named the house after Petrarch's poem about the famous Fontaine de Vaucluse near the town L'Isle-sur-la-Sorgue, currently in the Department of Vaucluse in southern France. In 1827, the small but charming cottage was bought by William Charles Wentworth (1790–1872), barrister and explorer and one of the men who had crossed the Blue Mountains in 1813. Many structural changes and additions were made while he lived there until 1853. The building has fifteen bedrooms, is in the 1830s Gothic style and sits on 27 acres (11 ha) of gardens. It still survives and is listed on the (now defunct) Register of the National Estate.

In the early 1840s, the present signal station was built by the Colonial Architect, Mortimer Lewis. It has continued to be used up to the present day for controlling shipping in and out of the harbour. Later in the same decade, more residential development occurred with the construction of Greycliffe House at Shark Beach by a son-in-law of William Charles Wentworth. It was a large, sandstone house in the "Victorian Rustic Gothic" style, attributed to the architect John Frederick Hilly. A succession of prominent Sydney identities leased the house during the 19th century. It was gutted by fire in the 1890s but fully restored. It is now used as the visitor centre for the Sydney Harbour National Park.

Another substantial residential development was the construction, in 1854–1856, of Carrara on the harbour foreshores. Carrara was designed by John Frederick Hilly for John Hosking, the first Lord Mayor of Sydney. The house featured verandahs with Doric columns and was situated to take advantage of the harbour views. Its name was changed to Strickland House in 1915, when it was turned into a convalescent home for women.

By 1871, the colony was experiencing the "Russian scare" that prevailed at the time, as a result of which fortifications were built at Steel Point, just a little north-west of Carrara. Cannon emplacements, powder magazine and embrasures, plus a store and barrack rooms, were constructed at this strategic point overlooking the harbour. The buildings were made of sandstone found at the site and still survive today; they are listed on the Register of the National Estate.

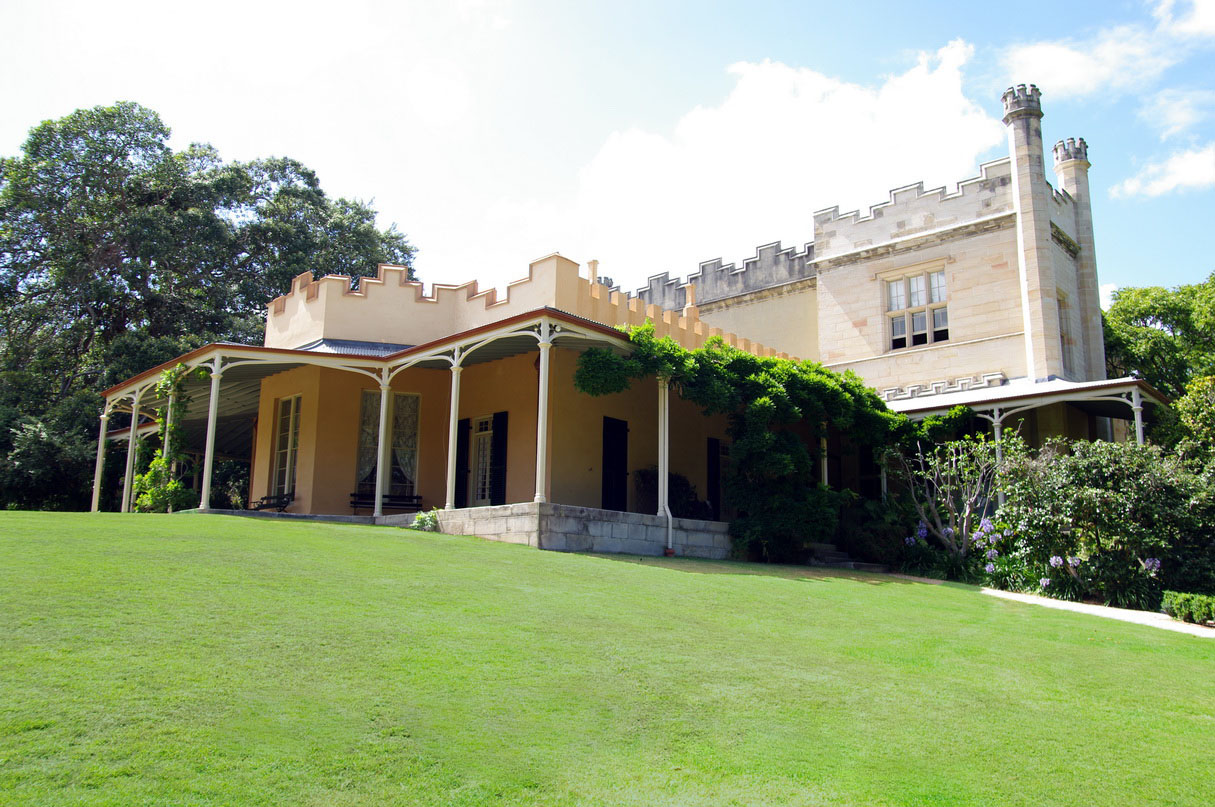
Vaucluse House

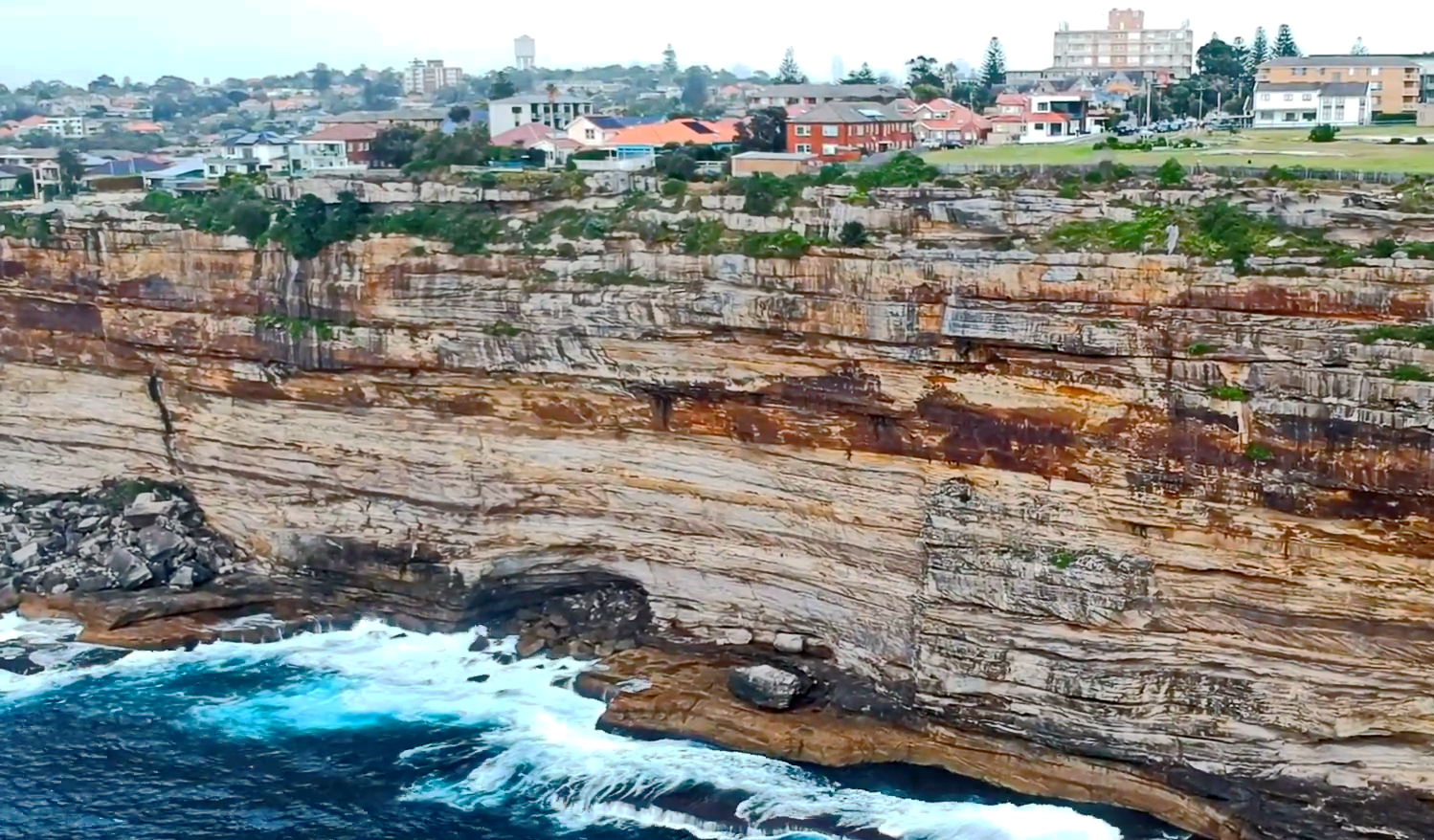
Vaucluse clifftop homes

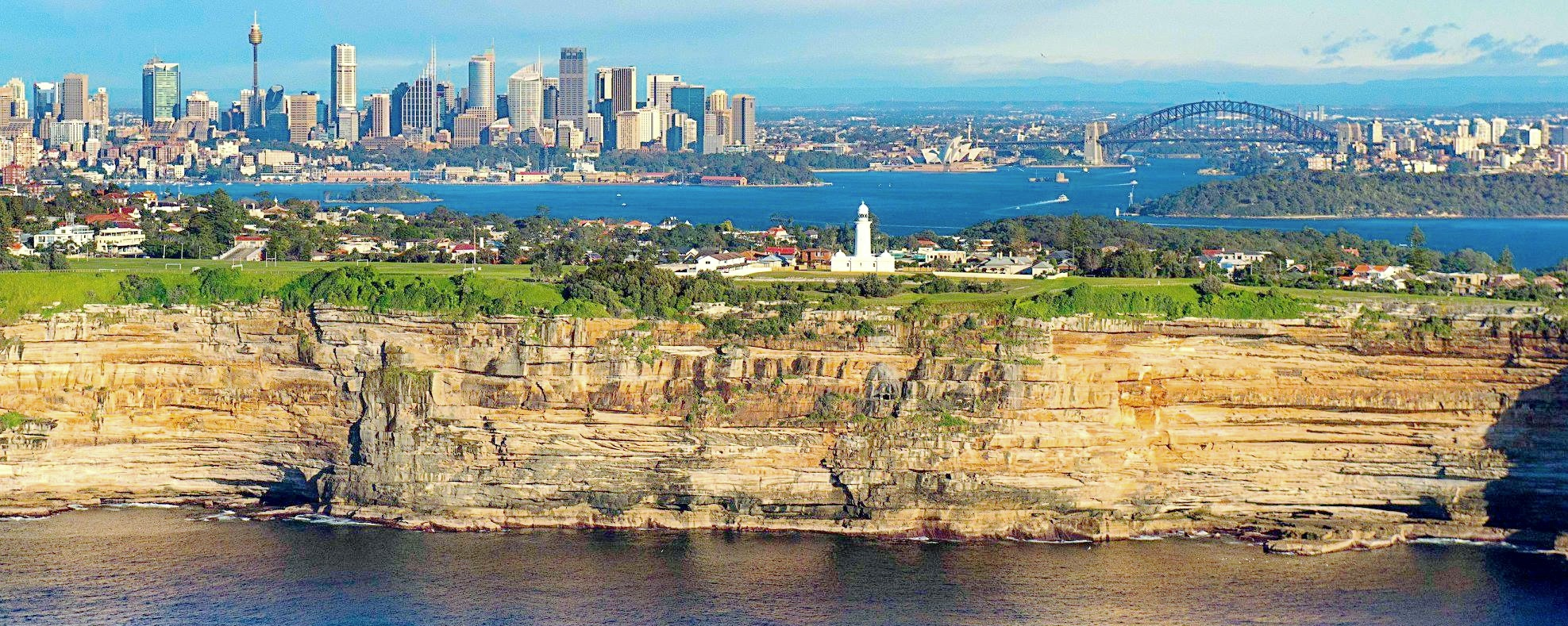
View of Vaucluse from the Tasman Sea

Not long afterwards, Mortimer Lewis was designing a tomb for the Wentworth family. William Charles Wentworth died in England in 1872 and his remains were interred in the Victorian Gothic mausoleum that was constructed in Chapel Road, Vaucluse. Made of sandstone, the building featured a stained glass window in the west end and a clerestory window above the door.

Around about the same time, Edward Mason Hunt was busy designing a Victorian Gothic mansion south of Carrara. This two-storey sandstone home incorporated a much smaller home built at that site by Alexander Dick, circa 1840; that home changed hands in 1868 and enlargement proceeded. The new mansion, known as The Hermitage, featured multiple gables, a castellated tower and prominent fretwork. It was damaged by fire in 1936 but was restored by Emil Sodersten. It was bought in 1964 by the Woolworths company, which used it for some time as a training facility.

Just a little East of The Hermitage, St Michael's Church of England went up in 1877, after being designed by Edmund Blacket. Located in St Michael's Place, this new sandstone church would later be enlarged in the 1930s, with the addition of a new spire, by Professor Leslie Wilkinson. The new design would eventually win the Sir John Sulman Medal for architecture in 1942. In 1928, the largest property purchase in the history of Vaucluse was completed by Bariston and Decima Ashton joining 8 adjoining blocks into one large single block of 2.25 acres. This record was surpassed in 2011 with the Department of Foreign Affairs purchase of 3 acres in lower Vaucluse.

By the 1880s, Greenway's Macquarie Lighthouse was in bad repair. In 1883, the Colonial Architect of the day, James Barnet, built a new lighthouse which was virtually a perfect replica of the original one, and the original was demolished. Other buildings making up the group were the assistant lighthouse keepers' cottages, built circa 1881, and Greenway's keeper's cottage, dating from circa 1840. There are also remains of courtyards to earlier cottages and the stone base wall of the original lighthouse. The entire group is listed on the Register of the National Estate.

=== Former military sites ===
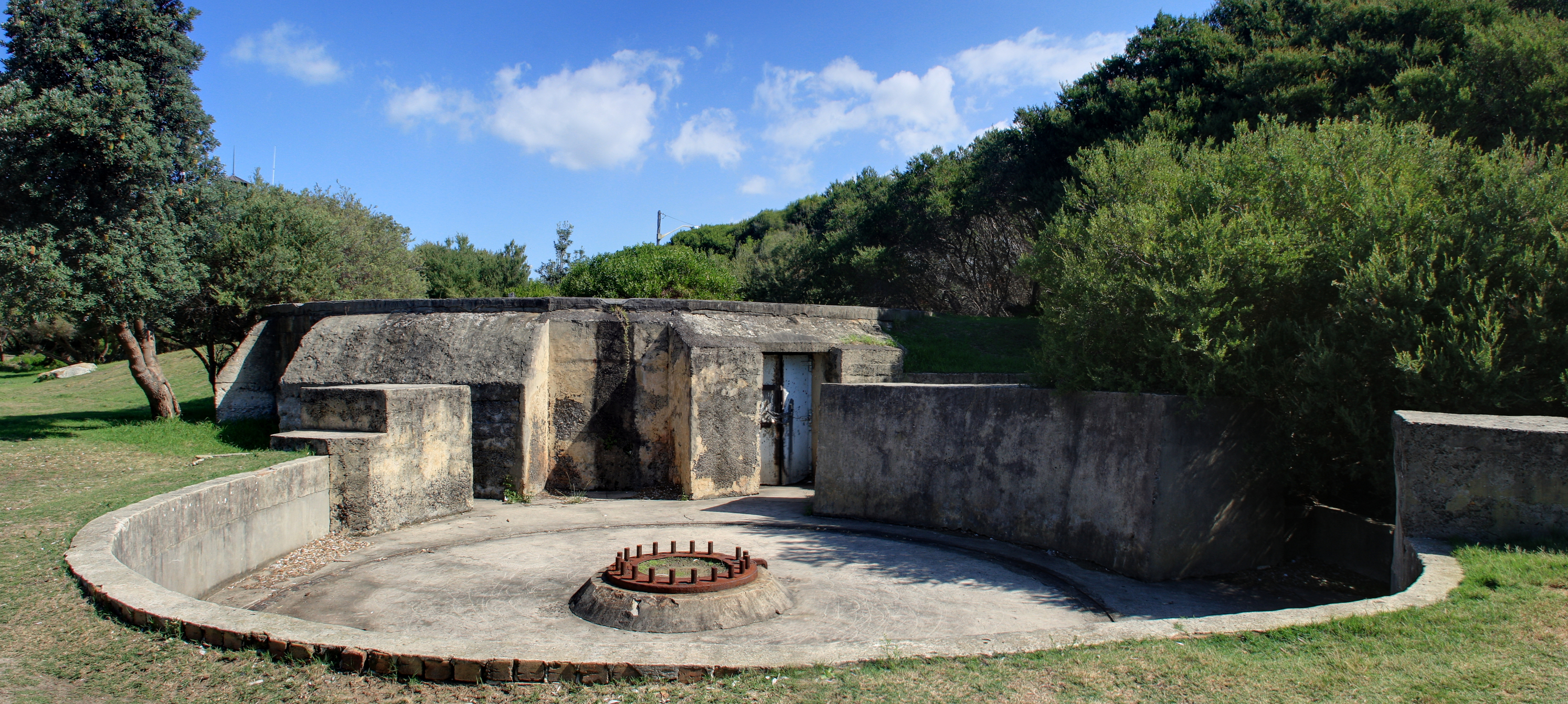
Signal Hill Battery

Several defensive fortifications are located on the shores and cliff tops of Vaucluse, such as the Signal Hill Battery, constructed in 1892; it was intended to defend the town of Sydney from bombardment by an enemy vessel standing off the coast. Although the fortification has been heavily vandalised, it is still intact and lies adjacent to the Signal Hill, signal station.

The Steel Point fortification in Nielsen Park was constructed in 1871; it originally accommodated three 80-pounder rifled muzzle-loaders (RMLs) that were replaced in the 1890s with 5 inch breech-loading guns. The fortification was built at a time when fears of a Russian attack seemed imminent, as well as other concerns such as withdrawal of British garrison troops, threats to British dependencies and increasing self-reliance in defence matters. The battery consisted of three sandstone gun emplacements with embrasures for the guns to fire through. The gun emplacements were connected to underground chambers, as well as a gunpowder magazine, by open passages and underground passageways leading into the complex.

In the 1950s, the RAN degaussing station was constructed over part of the Steel Point fortification. The degaussing station was a countermeasure against magnetic mines. Shark Island was used for this purpose during World War II. Naval ships would pass over cables laid under the harbour and were effectively demagnetized.

== Heritage listings ==
Vaucluse has a number of heritage-listed sites, including:

- 793 Old South Head Road: South Head General Cemetery
- 32b Fitzwilliam Road: Wentworth Memorial Church
- Chapel Road: Wentworth Mausoleum
- Greycliffe Avenue: Nielsen Park
- Old South Head Road: Macquarie Lighthouse
- 52 Vaucluse Road: Strickland House, Vaucluse
- 69a Wentworth Road: Vaucluse House
- Vaucluse Road: Greycliffe House

== Demographics ==
At the 2021 census, 9,510 people were recorded in Vaucluse. 58.7% of people were born in Australia, the next most common countries of birth included South Africa 8.0%, England 5.2%, China (excluding Special Administrative Regions and Taiwan) 3.2%, New Zealand 1.7% and the United States of America 1.3%. 75.9% of people only spoke English at home, the next most common languages spoken at home included Mandarin 3.4%, Greek 2.5%, Hebrew 1.4%, Russian 1.3%, and Spanish 1.3%. The most common responses for religious affiliation included No Religion 27.4%, Judaism 24.0%, Catholic 18.3% and Anglican 10.1%, a further 6.5% of respondents elected not to disclose their religion. The average incomes in Vaucluse were $3,418 household compared to $1,746 nationally, $1,393 personal compared to $805 nationally, and $4,560 for families compared to $2,120 nationally. Median monthly mortgage repayments were $4,200. Types of dwellings in Vaucluse consisted primarily of separate houses at 48.4%, there was a similar amount of flats or apartments at 40.4%, other housing types in Vaucluse included semi-detached, row or terrace house, townhouse etc at 8.4%, and all other dwellings at 2.1%.

== Landmarks ==
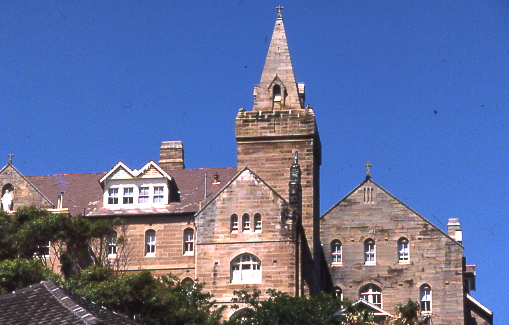
Sacred Heart Convent

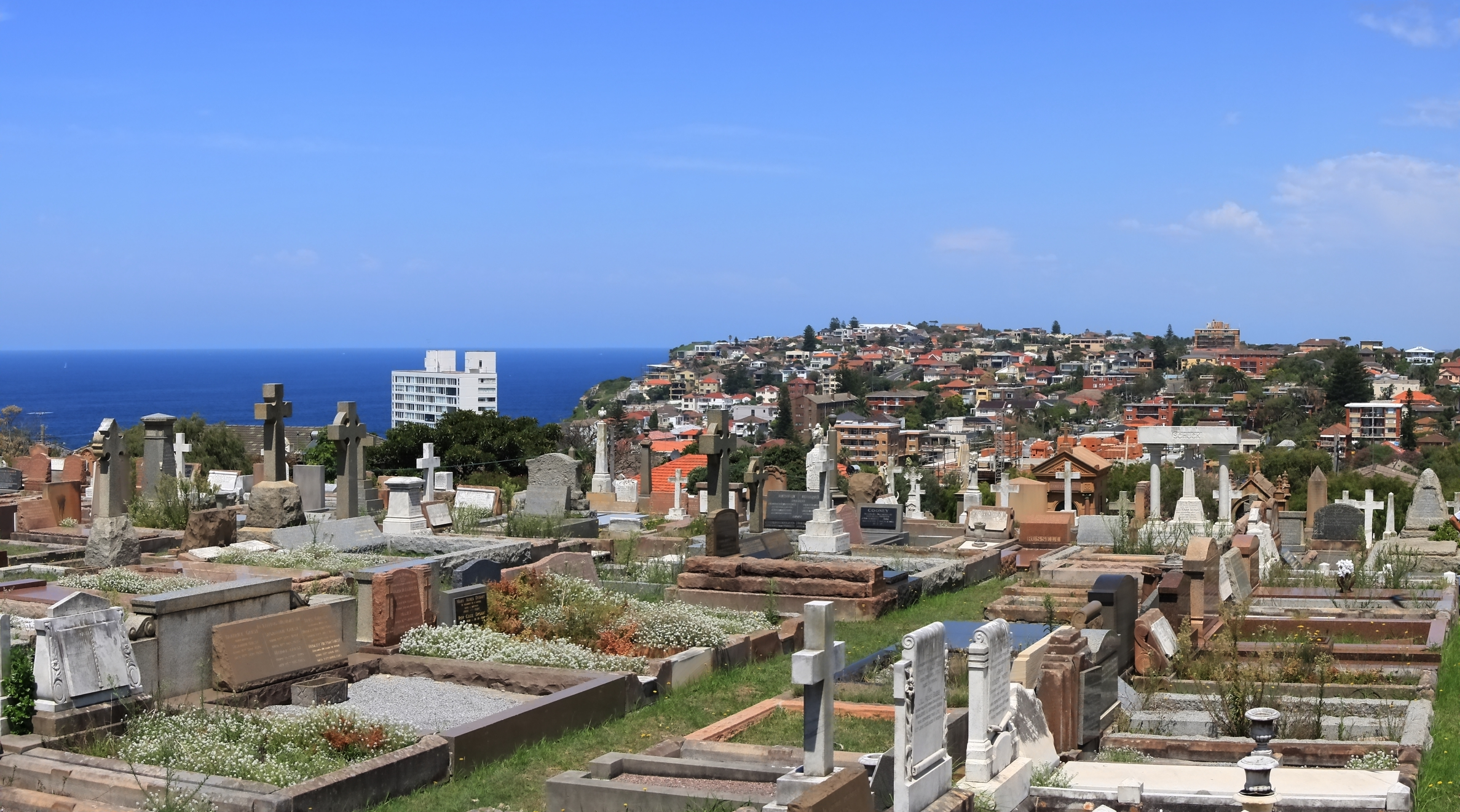
General view of South Head Cemetery

The Macquarie Lighthouse sits prominently on the eastern side of the suburb, at Dunbar Head. Vaucluse House is an historic home managed by the Historic Houses Trust. It is situated in Wentworth Road, with views across Sydney Harbour.

=== South Head Cemetery ===
South Head General Cemetery is situated at the junction of New South Head Road and Old South Head Road in Vaucluse. The cemetery is administered by Waverley Council and is a companion cemetery to the Waverley Cemetery at Bronte.

The cemetery was established in 1868 to cater for the needs of the population in the growing Vaucluse area. It was run for some time by a private trust, but management was transferred to Waverley Council in 1941. It covers an expanse of 1.6 hectares (4 acres) and contains the graves of 6,000 people as of 2008. There are a number of well-known people interred at the cemetery including Australia's first Prime Minister, Sir Edmund Barton.

Architect John Horbury Hunt's last commission was a memorial to Sir John Robertson, former Premier of New South Wales. The memorial is shaped like a cone with two sections, the bottom of which commemorates Robertson's wife, while the top half commemorates Robertson himself. Also interred in this cemetery are members of the Fairfax, Norton, Packer, and Street families; and NSW Governors Sir Walter Edward Davidson and Sir Roden Cutler. The cemetery also contains the graves of 22 of the forty victims of the 1927 Greycliffe ferry disaster.

== Notable residents ==
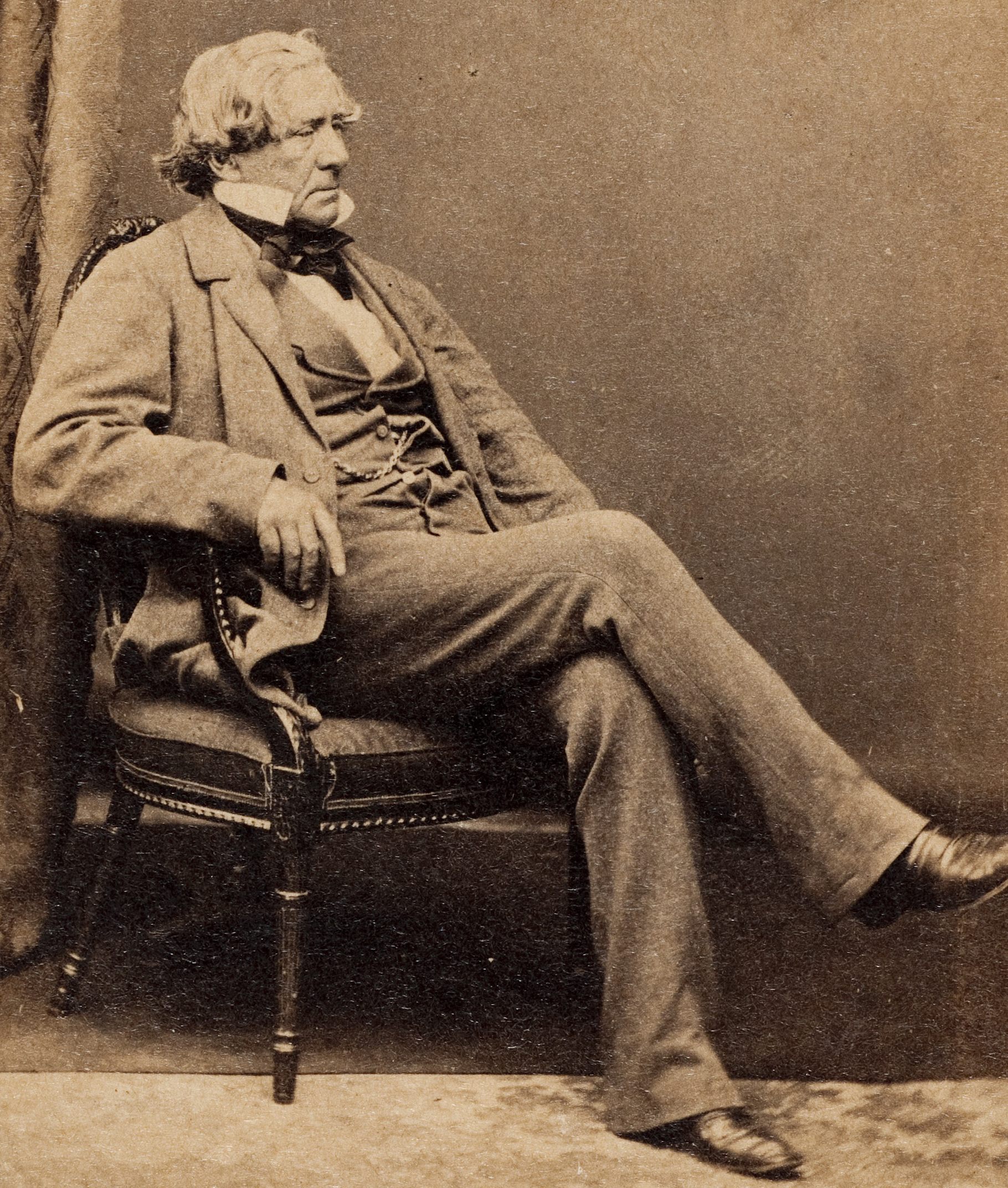
William Charles Wentworth, colonial-era Australian statesman

- Henry Browne Hayes (1762–1832), Irish-born convict transported to New South Wales, owner of Vaucluse House
- William Charles Wentworth (1790–1872), statesman, pastoralist, explorer, newspaper editor, lawyer, politician and owner of Vaucluse House
- Edwin Sautelle (1872–1946), town clerk and mayor of Vaucluse
- Ted Greatorex (1901–1964), rugby union player
- Janette Howard (born 1944), wife of Prime Minister John Howard
- Henry George Nicholls (c. 1852 – 1936), minister
- Ezra Norton (1897–1967), newspaper baron and businessman
- Stuart Robinson (born 1959), former Bishop of Canberra-Goulburn
- Rod Sims (born 1950), former chair of the Australian Competition & Consumer Commission (ACCC)
- Steven Solomon (born 1993), Olympic sprinter
- David Horwitz (born 1994), former Rugby Union player. Flyhalf/Centre for Australian schoolboys, Australian Under 20s, NSW Waratahs and Connacht Rugby. First player of Jewish faith to play Super Rugby.

== Gallery ==
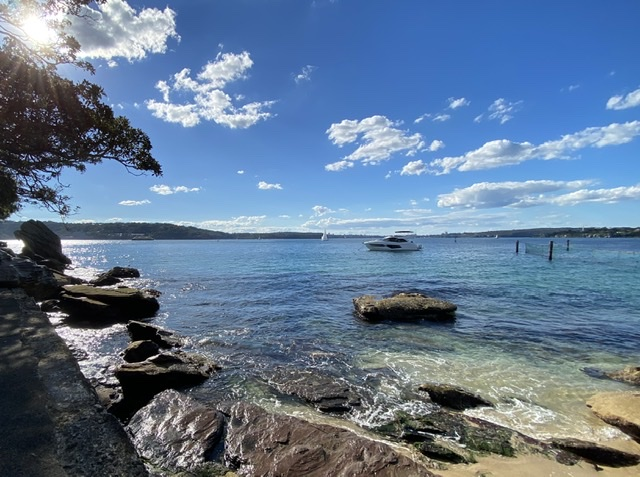
Shark Beach at Nielsen Park

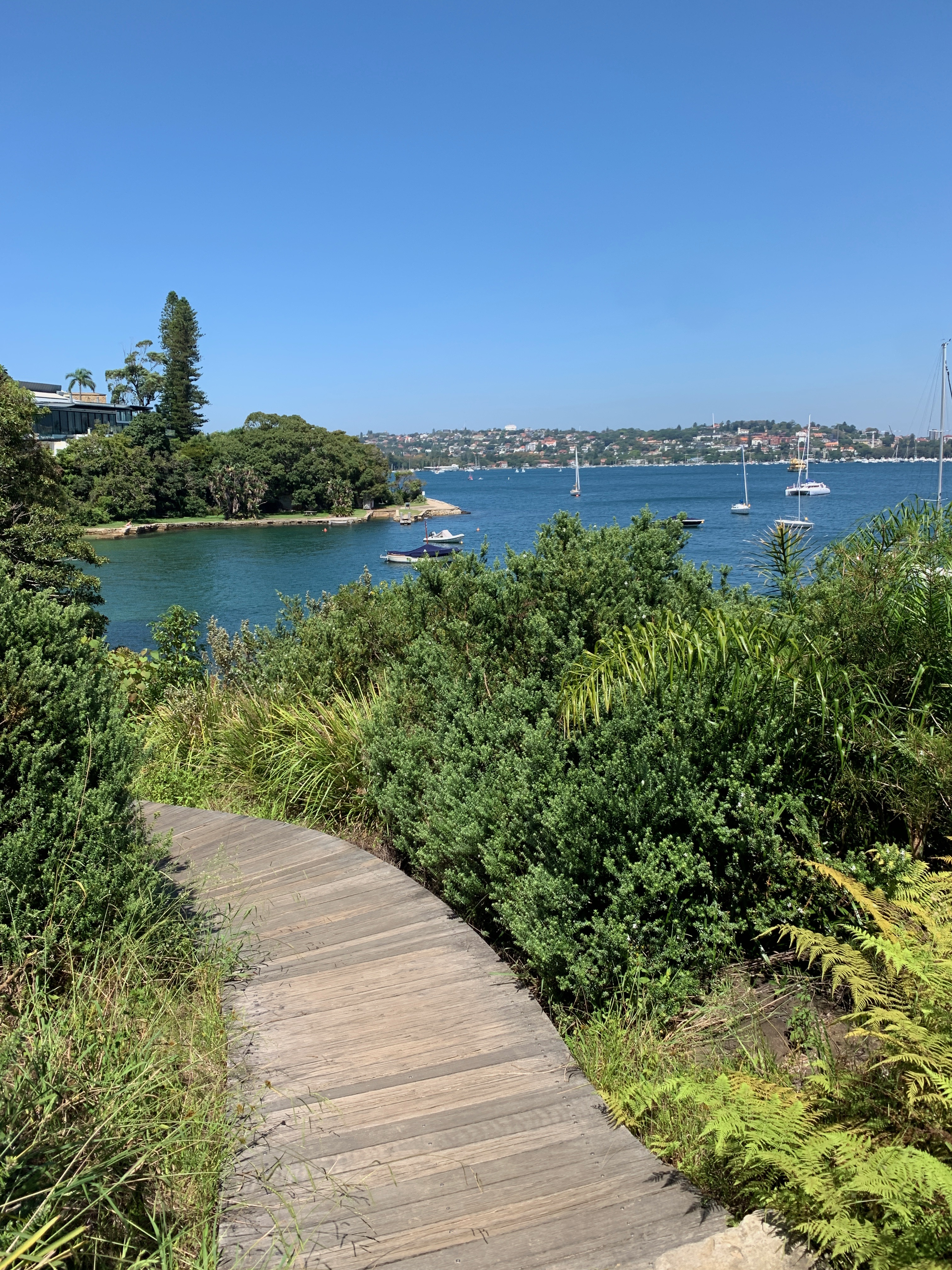
The Hermitage Foreshore track at Milk Beach

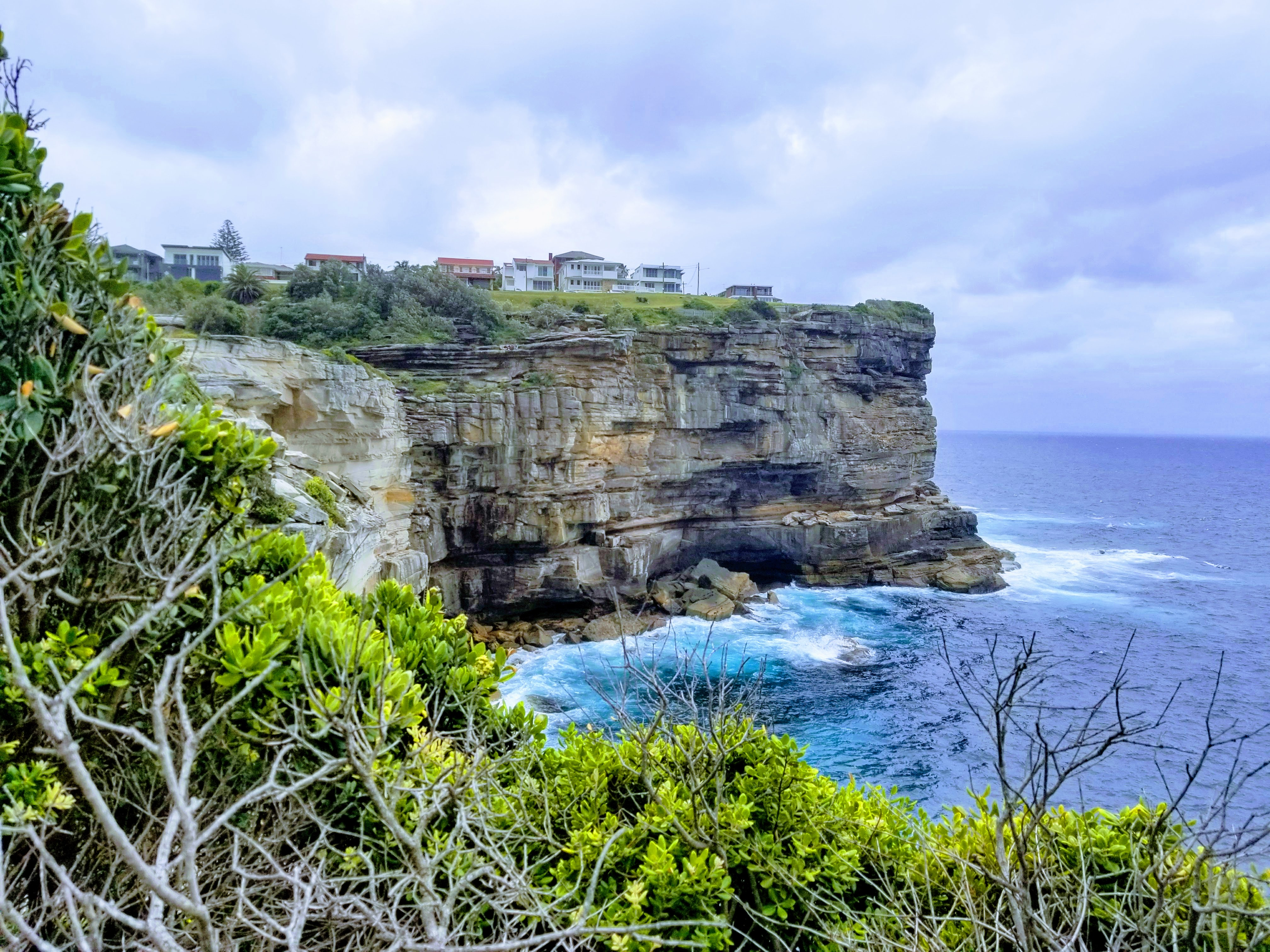
Diamond Bay Reserve

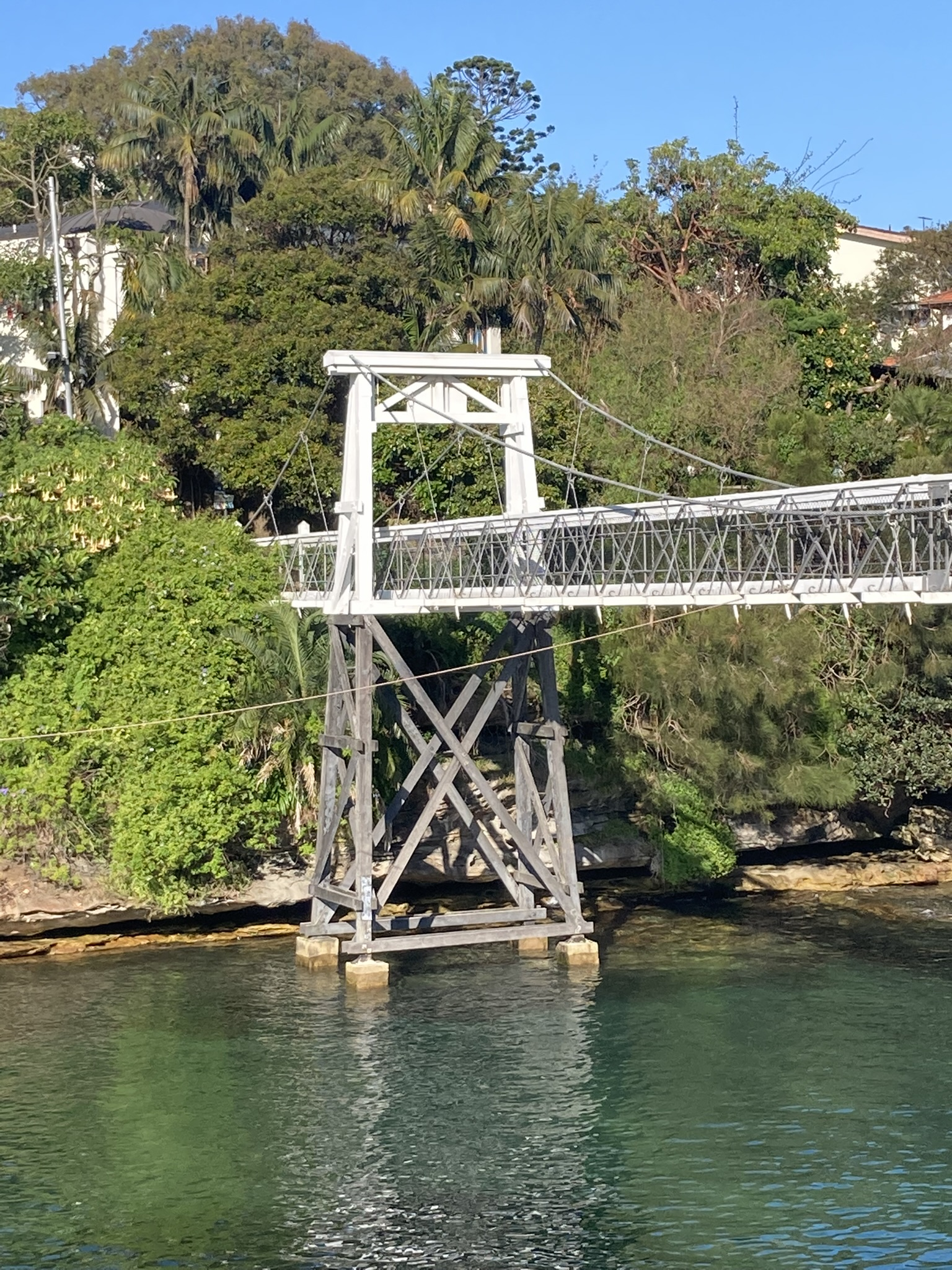
Parsely Bay suspension bridge

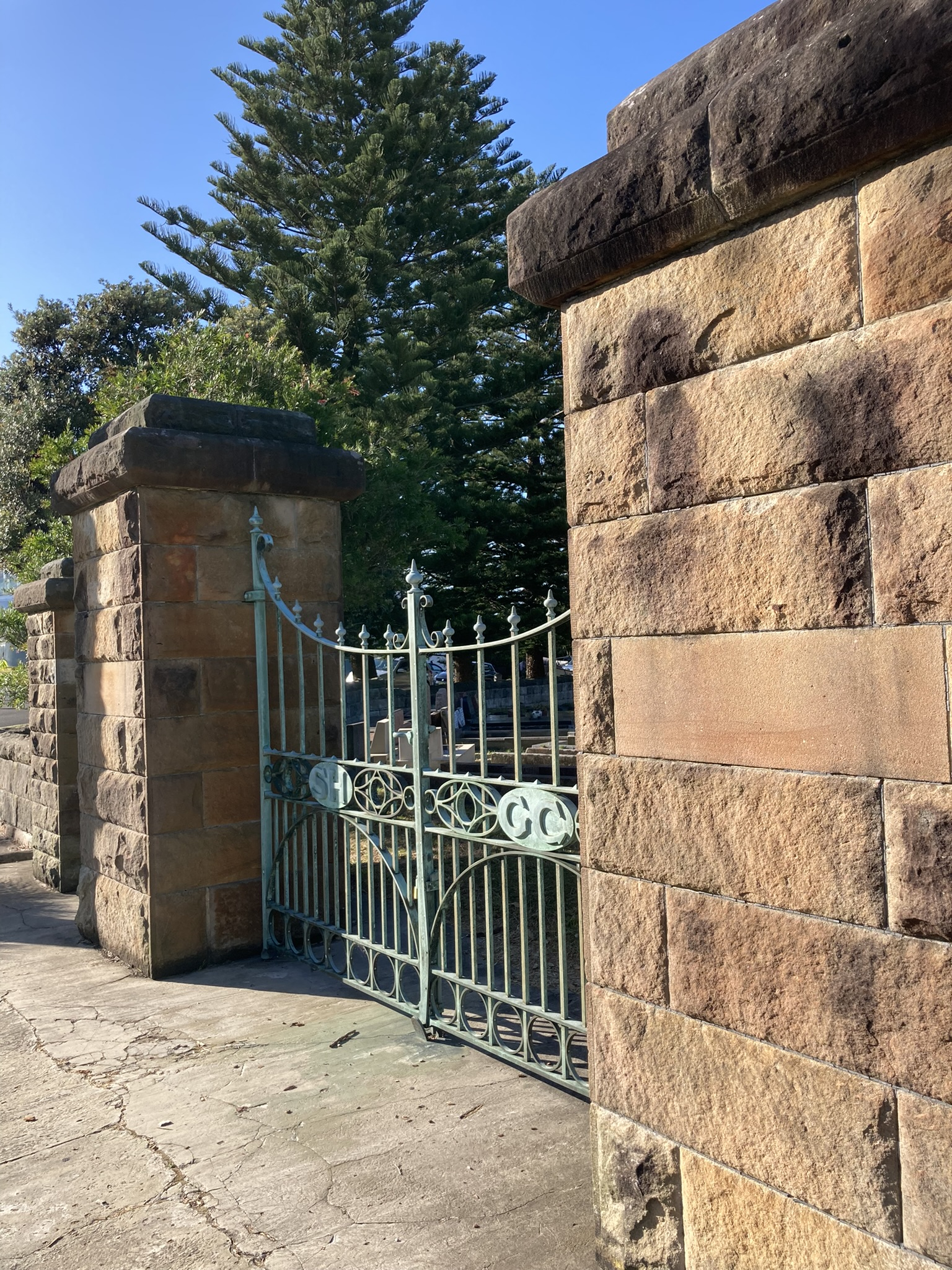
South Head General Cemetery

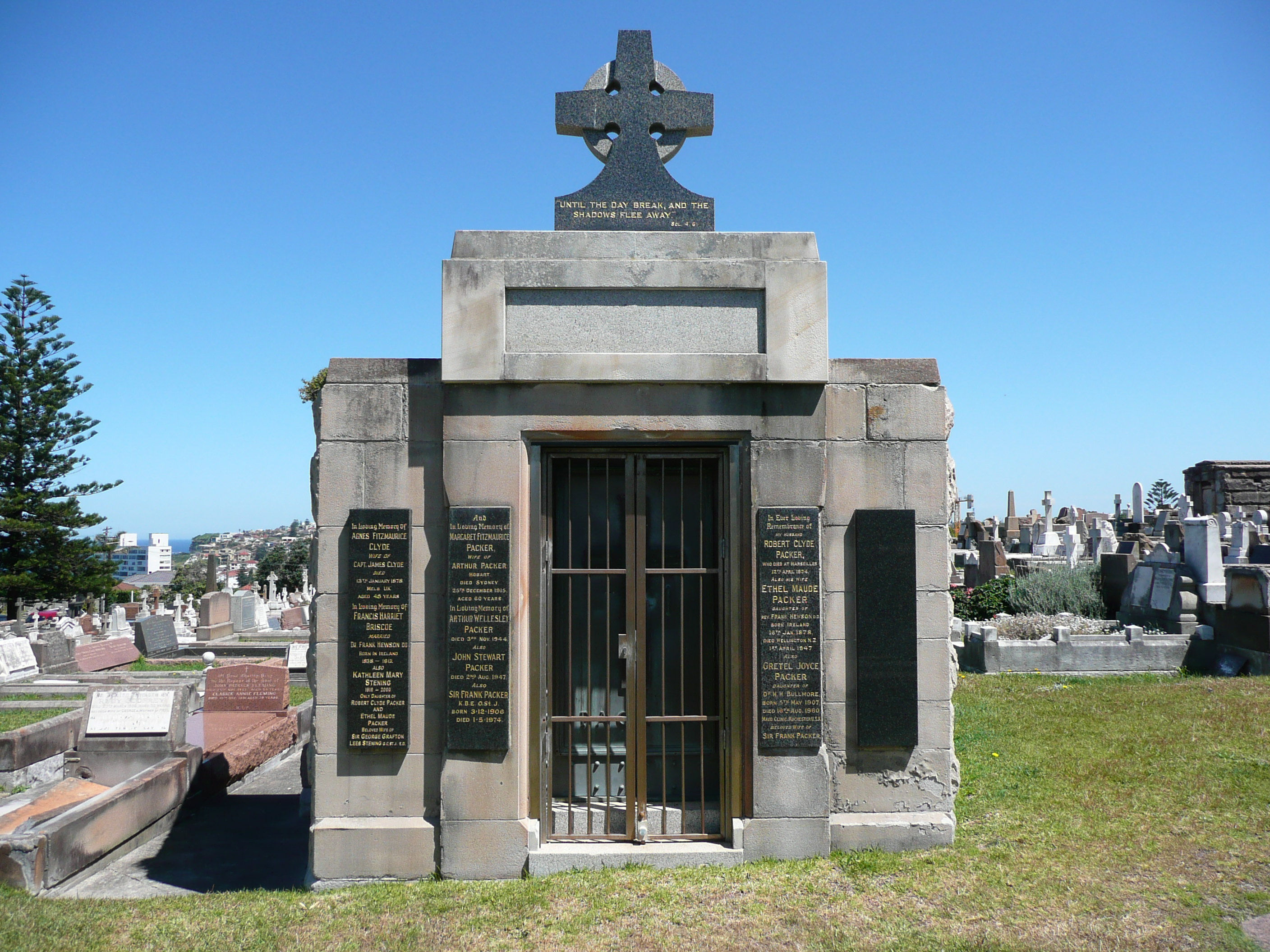
Packer family tomb

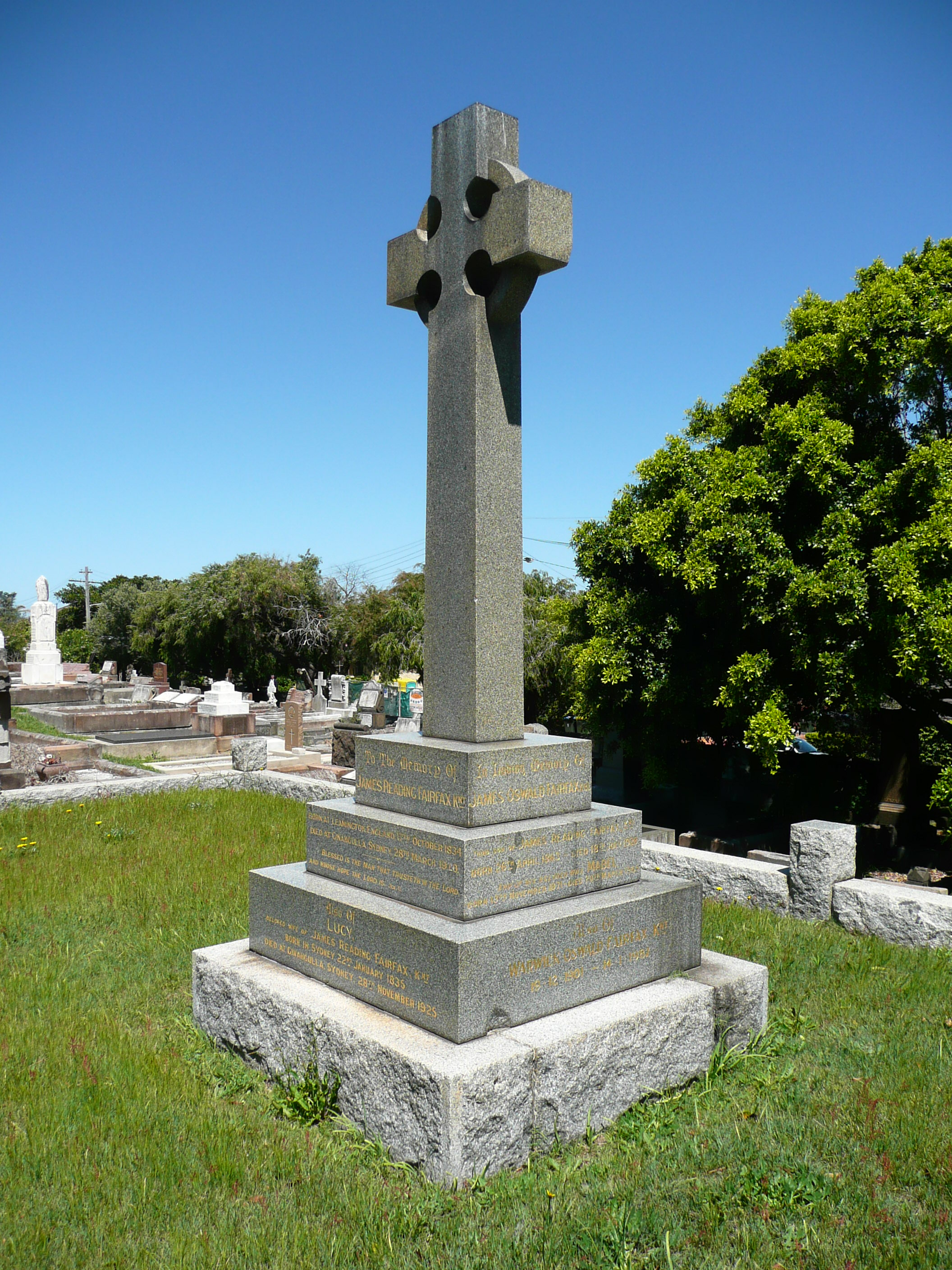
Fairfax family plot

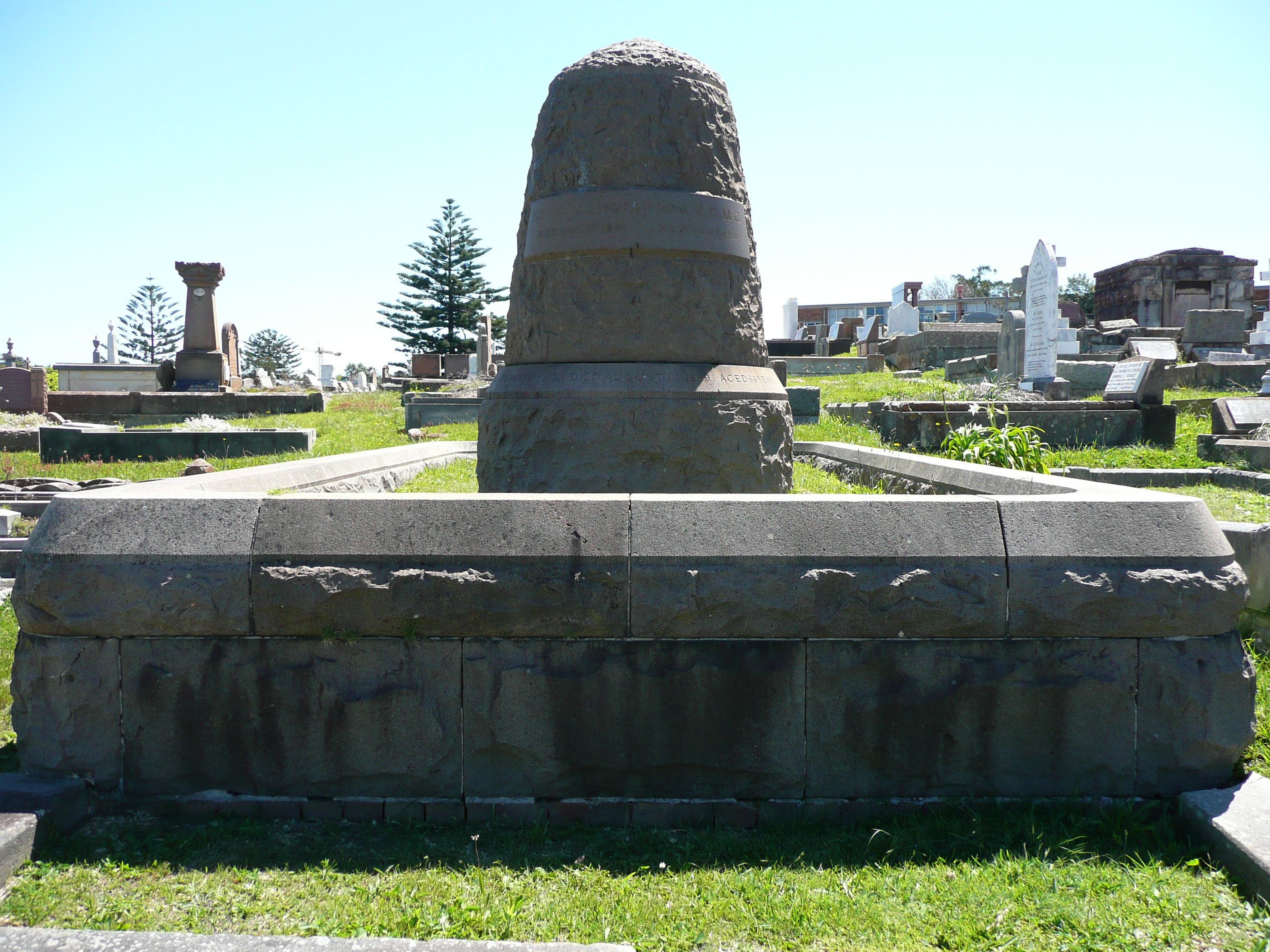
Sir John Robertson grave, designed by John Horbury Hunt

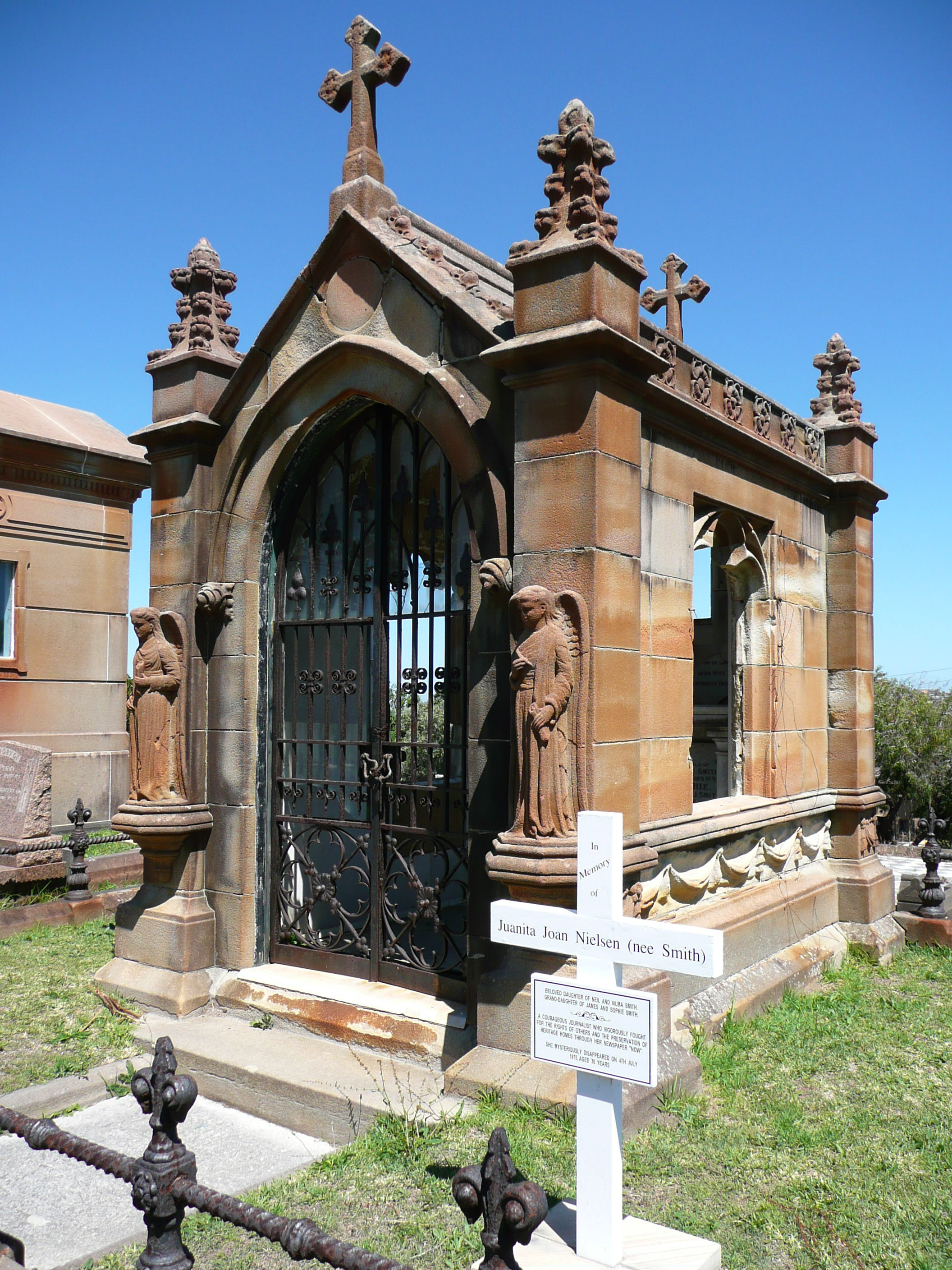
Memorial for Juanita Nielsen

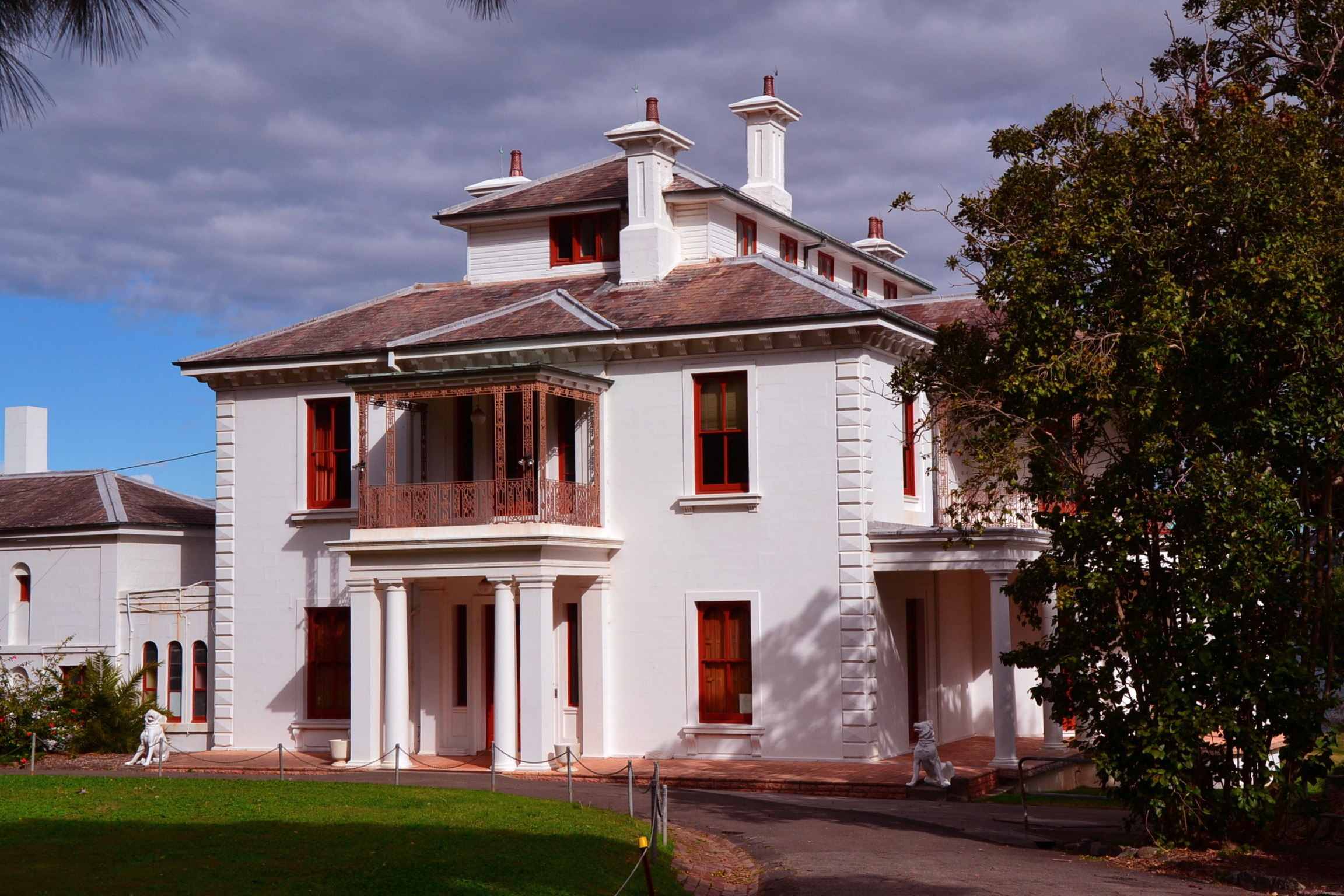
Strickland House

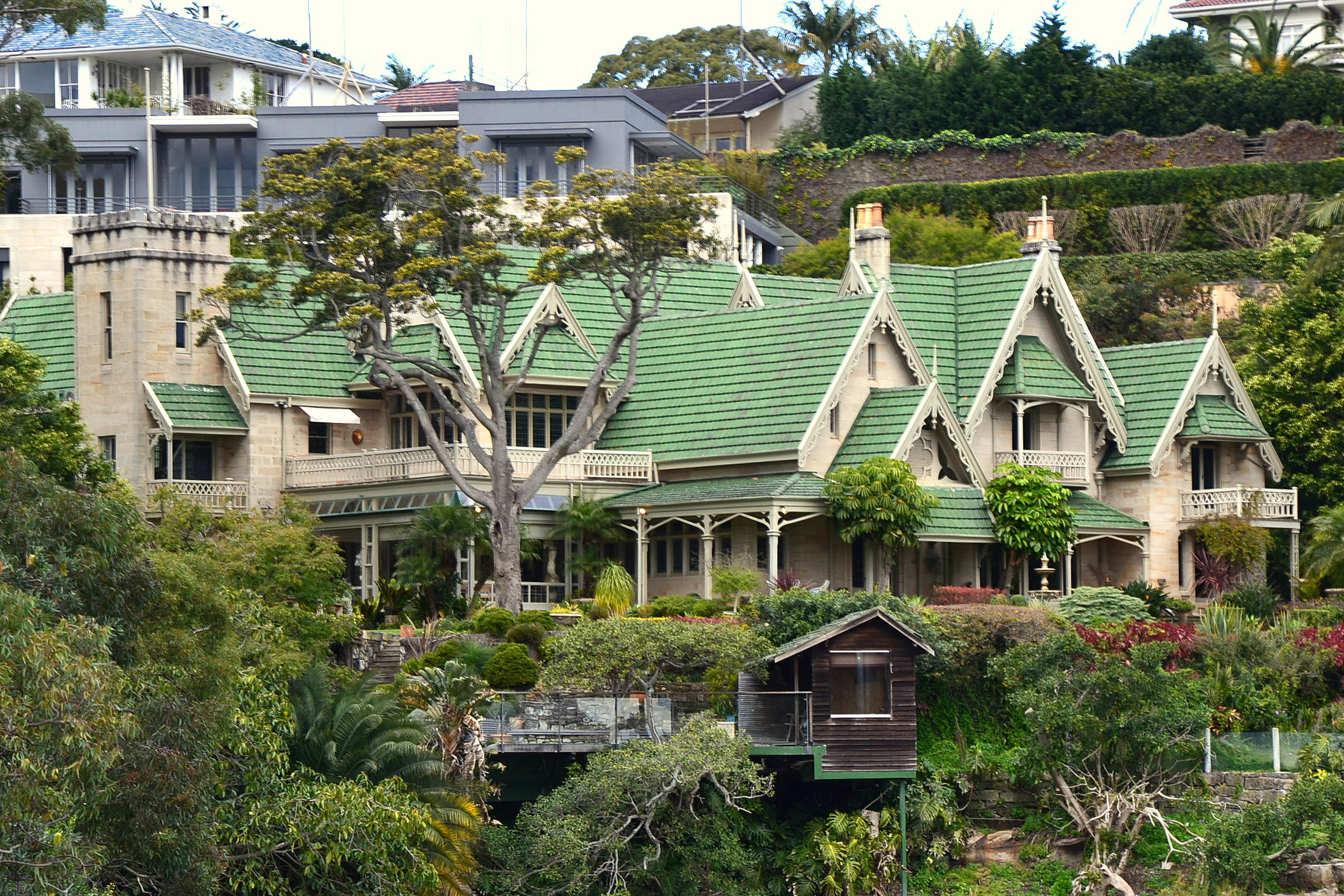
The Hermitage

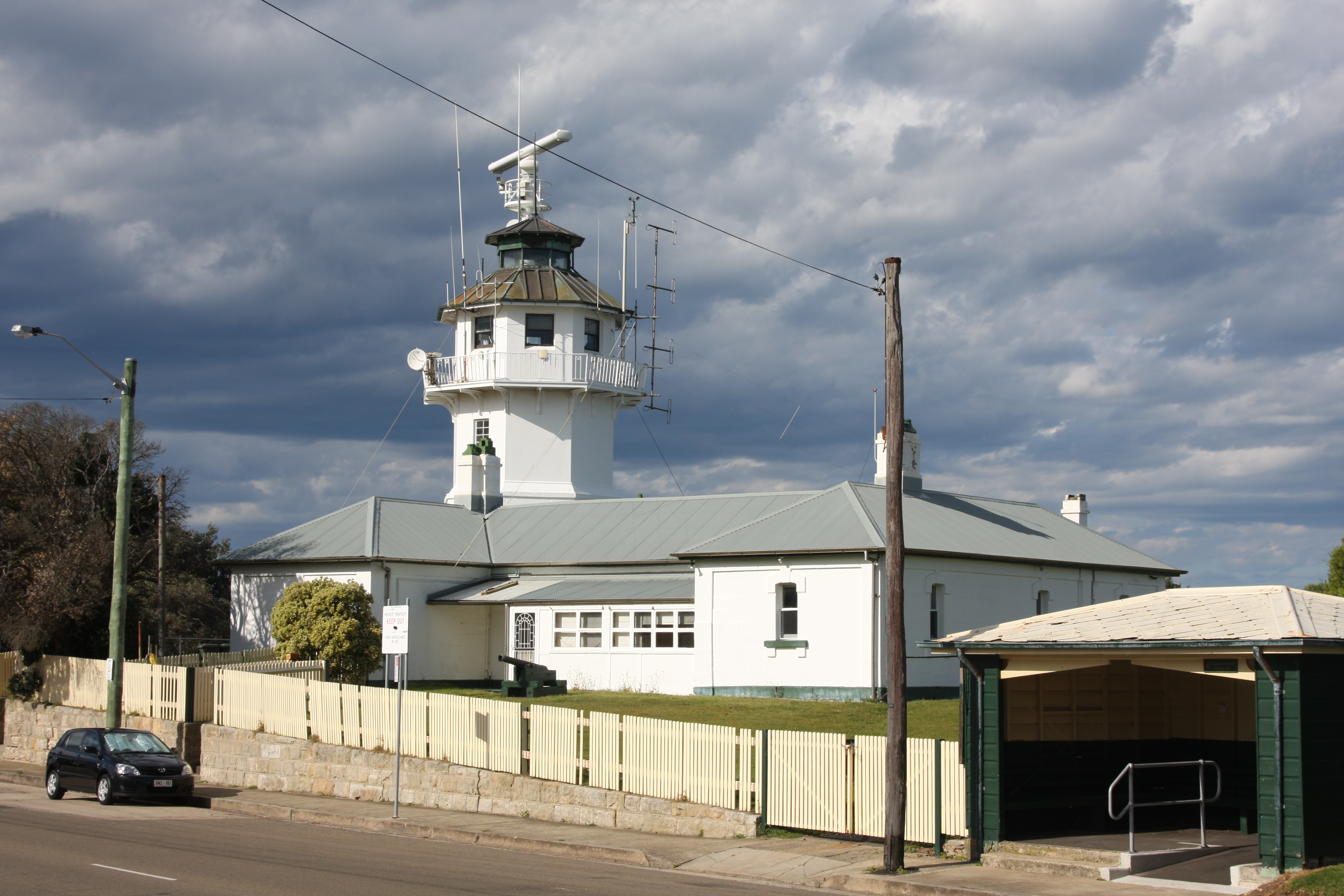
Signal Station, Old South Head Road
