= The Hermitage, Vaucluse =

The Hermitage
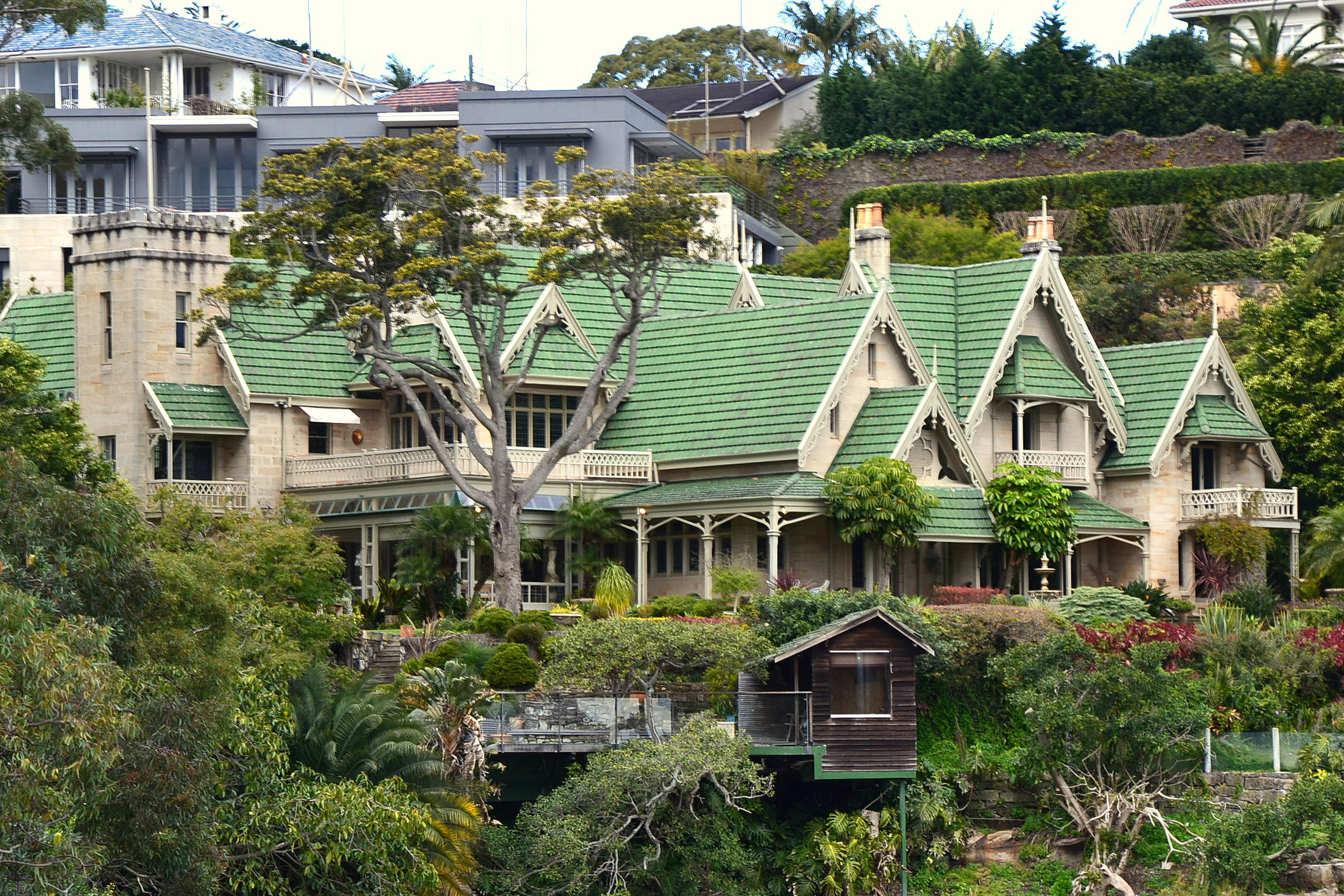
- The Hermitage, Vaucluse

- Location within east Sydney

General information
- Status: Completed
- Type: House
- Architectural style: Victorian Rustic Gothic
- Location: 22 Vaucluse Road, Vaucluse, New South Wales, Australia
- Coordinates: 33°51′33″S 151°16′09″E
- Construction started: 1870
- Completed: 1878

Technical details
- Material: Sydney sandstone

Design and construction
- Architects: Alexander Dick (1840 house); Edward Mason Hunt (1870-1878 works); Emil Sodersten (1936 works)

Register of the National Estate
- Official name: The Hermitage
- Designated: 21 October 1980
- Reference no.: 2499

New South Wales Heritage Database (Local Government Register)
- Official name: The Hermitage
- Type: Built
- Designated: 10 March 1995
- Reference no.: Local register

The Hermitage is a historic house in the Sydney suburb of Vaucluse, New South Wales, Australia. It is listed on the (now defunct) Australian Register of the National Estate as well as the Municipality of Woollahra local government heritage list.

== History and description ==
The main house was designed and built around 1870-1878 in the Victorian Rustic Gothic style by Edward Mason Hunt, influenced by the design of Roslyndale, in Woollahra, New South Wales. It features a castellated tower, elaborately carved barge boards and a roof of multiple gables. The house was seriously damaged by a fire in 1936, and was restored by Emil Sodersten. It was bought by the Woolworths conglomerate in 1964 and used as a staff training centre, but later returned to its original role as a private home. This Gothic house overlooks Hermitage Reserve and has harbour views. The Hermitage incorporates a smaller house, which was built c. 1840 by Alexander Dick.

The Hermitage is owned by the family of Justin Hemmes.
