= Edwin Sautelle =

Australian politician

8th Mayor of Vaucluse
- In office 4 February 1914 – 10 February 1916
- Preceded by: Adam Forsyth
- Succeeded by: George Thomas Stowe
- In office January 1921 – December 1921
- Preceded by: Henry David Alexander Christison
- Succeeded by: James McIntyre

Personal details
- Born: 10 May 1872 Yass, New South Wales Australia
- Died: 1947 (aged 74–75) Sydney, New South Wales, Australia
- Spouse: Lizzie (née Christison)
- Children: Three sons
- Education: Newington College
- Occupation: Civil engineer

Edwin Stanhope Sautelle (1872 – 1947) was an Australian civil engineer who was Town Clerk and later mayor of the Municipality of Vaucluse.

== Early life ==
Sautelle was born in Yass, New South Wales, the second son of Ellen (née Besnard) and Edwin Sautelle. His father was an English born surveyor and his mother was Irish born. His brother was the grazier and champion polo player John Besnard Sautelle who was President of Bibbenluke Shire Council. Sautelle attended Fort Street Public School and then Newington College from 1886 until 1892.

== Career ==
As a civil engineer he was town clerk at Vaucluse Council and designed the Parsley Bay suspension bridge. He later became an alderman on Vaucluse Council, serving twice as mayor. In 1895 he was appointed secretary of the South Head General Cemetery Trust. He designed the stone gates at the entrance to the cemetery. In 1938 he was charged with forgery and larceny after misappropriating cemetery funds and sentenced to three years in gaol.

Civic offices
New title	Town Clerk of Vaucluse; 1895 – 1911	Succeeded by Christopher Joseph Ward
Preceded by Adam Forsyth	Mayor of Vaucluse; 1914 – 1916	Succeeded by George Thomas Stowe
Preceded by Henry David Alexander Christison	Mayor of Vaucluse; Jan–Dec 1921	Succeeded by James McIntyre
