= South Head General Cemetery =

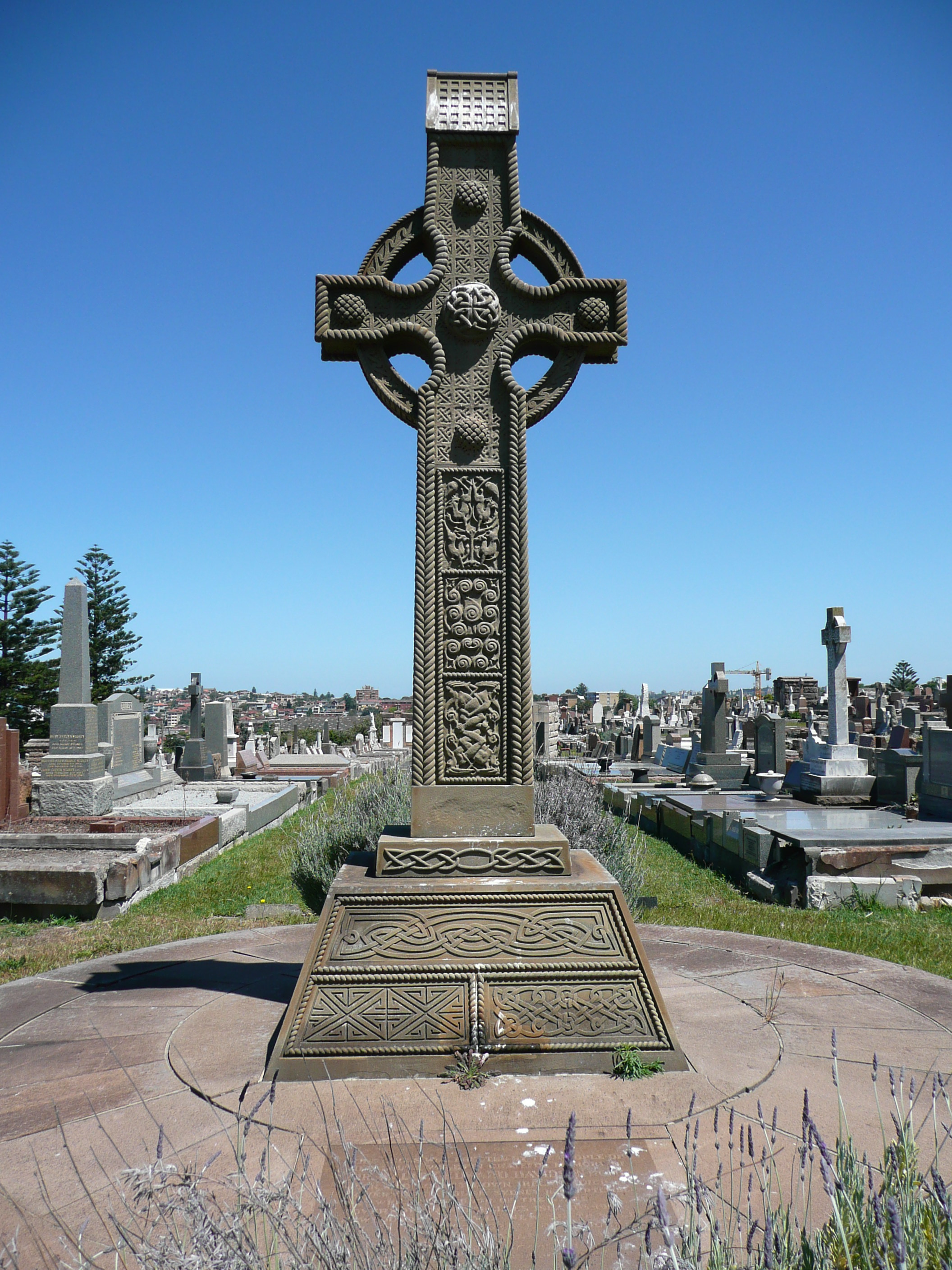
- Celtic cross on the grave of Sir Walter Edward Davidson, pictured in 2008

- Location within east Sydney Location within Australia
- 33°51′30″S 151°16′54″E
- Location: 793 Old South Head Road, Vaucluse, New South Wales, Australia

History
- Built: 1868–1950

Site notes
- Owner: Waverley Municipal Council

New South Wales Heritage Register
- Official name: South Head General Cemetery; Old South Head Cemetery
- Type: State heritage (landscape)
- Designated: 25 August 2017
- Reference no.: 1991
- Type: Cemetery/Graveyard/Burial Ground
- Category: Cemeteries and Burial Sites

The South Head General Cemetery is a heritage-listed cemetery located at 793 Old South Head Road, Vaucluse, New South Wales, Australia. It was built from 1845 to 1950. It is also known as Old South Head Cemetery and the South Head Cemetery. The property is Crown Land governed by Waverley Municipal Council. It was added to the New South Wales State Heritage Register on 25 August 2017.

== History ==
=== Indigenous history ===
South Head General Cemetery is located on the land of the Birrabirragal clan of the Dharug nation. As with most Aboriginal groups in Australia prior to European colonisation, the Birrabirragal people lived a traditional hunter-gatherer lifestyle that utilised the natural resources available in their environment to achieve the physical and spiritual nourishment to sustain their way of life. Evidence of the area's occupation by the Birrabirragal people is found in nearby areas such as Nielsen Park (Vaucluse), Cooper Park (Bellevue Hill) and Bondi.

=== Colonial history ===
European exploration into the coastal region of eastern Sydney commenced in 1790 with the establishment of a signal station at South Head. A road from Sydney to South Head was built in 1811, and in 1816 a lighthouse was constructed at the signal station. This road became known as Old South Head Road when New South Head Road was built in the 1830s. Old South Head Road runs along the western side of the cemetery and meets New South Head Road near the entrance gates.

In 1841 the Reverend Lancelot Threlkeld became the Congregationalist minister at South Head, and requested the Governor make a land grant for a cemetery. The parish at that time consisted mainly of the fishing village of Watsons Bay. A land grant was reportedly made to Threlkeld by Governor Gipps in 1845. The Sydney Morning Herald noted on 9 September 1845: 'His Excellency the Governor has been pleased, in answer to a memorial from the inhabitants of South Head, to grant one acre of land for the purpose of a general cemetery for the interment of the dead, without any restrictions as to the religious persuasion of the deceased.'

Little can be gleaned from the documents of the cemetery on activities of the early Trust prior 1895 as the cemetery claims no records have survived. This leaves a gap in the record and provides a challenge to those today searching for people known to have been buried at South Head.

There is no evidence in newspapers of any burials in the cemetery before 1868 when the burial occurred on 27 February of Major Lee, a resident of Vaucluse. As this is the earliest burial that there is proof of. It is very likely that the Cemetery had many burials between 1845 and 1895.

Some earlier deaths were commemorated on later monuments, such as James Green, captain of the Dunbar which was wrecked off South Head in 1857. He is named on the gravestone of his brother Malcolm who died in 1904. In addition, a small number of earlier graves were moved to South Head Cemetery from the Devonshire Street Cemetery in 1901 at the time of the construction of Central railway station.

In the lands Dedication Book held at the State Archives, the first recorded trustees were appointed in 1870 by the Minister for Lands, Sir John Robertson. They were Thomas John Fisher (1813–1875, barrister and son-in-law of William Charles Wentworth of Vaucluse House), Joseph Scaife Willis (1808–1897, resident of "Greycliffe", Vaucluse), George Thorne (1810–1891, resident of "Claremont", now part of Rose Bay convent) and Edward Mason Hunt (1842–1899, barrister and resident of "The Hermitage", Vaucluse).

Although, it is likely that there were earlier trustees, as described in Dowd's 'History of Waverley' involved in setting out and fencing of the cemetery following the granting of land in 1845. Dowd lists these as Messrs. Siddons, Gibson, Jenkins, Bethel, Hosking and Fisher.

The original land grant of zero point four zero hectares (one acre) was formalised in 1872. This area was the south-eastern part of the present cemetery site, on the corner of Burge and Young Streets. A further area of 3 roods and 36 perches was granted in 1890, west of the original grant and on the corner of Burge Street and Old South Head Road. The final area added to the cemetery was 2 acres, 2 roods and 7 perches granted in 1902 which is to the north of the other two grants and on the corner of Old South Head Road and Young Street .

The first funeral held at South Head for a public figure was that of Margaret, wife of Sir John Robertson, on 8 August 1889. Sir John was the Premier of New South Wales in 1860–61, 1868–70, 1875–77 and 1885–86, and his parliamentary career covered over 30 years from 1856 to 1886. Also in 1889 Sir John's 82-year-old Maori servant known as John Blanket was buried within the Robertson family vault. The inscription 'Sir John's Blanket' on the kerbing has been misunderstood by some writers as referring metaphorically to Sir John's grave as a "stone blanket", rather than to a named person buried within it. Sir John was buried with his wife on 10 May 1891, and the Singleton Argus of 13 May 1891 commented: "The cemetery itself, bleak and unornamented, is a dreary enough looking place, but its appearance on Sunday afternoon, with people walking about it, was almost weird." Sir John's body was conveyed by boat from Watsons Bay to Circular Quay from where the funeral procession proceeded back to South Head by road to allow the public to pay their respects along the route.

In 1895 the Trust appointed a Secretary, Edwin Stanhope Sautelle, who was also the Clerk and Engineer of Vaucluse Borough Council which was established in that year. By then the original Trustees had been replaced by others including Harold Francis Norrie (mayor of Vaucluse and local doctor) and J. A. Murray. A sexton's cottage had been built by 1895, when a newspaper report mentioned the sexton's wife assisting a visitor seeking Sir John Robertson's grave.

=== Post-Federation ===
The tram line extension from Edgecliff to Watsons Bay opened in 1909 along New South Head Road, passing close by the cemetery. This line continued operating until 1960 when it was replaced by the 324 bus route. The tram made it easier for the public to travel to the cemetery from Sydney either to attend funerals or to visit graves.

After the death in office of New South Wales Governor Sir Walter Davidson he was buried in South Head Cemetery on 18 September 1923. Two years later in 1925, the Governor's remains were moved to the central avenue and a large Celtic cross monument was erected by public subscription. This event seems to have spurred the Trustees to undertake improvements, including the perimeter wall and gates. The main gates made from brass and bronze were designed by Edwin Sautelle and installed in 1924. An article in The Watchman newspaper on 13 August 1925 stated: 'In the last two or three years the trustees have spent over A£8,000, principally in substantial stone fences, cemented paths, etc.'

In 1926 the trustees had ambitious plans, with a proposal to expand the cemetery by acquiring around 17 acres extending south-eastwards to the coast. The Local Land Board approved the resumption of the area, but Waverley Municipal Council successfully appealed against the decision to the Land and Valuation Court. The move was opposed by Sir John Sulman, president of the Town Planning Association, who stated that the extension would block the proposed cliff walk and drive from The Gap (Watsons Bay) to Ben Buckler (North Bondi), and condemned the practice of having cemeteries in the middle of residential areas.

The South Head General Cemetery was the scene of a dramatic series of funerals in 1927, including twelve on one day, following the sinking of the ferry Greycliffe on Sydney Harbour with the loss of 40 lives. On 3 November the ferry was travelling from Circular Quay and Garden Island heading for Nielsen Park and Watsons Bay when it collided at 4.15 pm with the steamer Tahiti and sank. The 24 Greycliffe victims buried in South Head Cemetery are in individual graves.

In late 1937 Edwin Sautelle was discharged as Secretary of the Trust after 42 years' service. Along with this role he ran his own engineering firm and served on Vaucluse Council from 1912 to 1934 including three terms as Mayor. A subsequent audit revealed that up to A£40,000 was missing and in April 1938 Sautelle was charged with forging time sheets and stealing. He was convicted on six charges and sentenced to three years' imprisonment. This case signalled the end for the Trustees, and in 1939 the New South Wales parliament passed the South Head Cemetery Act which removed the trustees and authorised the Minister for Lands to appoint a single trustee in their place. The new trustee was Bruce Carlyle Hughes, the Inspector of Local Government Accounts. After two years a new group of trustees was appointed in 1941, including aldermen of Waverley and Vaucluse Councils. However less than six months later the trustees were removed and on 17 October 1941 Waverley Municipal Council was appointed sole trustee.

=== Waverley Council as trustee ===
Waverley Council has continued to operate South Head Cemetery since 1941. The sexton's cottage was demolished after 1941 to create more space for burials, and was replaced with a smaller liver-brick amenities block in the 1950s. The addition of lawn graves from the late 1960s utilised the central avenue and other paths to increase the burial space within the cemetery. In 2011 residents expressed concern at the proposed removal of tuckeroo street trees (Cupaniopsis anacardioides) which were damaging the cemetery wall facing Burge Street. Council agreed to plant replacement trees and ensure they were growing before removing the original trees in 2014.

== Notable graves ==
South Head General Cemetery contains the graves of many notable people, including:

- Henry Gibson, Captain (1809–1873) Pilot of Watson Bay starting in Oct 1840. Gibson's Beach Reserve in Watsons Bay is named for him. He was also one of the first Trustees of the South Head Cemetery upon the land being granted in 1845.
- Sir John Robertson (premier)
- Leila Waddell, also known as Laylah, (1880–1932) famed Scarlet Woman of Aleister Crowley and violinist
- Edmund Barton (1920), Australia's first Prime Minister
- William Baylebridge, poet and philosopher
- John Burcham Clamp (1931)
- Sir Joseph Carruthers (1932), Premier of NSW
- Frank Clune (1971), writer
- Sir Roden Cutler (2002), Governor of NSW
- Sir Walter Davidson (1923), Governor of NSW
- Robin Dods (1920),
- Neville Gruzman (2005)
- Sir Archibald Howie (1943), Lord Mayor of Sydney
- John Horbury Hunt (1904), government architect
- Howard Joseland (1930),
- George Washington Lambert (1930), artist
- George Lauri (1909), comic actor
- Mortimer Lewis (1879), colonial architect
- Sir William Lyne (1913), Premier of NSW
- Sir Emmet McDermott (2002), Lord Mayor of Sydney
- Gladys Moncrieff (1976), entertainer
- Jack Moses (1945), writer
- Roy Redgrave (1922), actor
- Edmund Resch junior (1963), brewer
- Sir Richard Richards (1920), Lord Mayor of Sydney
- Sir John Robertson (1891), Premier of NSW
- Sir Allen Taylor (1940), Lord Mayor of Sydney
- "Red Ted" Theodore (1950), Queensland Premier and Federal Treasurer
- Sir Charles Wade (1922), Premier of NSW
- Sir Samuel Walder (1946), Lord Mayor of Sydney
- John Charles Wright (1933), Anglican Archbishop of Sydney
- members of the Fairfax, Norton, and Packer families
- members of the Foy family (including a monument to the disappeared Foy heiress, Juanita Nielsen)
- members of the Street family, including Sir Philip Whistler Street (1938) and Sir Kenneth Whistler Street (1972), both served as Chief Justice of NSW

In various parts of South Head General Cemetery there are Commonwealth war graves of 18 Australian service personnel, five of World War I and 13 of World War II. Other memorials note war veterans who are not buried within the cemetery. The cemetery is also the site of burials of a number of Sydney's early French families, including the Desjardins, Moutons and Tesserts.

== Description ==
Cemetery site from 1845, sited above Diamond Bay overlooking the Tasman Sea to its east. Current area 1.6 hectares (4 acres) containing around 6,000 burials. It is surrounded by a low stone fence, with impressive bronze cast-iron gates, between hefty sandstone piers entry gates. It contains some imposing monuments including family vaults. The cemetery has grass between the plots and lawn graves in the original paths. There are hardly any shrubs or trees within its walls, though groups and rows of Canary Island palms, (Phoenix canariensis, c. 1925) and later Norfolk Island pines (Araucaria heterophylla) and New Zealand pohutukawa trees (Metrosideros excelsa), surround the boundary ('define its perimeter'. A modest amenities building dates from c. 1950. South Head Cemetery has always been a general cemetery and does not have sections reserved for particular religious denominations.

Size is 1.6 hectares (4.0 acres). Ocean views, although the cemetery does not extend down to the cliff. As well as the main gates, there is a lych gate entrance on Burge Street and an arched entrance from Old South Head Road. From the main gates, a sweeping avenue leads down to the ornately carved Celtic cross, erected by the people of Sydney, to commemorate the grave of Sir Walter Edward Davidsion (died 1923), Governor of NSW, 1918–23. Large and expensive family monuments line this avenue, one of the best places to be buried in this cemetery. The cemetery is notable for some fine examples of art deco memorials dating from the 1920s and 1930s – including the Wheeler Memorial by sculptor Rayner Hoff – and for a preponderance of large granite memorials marking family plots. One of the most famous monuments is the marble bust to motor car racer, Phil Garlick (d. 1927), complete with steering wheel and racing cap flaps. Towards the southern part of the cemetery are some early sandstone altar tombs, dating from the 1850s, that were transferred from the Devonshire Street Cemeteries.

South Head Cemetery also features a number of naval burials, often marked with anchors – commanders and captains who now enjoy ocean views. An example is a marble cross and anchor marking the burial of sea captain Malcolm Green (d. 1904) (that includes a memorial to his brother James Green (d. 1857), captain of the ill-fated Dunbar). A few mausolea and family vaults are dotted throughout the site. A fabulous pair of Grecian and Gothic mausoleums memorialise the Foy and Smith families on the southern part of the site. The family plot includes a simple Celtic cross memorial to (Kings Cross) activist Juanita Nielsen (née Smith) who disappeared in 1975. South Head cemetery also boasts local wildlife, with kestrel sometimes perching on headstones.

=== Condition ===
As of 12 December 2016, the cemetery is one of the best-preserved and intact old cemeteries in Sydney. Headstones in a good state of preservation. The monuments are generally in very good condition. The South Head Cemetery is still in use, managed by Waverley Council, and this means that some of the landscape design has been compromised. Lawn burials cluster in every spare avenue and pathway.

=== Modifications and dates ===
1924 wall and gates, 1950s amenities block.

=== Further information ===
The cemetery is surrounded on three sides by 1- to 2-storey houses. On the west, a retirement apartment complex has been constructed on the site formerly occupied by Vaucluse High School.

== Heritage listing ==
As of 14 March 2017, South Head General Cemetery is of state heritage significance as the first general public cemetery in the eastern suburbs. It is on land originally granted in 1845 and eventually founded in 1868 as part of the attempt to cope with the growing demand for new burial grounds following the closure of Devonshire Street Cemetery in Surry Hills.

The state heritage significance of South Head General Cemetery is enhanced through its association with a number of high-achieving, famous and notable people from across NSW, Australia and the world including people from the fields of architecture, business and others of religious, political and sporting backgrounds. It contains the graves of people drowned in the 1927 sinking of the "Greycliffe" in Sydney Harbour and others associated with important events in the history and development of NSW.

South Head General Cemetery is of state heritage significance for its aesthetic values. It has landmark values availed by its position overlooking Diamond Bay and the Tasman Sea. Its eclectic collection of intact funerary monuments of various eras contributes to its landmark and aesthetic values.

South Head General Cemetery is of state heritage significance for its educational and research potential. The cemetery is an outdoor archive of genealogical, biographical, historical, architectural, artistic and demographic information which demonstrates the historic and contemporary social character of Sydney and New South Wales.

South Head General Cemetery is of state heritage significance as a rare and distinctive landscape character which sets it apart from other general cemeteries of its age and size. The absence of denominational or religious sections within the cemetery is rare.

South Head General Cemetery is of state heritage significance as a representative example of a burial ground that can demonstrate the principal characteristics of a general public cemetery from the Victorian period in NSW including funerary monuments which have evolved over time and reflect the social values and attitudes of the Australian community towards death and commemoration from the late 19th century to the present day.

South Head General Cemetery was listed on the New South Wales State Heritage Register on 25 August 2017 having satisfied the following criteria.

The place is important in demonstrating the course, or pattern, of cultural or natural history in New South Wales.

South Head General Cemetery is of state historical significance as the first general public cemetery in the eastern suburbs. On land originally granted in 1845 " for the purpose of a general cemetery for the interment of the dead, without an restrictions as to the religious persuasion of the deceased", South Head General Cemetery was eventually founded in 1868 as part of the attempt to cope with the growing demand for new burial grounds following the closure of Devonshire Street Cemetery in Surry Hills. Other cemeteries founded at the same time were Rookwood, Gore Hill and Balmain (now Pioneer Memorial Park, Leichhardt).

South Head General Cemetery may have particular historical significance for the decision to exclude religious sections or portions unlike most other general cemeteries.

The cemetery is of historical significance at a state level for its ability to demonstrate the historical rise of the Eastern suburbs as one of Sydney's most affluent and desirable locations to both live and die. The expansion of the cemetery from one acre when the land grant was made to the present four acres reflects the residential growth of Vaucluse and Watson Bay, and later the development Bellevue Hill, Double Bay and Point Piper. The construction of the substantial homes in these suburbs demonstrates the area's popularity with Sydney's political, cultural and business leaders since the nineteen century as does the burial of many of these individuals in South Head Cemetery.

The cemetery is still in use and demonstrates the cultural diversity and changing social values and attitudes of the Australian people towards death and its commemoration over nearly 150 years.

The place has a strong or special association with a person, or group of persons, of importance of cultural or natural history of New South Wales's history.

South Head General Cemetery is of state heritage significance for its historical association with a number of high-achieving, famous and notable people from across NSW, Australia and the world. Over nearly 150 years South Head Cemetery has become the final resting place for over 6,000 people, including 137 listed in the Australian Dictionary of Biography. These include notable people from architecture, business, religious, political and sporting backgrounds, such as: Australia's first Prime Minister, Edmund Barton (1920); NSW Governors Sir Walter Davidson (1923) and Sir Roden Cutler (2002); NSW Premiers Sir John Robertson (1891), Sir William Lyne (1913), Sir Charles Wade (1922) and Sir Joseph Carruthers (1932); Queensland Premier and Federal Treasurer "Red Ted" Theodore (1950); Sydney Lord Mayors Sir Richard Richards (1920), Sir Allen Taylor (1940), Sir Archibald Howie (1943), Sir Samuel Walder (1946), and Sir Emmet McDermott (2002); members of the Packer, Fairfax and Norton newspaper dynasties; members of the Street family legal dynasty including two Chief Justices, Sir Philip Whistler Street (1938) and Sir Kenneth Whistler Street (1972); Anglican Archbishop of Sydney John Charles Wright (1933); the Foy retailing family (including a monument to the disappeared Foy heiress Juanita Nielsen); architects Mortimer Lewis (1879), John Horbury Hunt (1904), Robin Dods (1920), Howard Joseland (1930), John Burcham Clamp (1931) and Neville Gruzman (2005); artist George Washington Lambert (1930); writers Jack Moses (1945) and Frank Clune (1971); entertainer Gladys Moncrieff (1976) and founder of the acting dynasty Roy Redgrave (1922); racing car driver "Phil" Garlick (1927); and Edmund Resch junior of the brewing family (1963).

South Head Cemetery has historical association significance at a state level as the final resting place for a number of individuals associated with significant NSW events, including being the location of 18 Commonwealth war graves for Australian service personnel – 5 of World War I and 13 of World War II. In addition, it contains the graves of 24 of the 40 people drowned in the 1927 sinking of the Greycliffe in Sydney Harbour. The burial of the Maori man known as John Blanket (Sir John Robertson's long-term servant) is an important and unusual indigenous interment in a European setting.

The place is important in demonstrating aesthetic characteristics and/or a high degree of creative or technical achievement in New South Wales.

South Head General Cemetery is of state heritage significance for its aesthetic values. Sited in a suburban setting on approx. four hectares, overlooking Diamond Bay and the Tasman Sea. The Cemetery is enclosed by a low stone wall and impressive bronze entry gates which contribute strongly to the cemetery's aesthetic values. The original form of the cemetery if visible with grass between the plots and lawn graves in the original paths. There are hardly any shrubs or trees within its walls, though groups and rows of Canary Island palms (c. 1925), and later Norfolk Island pines and New Zealand pohutukawa trees (Metrosideros excelsa), surround the boundary on the road verge.

The cemetery contains a collection of highly intact funerary monuments and grave furniture with a predominance of granite and trachyte, along with some sandstone and marble. There are a few statues of religious figures such as angels, but the more predominant designs are Celtic and other crosses and obelisks. Smaller monuments such as stone desks often include carved decorations using art deco style.

Significant monuments of high aesthetic significance include the monuments to Governor Walter Davidson and Archbishop John Wright, the tomb of Sir John Robertson designed by noted architect John Horbury Hunt, Hunt's own grave of brick, the cenotaph-style monument to Sydney Lord Mayor Archbald Howie (1943), the Foy family gravestone with the family members' signatures reproduced, the finely sculpted bas-relief of an angel and four cherubs on the grave of Fanny Eleanor Elizabeth Wheeler (1932) and the white marble sculpture of motor racing driver "Phil" Garlick who was killed in an accident at Maroubra Speedway (1927).

The place has strong or special association with a particular community or cultural group in New South Wales for social, cultural or spiritual reasons.

As an operational general public cemetery, South Head Cemetery is of state heritage significance for its historic and contemporary association with the social fabric of Sydney's eastern suburbs, particularly its cultural, political and business elite.

The cemetery reflects the cultural and religious diversity of the Australian community since 1870 and its contemporary social significance is increased by its public accessibility and regular visitation.

South Head General Cemetery has strong association with many prominent individuals and families that are interred in the cemetery, including the presence of a large number of the "Greycliffe" victims and a number of Sydney's early French families, including the Desjardins, Moutons and Tesserts.

The place has potential to yield information that will contribute to an understanding of the cultural or natural history of New South Wales.

South Head General Cemetery is an important reference site. The cemetery contains an outdoor archive of genealogical, biographical, historical, architectural, artistic and demographic information, and as such, South Head Cemetery is a significant resource asset for NSW.

It is a readily accessible resource by virtue of its location near the tourist centre of Watsons Bay and its proximity to public transport from the city centre.

The place possesses uncommon, rare or endangered aspects of the cultural or natural history of New South Wales.

Cemeteries of the same historical period are generally similar in layout, style and purpose but South Head General Cemetery meets this criterion of State heritage significance because it has an uncommon and distinctive landscape character which sets it apart from other cemeteries of similar age and size. The quality of the monuments and the cemetery layout are more closely aligned with larger general cemeteries such as Waverley, Rookwood and Gore Hill. In addition the absence of denominational or religious sections within the cemetery is rare.

The siting overlooking the Tasman Sea makes the cemetery both a passive recreational facility as well as a place of remembrance. A journalist writing in The Watchman newspaper in 1925 asserted: 'Everybody likes it. It is the most cheerful "God's Acre" I ever saw, and I have seen some of the best.'

The place is important in demonstrating the principal characteristics of a class of cultural or natural places/environments in New South Wales.

South Head General Cemetery is of state heritage significance as a representative example of a burial ground that can demonstrate the principal characteristics of a general public cemetery from the Victorian period in NSW.

The funerary monuments reflect the social values and attitudes of the Australian community towards death and commemoration from the late 19th century to the present day, with strong representation of the inter-War years.

The ongoing operation of the cemetery and the gradual introduction of different styles of monument (such as lawn graves) demonstrate the changing attitudes of the community towards funerary practices in NSW over time.

== See also ==
- Waverley Cemetery, at Bronte
