= Wentworth Memorial Church =

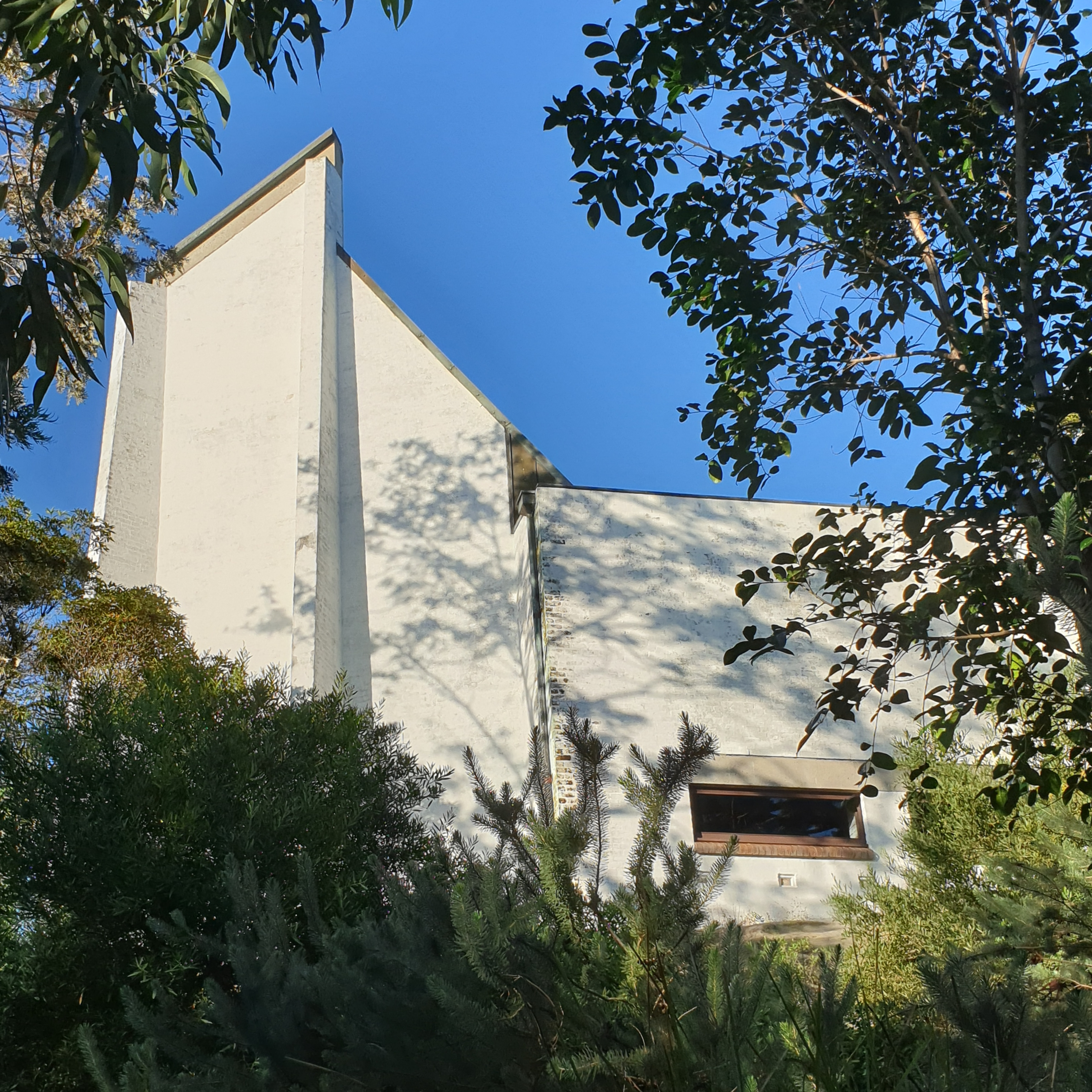
- Wentworth Memorial Church
- 33°51′05″S 151°16′31″E
- Location: 32B Fitzwilliam Road, Vaucluse, New South Wales
- Country: Australia
- Previous denomination: Anglican

History
- Status: Former church
- Founded: 27 February 1965
- Founder(s): Most Reverend Hugh Roland Gough, Archbishop of Sydney and Primate
- Dedication: To the servicemen and women who served during World War II
- Dedicated: 19 September 1965
- Consecrated: 2 July 1972

Architecture
- Functional status: Abandoned
- Architect(s): Clarke Gazzard and Partners
- Style: Chapel
- Construction cost: A£35,000
- Closed: 2006

Administration
- Diocese: Sydney
- Parish: St Peter's Parish, Watsons Bay

New South Wales Heritage Register
- Official name: Wentworth Memorial Church and Moveable Collection
- Type: State heritage (built)
- Designated: 25 September 2012
- Reference no.: 1882
- Type: Chapel
- Category: Religion
- Builders: Monteith Constructions; Miller Milston and Ferris (engineer)

Wentworth Memorial Church is a heritage-listed former Anglican church building located at 32B Fitzwilliam Road, Vaucluse, Sydney, Australia. It was designed by Clarke Gazzard and Partners and built by Monteith Constructions, with Miller Milston and Ferris as engineers. The property is privately owned; and was formerly owned by the Anglican Diocese of Sydney. It was added to the New South Wales State Heritage Register on 25 September 2012.

== History ==
The construction of a Church of England on this site was the intention of the immediate family of William Charles Wentworth (c. 1790–1872), whose trustees gave the land to the Church of England Diocese of Sydney Property Trust for that purpose in 1927. The parcel of land was shaped by suburban subdivision from 1904 and 1907. It was part of the Vaucluse Estate purchased by W. C. Wentworth in 1827, and as early as 1831 was planned to be eventually consecrated for the Wentworth Family Vault. The large boulder then visible from the verandah of Vaucluse House was the picturesque site designated by Wentworth himself. The Mausoleum and Vault were built for the interment of the remains of W. C. Wentworth on 6 May 1873, also the day of the consecration.

At the transfer of land to the Property Trust it was a condition that a church, hall and rectory were to be erected by 1937. The Church Hall was built in 1933, the foundation stone laid by the Governor of New South Wales, Sir Philip Game, on 7 April, and was used for church services. The congregation was a branch of St Peter's Watsons Bay, but was called Wentworth Memorial.

=== Church establishment and design ===
Under the incumbency of Rev. Neville Cyril Bathgate the architect Donald Gazzard (b. 1929) of Clarke Gazzard and Partners was commissioned to design the new church to house a congregation of 350 (this being the minimum diocesan standard size of the time). Don Gazzard was the design architect for this project. Gazzard trained as an Engineer and architect in England and upon returning to Australia worked for a number of years with Harry Seidler. In the early 1960s he became part of the firm Clarke, Gazzard and Partners and was a leading member of the Paddington Society and contributed to the conservation of the suburb in the 1970s. He became well known in the area of architecture and town planning and worked on the Trans Australia Airlines Terminal at Sydney Airport, the Mona Vale community centre and Goodwin Village at Edgecliff and his own home in Woollahra. The Wentworth Memorial Church was critically acclaimed in many publications when it was completed and was included in Neville Quarry's 1990 publication "World Architecture 1900–2000: a critical mosaic." Through all his architectural and planning works Gazzard was widely recognised as an important Australian architect.

The foundation stone to the Church is inscribed "To the glory of God, this stone was set by the Most Reverend Hugh Roland Gough MA, DD, Anglican Archbishop of Sydney and Primate on 27 February 1965, Churchwardens C. J. Sisley, G. H. Green, P. W. Grieve, Rector the Reverend N. C. Bathgate."

The building its forecourt and stepped approach were constructed by the builder Montieth Constructions at a reported cost of A£35,000. Designed for it at the same time were its furniture and liturgical furniture, fittings and plate; a wall hanging, organ case, and memorial plaques. Many of these were gifted to the church by families associated with the parish, the Rector and the Wentworth family. At the same time as they gave the sanctuary furniture the Wentworth family commissioned Donald Gazzard to repair the mausoleum. Donald Gazzard added the copper hood above the door to the mausoleum and is thought to have designed the path that connects it to the Church and Fitzwilliam Street, however, this is yet to be confirmed.

The church was built as a memorial to the servicemen and women who served during the World War II. A copper plaque in the floor with black lettering proclaims "We remember with pride and gratitude those who in the 1939–1945 War put service to their country before life itself." It was dedicated for use by the Archbishop of Sydney on 19 September 1965, and consecrated on 2 July 1972, once it was free of debt.

The Wentworth Memorial Church was widely published at the time of its completion and is included in architectural histories of Australian Architecture as one of the most significant non domestic works of the Sydney School.

Don Gazard described the Wentworth Memorial Church at Vaucluse as "my most important building from the Sixties."

"During my six years working overseas I had become increasingly interested in the unerring way vernacular buildings respond so directly to local climate and materials, and much was made at the time of the whitewashed "Greek Island" look of this church. I had also seen the radical Le Corbusier Church at Ronchamp, and although neither of these was a conscious influence they must have played some part, like all the other things I had seen; I prefer to leave the influences game to others.

"...[the] Church committee wanted to demolish the hall" [fronting Fitzwilliam Road and build the church there, but I persuaded them to] "build on the great acropolis like rock outcrop in the middle of the site instead. You can imagine the arguments about how difficult it would be for weddings and funerals. But the idea of leaving your car and walking up past those great sandstone rocks, seeing and not seeing the church, to progress across a forecourt with the axis shifting as one enters the church and, then to find natural light flooding down over the sanctuary from a concealed skylight was more attractive.

"The construction is very simple with white painted brickwork, timber floors and ceiling, and specially designed pews from Tasmanian Blackwood. The brief for the church was simple: a church of contemporary design to seat 350 people, which conformed to the liturgy and form of worship of the Church of England. The size was optimistic of course; the hoped for religious revival has still to happen and although the church is full at Christmas and Easter the congregation normally numbers less than a hundred people. I was concerned to incorporate the ideas of the New Liturgical Movement (then current in the design of post-war European churches) and bring the congregation close to the sanctuary in a way that would increase the feeling of direct participation and lessen the feeling of remoteness felt in older churches. These ideas influenced the shape of the church in both the broad width of the nave and the desire for a high level of daylight."

— Don Gazzard in Sydneysider: An Optimistic Life in Architecture.

The land containing the adjacent Wentworth Mausoleum is now leased to and maintained by the Historic Houses Trust of New South Wales and presented as part of Vaucluse House Estate. The Woollahra Municipal Council nominated the church site for potential NSW State Heritage Register listing, after Council rejected plans by the Anglican Church to subdivide the church and its hall. The Land and Environment Court of New South Wales approved this subdivision in 2010. A previous nomination for NSW State Heritage Register listing was not acted upon by then Minister for Heritage, Frank Sartor MP in 2008.

=== Sale by the Anglican Church ===
Last used for communion in 2006, the Anglican Church sold the buildings and 2,000-square-metre (22,000 sq ft) grounds in mid-2017 for A$5.6 million to a funeral operator. In November 2017 it was reported that the former church was again listed for sale.

The church building was again put up for sale in September 2021.

== Description ==
The Wentworth Memorial Church with its soaring white walls and walled courtyard caps the top of a rocky hill on part of the former Wentworth Estate at Vaucluse in Sydney's eastern suburbs. The site of the citadel like church is bounded by Fitzwilliam and Chapel Roads. Below the church to the south (Chapel Road) is located the c. 1873 Wentworth Mausoleum, to its north (Fitzwilliam Road) the c. 1933 former Church Hall.

The c. 1965 church designed by Donald Gazzard is an acknowledged and significant example of the regional architecture that evolved in New South Wales in the 1960s and is known as the Sydney School.

The once highly visible church building is now largely obscured by Indigenous and exotic vegetation. The church is approached by a broad track that sweeps up from Fitzwilliam Road around the base of the massive sandstone boulders upon which the church sits. The design of the church accommodated the retention of the outcrop and associated Port Jackson Figs. The path narrows near the top forming deep brick edged concrete steps and then finally brick steps up to a modern interpretation of a roofed lych gateway to the white walled forecourt of the church. Jennifer Tayler equates the journey to the church as one of "revelation" with the turning path providing "various viewpoints of the building", however most of these views have been reduced to mere glimpses due to encroaching vegetation.

Taylor describes the church as combining in "a quite magical manner" the "clear forms and high natural lighting" characteristic of the Sydney School with "a Greek sense of the three dimensional form and sequential progression."

The church is characterised by brick walls in a stretcher bond which are rendered externally (white) and painted internally (white). The roof has an unconventional shape, sloping steeply from a clerestory above the altar towards the rear of the church where the entrance is located. Externally the roof is formed of copper sheeting and internally of timber panelling. The entrance verandah is both physically and visually an extension of the main roof form, the lowest point of which comes to rest on a white angled column. Here the roof ends with an elegant copper storm water feature like a cubist gargoyle delivering roof water to a circular drain edged by brick pavers and filled with large smooth river stones.

External Inspection reveals: painted timber framed windows to clerestory, painted timber framed entrance doors and windows. Small casement windows to northern and southern sides, continuous concrete lintels (left natural). A small brick belltower triangular in shape, is an extension to front wall. A cross fabricated in mild steel stands above the bell tower. A marble plaque at the base of the bell tower commemorates the laying of the foundation stone in 1965 by the Archbishop of Sydney. There is a brick paved terrace to the front, with four brick steps leading to the entrance of the Church.

Internal inspection reveals: brick piers to internal white painted brick walls; continuous concrete lintels (left natural); high timber panelled ceilings; brick paving to entrance, timber floor boards, and brick paved altar. Reinforced concrete elements are cantilevered from the walls at the rear of the church and on the altar to form shelves for objects of service and bench style seating. The raw formed shelves are simple and modest, while the bench like seats are covered in a shaped natural timber the lip of which curves over the edge on the concrete. The materials are honest and obvious, with the juxtaposition of the formed concrete and shaped timber comparable to the concrete base of the church and the sandstone boulders upon which it sits.

=== Movable Heritage ===
- Shaped timber pews organic in form affixed with commemorative plaques contemporaneous with the church.
- An elegant altar table in natural timbers and a second comparable table contemporaneous with the church.
- A timber chair of more traditional design (provenance and date unknown)
- Metalware (silver Offertory Plate, silver Crucifix and silver support for the Bible) designed by Helge Larsen (b.1929) and Darani Lewers (b.1936).
- A large wall hanging behind and above the altar table by Mona Hessing (b.1933 – d.2001).

=== Condition ===
The Royal Australian Institute of Architects advise that the building is generally in good order although in need of general maintenance as is the brickwork in the courtyard and paintwork and surfaces of the building. The architect Donald Gazzard has been critical of alterations to the skylight. It was also noted that introduced species are flourishing in the grounds of the church which are also in need of maintenance and attention.

The church demonstrates a very high degree of integrity in respect of its fabric, fittings and movable heritage.

=== Modifications and dates ===
The building is in near original condition. The seat on the stepped ramp shown on Gazzard's drawing does not exist. The major skylight above the chancel appears to have been altered. Two new toilets on the southern side have been constructed.

== Heritage listing ==
The c. 1965 Wentworth Memorial Church which was built as a memorial to the fallen soldiers of World War II is of State significance as one of the most significant ecclesiastical examples of the Sydney School style of architecture, which came to prominence in the 1960s. The listing also includes a collection of moveable heritage including purpose-designed pews, furniture, artworks and metalware by significant Twentieth century artists such as Darani Lewers, Helge Larsen and Mona Hessing. These items contribute to the State heritage significance of the Church.

The Wentworth Memorial Church is widely considered to be the finest surviving work in the Sydney School style of the important mid to late Twentieth Century Architect Donald Gazzard (b.1929). Gazzard was the inaugural winner of the Wilkinson Prize for domestic architecture in 1961 and widely regarded as of prominence in the field of architecture.

The church is of State significance for its association with Vaucluse Estate of noted colonial explorer, poet journalist and politician William Wentworth and his family who developed the estate from 1827. The rocky outcrop where the church is now located was a favourite spot for William Wentworth to view his estate and was also where he chose to be buried as evidenced by the Wentworth mausoleum on the opposite side of this outcrop. The church represents a final phase in the historical development of the Vaucluse Estate, being the last built work associated with the family of William Charles Wentworth (c. 1790–1872) and the fulfilment of the Wentworth family's long held intention to consecrate the land and erect a church.

Wentworth Memorial Church was listed on the New South Wales State Heritage Register on 25 September 2012 having satisfied the following criteria.

The place is important in demonstrating the course, or pattern, of cultural or natural history in New South Wales.

The Wentworth Memorial Church which was built as a memorial to the servicemen and women who served during Second World War is of State significance for its association with Vaucluse Estate of colonial explorer journalist, poet and politician William Wentworth and the Wentworth family who developed the estate from 1827. The Wentworth Memorial Church represents a final phase in the historical development of the Vaucluse Estate, being the last built work associated with the family of William Charles Wentworth (c. 1790 – c. 1872) and the fulfilment of the Wentworth family's long held intention to consecrate the land and erect a church.

The place has a strong or special association with a person, or group of persons, of importance of cultural or natural history of New South Wales's history.

The Wentworth Memorial Church is of State significance for its historic association with the William Wentworth, explorer and founding father of the Nation and his influential Wentworth family and their legacy. Wentworth's remains and that of other members of the family are interred in the State heritage listed Wentworth Mausoleum located on the adjacent related site. The land associated with the Mausoleum, the church and the church hall were conditionally bequested to the Anglican church in 1927. Conditions included that the Church retain the mausoleum as consecrated land and not disturb the Wentworth family remains lying there in and that an Anglican church be established on the site in memory of William Wentworth.

The church is of State significance as one of the most significant ecclesiastical examples of the Sydney School style of architecture which came to prominence in the 1960s. It is widely considered to be the best surviving work of the important mid to late Twentieth Century Australian Architect Donald Gazzard (b.1929) of the practice Clarke and Gazzard.

Donald Gazzard who was one of the first employees of the eminent architect Harry Seidler from 1950 to 1954, commenced practice in New South Wales in 1960 and came to prominence for the design of a house at 12 Ellesmere Avenue, Hunters Hill, which was awarded the inaugural Wilkinson Prize for domestic Architecture in 1961.

Whilst Gazzard's body of work is small in comparison to other prominent architects of the period, his works were generally documented and disseminated for a public audience. The Wentworth Memorial Church was widely published at the time of its completion and is included in the major architectural histories of Australia to this day as an important example of the Sydney School style of regional architecture.

Gazzard was the editor of Architecture in Australia in the 1960s, and writer of the influential Australian Outrage.

The place is important in demonstrating aesthetic characteristics and/or a high degree of creative or technical achievement in New South Wales.

The Wentworth Memorial Church, designed by Donald Gazzard of Gazzard, Clarke and Partners in 1964 is of State significance as one of the most significant non domestic works of the "Sydney School", the regionally distinctive architecture that emerged in Sydney in the 1960s, and went onto to influence Australian architecture for the next two decades.

The Wentworth Memorial Church is considered the most architecturally distinguished church of the period in Sydney, with its visually dramatic siting, progressive design and completeness of execution. The Twentieth Century architectural historian and critic Jennifer Taylor describes the church as combining "in a quite magical manner" the "clear forms and high natural lighting" characteristic of the Sydney School with "a Greek sense of the three dimensional form and sequential progression." The setting and the sequential "reveal" procession towards the building is a significant aspect of the design and siting of the church.

The church which crowns a rocky hill top with its soaring white walls has State significant landmark qualities. The high visual prominence of the church has been somewhat obscured in recent years by vegetation.

The moveable collection of purpose-built furniture, metalware and artwork by significant Twentieth century artists and craftsmen is aesthetically distinctive and designed specifically for the Church. The collection contributes to the Churches statement as an exemplary ecclesiastical work of the Sydney regional style of the late 1960s.

The place has strong or special association with a particular community or cultural group in New South Wales for social, cultural or spiritual reasons.

As evidenced by its inclusion on the RAIA's Register of Twentieth Century Architecture and its inclusion as an exemplar of the work of the Sydney school and the Late Twentieth Century Ecclesiastical style, the place is held in high esteem by NSW architects and others interested in Australian architecture.

The place possesses uncommon, rare or endangered aspects of the cultural or natural history of New South Wales.

The Wentworth Memorial Church represents a rare use of the Sydney School style in an ecclesiastical building. More particularly it is thought to be the only ecclesiastical work in the Sydney School style using the idiom of roughly surfaced off white finishes over brick or concrete.

The place is important in demonstrating the principal characteristics of a class of cultural or natural places/environments in New South Wales.

The Wentworth Memorial Church is of State significance as part of a group which collectively illustrates the Sydney School style of architecture. The Twentieth Century architectural historian and critic Jennifer Taylor has noted that "the use of roughly surfaced, off-white finishes over brick or concrete was not alien to the Sydney School palette", having been used "as a foil to dark timbers in early houses by Allen, Jack and Cottier" and by the mid-1960s it had become a hallmark of Ken Woolley's low cost housing. Taylor considers the church to be one of the finest buildings in this idiom of the Sydney School. The Wentworth Memorial Church is outstanding because of its integrity and the esteem with which it is held by the architectural profession.

== See also ==
- Australian non-residential architectural styles
- List of Anglican churches in the Diocese of Sydney
- Bishopscourt, Darling Point
- Wentworth Mausoleum
