= Sarah Wentworth =

Plaintiff in Australia's first breach of promise suit and wife of William Wentworth

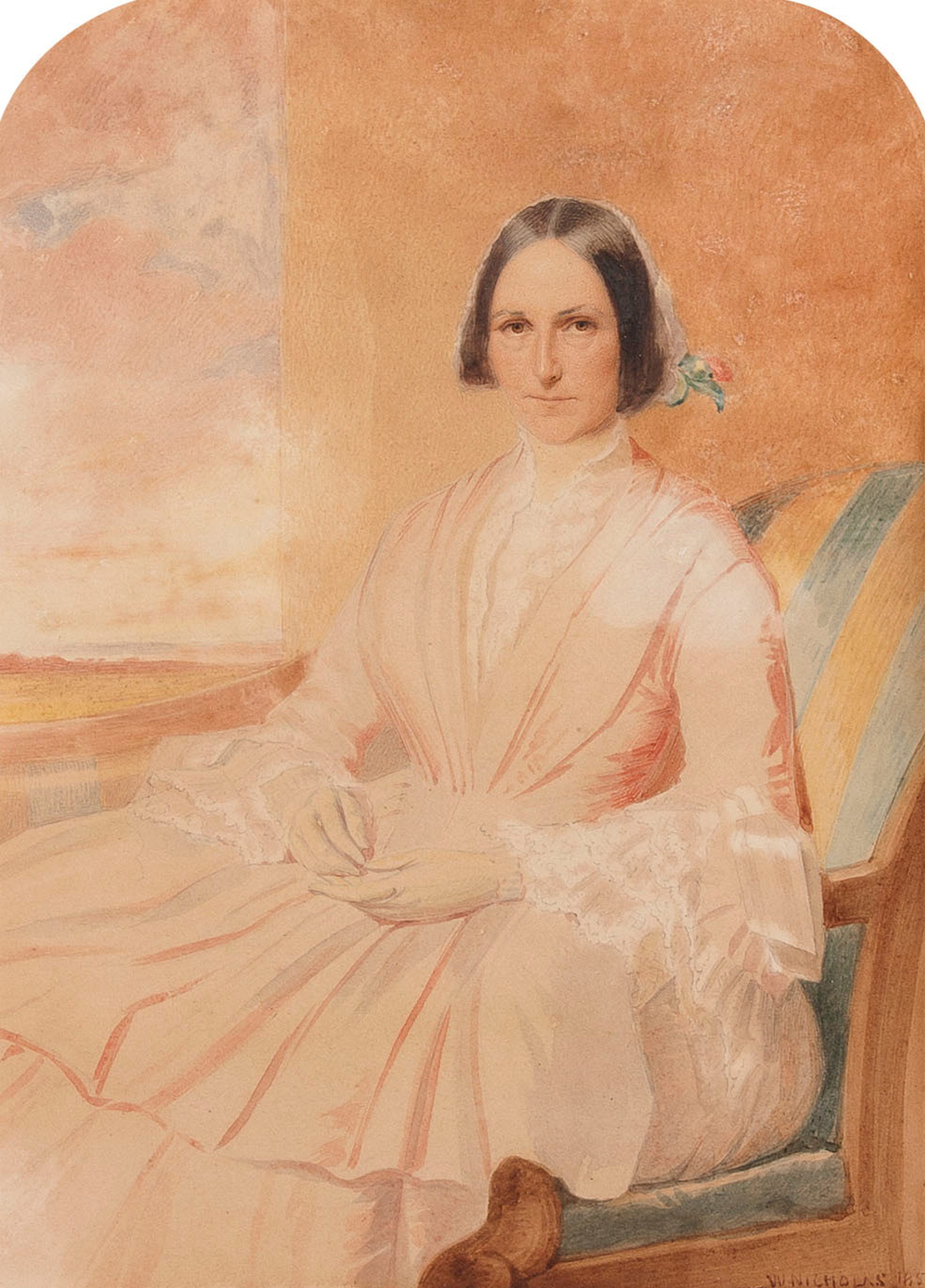
- Born: Sarah Cox; 1 January 1805; Sydney, Australia
- Died: 14 July 1880 (aged 74–75); Eastbourne, England
- Resting place: Ocklynge Cemetery, Eastbourne
- Spouse: William Charles Wentworth (m. 1829; died 1872)
- Children: 10

Sarah Wentworth (née Cox; 1 January 1805 – 14 July 1880) was an Australian proprietor and businesswoman who brought the first breach of promise suit in Australia. During the proceedings, she was represented by barrister and statesman William Wentworth, her future husband.

== Life ==
Sarah Cox's parents, blacksmith Francis Cox and Frances Morton, were ex-convicts who had completed their sentences by the time of her birth. They had not married, as Cox had a family in England. They lived on Sydney Cove.

By the time of Payne's marriage proposal, Sarah Cox was living at the home of a Mrs. Foster, a milliner for whom she worked as an apprentice. At some point later, she worked at a butcher's shop set up by partner William Wentworth.

=== Breach of promise suit ===
In 1825, Cox brought a breach of promise lawsuit against Captain John Payne, who had withdrawn his marriage proposal. Hers was the first breach of promise case to be tried in Australia. She was represented by Wentworth, newly a barrister. Payne, who vowed to Cox "that his eyes might drop out of his head if he did not fulfil his promise of marriage," cheated on her with a wealthier widow by the name of Mrs. Leverton, following which Cox sent him a volley of invective-filled letters. Payne was found guilty and ordered to pay £100 in damages.

=== Relationship with William Wentworth ===
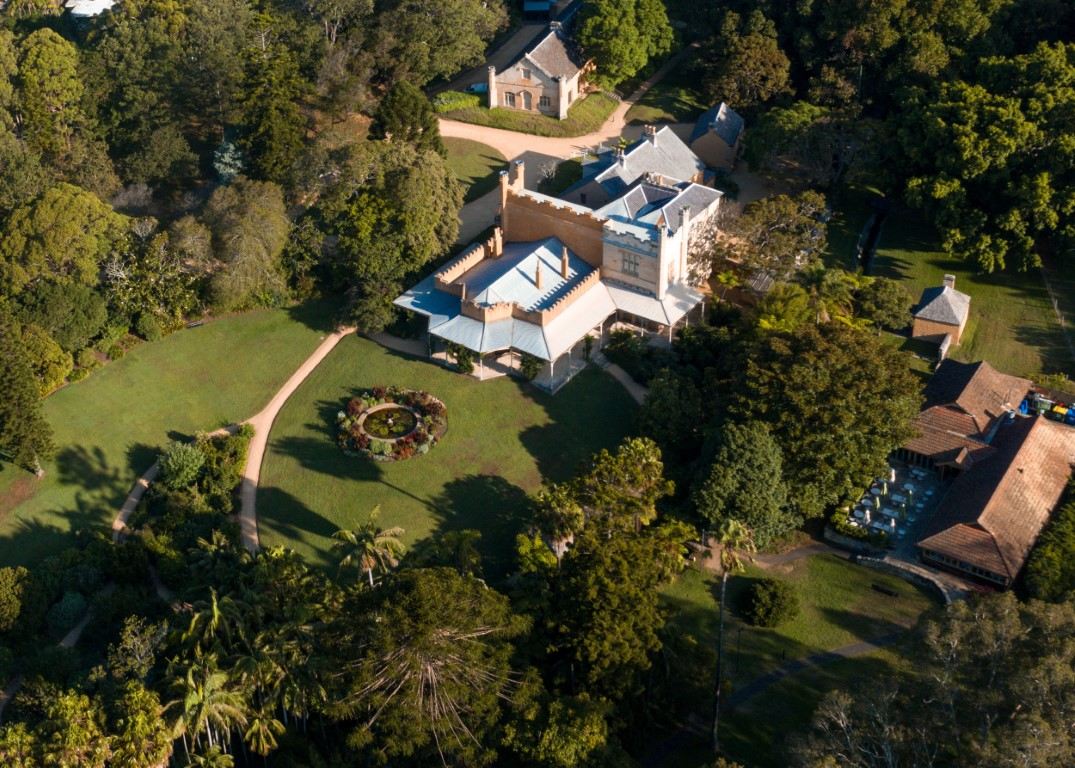
Vaucluse House, which Wentworth lived in and oversaw

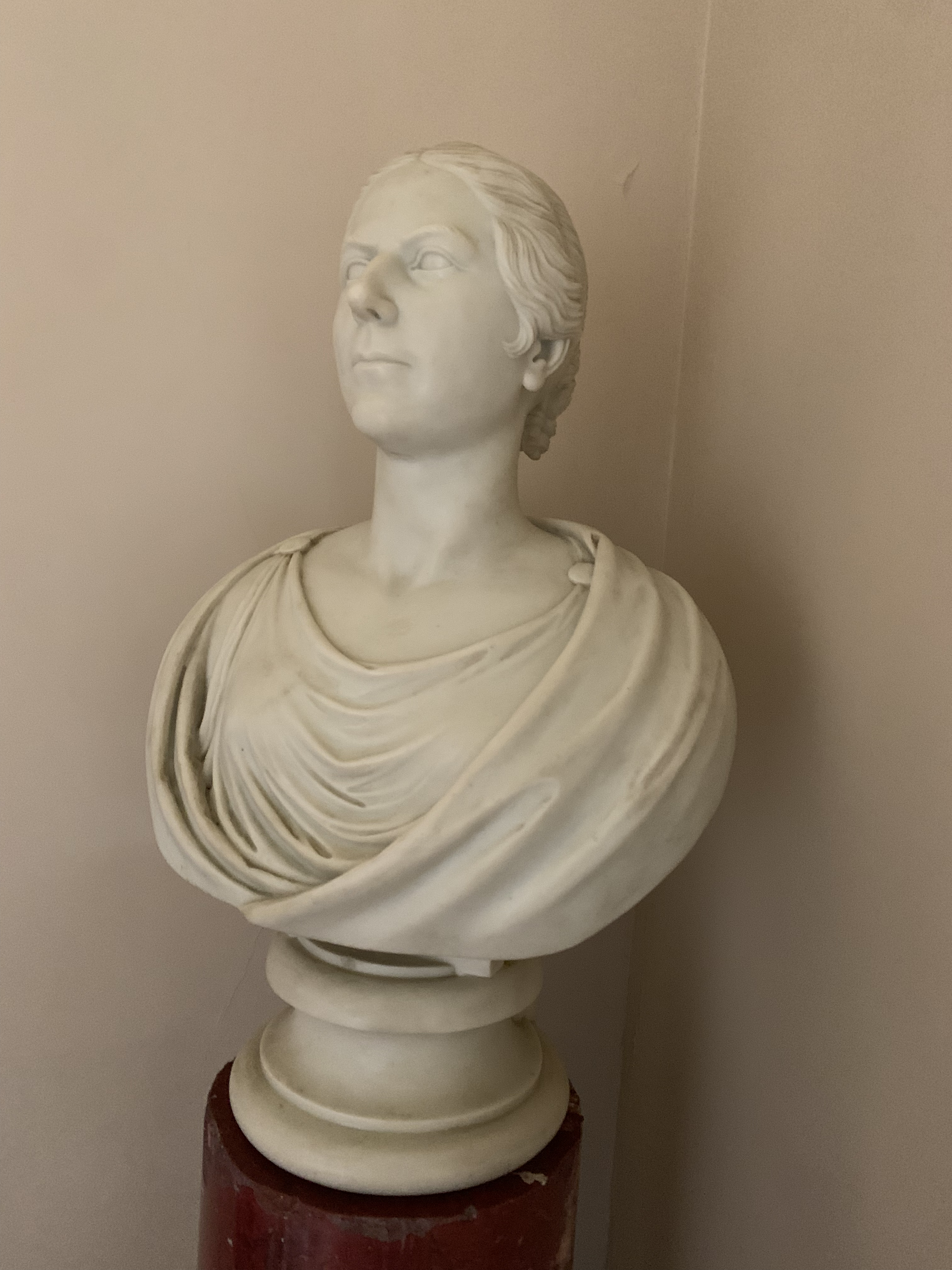
Bust of Sarah Wentworth in Vaucluse House

Cox and Wentworth became romantically involved whilst he was representing her. That year, Wentworth began leasing the 295-acre Petersham Estate and from mid 1825 the two lived there together. In 1825, Cox and Wentworth named their first daughter Thomasine in honour of Sir Thomas Brisbane, former Governor of New South Wales; Thomasine was born six months after her court case against Payne. The family moved into Vaucluse House a few years later, where Cox lived a comfortable but secluded life.

On 26 October 1829 at St Philip's Church, Sydney, Sarah married William. Three days prior to their marriage, a love poem to Sarah authored by William appeared in his paper, The Australian:

For I must love thee, love thee on,
'Till life's remotest latest minute;
And when the light of life is gone,—
Thou'll find its lamp—had thee within it.

William Wentworth would in 1830 father a child out of wedlock with Jamima Eagar, the estranged wife of Edward Eagar.

Carol Liston, biographer of Sarah Wentworth, noted that her commissioning of various domestic duties was fundamental to the success of her husband and children. As William grew old, she took on much of the administration of his business interests.^{:98-99}

=== Finances ===
Sarah Wentworth received a small income from the Sydney properties formerly owned by her father, who died in 1831.^{:98} William set up a trust fund for her which accrued funds from land sales or mortgages he entered into from 1845, payable should he die or go bankrupt. Sarah secured £24,416 before surrendering her right to a dower from future sales in February 1853, prior to departing for England; her signature was required to release the dower funds on each sale, and her husband was in the midst of settling financial affairs.^{:37-38}

=== Societal treatment ===
Wentworth was long ill-treated owing to her convict heritage and the circumstances of her involvement with William. Her invitation, alongside those of two other women, to the annual Queen's Birthday Ball in 1847 became the subject of controversy, and she was targeted by a vicious campaign opposing their invitation to Government House. The controversy flared over May and June, before the women indicated to Lady Mary FitzRoy, wife of the governor, that they would not attend functions at Government House and apologised for what had occurred.^{:47-52}

After moving from Sydney in 1853, Sarah Wentworth wrote of London that it was a “place where women are treated better than any other place … for they are loved and cared for here”.^{:62}

High society came to accept her. She became acquainted with Sir John Young and Lady Young, the former of whom was Lord High Commissioner of the Ionian Islands, on Corfu, whilst the Wentworths were in Europe. Upon returning to Sydney, she was regularly invited to Government House. She wrote that "all the nice families ... call on us." A ball was held for the Wentworth family at Roslyn Hall in modern-day Kings Cross in September 1862 featuring the Vice-Regal couple and other distinguished guests, by which point only Sarah Wentworth's son-in-law Thomas Fisher looked down upon the family.

=== Wentworth Mausoleum ===
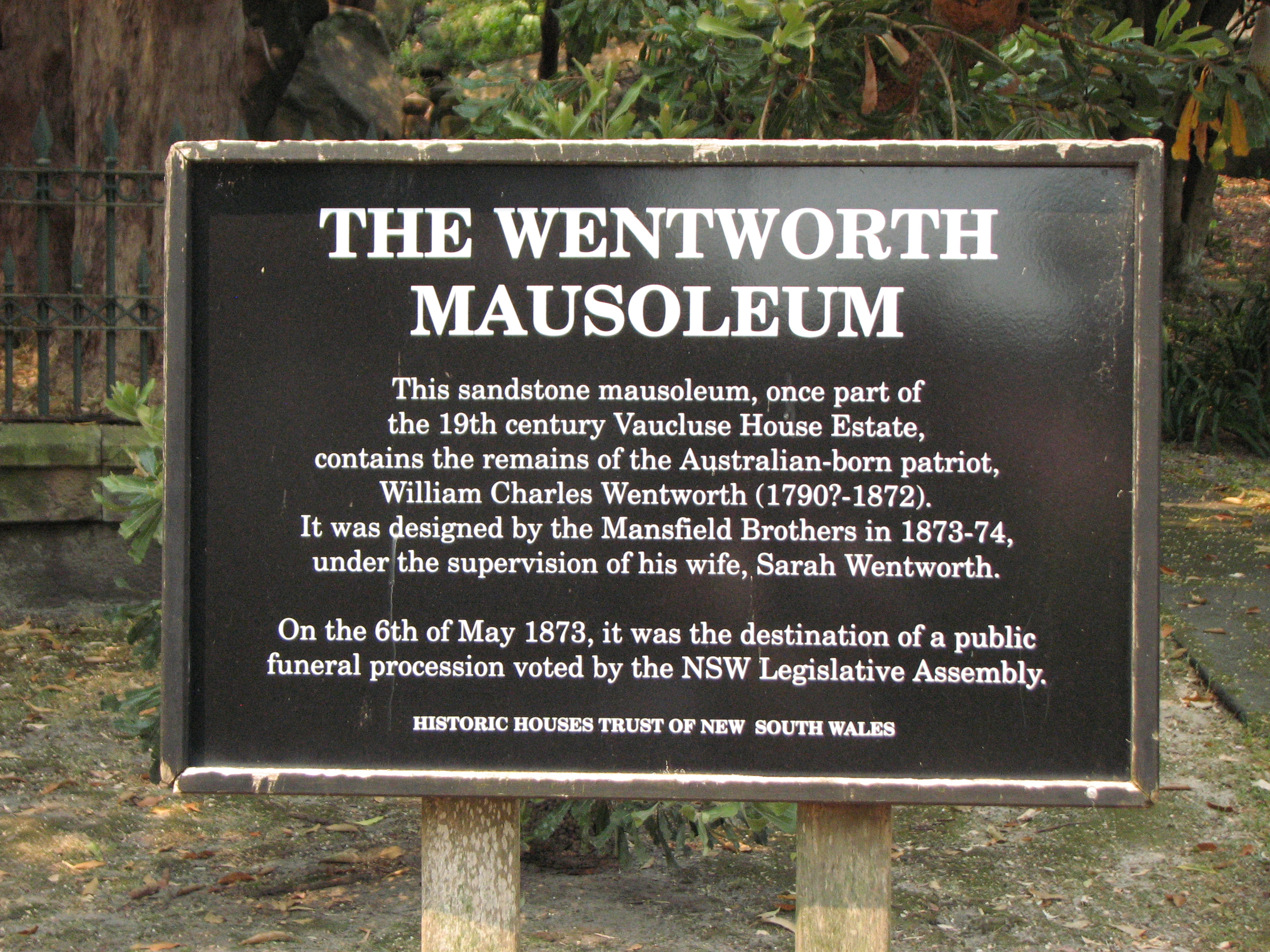
Sign at the Wentworth Mausoleum acknowledging Sarah Wentworth's role in supervising its design

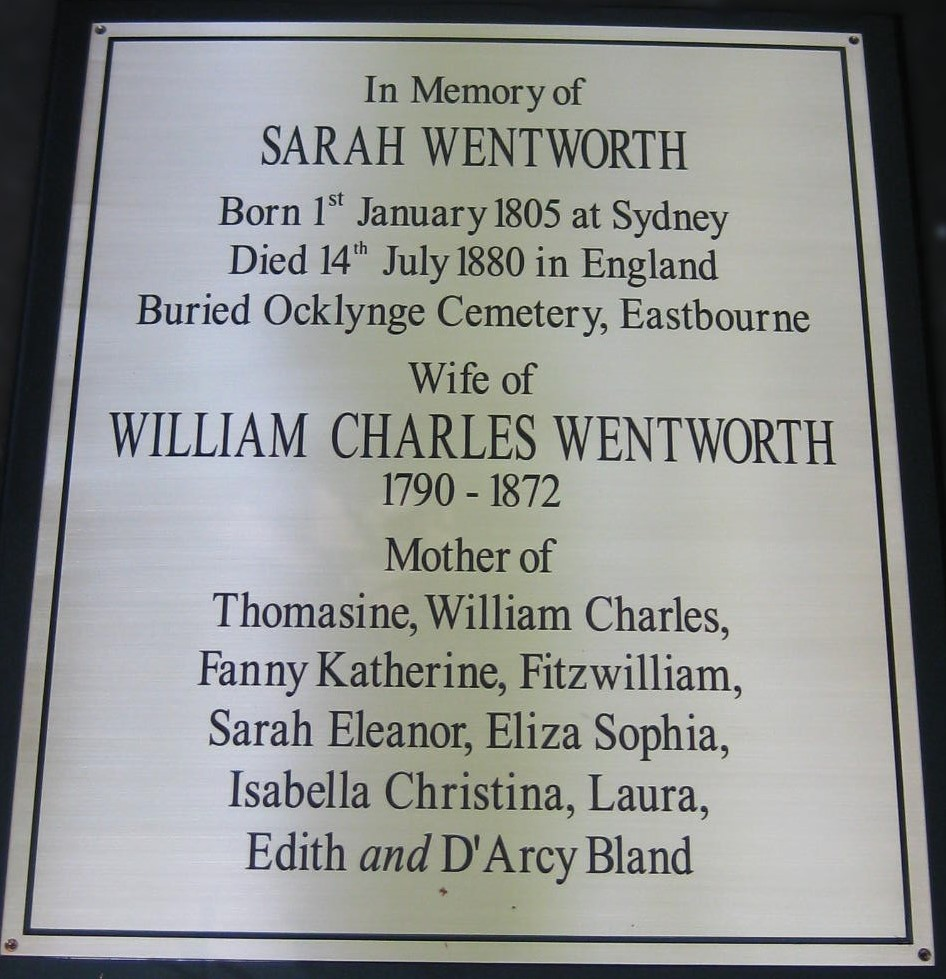
Brass plaque in Memory of Sarah Wentworth on the inside wall of the Wentworth Mausoleum

Sarah Wentworth was instrumental in the design of the heritage-listed Wentworth Mausoleum. The vault, according to newspaper descriptions, was constructed as Sarah had desired, and she commissioned the chapel built above it.

As early as 1831, following the death of Sarah's father, Francis Cox, William intended to have land consecrated and to build a family vault at Vaucluse. This did not eventuate in his lifetime but William had informed his family that he wished to be buried near a rocky outcrop on the hill above Parsley Bay. The site was visible from the front verandah of the house and overlooked both the harbour and the estate.

After William's death at the family's rented estate, Merley House, Wimborne, Dorset, England in March 1872, Sarah sent her son-in-law Thomas Fisher a sketch of the location and instructions that a vault was to be hewn out of a large single rock on the slope but "left in its natural state outside". Sarah informed Fisher that she would travel to Brussels to order marble for the vault and would also bring "some Iron gates and railing to enclose it". The vault was to be large – Eliza wrote: "it was Papa's wish to have my grandfather, my Uncle & Willie & Bell & poor Nellie & we should all like to be there when our time comes."

Sarah accepted the New South Wales Government's proposal to accord her husband the honours of a public funeral. The funeral service for William Wentworth was held at St Andrew's Cathedral, Sydney, on 6 May 1873. The only women admitted to the congregation of 2,000 were members of the Wentworth family.

Sarah commissioned the architects Mansfield Brothers to design a chapel to be constructed over the vault. The chapel's Gothic Revival design seemingly was intended to complement the Vaucluse estate's other Gothic style buildings. By November 1873 the chapel was still incomplete: "Men are working, but as Miss W said they are drunk and away oftener than at work". The stone and iron palisade fence was erected by early March 1874.

The brass plaque commemorating Sarah Eleanor may have been responsible for the long-held belief that her mother, Sarah, was buried in the mausoleum. Despite her desire for the family to "all rest together in our native place", Sarah was buried in July 1880 in Ocklynge Cemetery at Eastbourne, Sussex. On 15 December 2015, a brass plaque to the Memory of Sarah Wentworth was placed in the Mausoleum.

== Family ==
Andrew Tink, biographer of her husband, notes that Sarah Wentworth relied on "persuasion rather than force" in getting her children to act. The Wentworths had seven daughters and three sons:^{:24-25}

- Thomasine Wentworth (1825–1913)
- William Charles Wentworth (1827–1859)
- Fanny Katherine Wentworth (1829–1893), named after her parents’ mothers^{21-22}
- Fitzwilliam Wentworth (1833–1915) married Mary Jane Hill, daughter of George Hill
  - William Charles Wentworth III (1871–1949) married Florence Denise Griffiths, daughter of George Neville Griffiths
    - William Charles Wentworth IV (1907–2003) (known as Bill Wentworth, Liberal member of Parliament 1949–77, inaugural Minister in charge of Aboriginal Affairs under the Prime Minister)
    - Diana Wentworth Wentworth married Mungo Ballardie MacCallum (1913–99)
      - Mungo Wentworth MacCallum (1941–2020)
- Sarah Eleanor Wentworth (1835–1857)
- Eliza Sophia Wentworth (1838–1898)
- Isabella Christiana (Christina) Wentworth (1840–1856)
- Laura Wentworth (1842–1887) married Henry William Keays-Young in 1872.
- Edith Wentworth (1845–1891) married Rev. Sir Charles Gordon-Cumming-Dunbar, 9th Baronet in 1872.
- D'Arcy Bland Wentworth (1848–1922).

== Legacy ==
In a 2008 article for The Sydney Morning Herald referring to the 1825 lawsuit, academic Alecia Simmons described Sarah Cox (as she was then known) as "a fiercely independent 18-year-old". She was nineteen at the time.

A biography was written about Sarah Wentworth by Carol Listen in 1988. Contemplating the book, academic Grace Carroll writes:

Although William Charles Wentworth continues to be heralded as a significant figure in Australian history, Sarah's story has not been forgotten. Liston's 1988 biography, Sarah Wentworth: Mistress of Vaucluse, made a significant contribution to revealing Sarah's prominent position in her family and home, suggesting that she may well have been the strong and refined woman represented in Simonetti's bust. As a result, visitors to Vaucluse House today learn of the woman who played a vital role in establishing the House and the Wentworth family legacy. Her story brings to life the lot of a colonial woman whose experiences were both extraordinary, yet representative of that of many 'currency lasses.'

A brass plaque commemorating her was installed in the Wentworth Mausoleum in 2015.
