= Wentworth Mausoleum =

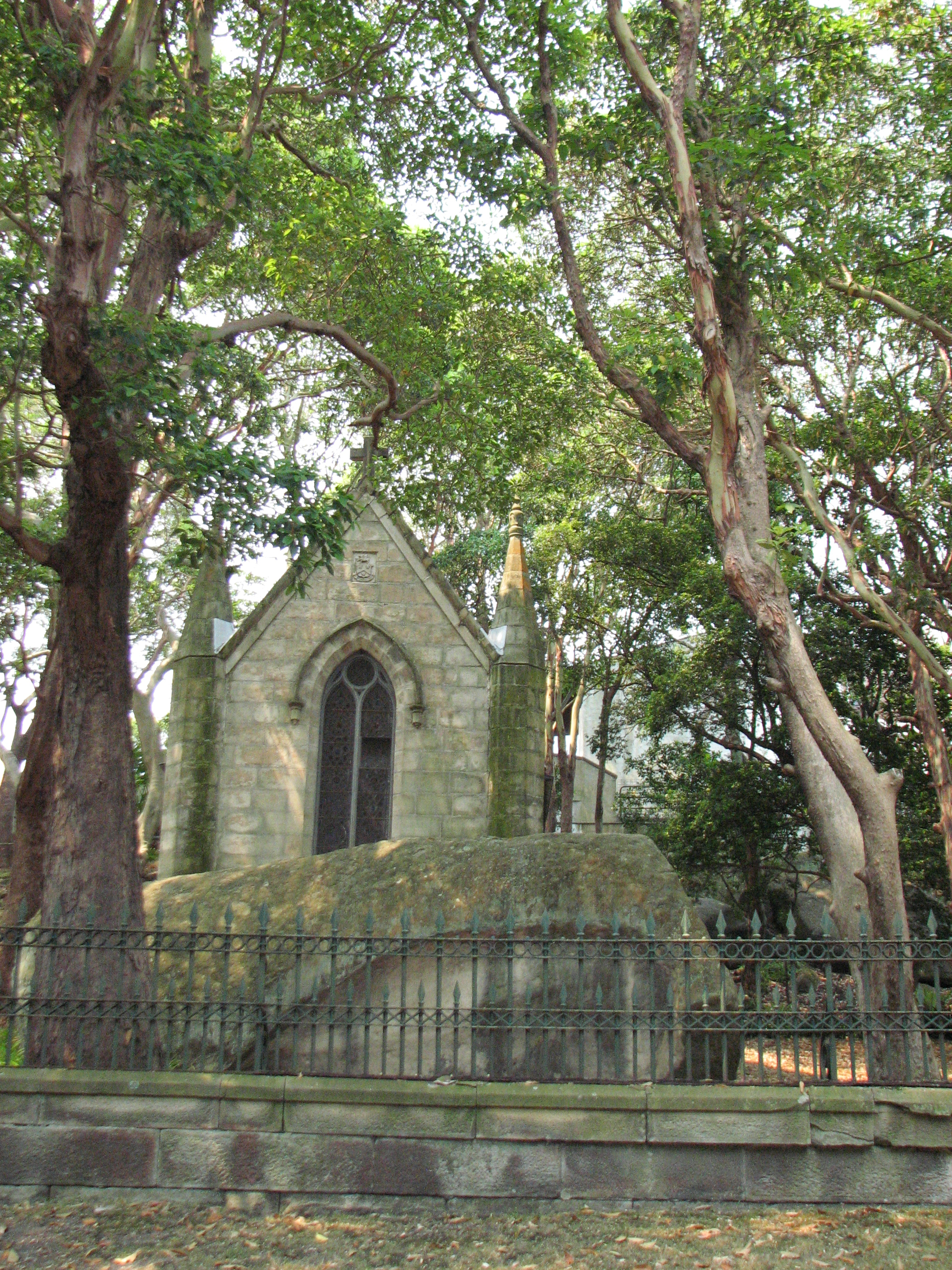
- Wentworth Mausoleum in 2019

- Location within Sydney Location within Australia
- 33°51′06″S 151°16′30″E
- Location: Chapel Road, Vaucluse, New South Wales, Australia

History
- Built: 1872–1874
- Built for: Wentworth family

Site notes
- Architect: Mansfield Brothers
- Architectural style: Gothic Revival
- Owner: Anglican Church Property Trust

New South Wales Heritage Register
- Official name: Wentworth Mausoleum and site
- Type: State heritage (complex / group)
- Designated: 2 April 1999
- Reference no.: 622
- Type: Mausoleum/Tomb/Funeral Vault/Ossario
- Category: Cemeteries and Burial Sites

Wentworth Mausoleum is a heritage-listed mausoleum located at 5 Chapel Road, Vaucluse, New South Wales, Australia. It was built from 1872 to 1874 by Mansfield Brothers, architects. It is also known as Wentworth Mausoleum and site. The property is owned by Anglican Church Property Trust and is managed by Sydney Living Museums as part of Vaucluse House. It was added to the New South Wales State Heritage Register on 2 April 1999.

Within the mausoleum is buried Australian statesman William Charles Wentworth and children Isabella, Sarah Eleanor and William Charles. Sarah Wentworth played a key role in its construction, commissioning the chapel in which the vault is situated.

== History ==
=== William Charles Wentworth ===
Vaucluse Estate comprised the 32-hectare (80-acre) original land grant to Thomas Laycock in 1793, 10 hectares (25 acres) granted to Robert Cardell in 1795, 16 hectares (40 acres) granted to Francis MacGlynn and 150 hectares (370 acres) granted to William Wentworth, which, with his purchase of 59 hectares (145 acres) in 1827, took the estate to a total size of 208 hectares (515 acres). Vaucluse House commenced as a small stone cottage built for the eccentric Irish knight, Sir Henry Browne Hayes, who had purchased two adjacent grants Laycock's 32 hectares (80 acres) and Cardell's 10 hectares (25 acres) in August 1803 (the house was actually sited on part of MacGlynn's holding). In April 1805 Hayes' friend and land agent, Samuel Breakwell, wrote that Sir Henry was "building an handsome Stone House, where he intends to reside entirely at the Close [of] this year." The remains of this cottage survive at the heart of Vaucluse House and determined its subsequent development. Hayes' house appears to have been L-shaped, with a terrace on its eastern side. While without a veranda, the cottage may have had French doors connecting the principal ground floor rooms with the garden. It was almost certainly conceived as a cottage orne or ornamental cottage for a gentleman.

The Vaucluse estate was purchased by William Charles Wentworth (1790–1872) in 1827. Wentworth set about improving the estate, adding stables designed by George Cookney in 1829. Many of Wentworth's additions (those seen from Sydney Harbour) were in the Gothic Revival style of Sydney's Government House and included extensions of c. 1834–1842 attributed to James Hume, a drawing room attributed to Mortimer Lewis (1844–47) and a verandah with Gothic Revival detailing by J. F. Hilly, added in 1861–62. Wentworth's choice of the fashionably antiquarian Gothic Revival style was probably to suggest his ancient family lineage – he was related to the Wentworths of Wentworth Woodhouse in Yorkshire, England and could trace his ancestry over twenty generations. Wentworth's immediate family connections were not so prestigious. His wife, Sarah (née Cox, 1805–1880), the daughter of ex-convicts, worked as a milliner before their marriage in 1829 and suffered social isolation for having borne two of their children out of wedlock. Wentworth's own illegitimacy, convict mother and father's near conviction for highway robbery also were known. His attacks on the "Exclusives" in colonial politics put him at odds with leading colonial families.

As early as 1831, following the death of Sarah Wentworth's father, Francis Cox, William Charles Wentworth intended to have land consecrated and to build a family vault at Vaucluse. This did not eventuate in his lifetime but Wentworth had informed his family that he wished to be buried near a rocky outcrop on the hill above Parsley Bay. The site was visible from the front verandah of the house and overlooked both the harbour and the estate.

==== Death of Wentworth ====
After Wentworth's death at the family's rented estate, Merly House, near Wimborne, Dorset, England in March 1872, Sarah Wentworth sent her son-in-law Thomas Fisher a sketch of the location and instructions that a vault was to be hewn out of a large single rock on the slope but "left in its natural state outside". Sarah informed Fisher that she would travel to Brussels to order marble for the vault and would also bring "some Iron gates and railing to enclose it". The vault was to be large – Eliza wrote: 'it was Papa's wish to have my grandfather, my Uncle & Willie & Bell & poor Nellie & we should all like to be there when our time comes.

Sarah accepted the New South Wales Government's proposal to accord her husband the honours of a public funeral. The funeral service for William Charles Wentworth was held at St Andrew's Cathedral, Sydney, on 6 May 1873. The only women admitted to the congregation of 2,000 were female members of Wentworth's family. The cathedral's interior was entirely draped in black cloth, including the floor. On the polished cedar coffin lay "two wreaths of immortelles and other plants mostly indigenous to Vaucluse". At the conclusion of the service mourners proceeded to Vaucluse, the procession being so lengthy that "when the first portion had reached ... Rushcutters Bay, the last of the carriages had not left George Street". The day had been proclaimed a public holiday and 60,000 to 70,000 people lined the route to pay their respects.

==== Interment ====
At the vault, the consecration of the burial site was followed by an address by Frederic Barker, the Bishop of Sydney. Sir James Martin delivered a lengthy oration praising Wentworth's many achievements. He lamented there was "no Westminster Abbey in which to place the bones of our illustrious dead" but that 'here, under the blue Australian sky, and by the shores of the broad and blue Pacific, and in a corner of one of Nature's loveliest landscapes we are about to lay his remains ... This monument will be a lasting and conspicuous memorial, visible to all who enter and to all who leave our port'.

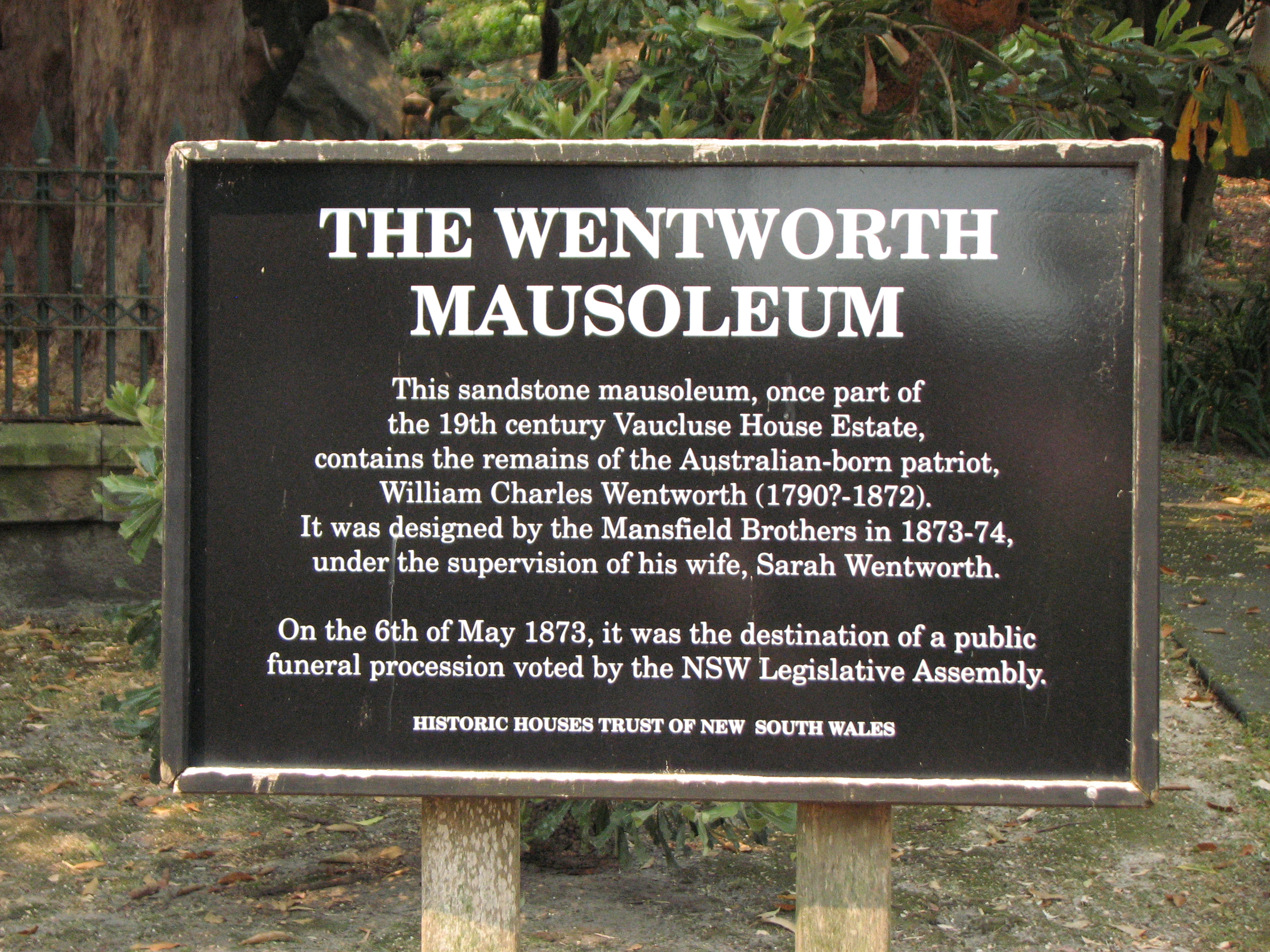
Sign at the Wentworth Mausoleum acknowledging Sarah Wentworth's role in supervising its design

Following the sentence of burial, Wentworth's coffin was lowered into the vault, which, according to newspaper descriptions, was constructed as Sarah had desired: '... between some of these boulders ... the vault had been prepared, cut out of the solid rock, and built of brick and cemented inside. It is 28 feet long, 13 feet wide, and 7 feet high. It is shelved all round with large slabs of slate resting upon stone supports, and arches of brick rise upon iron girders. The inner space is 7 feet by 13 feet and the whole vault is thoroughly drained and complete. Mr Alexander Dean, builder ... constructed ... it. It is intended that in a short time a chapel shall be built over the vault to contain the sarcophagus.'

The remains of three Wentworth children – Isabella, Sarah Eleanor and William Charles – had been brought from Europe to be re-interred in the vault. Sarah commissioned the architects Mansfield Brothers to design a chapel to be constructed over the vault. The chapel's Gothic Revival design seemingly was intended to complement the estate's other Gothic style buildings. By November 1873 the chapel was still incomplete: "Men are working, but as Miss W said they are drunk and away oftener than at work". The stone and iron palisade fence was erected by early March 1874.

The rock outcrops and native vegetation on Parsley Hill that once formed a backdrop to the mausoleum have been supplanted by residential development and it has lost its visual relationship to Vaucluse House, however, the chapel and vault remain relatively isolated within the stone and iron palisading...The brass plaque commemorating Sarah Eleanor may have been responsible for the long-held belief that her mother, Sarah Wentworth, was buried in the mausoleum. Despite her desire for the family to "all rest together in our native place", Sarah was buried in July 1880 in Ocklynge Cemetery at Eastbourne, Sussex. The Wentworths' second son, Fitzwilliam, died in Sydney on 8 August 1915 and following a service at St Michael's Church, Vaucluse, he was buried in the mausoleum. The vault was then permanently sealed.

=== Management of the mausoleum ===
On 14 October 1927 the Church of England Property Trust, Diocese of Sydney, executed a deed of covenant to administer the mausoleum. In 1997 the Historic Houses Trust (now Sydney Living Museums), with the approval of the Wentworth family, leased the mausoleum from the Anglican Church Property Trust for 99 years and is responsible for its conservation and maintenance. Although now separated from Vaucluse House by residential development, the mausoleum is still regarded as an integral part of the remaining estate. It is located in nearby Chapel Road and the grounds are open to visitors.' The Friends of the Historic Houses Trust fundraised through events and tours to contribute $12,500 towards the cost of conservation of the Wentworth Mausoleum.

== Description ==
The Wentworth Mausoleum was commissioned by Sarah Wentworth (1805–1880) to house the remains of William Charles Wentworth (1790–1872) and other members of her family. It was designed by Mansfield Brothers architects, in March 1872 – March 1874, having been conceived as a combination of built (mausoleum chapel, vault, palisade fence and gates) and natural elements. It was built over a rock from which Wentworth liked to view Sydney Harbour during his residence at Vaucluse (1827–1853 and 1861–62). This rock had an important role in vistas to and from Vaucluse House (owing to its siting north-east of the house) and in relation to the carriage drive by which visitors approached the house. The rock was overshadowed by a ridge / escarpment immediately to the east, which, with associated boulders, was to give the Mausoleum chapel and appropriately picturesque backdrop. By the early 20th century the Mausoleum was surrounded on three sides by lineal plantings of brushbox (Lophostemon confertus). The site also contains an evergreen / southern magnolia / bull bay (Magnolia grandiflora) and regenerated sweet pittosporums (P.undulatum), a Port Jackson fig (Ficus rubiginosa) and coastal honeysuckle (Banksia integrifolia).

'The small sandstone chapel retains much of its original details. The roof retains its original polychrome terracotta tiles [in bands of red and cream] although the pinnacle at each corner has lost its finial. These were re-instated as part of restoration work by Clive Lucas, Stapleton & Partners in c. 1993. Externally, the building's east and west elevations have been painted and lined in imitation of smooth ashlar (i.e. over actual stone ashlar), while the interior has a marble dado and plastered and painted upper walls. Cast plaster corbels in the shape of an angel support the roof trusses, and, at each junction of the purlins and rafters, there is a timber star.

Dominating the chapel's interior is a large Carrara marble neo-classical sarcophagus commissioned by Sarah Wentworth in Europe in 1872. The floor is marble with black and white marble laid in a chequerboard forming a wide border. At the centre of the room is a raised slab that conceals the actual entrance to the crypt. The western elevation contains a stained glass window incorporating the Wentworth coat of arms and brass plaques on the walls commemorate members of the family. The original solid timber outer door was removed in the 1960s when the copper hood was installed over the entrance. The decorative iron inner gates are original.'

Posthumous portrait busts of William Charles Wentworth (marked Bellman and Ivey of London) and Sarah Wentworth (by Achille Simonetti of Sydney), 1885, formerly located in the mausoleum, were transferred to Vaucluse House by the family in 1928, where they stand at the eastern end of the entrance hall.

Just inside the door to the Mausoleum, after a section of hexagonal terracotta tiles, is a black and white marble mosaic depicting the twin-tailed Triton (the son of Neptune in Roman mythology) blowing his shell trumpet forms the threshold. The mosaic, laid in opus vermiculatum, was described as a "Pompeian pavement" and is most likely a copy of a c. 1st–2nd century AD Roman mosaic acquired by Wentworth during the family's Grand Tour to Italy in 1858–59. The tails and fins of fish, fragments of the larger mosaic from which it has been cut, can be seen above the head and horn. A similar mosaic can be seen in the apodyterium of the Women's Baths at Pompeii.

The Mausoleum's interior has three commemorative plaques on its side walls. Two are on the left hand side looking in, one on the right. Of the two on the left, the one nearest the door dates to c. 1960 and commemorates William Charles Wentworth (1871–1949) and his wife Florence Denise Griffiths (1883–1960). The other further from the door and close to the sarcophagus is a plaque to Sarah Eleanor Wentworth (daughter of W.C. & Sarah Wentworth), who died 1847 in Corfu and of Isabella Christina Wentworth (1840–1856), a daughter of W.C. & Sarah Wentworth, who is interred here. The plaque on the right hand side wall close to the sarcophagus is to William Charles Wentworth (1827–1859), eldest son of W. C. & Sarah Wentworth, and Fitzwilliam Wentworth (1833–1915), second son of W. C. & Sarah Wentworth. In 2015, a fourth commemorative plaque was installed within the Mausoleum's interior in memory of Sarah Wentworth herself (1805–1880).

=== Condition ===
As at 11 June 2009, the physical condition is good. The Mausoleum, its rock platform, iron palisade fence and plantings are intact. The original site was subdivided for the construction of the Wentworth Memorial Church in 1965–67, which occupies a rock plateau that overshadows the Mausoleum.

=== Modifications and dates ===
c. 1965 – Mausoleum original solid timber outer door was removed (probably owing to decay) when the copper hood was installed over the entrance. Footpath and stairs to the Wentworth Memorial Church on the rock plateau above the Mausoleum added at this period.

== Heritage listing ==
As at 11 June 2009, the Wentworth Mausoleum's significance is related to Vaucluse House, one of the few 19th century houses on Sydney Harbour retaining a significant part of its original estate setting. The Wentworth Mausoleum (by Mansfield Brothers, architects, 1872–1874) with its combination of built (chapel, vault, palisade fence and gates) and natural elements (rock plinth, sheltering rock escarpment and plantings) is significant as a work that demonstrates a continuity of Picturesque Movement landscape planning and architectural design (generally employing the Gothic Revival style) on the Vaucluse estate. This architectural and landscape planning were influenced by Sydney's first and second Government Houses with a result that inner Sydney Harbour was "bookended" by Gothic Revival complexes.

== See also ==
- Australian non-residential architectural styles
- Vaucluse House
- Wentworth Memorial Church
