= Vaucluse House =

Heritage house in Sydney, Australia

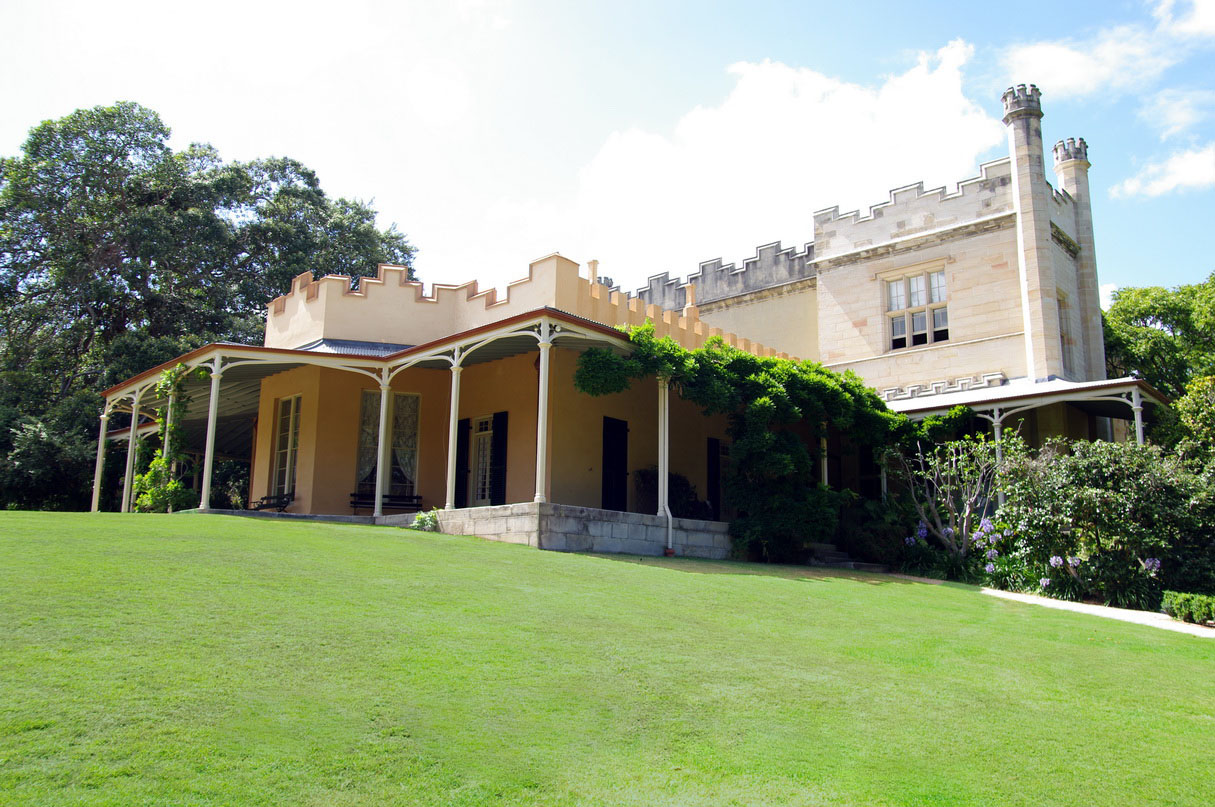
- Vaucluse House, Sydney
- Interactive map of the Vaucluse House area
- Etymology: Fontaine de Vaucluse

General information
- Status: Completed
- Type: House, re-purposed as a museum
- Architectural style: Gothic Revival
- Location: 69A Wentworth Road, Vaucluse in Sydney, New South Wales, Australia
- Coordinates: 33°51′20″S 151°16′25″E
- Current tenants: Sydney Living Museums
- Groundbreaking: 1803
- Construction started: 1803
- Completed: 1839
- Client: Henry Browne Hayes
- Owner: Museums of History NSW

Technical details
- Grounds: 11 hectares (28 acres)

Design and construction
- Architect: W. C. Wentworth (attrib.)
- Developer: Sir Henry Browne Hayes

New South Wales Heritage Register
- Official name: Vaucluse House
- Type: Built and landscape
- Criteria: a., c., d., e., f.
- Designated: 2 April 1999
- Reference no.: 00955
- Type: Historic Landscape
- Category: Landscape – Cultural
- Builders: Sir Henry Browne Hayes; W. C. Wentworth (attrib.)

Vaucluse House is a heritage-listed residence, colonial farm and country estate and now tourist attraction, house museum and public park, formerly the home of statesman William Charles Wentworth and his family. It is located at 69a Wentworth Road, Vaucluse in the Municipality of Woollahra local government area of New South Wales, Australia. Completed between 1803 and 1839 in the Gothic Revival style, its design was attributed to W. C. Wentworth and built by Sir Henry Browne Hayes and W. C. Wentworth. The property is owned by Museums of History NSW, an agency of the Government of New South Wales. The site was added to the New South Wales State Heritage Register on 2 April 1999.

Vaucluse House is a 19th-century estate with house, kitchen wing, stables and outbuildings, surrounded by 11 hectares (28 acres) of formal gardens and grounds located on the south-eastern shores of Port Jackson. The house is one of the few 19th-century houses near Sydney Harbour retaining a significant part of its original setting.

== History ==
The Vaucluse Estate, located on Cadigal land, comprises the land granted to Thomas Laycock in 1793, being 32 hectares (80 acres); 10 hectares (25 acres) granted to Robert Cardell in 1795; 16 hectares (40 acres) granted to Francis MacGlynn; and 150 hectares (370 acres) granted to William Wentworth. In 1803, the Irish convict Sir Henry Browne Hayes purchased Laycock's grant and a grant adjacent to it. Hayes erected a cottage and other buildings. He named the property Vaucluse, probably after the Italian poet Petrarch's Fontaine-de-Vaucluse near Avignon, France. Vaucluse was leased until 1814. It was left vacant after this except for a year's rental to Captain John Piper in 1814.

The original Vaucluse House was built by Sir Henry Brown Hayes, who had been transported to New South Wales in 1802 for kidnapping the daughter of a wealthy Irish banker. Governor King considered Hayes "a restless, troublesome character" and was keen to move him 3 kilometres (1.9 mi) away from Sydney. So in 1803 Hayes was granted permission to purchase the land and house, which was originally granted to Thomas Laycock in 1793 and Robert Cardell in 1795. An avid admirer of the 14th-century poet Petrarch, Hayes named the house after Petrarch's Fontaine de Vaucluse, the famous spring near the town l'Isle sur la Sorgue in what is today the Department of Vaucluse in the South of France. He built a small but charming cottage and several outbuildings. 20 hectares (50 acres) were cleared for agriculture and several thousand fruit trees were planted, none of which survive. Newspaper accounts describe it as a small but very charming farm. There is some warrant for the story that Hayes surrounded his property with turf from Ireland to keep out the snakes. In 1812 Hayes was pardoned by Governor Macquarie and sailed to Ireland where he lived another 20 years. Ownership of the property became uncertain until it was acquired in 1822 by Captain John Piper.

"It was then a mere waste of land until Sir Henry Hayes built a dwelling house upon it and cultivated a garden". This is how one observer described the Vaucluse improvements soon after Sir Henry Browne Hayes acquired 42 hectares (105 acres) in this isolated spot of Port Jackson. Naming the property after the village of Vaucluse in the south of France, he built a small cottage and in 1803 set about transforming his "mere waste of land", building two huts and outbuildings, clearing 20 hectares (50 acres) for agricultural uses and planting several thousand fruit trees. None of these survive. Hayes left the colony in 1812, his estate was bought by Captain John Piper in 1822, the newspapers describing it as "a small farm". Between 1813 and 1827 the estate passed through several hands.

=== William Charles Wentworth ===
On 27 August 1827 William Charles Wentworth who, together with Gregory Blaxland and Lt.William Lawson, was an explorer of the Blue Mountains, and a barrister, author and co-editor, and publisher of The Australian newspaper, purchased the 16-hectare (40-acre) estate from Captain John Piper. He consolidated the estate through an additional 150-hectare (370-acre) grant brought the harbourside estate to 208 hectares (515 acres). Wentworth used Vaucluse as a family home and as a setting to enhance his status as a public figure.

W. C. Wentworth was born on board the Surprise moored off Norfolk Island in 1790, to surgeon D'Arcy Wentworth and former Irish convict mother, Catherine Crowley. He spent his early years on the island, returning to Sydney with his parents to settle in Parramatta, where D'Arcy became a prosperous land owner. In 1802 William Charles was sent to England to be educated. On his return in 1810 Governor Macquarie appointed him as acting provost-general, granting him 710 hectares (1,750 acres) along the Nepean River. On 15 October 1810 Wentworth rode his father's horse to victory in the first official horse race on Australian soil, in Hyde Park, Sydney.

In 1813 he, with Blaxland and Lawson, led an expedition that crossed the Blue Mountains, with four servants and an Aboriginal guide. As a reward W. C. Wentworth was granted another 400 hectares (1,000 acres). He continued to assist his father with his business activities, combining farming interests with sandalwood trading in the South Pacific, before returning to England in 1816 to study law at Cambridge University. While there he wrote a book published in London in 1818 "A Statistical, Historical and Political Description of the Colony of New South Wales". He argued for political reform and liberalisation, advocating elected assembly for NSW, trial by jury and free settler emigration. Wentworth returned to NSW in 1824. In 1827 his father died and he inherited his property, making him one of the wealthiest men in the colony. Purchasing land in eastern Sydney, he built Vaucluse House. From the time of his grant of 150 hectares (370 acres) Wentworth began sub-dividing the land.

Wentworth's total estate was 208 hectares (515 acres); his estate stretching from the Macquarie Lighthouse on South Head to the eastern heights of Rose Bay. Wentworth and his wife Sarah Cox moved to the estate with their growing family in 1828, carrying out major building and ground works through 25 years of occupancy. By the 1830s the Wentworth family had made many visible improvements at Vaucluse, including turrets on the house, a sandstone stable in 1829 by architect George Cookney, a large kitchen wing and convict barracks.

Conrad Martens' 1840 sketch from Vaucluse Bay shows a clear view to the residence and what appears to be a well-established climber (possibly Wisteria sinensis) over the verandah. Wentworth did further work on the main house in the late 1840s including adding the verandah crenulations. At this time the vine seen in Martens' 1840 sketch was possibly removed to carry out this work. There is no fountain apparent. To the west is a dense grove of trees (possibly native) and a large Norfolk Island pine (Araucaria heterophylla) 25–30 years old and probably planted in the pre-1827 period.

Colonial Secretary, Alexander Macleay received the Yulan magnolia (M.denudata), a small tree from south-eastern China, at Elizabeth Bay, in 1836. From the 1850s onwards it is listed for sale in nurseries such as the Darling Nursery, Sydney and Guilfoyle's Exotic Nursery in Double Bay. This tree continues to thrive in the Vaucluse House pleasure garden. Vaucluse House and its furnishings were clearly intended to provide the correct social surroundings for Wentworth and his wife's immediate family of seven daughters and three sons. Sir Henry Browne Hayes' modest structure disappeared within the building fabric of the Wentworth's gothic mansion. The public areas were designed for effect and the Drawing and Dining Rooms, long hall and sweeping staircase was as fashionable as the Wentworth's taste would allow. Vaucluse House was never completed due to factors which included the 1840s depression and Wentworth's intentions for a full facade, bedroom additions and formal entrance are unrealised.

Although Wentworth was a prominent and important figure in colonial politics, he was never welcomed into the Sydney "exclusives" club. Initially Wentworth identified himself with the cause of the emancipists and native-born Australians, establishing the first non-government newspaper, The Australian, to agitate for reform. He entered the Parliament of New South Wales in 1843, a rather dynamic time in Australian politics. Wentworth chaired a committee formed to draft a new constitution for NSW. The democrats and radicals accused him of attempting to create a "bunyip aristocracy" that gave voting rights to the wealthy land owners and squatter class in the colony. After a number of re-drafts a democratic constitution was accepted and responsible government formed, although the NSW Legislative Council remained unelected. Wentworth also had a proposed plan to purchase the entire south island of New Zealand from the Maori tribes.

Wentworth regarded Vaucluse House as an estate—a private residence with outbuildings. Several outbuildings remain and their function can be easily identified. It acted as a base for a man who helped form the Australian Patriotic Association, who had one of his constitutional drafts serve as the basis for a colonial government granted by London, was a member of the Legislative Council, who was an active player in the improvement of education and was involved in the establishment of The University of Sydney and was Chair for the Select Committee that drafted the 1854 constitutional document.

==== John Hosking lease ====
In March 1853 the family sold most of the contents of the house by auction and moved to Europe. In December the house and 66 hectares (163 acres) within the fences was leased to John Hosking for three years. When they left for England in 1854, the estate was well established. The 1854–56 lease agreement to John Hosking required him to keep "the park, gardens, orangeries, vineyard and buildings, fencing, hedges, ditches, gates, bridges, stiles, rails, poles, posts and drains in good and sufficient order". No mention is made of the fountain. There is also reference to gravel being rolled; from this it can be assumed that either the garden paths and /or the drive were gravelled. Bridges referred to would be of two types—vehicular for crossing the creek and pedestrian. From the available literature, pictorial information, sub-division plans and municipal maps of the Wentworth Estate it can be established that the garden and grounds were most characteristically the curtilage of an estate residence completed in the 1860s and reaching maturity in the 1880s.

==== Subsequent occupation by the Wentworth family ====
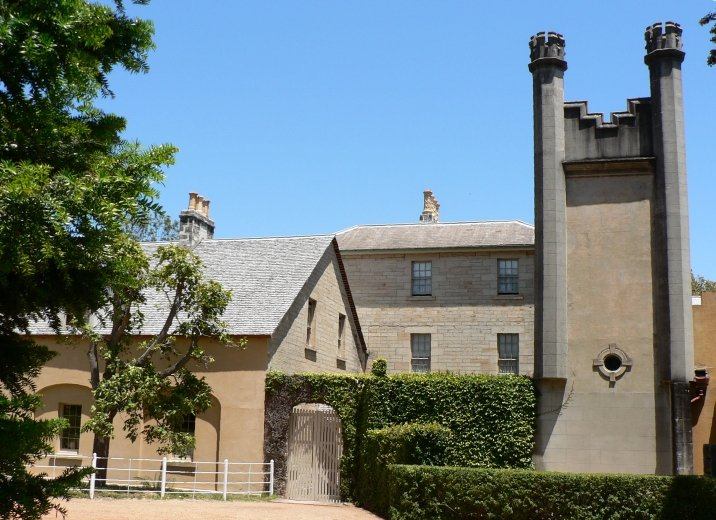
The eastern tower

When the Wentworths returned briefly in 1861–62, many improvements were made to the pleasure grounds. The gothic revival iron verandah was built and fountain installed in the pleasure garden. The Wentworths returned with advanced European tastes. Renovations at Vaucluse were necessary after several years of relative neglect by tenants, and the present verandah with its Gothic Revival columns replaced an earlier flat roofed verandah. Use of the estate grounds extended to the harbour side Beach Paddock. The family introduced new plantings to the gardens and orchards and innovations in fencing shaped and formalised the approaches to the property. At this time the fountain on the front lawn was built.

The Wentworths returned to England in 1862, the estate being occupied by various agents, relations and members of the immediate family. Visitors have enjoyed the spectacular display of the climber Wisteria sinensis on the house's verandah every spring since 1862.

In 1867, a very dry year for Sydney, the fire brigade was called to a fire at Vaucluse House: at this time the estate was said to be in the care of Wentworth's servants. Fire just penetrated the garden but the brigade prevented it reaching the house or destroying the garden. The pictorial material available for this period, including the Woollahra Municipal Council plan by Higginbotham and Robinson (1889) which shows the fence pattern, outbuildings and entry road, gives a clear picture of the layout of the period. The sketch from the "Town and Country Journal" (1873) shows a well-established front shrubbery, fountain and a large Araucaria in the front lawn. The entry drive is shown with young plants at regular intervals—possibly an avenue or the beginnings of a hedge. To the east of the drive is a clump of giant bamboo. Rebecca Martens' views of 1869 placed close to the photographs of the same view clearly show the character of the estate. Her view of the front of the residence shows a curving drive, front shrubbery and two dominant Araucarias. The side view of the eastern area outside the kitchen, shows the Norfolk Island hibiscus (Lagunaria patersonia) tree nearly as tall as the two storey building. A small tree outside the kitchen is probably the existing Illawarra flame tree (Brachychiton acerifolium). Banana plants are also seen outside the kitchen and the carriage loop is less manicured than its present appearance. The iron estate fencing, seen later in this area and shown on the 1889 Higginbotham and Robinson plan, does not appear in the sketch. It appears that the drive and pasture areas were fenced earlier and the fencing around the house came later.

From the late 1870s the house was occupied by family, friends or caretakers. Wentworth died in England in 1872 and a public funeral was held in Sydney in 1873. Sarah and one of her daughters took up residence at Vaucluse during the slow completion of the Mausoleum in Chapel Road, returning to England in 1875 to visit family. Sarah only returned to Australia briefly. Even after William's death in 1872, Sarah and unmarried daughter Eliza continued an active lifelong interest in the property, even from abroad.

=== Resumption by the NSW Government ===
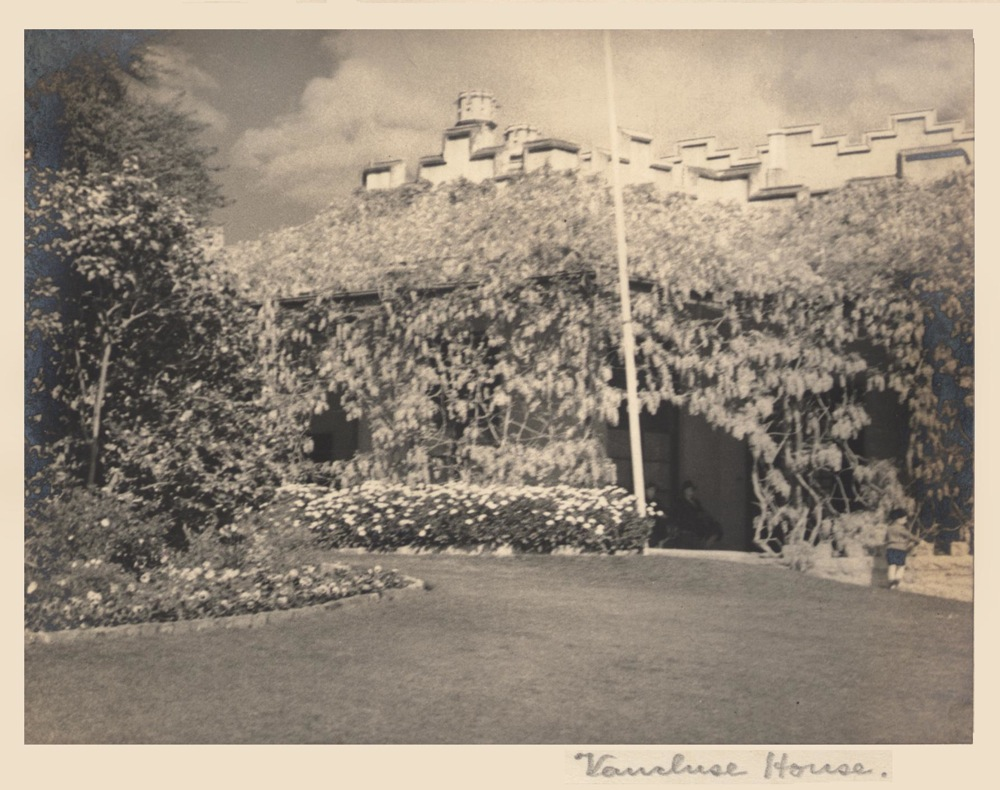
The estate's gardens in the 1930s

In 1900 the contents of the house were auctioned, and the house remained unoccupied until 1911. Then some 11 hectares (28 acres) including house and garden, were resumed by the Government of New South Wales for use as a public reserve. In 1910 the preservation of Vaucluse House was assured by Government resumption of the present estate of approximately 4.0 hectares (10 acres). The Department of Lands was apparently charged with establishing a public recreation ground at Vaucluse. The house and estate were first managed by an Honorary Board of Trustees as part of the Nielsen Park-Vaucluse Trust. Providing for the current needs took precedence over preservation and the ruins of the convict barracks, workers cottages, fences and stock shed were demolished. The Trust replaced the original gates in 1910–20 with four sets of gates. The square pillars and iron gates of the original Vaucluse Estate entrance were removed from Vaucluse Road near Nielsen Park and resited near the original driveway at the intersection of Wentworth Road and Olola Avenue. The house, although virtually empty, was open on weekends and holidays. In 1917 two towers were added to the eastern facade and the crenulations continued across the front facade to give a semblance of completeness. The character of the garden changed in detail more than layout'. In the 1920s further changes took place including the formalisation of the carriage circle with the removal of the Bunya Bunya Pine and construction of a grassed loop. By the mid 1920s almost all evidence of the Wentworth entry road had been lost and was replaced by Wentworth Road. Olola Avenue was built. Until this decade substantial areas of cleared land survived in the east and west.

In the 1920s the house was opened to the public and great changes began in its grounds. The kiosk (now tearooms) was built, new pedestrian bridges built over the creek, and the ground level around the western side of the stables was radically altered for footpaths. Original gravel paths were bituminised, last remnants of the orchard and vineyard removed and the original entry drive disappeared. Wentworth's precious bushland to the west and east was subdivided. In the 1930s Depression there was much relief work activity in the park. Concrete paths were laid, stone walls contained the creek. Much work was done on the carriage loop including building stone walls, kerbing and arbours. An extensive rose garden was established in the central lawn. A rockery was formed around the bakery and the garden embellished with beds of azaleas, cannas, cinerarias and begonias—changing the 19th-century estate into a 20th-century municipal park.

A Friends of Vaucluse House group formed well before the formation of the Historic Houses Trust of NSW.

Further additions and alterations were made in the period up until 1966. In 1968 responsibility for the house and grounds was transferred to the NSW National Parks & Wildlife Service when it was declared a historic site under the National Parks and Wildlife Act of 1967. Over 200 indigenous trees were replanted and refurbishment of the house interiors was announced in 1978. The Trustees maintained their position until 1980 when the property became the responsibility of the Historic Houses Trust of NSW.

In 1981 the property was transferred to the NSW Historic Houses Trust, who commenced work on a long-term conservation plan for the grounds. This was based on a study of the site's history, contemporary documentation such as paintings, sketches, family papers, photographs, and research on 19th-century garden practises in Australia. Today, Vaucluse House is one of the few 19th-century houses on Sydney Harbour retaining a significant part of its original setting. One distinguishing surviving characteristic of the 19th-century estate is its careful division into specific areas, both functional and ornamental, such as pleasure garden, kitchen garden, rear service yard, paddocks, carriageway, creek, estate backdrop, beach paddock.

In July 1981 the Government Architect's Branch of the NSW Public Works Department was commissioned by the Historic Houses Trust to carry out a study of the Vaucluse House grounds. The aim was to trace their development from their beginnings to the present. Historic research undertaken by the Trust's researcher, Joy Hughes also informed this work. They study divided the history into eight chronological periods, derived from phases of ownership, major events and periods when a substantial amount of information was available. The current (1982) archaeological investigations filled out some gaps in knowledge about the property's history.

=== Vaucluse House gardens ===
Several 20th-century mature palms from front garden (public reserve) near the "approach road" (drive) and sandstone piers were removed, sold for replanting, c. 1996 to recover a partial view from the house to Vaucluse Bay—this included some casuarinas.

From 1999 under the direction of curatorial adviser Dr James Broadbent and head gardener Dave Gray prepared a conservation policy for a small plot of land adjacent to the house's kitchen wing. Since the early 20th century the site of the original kitchen garden at Vaucluse House had been used first as a rubbish tip and then as a car park. It was decided to reinstate a kitchen garden there using heritage seeds imported from the Henry Doubleday Research Association in the UK via quarantine (basing it on varieties of vegetable and fruit that were available in the era of the Wentworths' occupation of the estate—1827–1853.

Property staff undertook research to find out whether vegetable seeds from the era were available in Australia and if there were any references to preferred varieties at Vaucluse House estate. In 1830 it was reported that "in this garden there grows the most delicious fruit in the colony". A number of seed-saving organisations provided old varieties and in many cases also gave the date on which these were first introduced into Australia. The Diggers Club in Victoria and Eden Seeds in NSW supplied as many as 33 varieties of vegetable seed listed in early catalogues.

These were planted in the new kitchen garden in time for the first Kitchen Garden Festival which was held in March 2000. A variety of fruit trees were also planted including Moorpark apricots, Greengage plums, pomegranates (Punica granatum) and various types of apples. The garden today (2010) grows approximately 90 varieties of vegetables, some of which have survived in Australia for over a century. Many such as Musselburgh leeks, Cos lettuce and sugarloaf cabbage are still found in local greengrocers today. Rarities include root crops salsify and scorzonera (vegetable oyster), both like thin parsnips. The rhubarb variety "Victoria" has green not red stems.

Sir Henry Browne Hayes's Vaucluse Cottage still exists (vestibule, little tea room, east end of the dining room, stone walls within the drawing room, the c. 1828–30 little drawing room located on its former terrace), although completely engulfed by Wentworth's additions of c. 1828–30 and c. 1834–42. There is also a strong possibility that the Wentworth kitchen garden had been Hayes's. Since the formation of the Friends of Vaucluse and subsequently, the Friends of the Historic Houses Trust, funds have been raised from events at the property to support its interpretation and presentation. These include new estate fencing ($8500), the annual Kitchen Garden Festival, "Up the Garden Path" talks, annual Carols by Candlelight and more. Sydney Living Museums celebrated 100 years of Vaucluse House as a museum with a free open day on Sunday, 11 October 2015, including demonstrations of traditional needlework techniques and a display of rare treasures from William Charles Wentworth's personal collection.

In winter 2016 the drawing room refurbishment got underway—what is considered to be one of the finest surviving colonial interiors in Australia – design and create new window furnishings, re-upholster the furniture including 5 Wentworth-provenanced chairs using authentic sources, traditional methods and trades. In autumn 2017 the works are almost completed, including the drawing room and the orientation rooms. The orientation room is being redesigned to enhance visitors' understanding of the site's complex history. The results will be unveiled in April 2017. This is a display, orientation and rest area for visitors. The ground floor room, which may have been Wentworth's estate office, has been redesigned to share stories of the site, from its enduring Aboriginal connections, its ownership by Sir Henry Browne Hayes and occupation by the Wentworth family to its transfer into public ownership and creation of a museum, including the important role played by Sydney Living Museums. The multi-layered display is a mix of bespoke joinery, interpretive panels and audiovisual components.

== Features ==
=== Ground floor ===
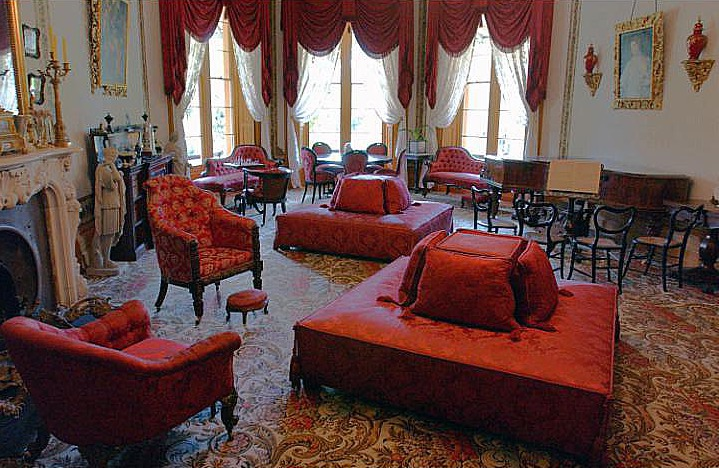
Drawing Room

1. KITCHEN The kitchen is at the centre of the large two-storey service wing, constructed in 1829. As in most colonial houses, the service wing was a separate building to distance the risk of fire from the main house. Here the cook and her staff prepared all meals for family, guests and servants. The dresser, food safe and cast iron cooking range are original.
2. SCULLERY The scullery is where washing up was done. Dirty water was emptied into the slop drain.
3. DAIRY AND LARDER The dairy (for milk, butter and cheese preparation) and larder (for food storage) reflect the operation of Vaucluse as a self-sufficient colonial estate.
4. CELLARS The two-roomed cellars were used for the cool storage of food and wine. The inner room retains its arched brick bins for bottled wine while hooks for hanging salted and cured meats survive on the original lath and plaster ceilings.
5. HOUSEKEEPER’S ROOM The housekeeper's room was the centre of domestic operations. The housekeeper was responsible for linen and the supervision of female domestic servants.
6. BUTLER’S PANTRY The pantry was an office strategically located for the head of the household staff to oversee activities in the house and arrivals at the property. Here lamps were cleaned, refuelled and wicks trimmed; and china, glass and silverware cleaned polished and stored.
7. FAMILY HISTORY ROOM In 1900 this room was used as a library. Today it houses an exhibition of the Wentworth family's history.
8. BREAKFAST ROOM The breakfast room is in part of the house built from 1837 to 1840. Most large colonial houses had a second dining room for informal family use. The decorative paint scheme by the firm Lyon, Cottier & Co dates from the 1880s while the carved oak furniture was purchased by Fitzwilliam Wentworth in England in c1872.
9. DINING ROOM The dining room is hung with family portraits in keeping with early 19th-century practice. The oak furniture belonged to the Wentworth family. The fine Gothic Revival sideboard and cupboards date from c1845 while the dining table and chairs (with their embossed Spanish leather upholstery) may have been part of a consignment of furniture sent from Europe in 1859. The floor of mid-19th-century Italian glazed tiles is unusual and possibly a concession to the Australian climate. The chimney piece is of marble from Marulan in southern New South Wales.
10. LITTLE TEA ROOM The little tea room's joinery suggests that it was one of Wentworth's first additions to the house after 1828. It has been furnished to reflect its use as a small informal sitting room. Cool in summer, with French doors opening onto the eastern verandah, in winter the room's small size ensured it was easily heated.
11. DRAWING ROOM The drawing room was formed partly within the walls of Sir Henry Browne Hayes original stone cottage and completed in 1847. The floral wallpaper border, plaster cornice, Italian marble fire surround and cast iron grate are all original. The drawing room was intended as a setting for potential suitors to meet the Wentworth daughters, owing to Sarah Wentworth's social isolation. By 1853 when the original contents were sold before the Wentworth family's departure for Europe, the room contained furniture in Brazilian rosewood with crimson damask upholstery. Today the room contains a collection of copies of old master paintings acquired by the Wentworth family in Italy, including copies of Flora after Titian, a Penitent Magdalene after Guido Reni and a Madonna and Child after Murillo.

=== First floor ===
1. SECOND ROOM The second room, as it was called in 1853, was a private family sitting room. The fireplace and grate are original. Furniture has been acquired based on an 1853 inventory of the house.
2. PRINCIPAL BEDROOM In 1853 the principal bedroom contained a winged wardrobe, chest of drawers and marble washstand. The four-post bed has been hung with a reproduction of a glazed chintz c1860 known to have been used in another Gothic Revival house, Greenoaks at Darling Point. The bed has the typical arrangement of three mattresses filled with straw, horsehair and feathers (bottom to top).
3. FITZWILLIAM’S ROOM IN THE HALL Vaucluse House was left incomplete in the mid-1840s and the large open upper hall was partitioned by cupboards to create a bedroom for Wentworth's second son, Fitzwilliam.

=== Second floor ===
1. CHILDREN’S ROOM The nursery was probably used for the four youngest Wentworth children aged between five and 12 years in 1853. The room is furnished as a typical children's room of the mid-19th century with children's furniture and toys. The metal beds are hung with gauze mosquito nets.
2. MISS WENTWORTH’S ROOM Miss Wentworth's room was named for the eldest unmarried Wentworth daughter. In 1853 it was shared by Sarah Eleanor and Eliza Sophia Wentworth.

== Description ==
=== Grounds / Estate ===
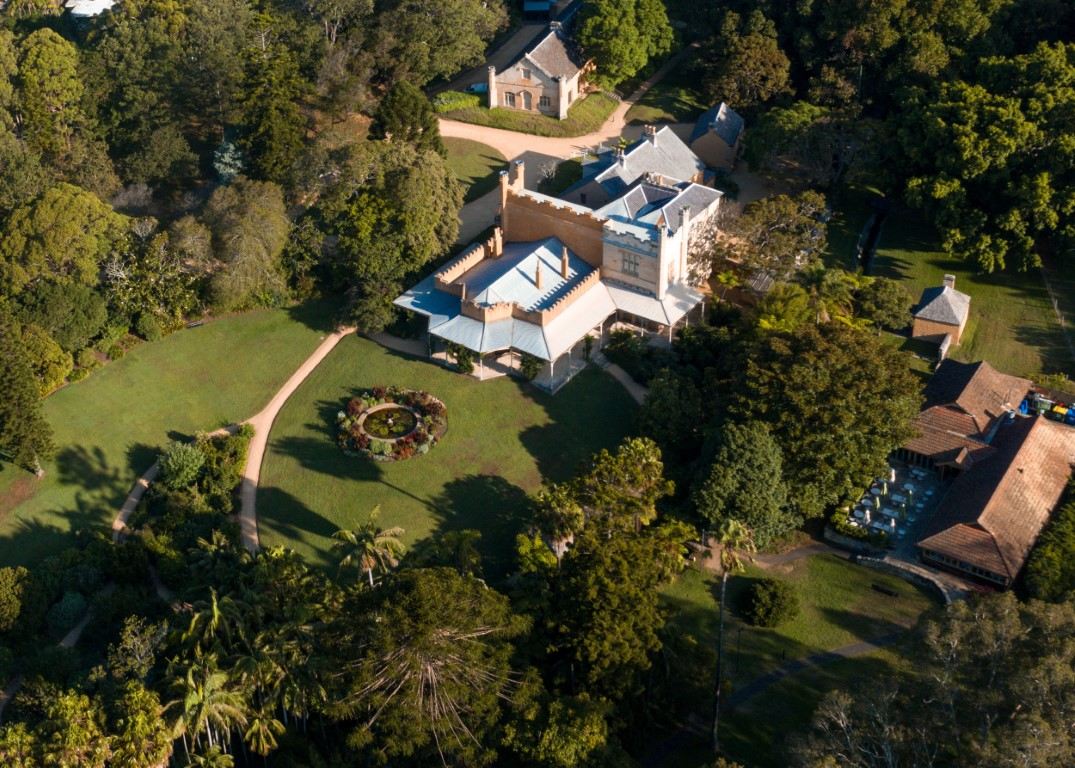
Aerial view of the estate

Major characteristics of the grounds were the distinct precincts, or zones, within which specific uses occurred, varying types of maintenance applied to separate zones, dominant plants found in the grounds, detailing characteristic of the period, and the rural character of the surroundings.

Eight distinct zones occur in the original property:

1. Main entry area – directly east of the residence: this is essentially a functional space for arrival and circulation;
2. The core garden, or pleasure garden—leading out from the verandah the formal lawn around the fountain, kept with close-cut grass and cut edges. Gravel paths with brick edge drains contained the formal lawn and led into the shrubbery. It is probably that the original shrubbery was smaller than its present size, being made up of relatively low plants, therefore allowing the residence to command a view to the harbour. In this period it was considered desirable that a residence be elevated and command a view. It would appear that the basic layout of the shrubbery has not changed much though much of its period detailing has been lost. Details in photographs show low-clipped shrub edging to beds, cut grass edges, gravel paths with brick drains where necessary, climbing plants trained over wire frame arches and bamboo hand rails on the bridges.
3. Park/pasture land outside the core garden and immediate house surrounds consisting of scattered tree groups in rough grass. This zone has been lost to a certain extent through the diminishing size of the estate, change in maintenance practices, and incursion of the shrubbery areas into what would have been parkland. However, with the proximity of residential development and its impact on the curtilage of the residence, some of these developments provide useful screening to the house;
4. vineyard and orchard. The positions of these have been generally identified from 1880s photographs and by a local resident, Mr. C.V. Nathan.
5. the Orangery for which a location has not been identified. Correspondence found by Mrs Joy Hughes indicates this orangery may have been in what is now called the South Paddock.
6. Gardens are mentioned in some of the literature pertaining to the property. These are likely to have been kitchen (vegetable) gardens. The only documentary evidence is an 1830 diagram and the cultivation lines noticeable in the 1931, 1951 and 1978 aerial photographs.
7. the estate backdrop was native forest occurring on the ridges and steeply sloping valley sides. This vegetation has suffered through the increase in residential development in the valley. All that remains of the once abundant native vegetation is the narrow band of vegetation along Olola Avenue.

During this (20th) century a number of typically characteristic and dominant plants have been removed from the grounds, the most important of these being:

- two Araucaria pines (in the front park and along Olola Avenue);
- a fig tree in the front park;
- two Magnolias to the west of the residence;
- willows (Salix sp.) along the creek.

The garden contains remnant indigenous plantings, 19th-century bush, the original principal path and drive layouts as well as its relationship with the harbour. The remains of the 19th Century garden however, are confined almost totally to the eastern side of the stream dividing the reserve. This garden may be considered in three parts: 1) the lawn before the house; 2) the shrubbery, and 3) the carriage loop before the stables.

1. The Central lawn – extending from the verandah to the shrubbery, embellished with a fine Victorian fountain, surrounded by a path. Views back to the house, over the rest of the garden and (partially obscured) to the harbour. Ground basin of fountain unsympathetically remodelled; brick edged gravel paths re-edged with concrete and resurfaced with asphalt. Bounded on west by an impressive mature planting of magnolias, araucarias and palms well underplanted with ferns, cliveas etc.,
2. Shrubbery – at the further (northern or harbour) end of the lawn. An intimate area irregularly planned with intersecting paths, refinished as above, and oddly shaped beds. To the east originally lay a paddock and the entrance drive which, with the subdivision of the estate has been destroyed and the levels altered. The area now had mature planting but of no particular value to the historic landscape.
3. Stable area – The carriage loop before the stable remains, somewhat altered in size and shape. Intrusion of modern petty planting in the form of beds and edgings could be removed easily to regain the former character. Separated from the central lawn by a small shrubbery, edged with tecoma (containing the remains of the original iron estate fencing and containing a large Ficus and good planting of camellias, dietes etc.
4. The kitchen garden – west of the (1–3) recreated c. 2001 on the site of the original kitchen garden.

Plant material in the parkland "estate" outside the estate fencing includes major trees of camphor laurel (Cinnamomum camphora), Chinese elm (Ulmus parvifolia) (several), brush box (Lophostemon confertus) (this species lines the driveway in the grounds' north-east and lines Olola Avenue's edge), cheese tree (Glochidion ferdinandi), two clumps of ornamental bamboo (Arundinaria sp./cv.), near the Vaucluse Bay beach a clump of giant bamboo (Bambusa balcooa), Hill's figs (Ficus microphylla 'Hillii'), golden Monterey cypress (Cupressus macrocarpa 'Aurea'), stone pine (Pinus pinea), Monterey pine (Pinus radiata) (specimen is dead), paperbarks (Melaleuca quinquenervia) (several north of the creek), London plane (Platanus x acerifolia) (several), black bean (Castanospermum australe), lilly pilly (Syzygium sp.), silky oaks (Grevillea robusta), Norfolk Island pine (Araucaria heterophylla), coastal banksia (B.integrifolia), black locust/false acacia (Robinia pseudoacacia), Queensland/macadamia nut (Macadamia integrifolia), Japanese cedar/tsugi (Cryptomeria japonica), hoop pines (Araucaria cunninghamii), kaffir plums (Harpephyllum afrum) (2), common oak (Quercus robur), pin oak (Q.palustris) (several), Indiana bean tree (Catalpa bignonioides) and blue Atlas cedar (Cedrus atlantica 'Glauca'). The creek is lined with a number of bananas (Musa ensete/sp.) north of the pleasure garden. Rear (south) of the house are a few remnant red cedar trees (Toona ciliata)

The pleasure garden inside the estate fencing is richly planted with species from the 19th century, including a shrubbery area, a border of trees and shrubs lining the eastern side of a long lawn between the house and the beach (originally, now Olola Avenue). Lining this border are major trees including a Port Jackson fig (Ficus rubiginosa), African yellow wood (Afrocarpus falcatus), evergreen magnolia/bull bay (M.grandiflora: S.USA) (2), Mediterranean cypress (Cupressus sempervirens), orchid tree (Bauhinia variegata cv.: S. America), native weeping lily pilly (Waterhousia floribunda), poison bush (Akocanthera oppositifolia: S. Africa), native sweet pittosporum (P.undulatum), sweet bay/bay laurel (Laurus nobilis: Mediterranean) and Cook's pine (Araucaria columnaris: New Caledonia: a specimen on the lawn).

North of the house and flanking the western side of the shrubbery to the creek are a large number of tall mature palms and emergent trees, including Lord Howe Island palms (Kentia fosteriana), bangalow/piccabeen palms (Archontophoenix cunninghamiana), cabbage tree palms (Livistona australis), Californian desert/fan palms (Washingtonia robusta), native frangipani (Hymenosporum flavum), soft tree ferns (Cyathea sp.), Bunya pine (Araucaria bidwillii), hoop pine (A.cunninghamii).

The pleasure garden with its expansive lawns and shrubbery of exotic curiosities replaces one of the pinnacle movements of 19th-century horticulture - the Gardenesque. Developed by influential Scottish-born landscape designer John Claudius (J.C.) Loudon, the popular style was a response, in part, to the flood of exotic plants available to Victorian era gardeners. Displayed as geographically and aesthetically distinct "specimens" to emphasise differences in foliage, flowers and form, the plants on show at Vaucluse House are examples of a period defined by prosperous ports, imperial politics, seafaring trade networks and exciting scientific discovery. This pleasure garden remains Sydney's most complete surviving example of the Gardenesque, over 150 years later.

Vaucluse House's pleasure garden contains plants from the Americas. Rio de Janeiro was the First Fleet's second port-of-call travelling from England to New South Wales. In August 1787, Captain Phillip stocked up on cotton, coffee, cocoa, prickly pear (Opuntia ficus-indica) and other crops of economic and agricultural importance from the Portuguese settlement, all intended for future new penal colony in Sydney. Ornamental plants from South America were cultivated in the colony from the earliest years, as trading ships continued to ply the Rio-Cape Town-Port Jackson route. Examples include blue ginger (Dichorisandra thrysiflora), Brazilian plume flower (Justicia carnea), floss flower (Ageratum/ Eupatorium), flame creeper (Pyrostegia venusta), Mexican viper (Maurandya barclayana), sandpaper vine /purple wreath (Petraea volubilis), violet church (Iochroma cyanea), tree fuchsia, (F.arborescens), dahlias, snail vine (Phaesolus caracola), marvel-of-Peru (Mirabilis jalapa), heliotrope/cherry pie (Heliotropum peruvianum).

The garden also contains plants from Africa. Cape Town, with its famous central garden established by the Dutch East India Company, was final port-of-call for most ships plying the Indian Ocean route from Britain to NSW. When the Second Fleet sopped at the Cape in April 1790, Elizabeth Macarthur (travelling with her husband John, later settlers at Elizabeth Farm) enthusiastically described the beauty of its flora. Plants from Africa became immensely popular in colonial NSW for their hardiness as well as their beauty. 'Cape bulbs'—a group of flowering plants including freesias, gladioli and ixias—were collected avidly. In 1841 William Charles Wentworth displayed Nerine undulate, a Cape bulb, at Sydney's Floral and Horticultural (Society's) show. African plants in the garden include bleeding heart vine (Clerodendron thompsonae), Nile/African lily (Agapanthus praecox), bird-of-paradise flower (Strelitzia reginae), giant honey flower (Melianthus major), geraniums (Pelargonium spp. / cv.s), kaffir lilies (Clivia miniata), Belladonna lilies (x Amaryllis/Amarygia belladonna), Cape plumbago (P.capensis) and Cape honeysuckle (Tecomaria capensis).

Plants from Asia, and especially China, have had some of the greatest impact on the character of Sydney gardens. At Vaucluse House a significant collection of 19th-century Camellia cultivars is the most obvious Chinese inheritance. China's horticultural treasures were largely unfamiliar to Western gardeners until the Treaty of Nanjing of 1842 opened official trade channels. Despite difficulties of access, well-connected NSW gardeners were able to introduce Chinese plants early - either from England or directly from trading ports of Canton (Guangzhou), where foreign merchants were permitted from the mid-18th century, and the Portuguese outpost of Macao. Chinese plants in the garden include shell ginger (Alpinia zerumbet), plume poppy, Macleaya cordata (named after Alexander Macleay, colonial secretary of New South Wales from the 1820s-30s, and gardener at Elizabeth Bay House), Camellia japonica cv.s, azaleas (Rhododendron indicum cv's), Cherokee rose (Rosa laevigata), Wisteria sinensis, (introduced into Sydney by Alexander Macleay at Elizabeth Bay) orange jessamine / sweet box (Murraya paniculata), confederate rose (Hibiscus mutabilis), butterfly bush (Buddleja davidii), fried egg plant (Gordonia axillaris) and "Safrano" rose, (R. 'Safrano').

Large shrubs in this shrubbery area include Cotoneaster sp. (China), Angel's trumpets (Brugmansia cv.s: S. & C. America)), bamboos (Arundinaria spp., Asia), lily-flowered magnolia (M.liliflora "Nigra", China), Viburnum odoratissimum (China), Camellia japonica cv.s (several, all double: China), autumn camellias (C.sasanqua cv.: China), butterfly bush (Buddleja davidii cv.s: China) and sage-leaved butterfly bush (B.salvifolia: S. Africa), Fuchsia microphylla, lasiandra (Tibouchina sp.: Brazil), Philodendron sp. (S. America), Paris daisy (Euryops pectinatus: S. Africa), Adam's needle/Spanish bayonet (Yucca gloriosa: Mexico), Tecoma stans (S. America) and more.

=== House complex ===
Vaucluse House is a large Gothic style residence built around a much smaller 1805 house* in stages until the 1860s. It has crenellated parapets, turrets and iron verandah posts. The verandah returns on three sides of the bay windowed front which has French windows with louvered shutters. The rear wings enclose a small courtyard, most windows being 12 pane type and doors of six panels. The roofs are slate and galvanised iron. Sir Henry Browne Hayes's Vaucluse Cottage still exists (vestibule, little tea room, east end of the dining room, stone walls within the drawing room, the c. 1828–30 little drawing room located on its former terrace), although completely engulfed by Wentworth's additions of c. 1828–30 and c. 1834–42. There is also a strong possibility that the Wentworth kitchen garden had been Hayes's. The interior contains much fine Georgian cedar joinery, marble chimney pieces and Pompeii tiles to the hall floor. The main complex comprises two connecting two storey and one three storey building which contain reception rooms, halls, guest bedrooms, family rooms and bedrooms, servants quarters and the service wing.

=== Outbuildings ===
Adjacent to the scullery are the dairy and larder. To the south is a building identified in 1853 as a store. The cottage layout suggests it was used originally as a house. A guardhouse is attached to, and post dates, the north-western corner of the courtyard wall. The laundry is immediately west of the house and creek. On the western side of the walled courtyard are a reservoir and pump associated with the water supply to the 1861–62 first floor bathroom, dressing room and water closet attached to the rear of the bedroom wing. The stable is a two-storey building with stalls, carriage and tack rooms and fruit storage areas. The tearoom is a single storey timber and tile building constructed this century with adjacent stone terrace.

=== Condition ===
As at 17 March 2015 the physical condition was good; and the archaeological potential was low to medium. Sir Henry Browne Hayes's Vaucluse Cottage still exists (vestibule, little tea room, east end of the dining room, stone walls within the drawing room, the c. 1828–30 little drawing room located on its former terrace), although completely engulfed by Wentworth's additions of c. 1828–30 and c. 1834–42. There is also a strong possibility that the Wentworth kitchen garden had been Hayes's.

The curtilage of Vaucluse House, as it exists today (1982), although still containing much of the original layout and essential qualities of an estate curtilage, has lost some important elements of the original. This has resulted from the erosion of the surrounding acreage, pressure from residential development (both visually and by the change of drainage patterns, etc.) and the methods of, and attitudes to grounds maintenance. The result is an enclosed suburban park rather than the curtilage of an estate residence. The house has a relative intactness of form, interior space and detailing predating 1900 such as the double water closet, wallpaper remnants and chimney pieces make the buildings an unusual survival of mid- to late 19th-century architecture, particularly G.

=== Modifications and dates ===
- 1803 – Cottage built by Browne.
- 180 – the Irish convict Sir Henry Browne Hayes purchased Laycock's grant and a grant adjacent to it. Hayes erected a small cottage, two huts and outbuildings, cleared 50 acres (20ha) for agricultural uses and planting several thousand fruit trees.
- 7 August 1827 – William Wentworth purchased the estate. Wentworth added adjacent lands, gained by grant and purchases up to a total of 515 acres (208ha), his estate stretching from the Macquarie Lighthouse on South Head to the eastern heights of Rose Bay. Wentworth carried out major building and ground works through 25 years of occupancy.
- 1828 – Major additions to the house, including turrets, a large kitchen wing and convict barracks. By the 1830s the Wentworth family had made many visible improvements, including turrets on the house, a sandstone stable in 1829 by architect George Cookney, a large kitchen wing and convict barracks. Vaucluse House and its furnishings were clearly intended to provide the correct social surroundings for Wentworth and his wife Sarah's immediate family of seven daughters and three sons. Sir Henry Browne Hayes' modest structure disappeared within the building fabric of the Wentworth's gothic mansion. The public areas were designed for effect and the Drawing and Dining Rooms, long hall and sweeping staircase was as fashionable as the Wentworth's taste would allow. Vaucluse House was never completed due to factors which included the 1840s depression and Wentworth's intentions for a full facade, bedroom additions and formal entrance are unknown.
- March 1853 – the family sold most of the contents of the house by auction and moved to Europe. In December the house and 163 acres within the fences was leased to John Hosking for three years, a lease agreement requiring him to keep "the park, gardens, orangeries, vineyard and buildings, fencing, hedges, ditches, gates, bridges, stiles, rails, poles, posts and drains in good and sufficient order". When the Wentworths returned briefly in 1861–62, many improvements were made to the pleasure grounds. The gothic revival iron verandah was built and fountain installed in the pleasure garden. Renovations were necessary after several years of relative neglect by tenants, and the present iron verandah with its Gothic Revival columns replaced an earlier flat roofed verandah. Use of the estate grounds extended to the harbour side Beach Paddock. The family introduced new plantings to the gardens and orchards and innovations in fencing shaped and formalised the approaches to the property.
- In 1900 – the contents of the house were auctioned, and the house remained unoccupied until 1911. Then some 28 acres (9ha) including house and garden, were resumed by the NSW Government for use as a public reserve. Providing for the current needs took precedence over preservation and the ruins of the convict barracks, workers cottages, fences and stock shed were demolished.
- 1910–20 – The Trust replaced the original gates with four sets of gates. The square pillars and iron gates of the original Vaucluse Estate entrance were removed from Vaucluse Road near Nielsen Park and resited near the original driveway at the intersection of Wentworth Road and Olola Avenue. The house, although virtually empty, was open on weekends and holidays.
- 1917 – two towers were added to the eastern facade and the crenellations continued across the front facade to give a semblance of completeness. The character of the garden changed in detail more than layout'
- 1920s – Changes to garden and carriage circle formalised with the removal of the Bunya Bunya Pine and construction of a grassed loop. By the mid 1920s almost all evidence of the Wentworth entry road had been lost and was replaced by Wentworth Road. Olola Avenue was built. Until this decade substantial areas of cleared land survived in the east and west.
- Mid 1920s – Kiosk, toilets, cottage and greenhouse (since demolished) built. The kiosk (now tearooms) was built, new concrete pedestrian bridges built over the creek, and the ground level around the western side of the stables was radically altered for footpaths. Original gravel paths were bitumenised, last remnants of the orchard and vineyard removed and the original entry drive disappeared. Wentworth's precious bushland to the west and east was subdivided.
- 1930s – Depression era - much relief work activity in the park. Concrete paths laid, stone walls contained the creek. Much work was done on the carriage loop including building stone walls, kerbing and arbors. An extensive rose garden was established in the central lawn. A rockery was formed around the bakery and the garden embellished with beds of azaleas, cannas, cinerarias and begonias—changing the 19th-century estate into a 20th-century municipal park.
- During the 20th century – a number of typically characteristic and dominant plants have been removed from the grounds, the most important of these being:
  - two Araucaria pines (in the front park and along Olola Avenue);
  - a fig tree in the front park;
  - two Magnolias to the west of the residence;
  - willows (Salix sp.) along the creek.
- 1940s – Walled enclosure around store and west of kitchen built. Further additions and alterations were made in the period up until 1966.
- 1966 – Wisteria removed from over the front verandah and replaced with hardier variety. Gardens formalised.
- 1996 – large Moreton Bay fig between house and tea rooms was removed due to branch drop and poor condition. Cuttings from a branch were propagated and a new tree has been put back to replace it.
- 2000 – kitchen garden re-created west of the creek, based on 19th-century documentary and garden practise research, in an area adjacent to the wash house, across from the service courtyard of the house, and a small part of the original grid of orchards, vegetable plots and vineyard (since lost to carpark and lawns in north-western corner of current estate).

== Heritage listing ==
As at 31 May 2000, Vaucluse House was one of the few 19th-century houses on Sydney Harbour retaining a significant part of its original estate setting. One distinguishing surviving characteristic of the 19th-century estate is its careful division into specific areas, both functional and ornamental, such as pleasure garden, kitchen garden, rear service yard, paddocks, carriageway, creek, estate backdrop, beach paddock.

Vaucluse House is significant because of its association with the Wentworth family and their aspirations. It has a large collection of surviving original documentary evidence relating to the house, its contents and occupants. There are a number of extant buildings and gardens and the house retains relative intactness of form, interior space and detailing predating 1900. A large early Victorian garden and shrubbery, laid out to compliment a gothic revival house belonging to the family of the important colonial pioneer and politician W. C. Wentworth. There appears little early documentation of the garden but it can be presumed to have been designed to complement the mid-19th-century additions to the house and to have been established by the 1860s. Vaucluse House was listed on the New South Wales State Heritage Register on 2 April 1999 having satisfied the following criteria.

The place is important in demonstrating the course, or pattern, of cultural or natural history in New South Wales.

Vaucluse House was the family home of William Charles and Sarah Wentworth and their family, mainly from 1827 to 1853, and as such reflects the aspirations of a prominent political figure in mid-19th-century NSW. It was during this period that Wentworth was arguably at his most prominent and influential in Australian society. It is Australia's first "House Museum", an important example of rare and forward thinking, public "preservation" and recreational planning of the early 20th century. With its family-provenanced collection, it demonstrates the way of life of the Wentworths, their taste incorporated with the taste of their time, social standing and status. The property, but particularly the house, reflects a statement of where the Wentworths aspired to be, as opposed to where they were placed because of their family history (perception of Sarah and William Charles Wentworth's family convict origins by Sydney society). Extant buildings offer both "master and servant' perspectives on mid-19th-century life. The financial effects of the 1849s depression in Australia are apparent through the incompleteness of the building. The building is an example of English Gothic Romanticism in Australia and reflects the aspirations of the Wentworths in asserting their social status. The Vaucluse Site is significant because it is an example of a designed "Picturesque" landscape, including fountain and shrubbery, of the colonial period belonging to a prominent colonial family; it contains remnants and features of a "gardened site" begun in 1804 and shows the development of gardening styles, taste and necessity over fifty years; and it has strong association with the Wentworth family such as the Mausoleum and Greycliffe House.

The place is important in demonstrating aesthetic characteristics and/or a high degree of creative or technical achievement in New South Wales.

The Vaucluse Site is significant because it provides the opportunity to demonstrate the architectural and functional interdependence of house, estate buildings and landscape setting in a colonial rural estate and therefore enables an understanding of the social and cultural values of the owners and their period. It provides an appropriately scaled setting for an important historic house.

The place has a strong or special association with a particular community or cultural group in New South Wales for social, cultural or spiritual reasons.

The Vaucluse Site is significant because the grounds, including the Beach Paddock, Tearooms and South Paddock stairs have provided a significant community recreational facility developed by Trustees for local residents and visitors since 1910. The grounds have provided work for the local community since the early 19th century and reflected major social changes such as the 1930s depression. It provides extensive free access to the waterfront.

The place has potential to yield information that will contribute to an understanding of the cultural or natural history of New South Wales.

The house is significant because of the large surviving collection of original documentary evidence pertaining to the house, its occupants and the existence of provenanced objects. The Vaucluse Site is significant because: The garden contains remnants of some native plantings now established, such as a c. 1950 Norfolk Island Hibiscus and a c. 1859 Port jackson Fig. The Olola Avenue perimeter retains remnants of the indigenous vegetation.

The place possesses uncommon, rare or endangered aspects of the cultural or natural history of New South Wales.

The house is a rare example of a 19th-century marine villa with some extant buildings. The garden is a rare extant example of a garden belonging to a 19th-century mansion adjacent to the harbour which has not been entirely subdivided and which substantial

== See also ==
- Gothic Revival architecture
- Historic Houses Trust of New South Wales
- List of historic homesteads in Australia
- Wentworth Mausoleum
