= Hinchinbrook, Queensland =

Hinchinbrook
- Suburb
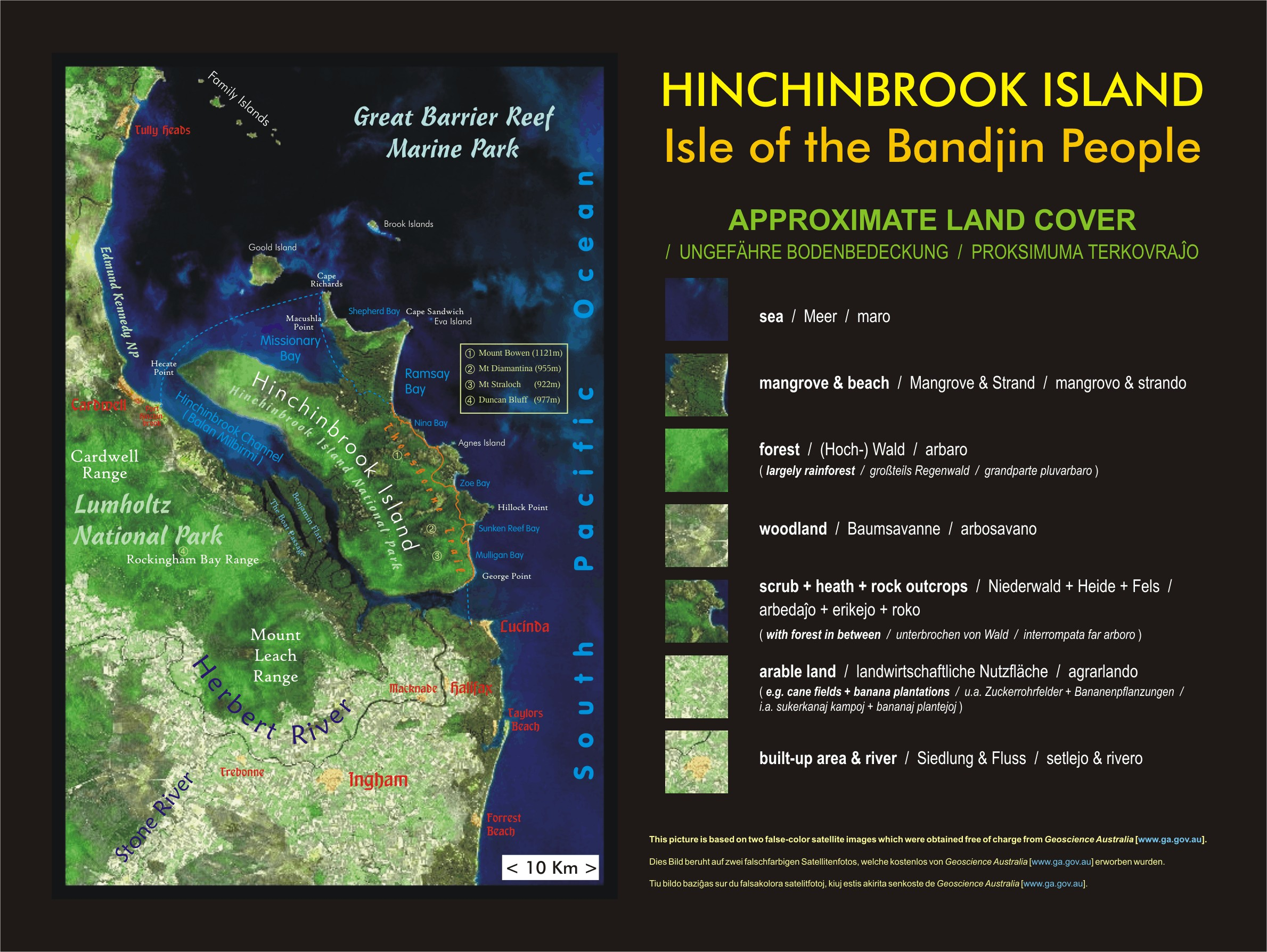
- Islands within the locality of Hinchinbrook

- Interactive map of Hinchinbrook
- Coordinates: 18.3125°S 146.2180°E
- Country: Australia
- State: Queensland
- LGA: Cassowary Coast Region

Government
  - State electorate: Hinchinbrook
  - Federal division: Kennedy

Area
  - Total: 1,198.0 km^{2} (462.6 sq mi)

Population
  - Total: 5 (2021 census)
  - Density: 0.0042/km^{2} (0.0108/sq mi)
- Postcode: 4849
Suburbs around Hinchinbrook
Kennedy; Ellerbeck	Coral Sea	Coral Sea
Cardwell; Damper Creek	Hinchinbrook	Coral Sea
Rungoo	Macknade; Lucinda	Coral Sea

Hinchinbrook is an island group locality in the Cassowary Coast Region, Queensland, Australia. In the 2021 census, Hinchinbrook had a population of 5 people.

== Geography ==
The locality consists of a number of islands off the Queensland coast. The largest is Hinchinbrook Island while the others are very small in comparison. To the north of Hinchinbrook Island are Garden Island, Goold Island, and the Brook Islands (North Island, Tween Island, Middle Island and South Island). To the east of Hinchinbrook Island are Eva Island and Agnes Island. To the west of Hinchinbrook Island in the Hinchinbrook Channel (which separates the island from the mainland) is a group of low-lying islands called the Benjamin Flats and Haycock Island.

Much of the locality is protected from development including the Hinchinbrook Island National Park (covering the whole of Hinchinbrook Island, Eva Island, Agnes Island and Haycock Island), Goold Island National Park (covering all of Goold Island) and Brook Islands National Park (including North Island, Tween Island and Middle Island, but not South Island).

Hinchinbrook Island is quite mountainous with several peaks, the highest ones being Barra Castle Hill (1,910 m, 6,266 ft), Mount Bowen (1,121 m, 3,678 ft), The Thumb (981 m, 3,219 ft), Mount Diamantina (953 m, 3,127 ft) and Mount Straloch (922 m, 3,025 ft).

== History ==
The locality was named after Hinchinbrook Island, which in turn was named on 19 May 1819 by hydrographer Lieutenant Phillip Parker King on HMS Mermaid.

== Demographics ==
In the 2016 census, Hinchinbrook had "no people or a very low population".

In the 2021 census, Hinchinbrook had a population of 5 people.

== Education ==
There are no schools on the islands. The alternatives are distance education and boarding school.

== Attractions ==
Benjamin Flats are a sheltered area good for fishing for barramundi, fingermark bream, black jewfish, and big golden grunter.
