= Pimelea plurinervia =

Scientific classification
- Kingdom: Plantae
- Clade: Tracheophytes
- Clade: Angiosperms
- Clade: Eudicots
- Clade: Rosids
- Order: Malvales
- Family: Thymelaeaceae
- Genus: Pimelea
- Species: P. plurinervia

Binomial name
- Pimelea plurinervia A.R.Bean

Species of shrub

Pimelea plurinervia is a species of flowering plant in the family Thymelaeaceae and is endemic to north-eastern Queensland. It is a shrub with densely hairy young stems, elliptic leaves and heads of 24 to 45 white, tube-shaped flowers.

== Description ==
Pimelea plurinervia is a shrub that typically grows to a height of 0.5–1 m (1 ft 8 in – 3 ft 3 in) and has hairy young stems. The leaves are arranged alternately along the branches, elliptic, lance-shaped of egg-shaped with the narrower end towards the base, 21–58 mm (0.83–2.28 in) long and 6.5–14 mm (0.26–0.55 in) wide, on a petiole 1.5–2.8 mm (0.059–0.110 in) long. The upper surface of the leaves is sometimes hairy, the lower surface with hairs pressed against the surface. The flowers are borne on the ends of branches in heads of 8 to 18 on a densely hairy rachis 2–4 mm (0.079–0.157 in) long, each flower on a pedicel 0.8–1.3 mm (0.031–0.051 in) long. The flowers are sometimes female, the floral tube 4.5–8.8 mm (0.18–0.35 in) long and white, the sepals 1.6–3.7 mm (0.063–0.146 in) long and spread widely apart. Flowering occurs from August to February, and the seeds are oval, black and 3.0–4.1 mm (0.12–0.16 in) long.

== Taxonomy ==
Pimelea plurinervia was first formally described in 2017 by Anthony Bean in the journal Austrobaileya from specimens he collected in Hinchinbrook Island National Park in 1991. The specific epithet (plurinervia) means "many veins", referring to the veins on the leaves.

== Distribution and habitat ==
This pimelea grows in wet forest and on the edges of rainforest on Hinchinbrook Island and nearby mainland areas, and near Tully Falls south of Ravenshoe.
