= Hinchinbrook Island National Park =

National park in Queensland, Australia

- IUCN category II (national park)
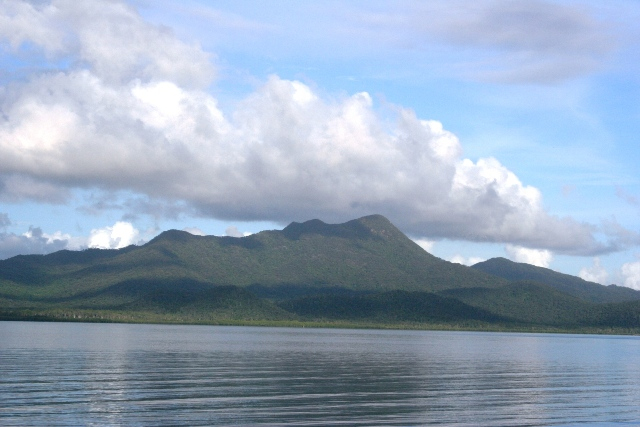
- Hinchinbrook Island, 2006

- Location within Queensland
- Location: Queensland
- Nearest city: Cardwell
- Coordinates: 18°22′55″S 146°14′49″E
- Area: 399 km^{2} (154 sq mi)
- Established: 1932
- Governing body: Queensland Parks and Wildlife Service
- Website: Official website

Hinchinbrook Island National Park is Australia's largest island national park. It is situated along the Cassowary Coast in Queensland, Australia, with the state capital of Brisbane approximately 1,240 km to the south. Lucinda is 135 km or approximately 1.5 hours' drive north of Townsville, being the closest North Queensland provincial city. Cairns, a Far North Queensland provincial city, is 2.5–3 hours' drive north of Cardwell. The main geographical features in the park are the rugged Hinchinbrook Island, including Mount Bowen (1,121 m; 3,678 ft), The Thumb (981 m; 3,219 ft), Mount Diamantina (953 m; 3,127 ft) and Mount Straloch (922 m; 3,025 ft).

The park contains the Thorsborne Trail for hikers. Also within the park lies the ruined Hinchinbrook Island Wilderness Lodge. The resort closed in 2010 due to the Great Recession and was destroyed by Cyclone Yasi shortly after. The buildings have been ransacked by looters and vandals. The developer has gone broke and there is no airport, making access a problem for any future developer.

== Situation ==
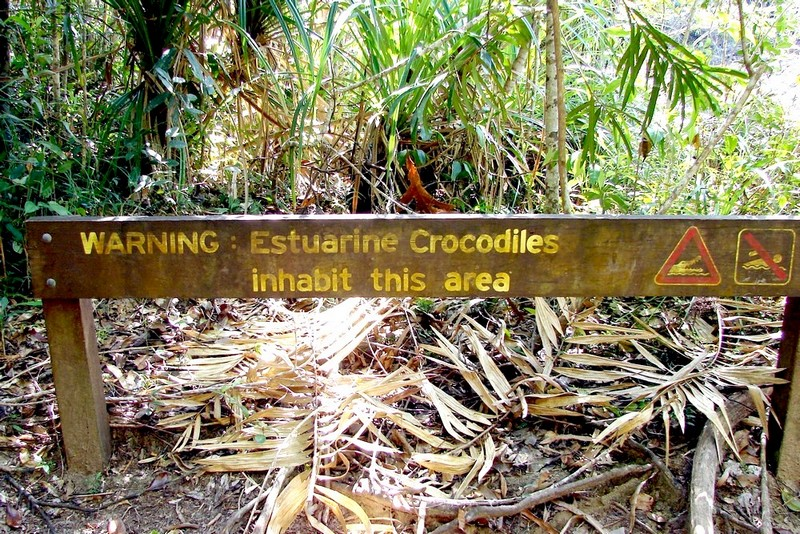
Crocodile warning sign

Hinchinbrook Island National Park includes 393 km^{2} area of Hinchinbrook Island. The continental island has a mountainous interior providing diverse refuges for endemic and endangered species, such as the dugong and the green sea turtle.

== Other conservation parks nearby ==
Other nearby continental islands which are part of the Great Barrier Reef Marine Park are Goold Island National Park, Brook Islands National Park and Family Islands National Park.

== See also ==
- Protected areas of Queensland
