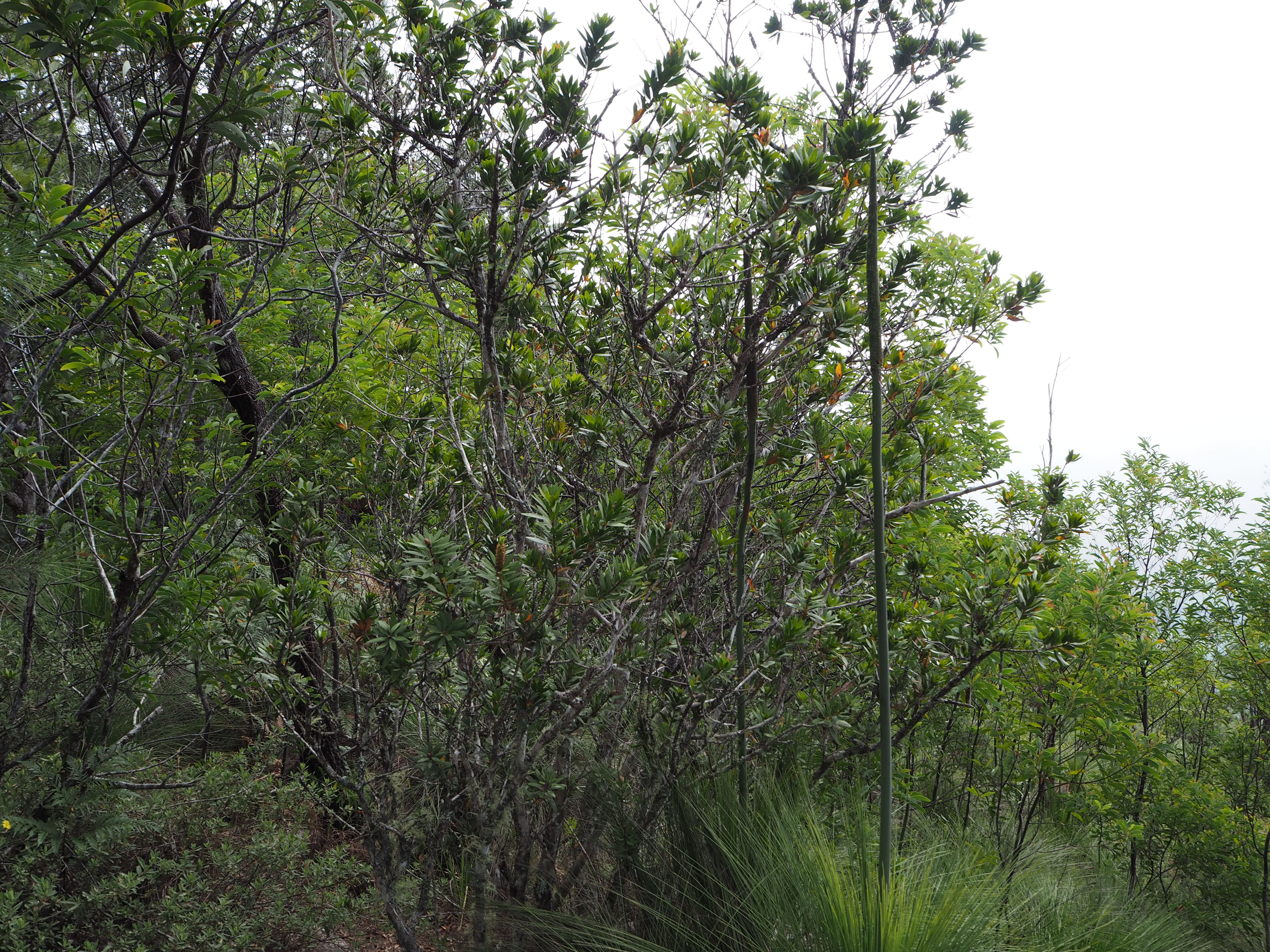
- On Walshs Pyramid

Scientific classification
- Kingdom: Plantae
- Clade: Embryophytes
- Clade: Tracheophytes
- Clade: Spermatophytes
- Clade: Angiosperms
- Clade: Eudicots
- Clade: Rosids
- Order: Myrtales
- Family: Myrtaceae
- Genus: Melaleuca
- Species: M. pyramidalis

Binomial name
- Melaleuca pyramidalis Craven

Synonyms
- Callistemon pyramidalis (Craven) Udovicic & R.D.Spencer

= Melaleuca pyramidalis =

Species of flowering plant

Melaleuca pyramidalis is a plant in the myrtle family, Myrtaceae and is endemic to small areas of Queensland in Australia. (Some Australian state herbaria use the name Callistemon pyramidalis.) It is closely related to Melaleuca citrina (Callistemon citrinus) but is distinguished from it mainly by leaf and stamen differences. Melaleuca pyramidalis is only known from the summits of three mountains in Queensland.

== Description ==
Melaleuca pyramidalis is a shrub growing to 3.5 m (10 ft) tall with compact, dark grey, papery bark. Its leaves are arranged alternately and are 29–84 mm (1–3 in) long, 8–24 mm (0.31–0.94 in) wide, flat, elliptical in shape with a short stalk. The veins are pinnate and there are only a few scattered, indistinct oil glands.

The flowers are red to pink, arranged in spikes up to 60 mm (2 in) in diameter with 20 to 50 individual flowers. The petals are 2.8–6.3 mm (0.1–0.2 in) long and fall off as the flower ages and there are 35 to 42 stamens in each flower. Flowering occurs in late winter and is followed by fruit that are woody capsules, 3.8–5 mm (0.1–0.2 in) long in loose clusters along the stem.

M. pyramidalis can be distinguished from the similar M. citrina by its obscure oil glands (prominent in M. citrina) and yellow stamen tips (dark red in M.citrina).

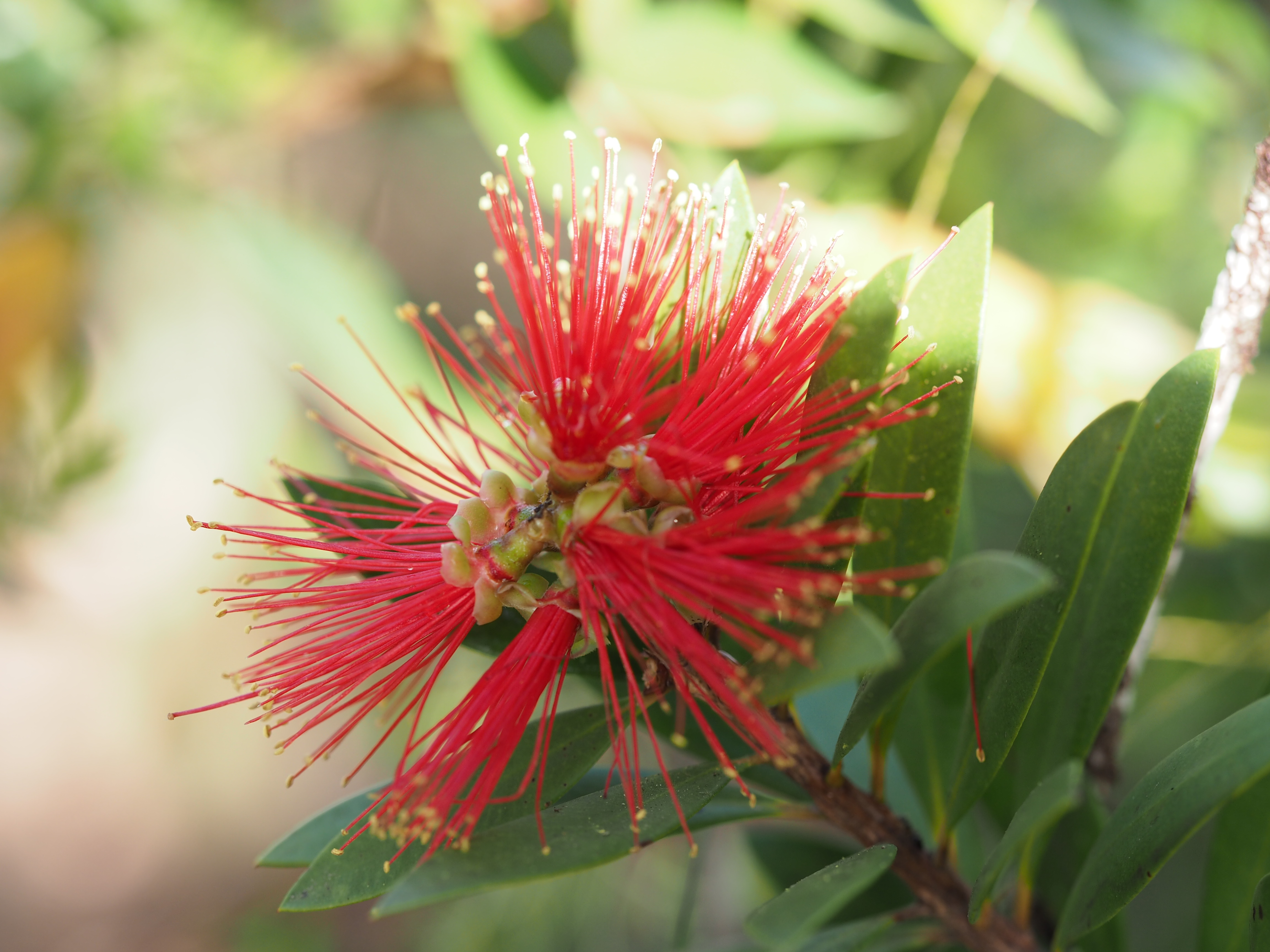
Early flowers

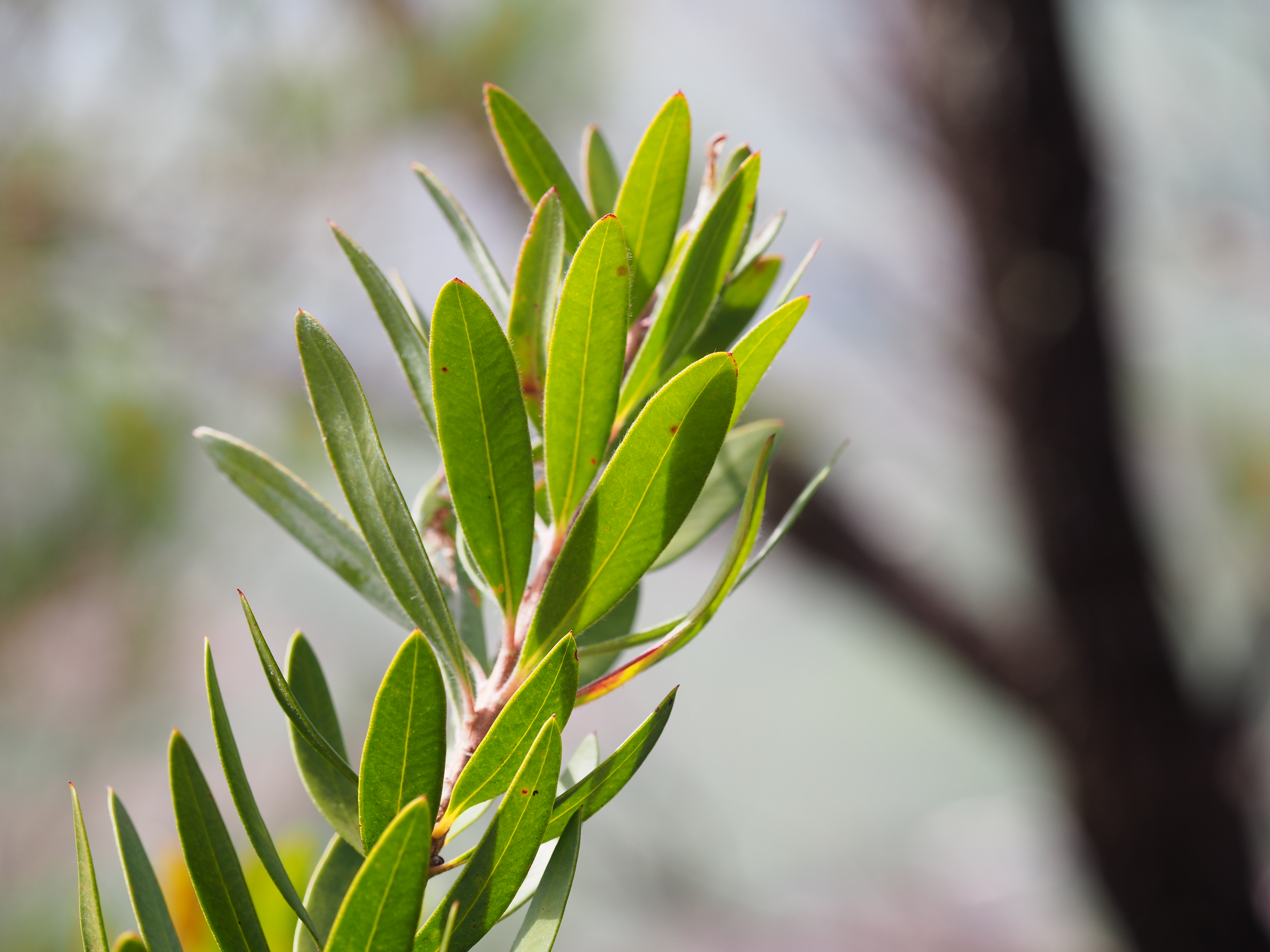
Foliage

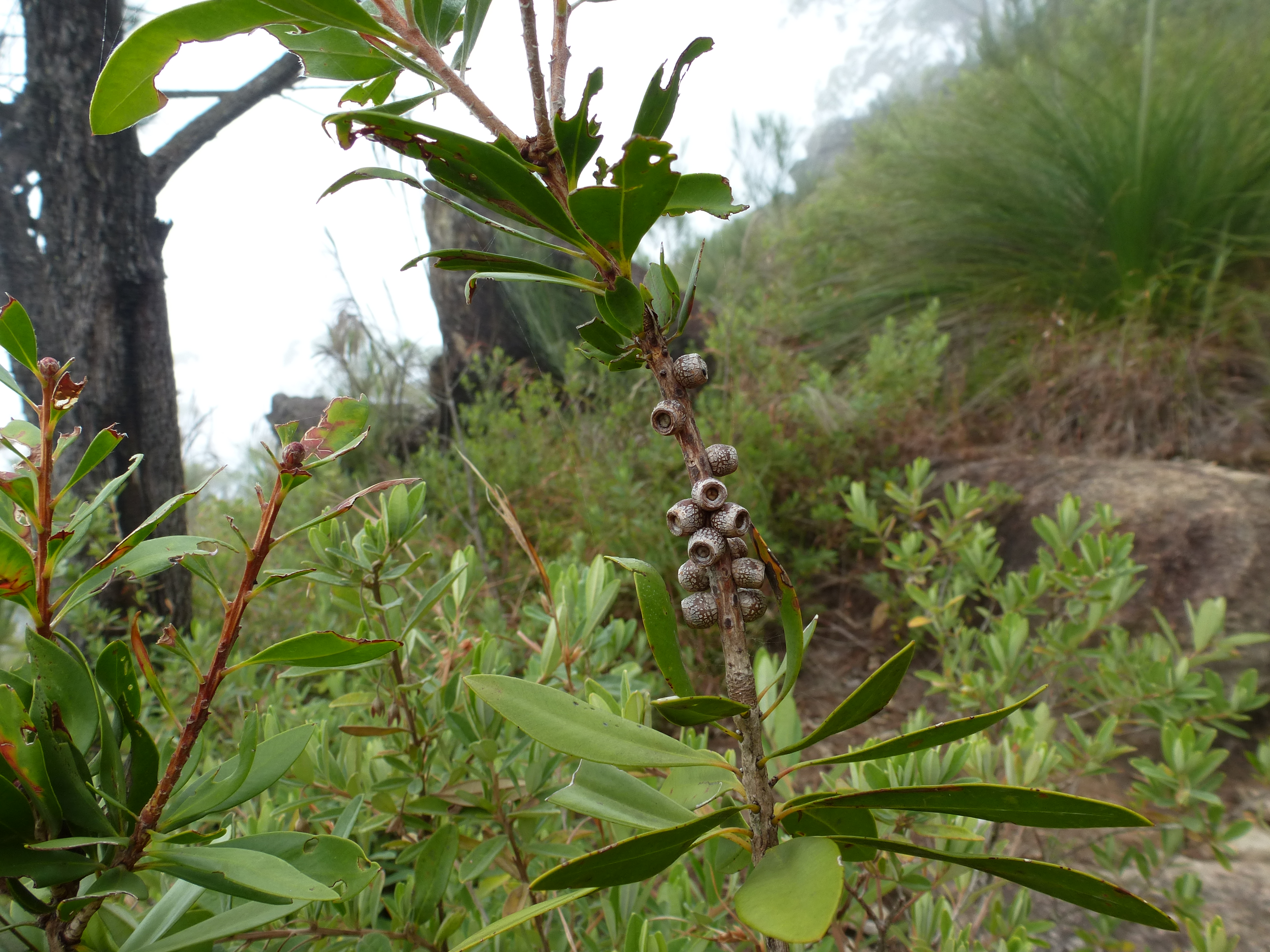
Fruit

== Taxonomy and naming ==
Melaleuca pyramidalis was first formally described in 2009 by Lyndley Craven in Novon from a specimen collected at the summit of Walshs Pyramid near Gordonvale. In 2012, Udovicic and Spencer gave the species the name Callistemon pyramidalis but in 2013, Craven transferred all species previously known as Callistemon to Melaleuca. Some authorities continue to use Callistemon pyramidalis. The specific epithet (pyramidalis) refers to Walshs Pyramid where the type specimen was collected.

Callistemon pyramidalis is regarded as a synonym of Melaleuca pyramidalis by the Plants of the World Online.

== Distribution and habitat ==
Melaleuca pyramidalis occurs on the summits of Walshs Pyramid, Mount Diamantina (on Hinchinbrook Island) and Mount Leach (near Ingham). It grows mostly in open forest on rocky hilltops.

== Conservation ==
The IUCN Red List classification of vulnerable applies to Melaleuca pyramidalis because it is only known from a few sites.
