= Warren Macdonald =

Australian environmentalist, explorer and mountain climber (born 1965)

Warren Macdonald (born 1965) is an Australian environmentalist, explorer, mountain climber, motivational speaker, and writer.

Macdonald was born in Melbourne. In April 1997 he was climbing Mount Bowen on Hinchinbrook Island when a giant boulder fell on his legs. Warren survived the accident thanks to Geert van Keulen, a Dutch traveller Warren had met the day before, who raced down the mountain for help after being unable to lift the boulder off Macdonald's legs; hydraulic lifting equipment was needed to free Macdonald. He spent two days out in the open and both his legs were amputated at the thigh.

Ten months later, Warren climbed Tasmania's Cradle Mountain using a modified wheelchair and the seat of his pants. A year later he climbed Federation Peak. In February 2003 he became the first double–above knee amputee to reach the summit of Mount Kilimanjaro in Tanzania, Africa's tallest peak, while using specialty climbing prostheses developed by Hanger prosthetists Kevin Carroll and Chad Simpson. More recently Warren climbed El Capitan in the U.S. Sierra Nevada and the Weeping Wall in Alberta, Canada.

Macdonald has written a book called A Test of Will. He told the story of the accident on Discovery Channel's programme I Shouldn't Be Alive. The episode is titled "Trapped Under a Boulder".

Macdonald has lived in Vancouver and in Australia. Warren currently lives in Fairmont BC.
