= Dolphin Tale =

2011 film by Charles Martin Smith

- Theatrical release poster
- Directed by: Charles Martin Smith
- Written by: Karen Janszen; Noam Dromi
- Produced by: Richard Ingber; Broderick Johnson; Andrew A. Kosove
- Starring: Harry Connick Jr.; Ashley Judd; Nathan Gamble; Kris Kristofferson; Cozi Zuehlsdorff; Morgan Freeman
- Cinematography: Karl Walter Lindenlaub
- Edited by: Harvey Rosenstock
- Music by: Mark Isham
- Production company: Alcon Entertainment
- Distributed by: Warner Bros. Pictures
- Release date: September 23, 2011 (United States)
- Running time: 113 minutes
- Country: United States
- Language: English
- Budget: $37 million
- Box office: $95.9 million

Dolphin Tale is a 2011 American family drama film directed by Charles Martin Smith and written by Karen Janszen and Noam Dromi. It stars Harry Connick Jr., Ashley Judd, Nathan Gamble, Kris Kristofferson, Cozi Zuehlsdorff in her film debut, and Morgan Freeman. The book and film are inspired by the true story of Winter, a bottlenose dolphin that was rescued in December 2005 off the Florida coast and taken in by the Clearwater Marine Aquarium. In the film, Winter loses her tail after becoming entangled with a rope attached to a crab trap, and must be fitted with a prosthetic one in order to swim naturally again.

The film was released on September 23, 2011, by Warner Bros. Pictures; Dolphin Tale received positive reviews from critics and earned $95.9 million on a $37 million budget. A sequel, Dolphin Tale 2, was released on September 12, 2014.

== Plot ==
Sawyer Nelson is a lonely 11-year-old who has been falling behind academically in school since his father's abandonment five years earlier. Sawyer spends his time playing video games and building model airplanes and helicopters in his garage. His only friend is his college-aged cousin Kyle Connellan, a champion swimmer who hopes to compete in the Olympics. Kyle leaves to spend time in the army, to help pay for Olympic training. With his only friend gone, Sawyer becomes even more isolated and Sawyer's failing grades have required him to take summer school.

One day, while riding his bike to summer school, Sawyer finds a fisherman attempting to help an injured dolphin tangled in a crab trap. The dolphin is taken for treatment to Clearwater Marine Hospital (CMH), run by Dr. Clay Haskett. Clay's daughter Hazel names the dolphin Winter, after two prior dolphins, Summer and Autumn, had been treated successfully and returned to the ocean. Sawyer sneaks in to see Winter, and later starts to visit each day, being harassed by a crazy pelican named Rufus. Sawyer's mother, Lorraine, and Clay are hesitant, due to Sawyer's inexperience with marine animals, and repeatedly skipping summer school, but they realize that the friendship seems to benefit both Winter and Sawyer. Clay allows the visits to continue, and Lorraine withdraws Sawyer from summer school and lets him volunteer at CMA, and gives him a new wetsuit.

However, Winter's tail is wounded and must be amputated. Winter learns to swim without a tail by developing a side-to-side motion like a fish, but after an X-ray, Clay notices the unnatural motion is causing stress on her spine, which, if continued, will handicap and eventually kill her.

The news comes that Kyle has been injured severely in an explosion and is returning home for treatment. Sawyer is excited to see him, but devastated when Kyle skips his own welcoming party and stays at the local Department of Veterans Affairs Medical Center, where Dr. Cameron McCarthy develops prosthetic limbs. Sawyer and his mother visit Kyle there, but Sawyer is insulted when Kyle asks them to leave. Not wanting to upset Sawyer, Kyle takes Sawyer for a walk and explains his situation and that he needs some time. At Sawyer's request, McCarthy agrees to make a prosthetic tail for Winter and convinces his prosthetic supplier Hanger Prosthetics and Orthotics to supply the parts at no cost. McCarthy manufactures a "homemade" model tail while waiting for the real one to arrive, but Winter rejects it by banging it against the pool wall. Meanwhile, Kyle gets more depressed when his friend and swimming partner, Donovan Peck, beats his old swimming records. McCarthy persuades Kyle to go home.

Faced with financial trouble, the CMA is heavily damaged by a hurricane. The board of directors agrees to close up and sell the land to a real estate developer. It finds homes for all the animals except Winter, who is not wanted due to her disability and may have to be euthanized. Kyle visits CMA and sees that Winter is like him, with a damaged limb. Inspired by a girl with a prosthetic limb whose mother drives her eight hours from Atlanta to visit Winter, Sawyer imagines holding a "Save Winter Day" to save the facility. Clay is at first unconvinced, but he reconsiders after talking with his father, Reed. Kyle agrees to race Donovan and persuades Bay News 9 to cover the event.

The Hanger-supplied tail finally arrives; however, Winter refuses it as well. Sawyer then realizes what the real problem is: the plastic base for the tail is irritating her skin. McCarthy develops an alternative gel-like sock which he calls "Winter's Gel" (which is the real name of the Hanger product used to attach prosthetic limbs, developed during research with Winter) and Winter accepts this new prosthetic tail.

At Save Winter Day, the work with Winter impresses everyone. Sawyer's teacher gives him school credit, allowing him to pass summer school. The fisherman who found Winter on the beach comes, too. Kyle and Donovan race, but there is no clear winner as it turns into a race for fun after Winter and many children get in the water. The real estate developer decides to keep CMA open and to support it financially.

The ending shows documentary footage from Winter's actual rescue, several of the prosthetic tails that Winter has worn, and scenes of real amputees visiting Winter at the Clearwater Marine Aquarium.

== Cast ==
- Nathan Gamble as Sawyer Nelson, a shy and lonely 11-year-old boy who finds Winter and cuts the crab trap off her. He becomes a friend and paternal figure of sorts to Winter.
- Winter as herself, an injured bottlenose dolphin that must have part of her fluke amputated. Despite that, she adapts and swims side-to-side, but that turns out to be bad for Winter's spine, so the prosthetic fin which allows her to swim naturally is developed.
- Harry Connick Jr. as Dr. Clay Haskett, the operator of the Clearwater Marine Aquarium in Clearwater, Hazel's widowed father and Reed's son.
- Ashley Judd as Lorraine Nelson, Sawyer's divorced mother and a nurse.
- Kris Kristofferson as Reed Haskett, Clay's father and Hazel's grandfather.
- Morgan Freeman as Dr. Cameron McCarthy, a prosthetic designer and Kyle's doctor at the VA Hospital. He agrees to help create a prosthetic tail for Winter.
- Kim Ostrenko as Alyce Connellan, Kyle's mother, Sawyer's aunt, and Lorraine's sister.
- Jim Fitzpatrick as Max Connellan, Kyle's father and Sawyer's uncle. He is also an army veteran.
- Cozi Zuehlsdorff as Hazel Haskett, an 11-year-old girl and the daughter of Clay and granddaughter of Reed. She helps out in the aquarium and becomes friends with Sawyer.
- Ray McKinnon as Mr. Doyle, Sawyer's teacher.
- Austin Stowell as Kyle Connellan, Sawyer's cousin, who is a state swimming champion. At the start of the movie, he leaves to spend time in the army to get money to participate in the Olympics, but is injured and comes home prematurely.
- Frances Sternhagen as Gloria Forrest, the owner of Clearwater Marine Aquarium.
- Austin Highsmith as Phoebe, the trainer of Clearwater Marine Aquarium.
- Juliana Harkavy as Rebecca, the marine veterinarian of Clearwater Marine Aquarium.
- Richard Libertini as the fisherman who finds Winter. He later visits during the fundraiser and gives them a generous donation. (Libertini's final film role before his death in 2016.)
- Tom Nowicki as Phillip J. Hordern, a real estate developer.

== Differences between the movie and real-life events ==
In the film, Winter is stranded on Honeymoon Island Beach in Dunedin near Clearwater. She is found lying on the shore by a nearby fisherman and rescued with Sawyer's assistance. In real life, Winter was found in Mosquito Lagoon south of New Smyrna Beach―part of the Cape Canaveral National Seashore. The fisherman who discovered her was in the lagoon, as well. Hubbs-SeaWorld Research Institute Research and stranding team responded to the reported animal, researcher Teresa Mazza-Jablonski stayed with Winter in the water for 7 hours. Winter was first taken to the local Marine Discovery center and then transferred to Clearwater, which is on the opposite side of the state.

In the movie, Winter's tail was amputated due to infection caused from being caught in the rope. In real life, the loss of blood supply to the tail (from being caught in the rope) caused most of the tail to fall off, with only a small piece being amputated.

In the movie, developing Winter's tail takes a few weeks, with a Veteran's Administration doctor working during his vacation. In real life, the process of developing a suitable tail took several months' work by Kevin Carroll and Dan Strzempka and Charles Brown from Hanger Clinic.

== Production ==
In December 2009, Alcon Entertainment approached Charles Martin Smith to write and direct a film based on Winter's life. In August 2010, Morgan Freeman, Harry Connick Jr. and Ashley Judd joined the cast. In October 2010, Kris Kristofferson also joined the cast.

Dolphin Tale was filmed in native 3D, beginning in September 2010. It was shot primarily in Pinellas County, Florida, with the principal location being the Clearwater Marine Aquarium. Additional locations featured include: Admiral Farragut Academy, The Long Center, Honeymoon Island, Tarpon Springs, and local news station Bay News 9. Justin Sherbert (stage name: Justin Sherman) of Free Willy fame was initially contacted to train the marine mammal extras, but declined.

== Soundtrack ==
=== Soundtrack list ===
- "World Gone Crazy" – performed by The Doobie Brothers
- "Knee Deep" – performed by Zac Brown Band featuring Jimmy Buffett
- "Sh-Boom" – performed by The Chords
- "Everything Happens to Me" – written by Tom Adair and Matt Dennis
- "Ride of the Valkyries" – performed by the Budapest Symphony Orchestra
- "I'm Yours" – written and performed by Jason Mraz
- "Line Dance" – written and performed by Michael Wells and David Fowler
- "Second Guessin'" – written and performed by Jerry King and the Rivertown Ramblers
- "Kings Road A "- written by Jens Funke and Josef Peters
- "Made for Dancing" – performed by Ron Keel
- "Safe" – performed by Westlife

== Release ==
Dolphin Tale was released on September 23, 2011, in North America by Warner Bros. Pictures and Alcon Entertainment, in RealD 3D and 2D. It opened at number three with $19.2 million behind the 3D re-release of The Lion King and Moneyball. In its second weekend, the film reached the number-one spot, dropping only 27%, and grossed $13.9 million. As of January 5, 2012, the film has grossed $72,286,779 in the United States and Canada, as well as $23,117,618 internationally, bringing its worldwide total to $95,404,397. The film was released on DVD and Blu-ray, with the inclusion of the Arc Productions short "Ormie and the Cookie Jar" (2009), and was available at iTunes Store and Google Play Store on December 20, 2011.

== Reception ==
On Rotten Tomatoes 81% of 111 critics gave the film a positive review, with an average rating of 6.5/10. The website's critical consensus reads, "Wisely dialing down the schmaltz, Dolphin Tale is earnest, sweet, and well-told, a rare family film that both kids and parents can enjoy." Metacritic, which assigns a weighted average score out of 100 to reviews from mainstream critics, gives the film a score of 64 based on 31 reviews, indicating "generally favorable" reviews. Audiences polled by CinemaScore gave the film a rare "A+" on an A+ to F scale.

=== Awards ===
Award	Category	Recipient(s)	Result	Ref.
Young Artist Award	Best Performance in a Feature Film – Leading Young Actor	Nathan Gamble	Nominated	
Young Artist Award	Best Performance in a Feature Film – Supporting Young Actress	Cozi Zuehlsdorff	Nominated	

== Sequel ==
A sequel titled Dolphin Tale 2 was released on September 12, 2014.
