= Kevin Carroll (prosthetist) =

Irish prosthetist

Kevin Carroll is an Irish prosthetist, researcher, educator, and author. He is the vice-president of Prosthetics for Hanger Clinic, a prosthetics and orthotics provider in the United States.

Kevin travels around the United States and the world providing care for patients with unique or challenging cases and for disabled athletes. He also presents scientific symposiums and educational programs.

Carroll is one of the most renowned prosthetists in the world. He is an American Board Certified Prosthetist and has been named a Fellow of the American Academy of Orthotists and Prosthetists. He is a member of the International Society for Prosthetics and Orthotics (ISPO), the British Association of Prosthetics and Orthotics (BAPO) and the National Association of Professional Geriatric Care Managers. In 2009 Carroll was awarded the Distinguished Service Award by the United States Sports Academy because of his contributions to the advancement of prosthetics and his dedication to numerous disabled and Paralympic athletes.

== Winter the dolphin ==
In 2005, a two-month-old baby dolphin (later named Winter) became entangled in the ropes of a crab trap and was brought to Clearwater Marine Aquarium for rehabilitation. Since the rope cut off the supply of blood to her tail, her tail slowly self-amputated.

It was thought that Winter would learn to swim without a tail, but this forced her to swim with a "side to side" motion instead of the normal "up and down" motion. Winter's veterinarians feared that this unusual movement would damage her spine. Kevin Carroll, who had previously designed prosthetics for other animals (including dogs, an ostrich and a duck), volunteered to help after hearing about Winter on NPR and became Winter's prosthetist in 2005.

Kevin and a team of experts, including Hanger clinician Dan Strzempka, began working on creating a prosthetic tail for Winter. While Carroll thought that it would be a simple task, the project took over a year and a half before the tail was ready for Winter to wear. The successful creation of an artificial tail fluke is the first time a full prosthetic tail has been created for a dolphin.

Carroll and Strzempka worked with a chemical engineer to develop WintersGel, a new material that would disperse pressure evenly onto the dolphin's skin. Now the material is used for human amputees including Brian Kolfage and Megan McKeon.

=== 2009 book ===
In 2009 Winter's story was told by Craig Hatkoff and his daughters Juliana and Isabella Hatkoff, the No. 1 New York Times best-selling children's authors in Winter's Tail: How One Little Dolphin Learned to Swim Again. The book was published by Turtle Pond Publications and Scholastic. The book was co-released with a Nintendo DS game.

=== 2011 film ===
In 2011, Winter's story hit the big screen when American film director Charles Martin Smith directed the film Dolphin Tale. Carroll and Strzempka served as consultants for the movie and are featured at the end credits along with Megan McKeon and others who have benefited from Winter. For reasons unknown concerning the historical liberties, Carroll and Strzempka's roles were merged into one character for the film, Dr. Cameron McCarthy who is played by actor Morgan Freeman. On the Blu-ray + DVD + UltraViolet Digital Copy version of the movie, Carroll and Strzempka are featured in Winter's Inspiration, the featurette that shares Winter's true story.

== Warren Macdonald ==
In 1997 Warren Macdonald, an Australian mountain climber, was climbing through a remote mountainside in Australia when a one-ton boulder fell onto his legs trapping him for 45 hours. This trauma resulted in both of his legs being amputated mid-thigh. After his rehabilitation, he returned to climbing using speciality climbing prostheses developed by Kevin Carroll and Hanger clinician Chad Simpson. In 2003 Macdonald climbed to the top of Mount Kilimanjaro in Tanzania, making him the first bilateral transfemoral amputee to accomplish such a feat.

== Publications ==
=== Books ===
- Carroll, K., & Edelstein, J. (2006). Prosthetics and Patient Management: A Comprehensive Clinical Approach. Thorofare, NJ: SLACK Inc.. 284 pp. ISBN 1-55642-671-2

=== Research ===
- Carroll, K. (2006). Lower Extremity Socket Design and Suspension. Physical Medicine and Rehabilitation Clinics of North America, 17(1), 31–48.
- Carroll, K., & Richardson, R. (2009). Improving Outcomes for Bilateral Transfemoral Amputees: A Graduated Approach to Prosthetic Success. The Academy Today, 5(2), 2–5.
