= I Shouldn't Be Alive =

Documentary television series

- Genre: Documentary, Docudrama, Survival, Biography
- Created by: Darlow Smithson Productions
- Narrated by: Qarie Marshall and Eric Meyers
- Original language: English
- No. of seasons: 6
- No. of episodes: 58

Production
- Executive producer: John Smithson Jack E. Smith-Discovery Channel
- Running time: 60 minutes (with adverts)

Original release
- Network: Discovery Channel (2005–2006); Animal Planet (2010–2013)
- Release: 28 October 2005 – 24 February 2012

I Shouldn't Be Alive is a documentary television series made by Darlow Smithson Productions, a UK-based production company, that featured accounts of individuals or groups caught in life-threatening scenarios away from civilization in natural environments. The show aired on multiple networks in the United States, Canada, the United Kingdom, the Netherlands, Australia, New Zealand, India, Iran, Pakistan and South Africa.

The show was compiled using footage of interviews and graphic re-enactments of the situation. The main focus of the show is the re-enactment, with narration and commentary by the participant(s). Each episode also explained how the person(s) survived the ordeal against typical odds and outlined the decisions they had made that kept them alive.

== Production ==
The series premiered on the Discovery Channel on 28 October 2005 with Jack E. Smith as Executive Producer. Season 3 also airs in high definition on HD Theater. All episodes can now be seen in HD on DirecTV, Dish Network, or Verizon Fios. The show airs on Channel 7 in Australia and on Channel 4 in the United Kingdom.

On 5 March 2007, the Discovery Channel canceled the series and made it part of the "Discovery Classics" series. The show was broadcast on the Science Channel starting in early 2008. It was picked up in 2010 by Animal Planet and new episodes started to air along with the old.

As of October 2012, production of the show was on hiatus. Reruns of I Shouldn't Be Alive continued to air weekdays at 10AM (Eastern) until 2014.

== Episodes ==
=== Season 1 (2005–06) ===
No. overall	No. in season	Title	Original release date
1	1	"Shark Survivor"	28 October 2005
In October 1982, five people, Brad Cavanaugh, Deborah Scaling Riley, Mark Adams, John Lippoth and Meg Mooney get caught in a tropical storm. When their yacht sinks, they must survive in the middle of the Atlantic Ocean on a raft with no survival equipment. To their absolute horror, they find the area to be infested with sharks. Madness and infection soon begin to sweep through the survivors, and by the time rescue arrives, only two remain alive. Survivors: Brad Cavanagh and Deborah Scaling Kiley (died 2012). Deceased: Mark Adams, John Lippoth and Meg Mooney
2	2	"Lost in the Snow"	4 November 2005
In late December 1992, Jim and Jennifer Stolpa, and their five-month old son Clayton attempt to travel to a funeral when Jim's grandmother passed away. On their way there, they miss the sign that leads them to the city, and instead drive down into a remote region in Northern Nevada, where they become stuck for nine days until Jim walks to Vya for rescue. Survivors: James, Jennifer and Clayton Stolpa
3	3	"Escape from the Amazon"	11 November 2005
In December 1981, Yossi Ghinsberg, Kevin Gale, and Marcus Stamm, go to the Bolivian Amazon, where they meet Karl Ruprechter, a man who promises to take them to a native tribe's village. Eventually, they abort the mission and raft down the Tuichi River. However, due to some disagreements, Stamm and Ruprechter separate from Ghinsberg and Gale, who have to find their way to civilization. Survivors: Yossi Ghinsberg and Kevin Gale. Missing: Marcus Stamm and Karl Ruprechter
4	4	"Swept Away"	18 November 2005
In November 1994, two friends by the name of Saul Kinderis and Larry Kaiser go kayaking in the Strait of Georgia. When the tide comes in, one friend (who is very inexperienced) falls from his kayak and fears that he will end up in the Pacific Ocean. Survivors: Saul Kinderis and Larry Kaiser
5	5	"Kidnap in the Killing Fields"	25 November 2005
In 1995, Chris Moon, a former British army officer involved in demining in Mozambique, accidentally steps on a undetected landmine and blows off his right leg. Two years earlier in 1993, while he was learning demining in Cambodia, he, along with his colleagues Mr. Houn and Mr. Sock, were kidnapped by the Khmer Rouge. Survivors: Chris Moon, Mr. Houn and Mr. Sock
6	6	"Jaws of Death" "Thrown to the Lions"	2 December 2005
In 2003, biologist Greg Rasmussen crashes his plane in the African savanna. With his legs broken in six different places and in a state of intense pain and loss of leg mobility, he has to make it alive past lions and other dangerous predators. Survivor: Greg Rasmussen
7	7	"Trapped Under a Boulder" "Trapped by a Boulder"	10 March 2006
In April 1997, Warren Macdonald heads for the remote island of Hinchinbrook off the coast of Queensland, Australia, where he meets Geert van Keulen, a Dutch man also on holiday. Halfway up Mount Bowen, a one-ton slab of granite hits Macdonald and pins him down to the bed of a creek. Van Keulen must find help for his new friend before the rain drowns him. Survivor: Warren Macdonald and Geert van Keulen
8	8	"Ice Cave Survivor" "Lost on the Mountain"	17 March 2006
In January 1995, a U.S. Air Force officer and his son go on a skiing trip to Kartalkaya, Turkey. When a snowstorm arrives, they lose their way and the father must choose between staying with his son or finding help. Survivor: Michael and Matthew Couillard
9	9	"Shipwrecked" "Desert Island Shipwreck"	24 March 2006
In 1995, two cousins go for a fishing trip on the Gulf of California, but a thunderstorm rolls in and they get shipwrecked on a deserted island. Survivors: Mark Sorensen and Rob Rusnak
10	10	"Alaskan Avalanche" "Escape from Avalanche Alley"	31 March 2006
In April 1989, Dave Nyman and Jim Sweeney are scaling a sheer ice-wall on Alaska's Mount Johnson. Jim falls and is badly injured, and Dave is forced to ski down. He returns to his companion after a talk with some tourists, and they both eventually survive seven avalanches and a large crevasse together. A couple in a passing aircraft locate Dave's SOS signal and try to land the plane on Ruth Glacier, but the plane takes a hard landing and the pilot's wife suffers injuries to her back. Survivor: David "Dave" Nyman and James "Jim" Sweeney
11	11	"Lost at Sea" "Adrift in the Dark"	9 June 2006
In September 1997, two friends, who sought on repairing their relationship with their fathers, plan a fishing trip with them in Loreto, Mexico. However, an unexpected storm downs their plane and leaves them stranded in the middle of the Gulf of California. Survivor: John and Jim Hawley; and Bill and Jens Lundy
12	12	"Crash in a Volcano" "Escape from the Volcano"	16 June 2006
In November 1992, three men are filming the Puʻu ʻŌʻō crater of the Kilauea volcano for the movie Sliver on their helicopter. The helicopter suddenly loses control and crashes inside the crater. Survivor: Craig Hosking, Christopher Duddy and Mike Benson
13	13	"Lost in the African Bush" "Crashed in the Desert"	23 June 2006
In March 2000, five survivors of a private plane crash must survive the dangers of the desolate African wilderness. With two being severely injured, some of the group must wander off to find rescue, but there's no civilization for hundreds of miles. Survivor: Carl du Plessis, Neb Graorac, Mike and Lynette Nikolic, Costa Markanadatos (died years later in an unrelated flying accident)

=== Season 2 (2006) ===
No. overall	No. in season	Title	Original release date
14	1	"Nightmare Canyon" "Life or Death in Frostbite Canyon"	10 November 2006
In November 2003, brothers Justin and Jeremy Harris go canyoneering in Utah's Canyons. They expect the trip will take no more than eight hours, but when freezing temperatures come by, Justin breaks his leg and can’t continue, and Jeremy has to hike out of the canyon alone to find help. Survivor: Justin and Jeremy Harris.
15	2	"Frozen at 20,000 Feet" "Nightmare at 20,000 Feet"	17 November 2006
In April 1999, three British climbers get caught in a snow storm near the summit of Mount McKinley. After a night in a cave, one climber develops snow blindness and another volunteers to go down to base camp but breaks both his legs in a fall along the way. Survivor: Antony "Tony" Hollinshead, Nigel Vardy and Steve Ball
16	3	"Trapped Under the Ice" "Stranded in Grizzly Country"	24 November 2006
In June 2003, Blake Stanfield and his aged father Neil go kayaking in the Alaskan wilderness. Everything goes fine until they run into some ice on the river, and they soon find themselves swept underneath. They barely survive this only to be stranded in a wilderness of grizzly bears. 20 years later, Neil died. Survivor: Neil and Blake Stanfield
17	4	"Into the Heart of Darkness" "Lost in the Rainforest"	1 December 2006
In August 2002, a young man and woman, once dating, headed for the Amazon rainforest but got lost in the jungle. Crystal Ramsey, a sufferer of depression, tries to convince Dave Boyer that they have to slit their wrists so they won't die from the elements. Boyer must now take charge and lead both himself and Ramsey to safety, in an environment where both their sanity may well be on the line. Survivor: Dave Boyer and Crystal Ramsey
18	5	"Blood in the Water" "Terror on the Zambezi"	8 December 2006
In April 2004, Arthur Taylor, Alistair Gellatly, Arthur's wife Fay and parents Clive and Brenda become stranded in the hippo- and crocodile- infested Zambezi River when their watercraft is rammed by a enraged hippo and sinks. Arthur, Fay, Clive and Brenda make their way to a submerged sand flat in the middle of the river, but are otherwise stranded. Alistair swims for the shore to get help, only to make a serious error in judgement when he attempts to chase and fight a Nile crocodile that had yet to notice him. Alistair is mauled by the reptile, only just escaping with his life and sustaining brutal injuries to his arm in the process. Once on land, Alistair faces spotted hyenas, lions, driver ants and an unusual encounter with a cape buffalo which spares him in spite of its deadly reputation. Meanwhile, the others have to survive standing in the river for almost 2 days at the constant risk of being eaten alive by crocodiles and hippos, armed with nothing but an oar to defend themselves with. Though Alistair barely survives his injuries, everyone is rescued by canoeists and two tourists in a motorboat. Survivor: Clive and Brenda Kelly, Arthur and Fay Taylor and Alistair Gellatly
19	6	"Dive Into Danger"	15 December 2006
In March 2002, when filming for a documentary they are making, divers Melissa Armstrong and Captain David Tomlinson become stranded in the Pacific Ocean when their boat drifts away from them. When they believe help is not coming, they decide to swim for shore miles away or die trying. Survivor: Melissa Armstrong and David Tomlinson
20	7	"A Walk into Hell" "Horror in the Grand Canyon"	22 December 2006
In June 1996, a group of 5 teenage scouts and 3 adult guides hiked into the Grand Canyon during a heat wave; the route was an off-trail route in the vicinity of the Nankoweap Trail. As their water runs out and the older members collapse in exhaustion, 3 of the teenagers set out on their own to reach the Colorado River. Though the 3 make it to the river by free climbing down a 200 feet cliff and trekking through the arid plains at the foot of the canyon, the leader of the group, David Phillips, collapses within feet of the fresh water. A group of off-duty doctors kayaking down the river happen to spot the scouts and do everything they can to save Phillips's life, but he dies later that night. Survivor: Guy Davis, Earl and Loren Pace, Andy Davis, Joel Kieper, Mark Coons and Jordan Winegar. Deceased: David Phillips

=== Season 3 (2010) ===
No. overall	No. in season	Title	Original release date
21	1	"Trapped in the Canyon"	15 January 2010
In December 2006, two-time adventure racing world champion Danelle Ballengee suffered a pelvis-shattering 60-foot fall and 2 nights in sub-freezing weather in a canyon near Moab, Utah, accompanied only by her dog Taz. Her skeleton is split into two and some large blood vessels in her pelvis are damaged. In the end, Taz leads the rescuers to Danelle, saving her life. Survivor: Danelle Ballengee and Taz, her dog
22	2	"Date from Hell"	22 January 2010
In May 2006, Brandon Day and Gina Allen were going on a tour of the San Jacinto Mountains, but they wander off the trail despite the sound of a rushing waterfall and become stranded and alone for 4 days fighting for their lives. Survivor: Brandon Day and Gina Allen. Deceased 1 year earlier: John Joseph Donovan
23	3	"Nightmare on the Mountain"	29 January 2010
In 1995, Bram Schaffer, an elk hunter, on a hunting trip was mauled by a grizzly bear in Montana. His severely injured parts of his thigh were ripped off the bone and he must get off the mountain during a large storm. Other hunters, his father, and brother assist Schaffer during the ordeal, providing medical care and carrying him to a camp, eventually resulting in his survival. Survivor: Bram Schaffer
24	4	"Crushed and Alone" "Crushed by a Quad Bike"	5 February 2010
In January 2008, Ken Hildebrand was collecting beaver traps in rural Alberta, Canada. When he loses control of his quad bike, it topples over and lands on his legs, pinning him to the ground. Most of his survival gear is just out of reach and to make matters worse, a farm is only half a mile away, but the occupant cannot hear Ken's calls over the winds, in spite of the farm's dogs having anxiously noticed the accident. Using what supplies he can retrieve, Hildebrand must survive for 4 days in negative temperatures with the constant threat of circling coyotes trying to eat him. Survivor: Ken Hildebrand
25	5	"Boys Adrift"	19 February 2010
In April 2005, Troy Driscoll and his friend Josh Long attempt to go shark fishing in a less than seaworthy boat. When a riptide drags them into the Atlantic Ocean, they face extreme dehydration, hunger, sharks, madness, and weather for 6 days while awaiting rescue, watching helplessly as other boats pass by without seeing them. Survivor: Troy Driscoll and Joshua "Josh" Long
26	6	"Fear in Freefall"	2 April 2010
In May 2005, Will Slattery, his 2 friends, and the 2 other passengers and pilot suffered a freak accident during a skydiving trip. When their plane gets caught by a storm, it crashes into the shark infested waters of Costa Rica. Now Will faces jellyfish stings, dehydration, hungry sharks and drowning in 24 hours. Survivor: Will Slattery. Deceased: James "Jimmy" Simplicio, Emmanuel "Manny" Sanchez, Milt Burton, Jean Roman (Student) and Jorge Melendez (Pilot).
27	7	"Shattered on Impact"	9 April 2010
In 1987, four animal conservationists crash their plane when it runs out of fuel into the Zambian wilderness. With three severely injured, one man treks off into the wilderness to find help. The others must fight against the elements and the very animals the men have dedicated themselves to protect. Survivor: Clive English, Graham Child, Adam Pope, Mumba Chikungu (who later died of an unrelated illness)
28	8	"Lost in the Outback"	16 April 2010
In July 2008, Theo Rosmulder, an amateur treasure hunter who got out of heart surgery, wanders off into the Western Australian Outback after he found a gold nugget and got carried away. He must survive 5 days of physical exhaustion and the threat of heart failure without the aid of medication. Survivor: Theo Rosmulder
29	9	"Blizzard of Death"	23 April 2010
In March 2004, 3 amateur hunters and their 20 local guides become stranded in the remote mountain wilderness of Kyrgyzstan when their trapped vehicle falls into a large snow drift after their hunt. Then, just as they believe they have been saved, the rescue helicopter goes out of control and crashes not far from where they were originally trapped. The pilot and the guide tending the horses die in the crash and the others are left lost in a barren, mountainous nightmare. Survivor: Dennis and William "Spook" Spann, Clay Lancaster, 13 Kyrghiz guides, 6 government officials. Deceased: 1 Kyrghiz guide (horse tender) and helicopter pilot
30	10	"Avalanche of Terror"	30 April 2010
In January 2003, Ken Jones, a British climber, is caught in an avalanche in the Carpathian Mountains and falls off a 75ft cliff. With a shattered pelvis and broken femur, he crawls for 7 miles to reach the nearest road in temperatures as low as 5 degrees Fahrenheit (−15 degrees Celsius). Survivor: Ken Jones

=== Season 4 (2010–11) ===
No. overall	No. in season	Title	Original release date
31	1	"A Dad's Worst Nightmare"	13 October 2010
July 1998. After an overnight camping trip in the Australian Outback, Matthew McGough and his 5 year old daughter Shannon get stranded on their way back after taking a wrong turn and trying to go fishing. They survive for 8 days on limited supplies after McGough's car is burned up in an accident. Survivor: Matthew and Shannon McGough
32	2	"Shipwrecked Family"	20 October 2010
In 2005, John Silverwood, his wife Jean and his four children Ben, Amelia, Jack and Camille embark on the sailing trip of a lifetime. Halfway into the trip, they run aground on a rocky reef in Manua'e in the South Pacific. Huge waves buffet the boat and flood the cabins and John is seriously injured when the mast collapses. Manua'e is inhabited, and the family are rescued later that day by residents of the island. Survivor: John, Jean, Ben, Amelia, Jack and Camille Silverwood
33	3	"Edge of Death" "Trapped on a Ledge"	27 October 2010
September 2007. Forty-nine-year-old Charlie Hench falls off the side of a mountain during a personal hiking expedition and lands on a small ledge at 9000 feet. He is found when his friend Dave Grah, whose brother got lost in a storm 30 years earlier, hiking on the same pass, has a hunch that Hench is in the same spot. Survivor: Charlie Hench
34	4	"Crashed in the Rockies"	3 November 2010
January 2002. After crashing into a remote mountainside in the Rocky Mountains, pilot Justin Kirkbride hikes for hours in waist-deep snow (all the while looking for a cellphone signal) to save his two injured friends. The Air Force helicopter sent to rescue Justin crashes shortly after he boards it, but miraculously, everyone on board survives this accident too. Survivor: Justin Kirkbride, Lawrence "Larry" Dimond and Thomas "Tommy" Robbins; 7 U.S. Air Force personnel
35	5	"Death in the Sea of Cortez"	10 November 2010
In September 2000, 3 men are stranded on a deserted island in the Gulf of California and attempt to hike to the northern shore for 12 days to attract passing fishermen. They rely on scraps they collect in the island in order to survive. After eight days, rescuers searching on the wrong side of the island give them up for dead and Lorenzo dies on Day 12. The next day, the remaining two men are rescued by passing fishermen. Survivor: Joe Rangel and Jose Luis Ramos Garcia "Pepe". Deceased: Lorenzo "Larry" Madrid
36	6	"76 Days Adrift"	17 November 2010
Main Article: 76 Days Adrift: 1981. Steven Callahan is shipwrecked from his boat and survives for 76 days on a small life raft at sea. It's up to his wits and his quick thinking if he wants to get out of this unforgiving ocean.; Survivor: Steven Callahan
37	7	"Alone in the Amazon"	24 November 2010
In 1983, Benedict Allen is stranded in the Amazon rainforest for 28 days and faces dehydration, starvation, and malaria after his canoe is destroyed during an escape from renegade gold miners, who he overheard plotting to kill him. Near the end of his ordeal, Benedict is forced to kill and eat his dog Cashew with a machete to survive, having walked 65 miles through the Amazon to civilization. Survivor: Benedict Allen. Deceased: Allen's dog Cashew
38	8	"Vacation Nightmare" "Crashed in the Jungle"	1 December 2010
In November 2001, newlyweds Brandon and Brandy Wiley, their new friend Michael Packard, and 5 other people are plunged into the Costa Rican jungle when their plane hits clouds and falls out of the sky, killing the pilots and a passenger. The survivors have to survive violent animals and a cold rainy night. Survivor: Brandon and Brandy Wiley, Silke Friedbold, Alvaro Zuniga and Michael Packard. Deceased: 2 pilots and Adolfo Strassburger
39	9	"River of Fear"	5 January 2011
In November 1991, David Whittlesey is stranded when his raft capsizes in the Colorado River. While scaling a cliff to evaluate the situation, a handhold breaks and he plummets into the river knocking out 4 teeth, also breaking 2 toes after a rock falls on his foot. He must survive alone on a sandy alcove in the dead of winter for a full week. Survivor: David Whittlesey
40	10	"Killer Crevasse"	12 January 2011
In June 1992, Jim Davidson and Mike Price set off to climb Mount Rainier, but the return trip turns into a disaster when both fall into an 80 feet deep crevasse. Mike dies in the fall, while Jim survives due to Mike slowing him down during the fall. Using every mountaineering skill, he has ever learned, Jim must climb out of the crevasse before night falls. Survivor: James "Jim" Davidson. Deceased: Mike Price
41	11	"Hike into Hell Canyon"	19 January 2011
In August 1975, 25-year-old Linda Skvarna, with her dog Cocoa Gin, took a walk to a nearby village via the canyon, only to take a wrong turn along the way. With little supplies, she and her dog survive for 20 days in rising temperatures and sweltering heat. Survivor: Linda Skvarna and her dog Cocoa Gin
42	12	"Death Climb"	26 January 2011
In January 1999, Jamie Andrew and his friend Jamie Fisher are trapped on a ledge in the French Alps when a surprise snowstorm blows in. Because of the harsh weather, the rescue helicopter can't land which leaves Fisher dead and Andrew frostbitten. Survivor: Jamie Andrew. Deceased: Jamie Fisher
43	13	"A Family's Desert Hell" "Hell in the Desert"	2 February 2011
In August 2002, Roger Sargeant, his girlfriend Shelly and her 2 daughters Michaela and Tiffany are looking for a place to test their new firearm in the Arizona Desert. Their truck gets stuck on a wash, and they become lost and spend the next 2 days wandering around where gangs of criminals attempt to run them over and leave them to die. Survivor: Roger Sargeant, Shelly Hubbard (now Sargeant), Michaela and Tiffany Hubbard
44	14	"Ocean Disaster"	9 February 2011
June 2008. Skipper Steve Conway, safety officer Roger Stone, and their four-student crew of Texas A&M participate in the annual regatta at the Gulf of Mexico when their sailboat capsizes in the dead of night. One man sacrifices himself to save two students trapped in the cabin, and the survivors struggle to survive 26 hours in open water, battling the heat of day, avoiding sharks, the cold of night and haunted by the distant unmanned oil rig in the horizon. Survivor: Steve Conway, Travis Wright, Steven Guy, Ross Busby, and Joseph Savana. Deceased: Roger Stone
45	15	"Left for Dead on Everest" "Everest Death Zone"	16 February 2011
In May 2006, climber Lincoln Hall summits Mount Everest but on the way down, he develops life threatening cerebral edema. Sherpas, themselves at risk in the low oxygen death zone, assist his descent but abandon him at 28,000 feet when he falls unconscious and is believed beyond help. During the night, Lincoln, his death already announced, awakens and that morning is found by Dan Mazur and his group of climbers during their summit attempt. Survivor: Lincoln Hall
46	16	"A Father's Deadly Dilemma" "Snowmobile Nightmare"	23 February 2011
In March 2003, David Hunt and his 11-year-old daughter Leia are En route via snowmobile to their cottage in Maniwaki, Quebec, Canada. Their snowmobile flips, throwing David into a ravine. He eventually climbs out, but his knee is shattered, and he can't continue. It's up to Leia to save her dad's life and to stay alive and she must avoid wolves. Survivor: David Hunt (Jonathan Phillips) and Leia Hunt-Hans

=== Season 5 (2011) ===
No. overall	No. in season	Title	Original release date
47	1	"Avalanche!"	6 July 2011
In Montana, five skiers on the slopes of Nemesis Mountain in the state's Centennial Mountains range are ravaged by a massive avalanche on New Year's Day, 2005. Sam suffers a gruesome compound fracture to his leg and Blake (who triggered the avalanche) is killed by blunt-force trauma. The three remaining friends fight to keep Sam alive through a growing storm, but his leg is starting to decompose and the rescue helicopter can't land in the weather. A team of paramedics arrive on skis, and eventually the storm clears for long enough to the helicopter to land and rescue the group after Matt, Chris and Jason trample the thick snow cover down to make an impromptu helipad. Survivor: Sam Kavanagh, Matt Schuyler, Chris Maki, Jason Thompson. Deceased: Blake Morstad
48	2	"Blood on the Mountain"	13 July 2011
On 20 March 2009 in New Zealand, 33-year-old Matthew Briggs, traveling with his dog Little Dog, loses balance, slides down a hill on the slopes of Mount Cook and falls 15 feet onto rocks, breaking his ankle and wrist, and sustaining deep cuts to his thigh. He camps for a week, and he is then forced to hobble for two days down the mountain to a nearby hut where he is rescued by two hunters. Survivor: Matthew "Matt" Briggs and Little Dog.
49	3	"Christmas Horror"	27 July 2011
Two hikers in New Zealand take a risky detour around an ice wall, eventually becoming stuck on a potentially unstable rock ledge for 10 days, including Christmas Day. They are unable to escape the ledge because of several days of rainfall and a whole night of snow. Survivor: Marni Sheppeard and Sonja Rendell.
50	4	"First Date Nightmare" "Trapped in a High Place"	22 July 2011
Two climbers on a first date in the Swiss Alps nearly summit a mountain, but are stopped by ice. A massive storm has formed in the valley below, and the climbers are forced to descend through the treacherous conditions. They end up trapped on a ledge. Survivor: Jeremy Colenso and Rachel Kelsey.
51	5	"Climb out of Hell"	30 September 2011
November 2009. Jordan Nicurity, a Canadian photographer, falls 20 feet from a cliff face and shatters his pelvis while on an expedition to Hornby Island, British Columbia. He is forced to crawl more than a mile through horrendous conditions, only to find that the only way to get to safety is to scale the very cliff that he had fallen from in the first place. Survivor: Jordan Nicurity.
52	6	"'Til Death Do Us Part"	30 September 2011
July 2009. An off-road adventure goes terribly wrong when the Bosworths' jeep rolls, leaving them stranded in the rugged canyons of New Mexico. They face a grueling four-day hike out of the area, and when Lynda becomes too weak to continue, Tom is forced to continue on to save his dying wife. Survivor: Tom and Lynda Bosworth.

=== Season 6 (2011–12) ===
No. overall	No. in season	Title	Original release date
53	1	"Chasm of Death"	7 October 2011
A 2002 hike in Leprechaun Canyon, Utah turns into a nightmare when three friends take a wrong turn and end up trapped deep in a slot canyon on one of the most technical routes in the area. The situation takes a tragic turn for the worse when Ben, attempting to climb out, falls 70 feet and sustains a severe head injury. The others must fight to keep him alive, deep in a canyon with no way out. Survivor: Benjamin "Ben" Gowans, Clay Craig and Jason "Jay" Cox.
54	2	"Volcano Vacation Hell"	7 October 2011
In July 2005, Dewey Gaedcke goes on a sightseeing trip to Hawaii, only to become lost on a lava plain on Kilauea, one of the most consistently active volcanoes in the world. He must fight against the elements, dehydration and a spreading infection in his foot to survive in an inhospitable landscape with only his video camera to keep him sane. Although he manages to find a small pocket of jungle amongst the rugged terrain, several helicopters fly over the area and completely ignore his attempts at signalling them, and his morale slowly breaks down. Ultimately, Gilbert is rescued after five days on the volcano, when a teenager riding as a passenger in a sightseeing helicopter notices him from above. Survivor: Gilbert "Dewey" Gaedcke
55	3	"Dive of Terror"	14 October 2011
In 2006, a Navy diver on a recreational diving trip is dragged out to sea by a rip current off the coast of New Zealand. He desperately tries to find a way to survive the open water and to be seen by rescuers. His fate is in the hands of the currents of the sea, which may either send him back to the shore or further out into the open ocean. Survivor: Robert Hewitt
56	4	"Escape from Bear Mountain"	14 October 2011
In July 2010, two friends have to hike out of the wilderness after their plane crashes in Alaska and badly injures both with Gary a fractured skull and Dave 2 ribs and a collarbone broken. They are in bear country and encounter several bears on their way out while they face their injuries and hypothermia. They must get to a nearby river that can lead them to civilization. Survivor: Dave Akers and Gary Nall
57	5	"Lost in the Jungle"	17 February 2012
In 1993, a young man on a sightseeing trip to the Mayan ruins on Cozumel Island, Mexico wanders away from his tour group. With temperatures rising above 100 degrees Fahrenheit (38 degrees Celsius) and the denseness of the jungle, he ends up in a 19-day fight for survival with nothing but his sheer willpower as he tries to find his way out. Survivor: Ken Wilson
58	6	"Perfect Storm"	24 February 2012
Halloween 1991. In an attempt to rescue a stranded fisherman during a storm, a Coast Guard helicopter experiences a breakdown and crashes into the North Atlantic Ocean. Now it is the rescuers that need rescuing. After bailing out of their downed helicopter, the men battle waves ten stories high, relying on each other to stay alive. Survivor: Lt. Col. Dave Ruvola, Lt. Col. Graham Buschor, Jim Mioli, and Tech. Sgt. John Spillane. The stranded fisherman was rescued by the Coast Guard. Missing and Assumed Deceased: Arden "Rick" Smith
