= Dolphin Tale 2 =

- Theatrical release poster
- Directed by: Charles Martin Smith
- Written by: Charles Martin Smith
- Based on: Characters by Karen Janszen and Noam Dromi
- Produced by: Robert Engelman; Broderick Johnson; Andrew A. Kosove
- Starring: Harry Connick Jr.; Ashley Judd; Nathan Gamble; Kris Kristofferson; Cozi Zuehlsdorff; Morgan Freeman
- Cinematography: Daryn Okada
- Edited by: Harvey Rosenstock
- Music by: Rachel Portman
- Production company: Alcon Entertainment
- Distributed by: Warner Bros. Pictures
- Release date: September 12, 2014
- Running time: 107 minutes
- Country: United States
- Language: English
- Budget: $36 million
- Box office: $57.8 million

Dolphin Tale 2 is a 2014 American family film written and directed by Charles Martin Smith as the sequel to his 2011 film Dolphin Tale and the second and final installment in the Dolphin Tale franchise. Which in-turn was based on the true story about a rescued bottlenose dolphin named Winter who made her final on-screen appearance in this film before her death in November 2021. In addition to Winter, most of the cast from the first film also reprise their roles including Harry Connick Jr., Ashley Judd, Nathan Gamble, Cozi Zuehlsdorff, Kris Kristofferson, Morgan Freeman, Austin Stowell, Tom Nowicki, Austin Highsmith, Betsy Landin and Juliana Harkavy while Hope made her film debut. It was released on September 12, 2014, and tells the story of another dolphin at the Clearwater Marine Aquarium named "Hope". After Winter's elderly companion and surrogate mother, Panama, dies, Winter's future is in jeopardy, unless Sawyer, Clay, Hazel, and the rest of the team can find a new companion for her. The film received mixed reviews from critics and grossed $57.8 million.

== Plot ==
Three years after saving Winter, the staff at Clearwater Marine Aquarium rescue a severely sunburned beached dolphin, named Mandy after a little girl who finds her. A now 14-year-old Sawyer is offered a scholarship to the elite SEA Semester program, which involves three months at sea doing marine mammal research, after impressing his cousin Kyle's advisor Dr. Miguel Arroyo when champion surfer Bethany Hamilton swims with him and Winter. Sawyer is reluctant to go to the program because he is concerned about leaving Winter.

Winter needs attention and shows signs of stress and loneliness, especially after her older companion, Panama, dies from old age. Acting on Rufus the pelican's erratic behavior one morning, Sawyer and Hazel find and rescue a sea turtle from some fishing line. Rufus becomes obsessed with the sea turtle, named Mavis, to the point he even watches her during a CT scan at the hospital where Lorraine works.

Meanwhile, George Hatton, a USDA inspector, insists that Winter must be matched with a new companion within 30 days or be transferred elsewhere. However, Winter's behavior has become unpredictable, even dangerous; when Sawyer tries to get her out of the tank to prepare to make her a new prosthetic tail, she becomes aggressive and knocks him into the water, injuring him. Dr. Clay prohibits Sawyer from swimming with Winter until further notice. Winter spends weeks in isolation, and despite people not being allowed to visit her, Sawyer allows Susie, a new volunteer, and her grandfather to see her. Hazel, who has feelings for Sawyer, becomes slightly jealous due to Sawyer getting attention from another girl.

Sawyer and Hazel hope Mandy will become Winter's companion. Mandy's rehabilitation at CMA goes well, so Clay contemplates releasing her soon, causing alarm for Hazel in particular. Lorraine advises Hazel that no one spends any more time at a hospital than they need to and encourages her to talk with her father. Hazel assertively yet respectfully asks Clay to let her view Mandy's medical records, which he does. Clay, Sawyer, and Hazel test Mandy's readiness by giving her three live fish, which she catches effortlessly, so they reluctantly decide they must release her. Clay puts Hazel in charge of her release.

A few days later, Sawyer and Hazel are scrubbing the pool's walls, Hazel asks Sawyer is he booked his flight to Boston, but Sawyer says that he isn't sure about going, much to Hazel's disbelief. Following an argument, Sawyer and Hazel break the rules and swim with Winter, who appears to be feeling better. Clay finds them doing so and scolds them, but then states that it does not matter, because George issued an order that Winter be transferred to a marine park in Texas. Meanwhile, Lorraine and Sawyer's friends arrange a going-away party for Sawyer's anticipated participation in SEA Semester, although he still cannot decide whether to go. Dr. McCarthy shows him an old watch which must be tapped to keep ticking, and so encourages Sawyer to "shake it up now and then" and try new things in life.

During the party, Clay is informed that another female dolphin has been rescued and is headed to CMA; one so young that she has not yet learned how to hunt and cannot return to the wild. This offers new hope of companionship for Winter, so they name her "Hope". Meanwhile, Mavis is released, and Rufus follows her out to sea.

George gives Clay an extension to keep Winter from being transferred, and CMA tries to introduce Hope as her new companion. When they attempt to introduce the two, Hope panics and circles the pool at high speed, forcing staff members to quickly separate the two dolphins. They realize that Hope had sensed that Winter had no tail and moved differently from other dolphins. Sawyer thinks that a new prosthetic tail might have better results; though Phoebe, Rebecca, and Kat are initially wary of the potential repercussions, everyone agrees.

In her second meeting with Hope, Winter wears the new tail designed by Dr. McCarthy. A huge crowd, including George, is present to watch, and eventually the two dolphins accept each other. Everyone rejoices that Winter can stay at CMA now that she has a companion. With his uncertainty about Winter resolved, Sawyer decides to go to the SEA Semester program, but reassures her that he will be back. Hazel says goodbye to him by releasing helium balloons and holding up a sign expressing her feelings of love for him, and Sawyer sends her a text message saying, "Thanks, Hazel. You're the best!", causing her to blush as she smiles to herself, while Rufus returns to the aquarium. As Sawyer, Kyle and Lorraine drive away, Hazel quietly affirms she will really miss Sawyer.

Real-life footage shown at the end includes Mandy's actual release, Hope's rescue, a sea turtle named Mavis and her release, Winter wearing the new prosthetic tail, and amputees interacting with Winter.

== Cast ==
- Winter as herself, a bottlenose dolphin that had to have her tail flukes amputated after getting caught in a crab trap who swims with the aid of a prosthetic tail.
- Hope as herself, a young bottlenose dolphin who was found with her deceased mother and brought to Clearwater for care. She later becomes Winter's new companion after the passing of her old friend, Panama.
- Harry Connick Jr. as Dr. Clay Haskett, Hazel's father and Reed's son who runs the Clearwater Marine Aquarium.
- Ashley Judd as Lorraine Nelson, Sawyer's mother.
- Kris Kristofferson as Reed Haskett, Clay's father and Hazel's grandfather.
- Nathan Gamble as Sawyer Nelson, the boy who found Winter three years earlier and has since then become an expert in the field of marine biology, Winter's trainer, and Hazel’s best friend.
- Cozi Zuehlsdorff as Hazel Haskett, Clay's daughter, Reed's granddaughter and Sawyer's best friend who starts to develop feelings for Sawyer in the movie.
- Morgan Freeman as Dr. Cameron McCarthy, the prosthetic designer who designed Winter's tail three years earlier.
- Bethany Hamilton as herself.
- Denisea Wilson as Julia.
- Julia Jordan as Mandy, a little girl who finds a dolphin stranded on the beach at the beginning of the movie.
- Austin Stowell as Kyle Connellan, Sawyer's cousin who has recovered from his injury and depression since he was wounded in the army three years earlier.
- Kim Ostrenko as Alyce Connellan, Kyle's mother, Sawyer's aunt, and Lorraine's sister.
- Juliana Harkavy as Rebecca, a marine veterinarian at the aquarium.
- Austin Highsmith as Phoebe, a marine animal trainer at the aquarium and Clay's assistant.
- Betsy Landin as Kat, Panama's trainer and later Hope's.
- Lee Karlinsky as Troy, Mandy's older brother.
- Taylor Blackwell as Susie, an aquarium volunteer who takes a liking to Sawyer.
- Carlos Gomez as Dr. Miguel Arroyo, Kyle's advisor at Boston University who's impressed by Sawyer's work with Winter.
- Denis Arndt as Veteran Dennis, Susie's grandfather.
- Tom Hillmann as Mel Prince
- Tom Nowicki as Philip J. Hordern
- Charles Martin Smith as George Hatton
- Emily Coston as Hazel's photo double

== Production ==
Unlike the first film, the sequel was not filmed in native 3D. Filming began on October 7, 2013, at Clearwater Marine Aquarium in Clearwater, Florida.

According to Clearwater Marine Aquarium CEO, David Yates, filming ended on January 22, 2014. It was released on September 12, 2014.

=== Marketing ===
The film's first teaser trailer was released on April 11, 2014, attached with theatrical screenings of Rio 2. A second trailer was released on June 13, attached with How to Train Your Dragon 2.

== Reception ==
=== Critical reception ===
On Rotten Tomatoes, the film has a rating of 66%, based on 86 reviews, with an average rating of 5.9/10; the consensus states: "Much like its predecessor, Dolphin Tale 2 offers animal antics and sweet, old-fashioned drama that the whole family can enjoy." On Metacritic, the film has a rating of 58 out of 100, based on 27 critics, indicating "mixed or average" reviews.

=== Home media ===
Dolphin Tale 2 was released on Blu-ray, DVD and digital media on December 9, 2014.

== Music ==
The film featured two songs that were released for the movie, including "You Got Me" by Gavin DeGraw and "Brave Souls" by Cozi Zuehlsdorff.

== Possible sequel ==
At a press conference speaking about the possibilities for a new Clearwater Marine Aquarium, David Yates, the CEO, revealed that discussions have begun towards the development of a third Dolphin Tale movie and a television series. A web series titled Rescue Clearwater premiered on February 1, 2016, on YouTube. On November 11, 2021, Winter died from a gastrointestinal infection at the age of 16, which leaves a third Dolphin Tale film uncertain.
