= Agnes Island =

Island in Queensland, Australia

- Interactive map of Agnes Island

Geography
- Location: Queensland, Australia
- Coordinates: 18.355°S 146.328°E
- Adjacent to: Coral Sea

Administration
- Australia
- State: Queensland

Agnes Island is a very small island a few hundred metres east of Hinchinbrook Island, Queensland, Australia. At low tide, it can be accessed from nearby Banksia Bay. Its 13 hectares or 0.13 square km in size.

To the west of Agnes Island is an open, 3 km wide, north facing bay. It contains four beaches, all bordered by prominent headlands and backed by steeply rising, densely vegetated slopes, with the 1000 m high peak called The Thumb just 2 km to the west of the main beach. There is no development and no vehicle access to any of the beaches.

Beach 816 lies immediately in lee of Agnes Island and at low tide connects the island to the mainland. The beach faces essentially north-east and is predominantly sandy, with numerous rocks outcropping along and off the 50 m wide main beach, while in the southern corner a boulder beach dominates and links the island at low tide.
