= Thorsborne Trail =

Bushwalking trail in Queensland, Australia

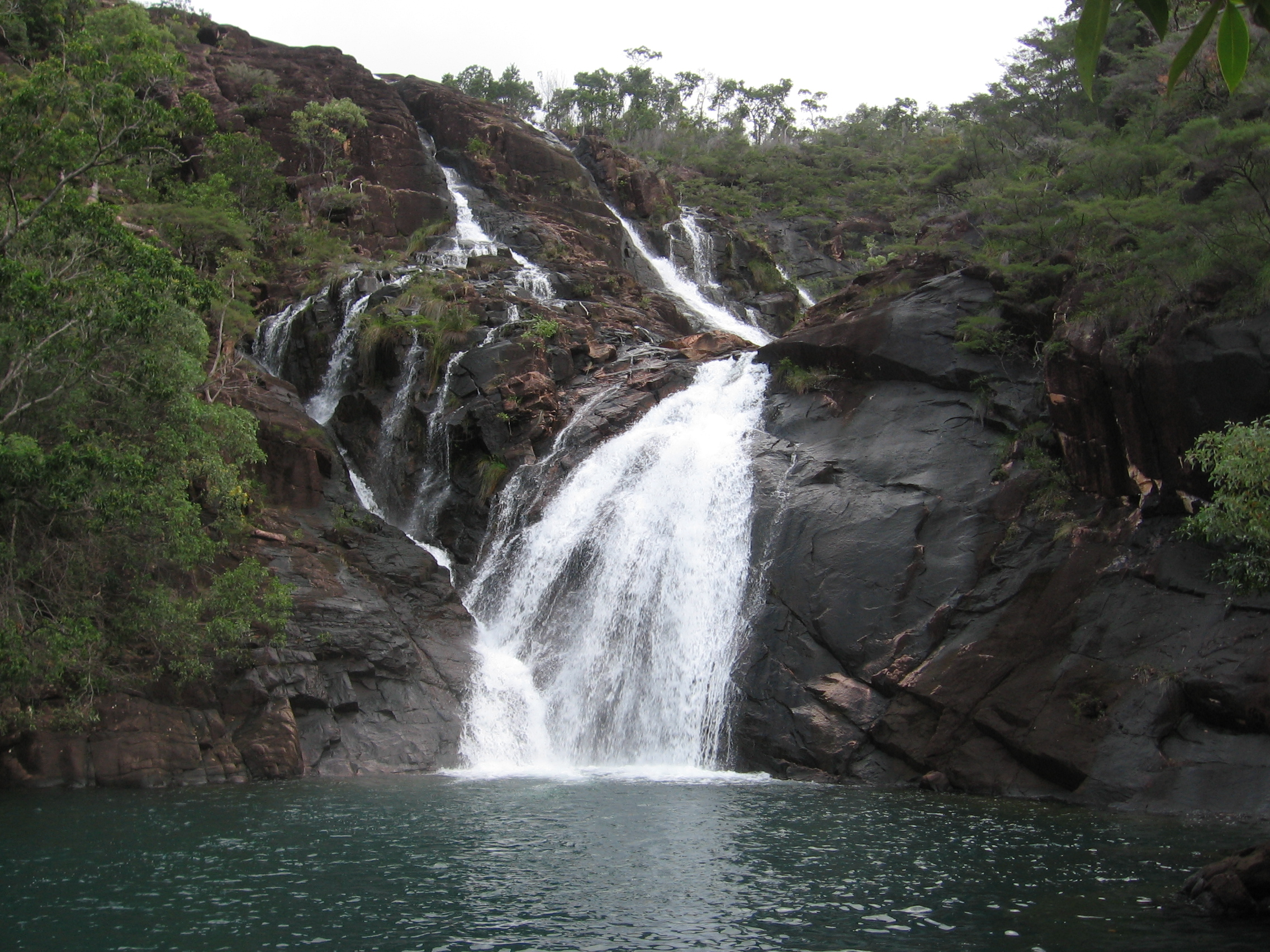
- Zoe Falls, 2006
- Length: 32 km (20 mi)
- Location: Hinchinbrook Island, Queensland, Australia
- Designation: Long-Distance Walk Trail
- Use: Hiking
- Difficulty: Grade 4
- Season: After the wet season, in the cooler months.
- Waymark: Yellow and orange trail marker
- Hazards: Summer heat, Lack of water
- Right of way: Pedestrian
- Maintainer: Queensland National Parks and Wildlife Services
- Website: parks.des.qld.gov.au/parks/hinchinbrook-thorsborne

Trail map
- The Thorsborne Trail, shown in red, is a long-distance walk trail on Hinchinbrook Island from the north to south.

The Thorsborne Trail is a popular long-distance bushwalking trail in Queensland, Australia. It runs along the east coast of Hinchinbrook Island National Park and is 32 kilometres (20 mi) long. The island is part of Wet Tropics of Queensland. It has been described as "iconic" by Australian Geographic and one of the best multi-day hiking trails across Australia by The Guardian. The track is accessed by private ferry services to/from Ramsay Bay (from Cardwell) or George Point (from Lucinda) – the schedule varies based on tides.

A maximum of 40 hikers per day are permitted along the track. This limit means at peak times bookings six months in advance are required.

Wet weather in the summer months can make creek crossings more difficult. The track is not graded and is rough in parts.

The trail begins at Ramsay bay and finishes at George point, only 3km from the port of Lucinda.

== History ==
Margaret Thorsborne, and her husband Arthur Thorsborne, were Australian naturalist, conservationist and environmental activist who are commemorated by the Thorsborne Trail.

== See also ==
- List of long-distance hiking tracks in Australia
