= Austin Highsmith Garces =

American actress

Austin Highsmith Garces, also credited as Austin Highsmith (born March 31, 1981), is an American actress.

Garces played Phoebe in Dolphin Tale as well as the sequel, Dolphin Tale 2 and Garces later co-wrote a Lifetime film based on the series. She later wrote and co-starred in Harvest of the Heart.

In January 2023, she originated the role of Annie in Warren Leight's Home Front at Burbank's Victory Theater Center.

Garces is from Winston-Salem, North Carolina and was a 1999 graduate of Richard J. Reynolds High School.
