= Kim Ostrenko =

American actress

Kim Ostrenko is an American actress known for her roles in television, film, and theatre.

== Early life and education ==
Kim Ostrenko was born and raised in Miami, Florida, where she lived with her family on a small sailboat on the Miami River until the age of five. Ostrenko graduated from Florida International University with a Bachelor of Fine Arts in theater.

== Career ==
She has been honored with two Carbonell Awards for Best Supporting Actress and three for Best Ensemble for her theater work. Among her more famous credits in TV and film are: Burn Notice, HBO's From the Earth to the Moon, Boynton Beach Club, Sex Drive and Bachelor Party 2.

Ostrenko has worked with Ashley Judd and Kris Kristofferson (Dolphin Tale), Seth Green (Sex Drive).

== Filmography ==
=== Film ===
Year	Title	Role	Notes
1997	Catherine's Grove	Pamela	
1997	Entwined	Julia Myers	
2005	Boynton Beach Club	Linda	
2006	Chat	Annie	
2007	Sweat	Stage Manager	
2008	Bachelor Party 2: The Last Temptation	Irene	
2008	Sex Drive	Mrs. Lafferty	
2009	Jarring	Olive	
2010	Loving the Bad Man	Marion Thompson	
2010	Lost Everything	Hotel Clerk	
2011	Dolphin Tale	Alyce Connellan	
2014	Dolphin Tale 2	Alyce Connellan	
2017	A Change of Heart	Dr. Charlene Johnston	
2019	Waves	Mom	Uncredited

=== Television ===
Year	Title	Role	Notes
1991	The Phantom of the Opera	Madame Giry	Television film
1991	Detective Extralarge	Mrs. Beckman / Woman Hypnotized	2 episodes
1998	From the Earth to the Moon	Louise Shepard	Episode: "For Miles and Miles"
2009	Burn Notice	Facility Manager	Episode: "Hot Spot"
2012	Magic City	Nurse	Episode: "Atonement"
2013	Graceland	Nancy	Episode: "Happy Endings"
2015	Ballers	Losing Customer	Episode: "Gaslighting"
2015	Real Rob	Customer	Episode: "VIPTreatment"
2016	Bloodline	Lowry's Wife	2 episodes
2017	Tycoon	Woman on Plane	Episode: "Priorities"
2018	Grown	Casting Agent	Episode: "Cache Me Outside"
2021	David Makes Man	Mrs. Childs	Episode: "Hurston"
