= Winter (dolphin) =

Bottlenose dolphin (2005–2021)

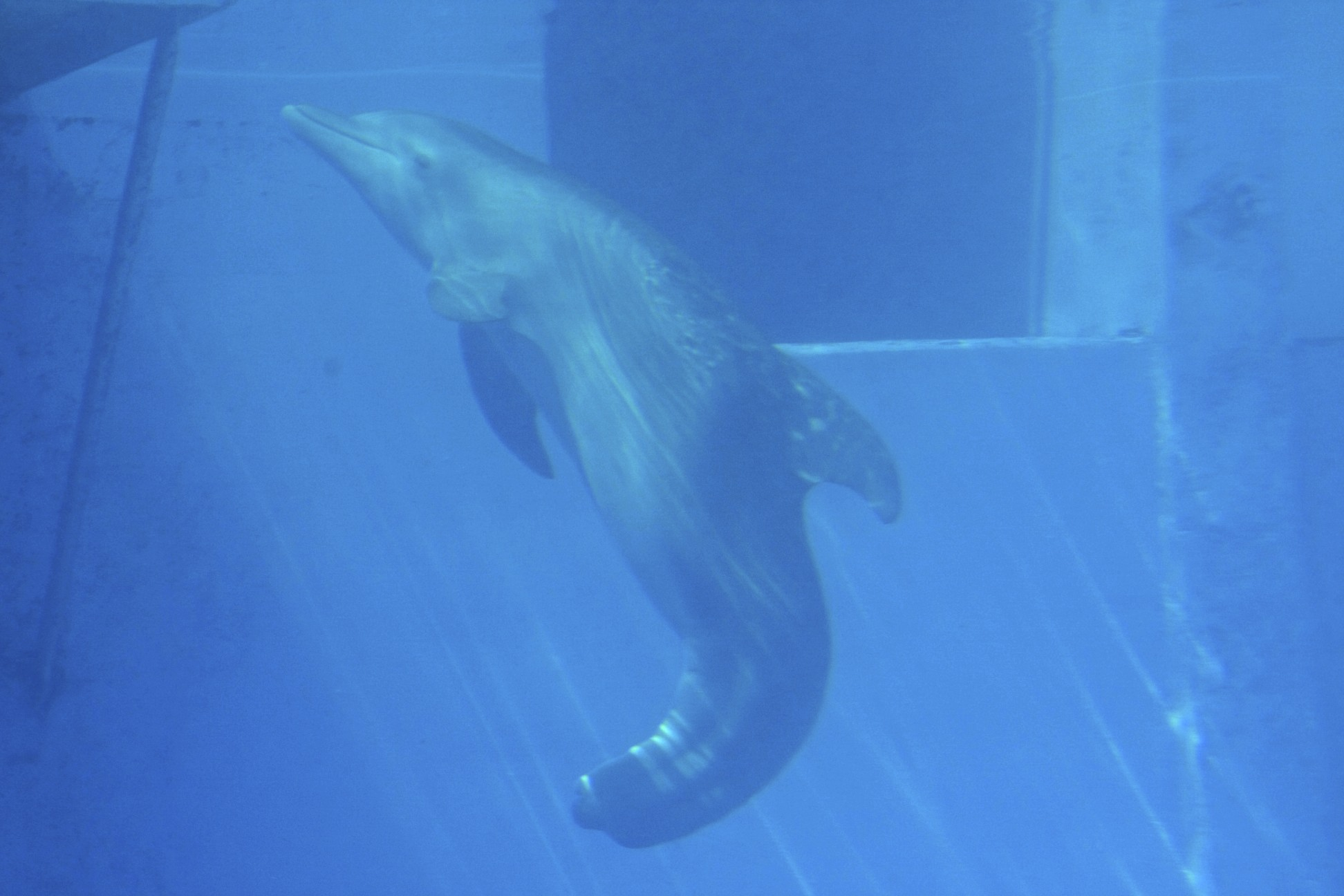
- Winter swimming without her tail
- Species: Tursiops truncatus
- Born: c. October 2005; Mosquito Lagoon, Florida, U.S.
- Died: November 11, 2021 (aged 16); Clearwater, Florida, U.S.
- Resting place: Ashes released in Gulf of Mexico
- Notable role: Herself in Dolphin Tale and Dolphin Tale 2
- Years active: 2005–2021
- Known for: Prosthetic tail
- Owner: Clearwater Marine Aquarium
- www.cmaquarium.org/animals/dolphins/winter/

Winter (c. October 2005 – November 11, 2021) was a bottlenose dolphin at the Clearwater Marine Aquarium in Clearwater, Florida, United States, and was widely known for having a prosthetic tail. Winter was the subject of the 2009 book Winter's Tale, the 2011 film Dolphin Tale, and its 2014 sequel.

Winter was found in the coastal waters of Florida on December 10, 2005. At the time, she was just a young dolphin around two months old. She had become entangled in a crab trap line, which was cutting into and deforming her peduncle and tail flukes. Despite rescue efforts by the Florida Fish and Wildlife Conservation Commission and being transported to Clearwater Marine Aquarium, her injuries were too severe and the majority of her tail was lost to necrosis. The loss of her tail caused Winter to swim unnaturally with her tail moving side to side instead of up and down. The team at Clearwater Marine Aquarium made intensive efforts to accommodate Winter and give her a good quality of life. A major breakthrough came when they partnered with Hanger Clinic, a provider for prosthetics, and created the first-ever functional prosthetic tail for a dolphin. Winter's new tail was used primarily for physical therapy and allowed her to swim with the same speed, flexibility and maneuverability as a dolphin with a biological fluke.

Winter became a highly popular attraction at the aquarium. She was first introduced to a dolphin named Panama and later lived with two other dolphins, Hope and PJ.

== Discovery and treatment ==
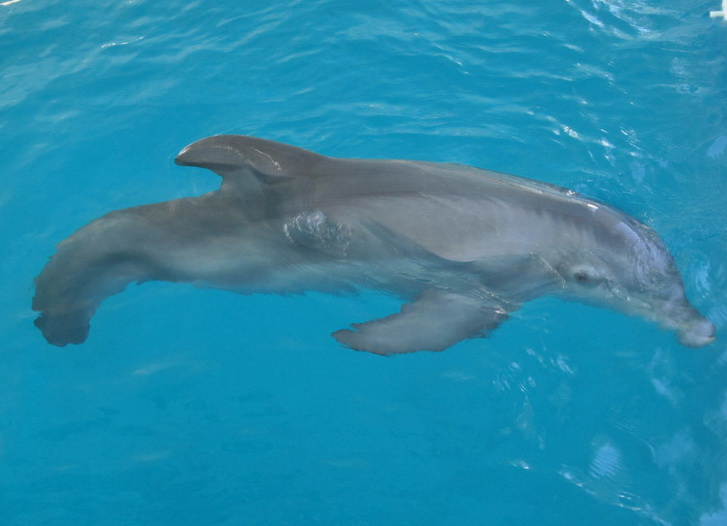
Winter in 2011

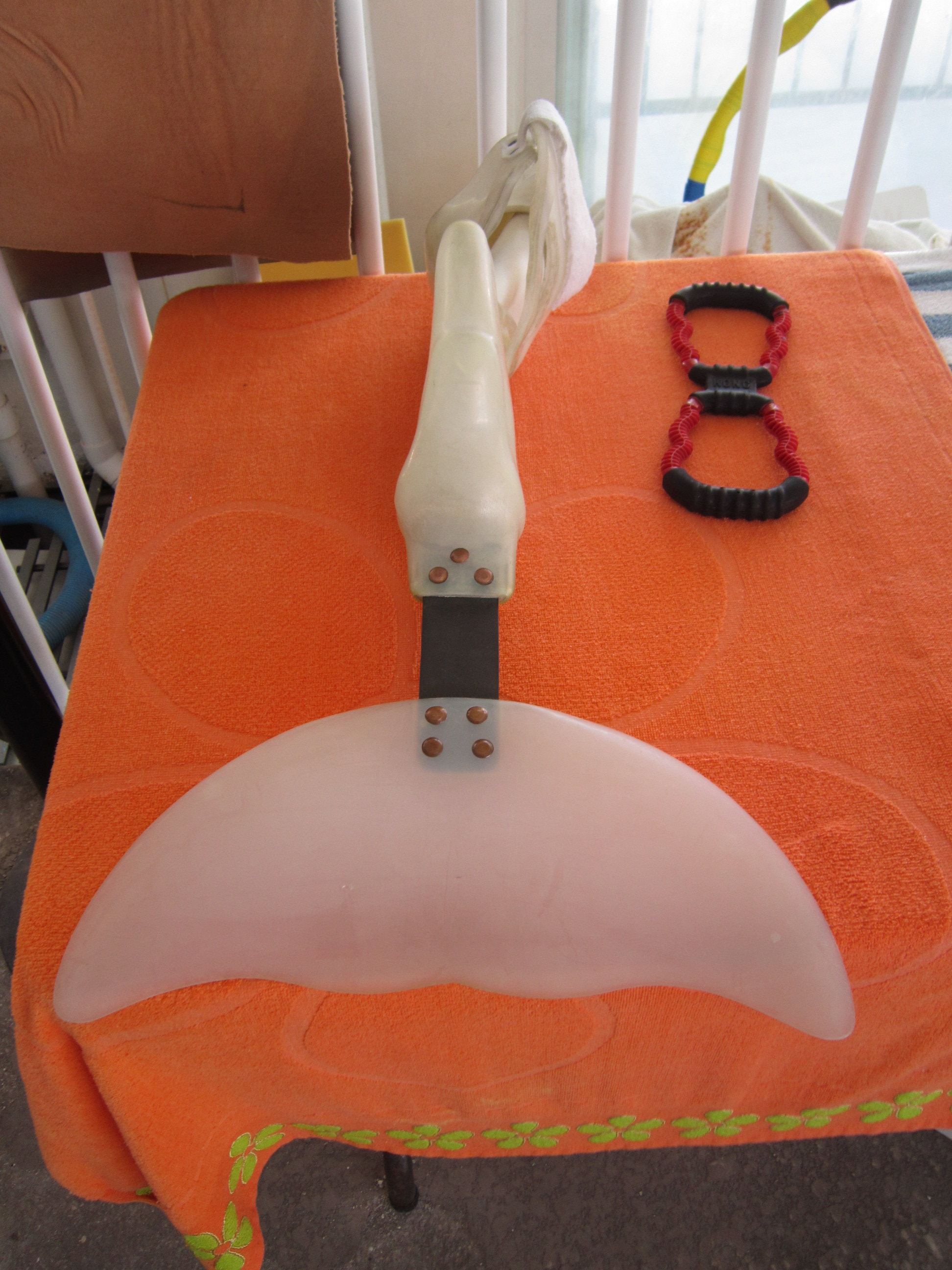
Winter's prosthetic tail

Winter was found in the ropes of a crab trap on December 10, 2005 in Mosquito Lagoon of the coastal waters of Florida. At the time of her rescue, she was estimated to be about two months old.

Winter received her name because she was found in December, traditionally considered a winter month, even though the exact date of her rescue falls within the American definition of autumn. The rope in which Winter was entangled cut off the supply of blood to her tail, leading to necrosis and her tail's disintegration.

Irish prosthetist Kevin Carroll and a team of experts took a year and a half designing and testing a tail for Winter, eventually settling on a simple silicone and plastic tail in 2007. A gel-like sleeve was used under the tail in order to prevent it from irritating Winter's skin. The gel-like sleeve was named WintersGel prosthetic liner. This consists of a gentle adhesion which protects and cushions the skin preventing irritation and burns allowing for an extended period of wear. The specialized sleeve is especially beneficial after surgery because it helps the scar tissue to accept the prosthetic, with less pain and irritation. However, Winter's flukes and peduncle had been severed, making the task much more difficult.

Knowledge gleaned from treating Winter was applied to human amputees, as when Carroll used the same gel sleeve concept to ease painful prosthetic limbs for United States Air Force senior airman Brian Kolfage, who lost both legs and his right hand in a 2004 mortar attack in Iraq.

== Public recognition ==
Winter became the most popular attraction at the Clearwater Marine Aquarium and was viewed as an inspiration to people with disabilities. Brock Mealer (brother of Michigan Wolverines player Elliott Mealer), who was paralyzed in a car accident, met Winter in December 2010. The event attracted significant press coverage. Books and even Nintendo games have been published about Winter.

In 2009, Winter's story was told by Craig Hatkoff in a children's book titled Winter’s Tail: How One Little Dolphin Learned to Swim Again. The book was published by Turtle Pond Publications and Scholastic. Hatkoff's short book was adapted into an interactive storybook on the Nintendo DS, under the same title.

A film based on Winter's story, titled Dolphin Tale, was released September 23, 2011. Winter portrayed herself in the film. The film depicted Winter's rescue and the pioneering of her prosthetic tail. Several modifications were made to the Clearwater Marine Aquarium to accommodate her, including a new 80,000-gallon pool. The film was shot at the Clearwater Marine Aquarium, and other locations in Pinellas County, Florida.

A sequel, Dolphin Tale 2, was released in theaters on September 12, 2014, and introduced Hope, the dolphin who lived with Winter. Bethany Hamilton who lost her arm to a shark attack while surfing, made an appearance in the Dolphin Tale 2 movie.

== Death ==
On November 7, 2021, Clearwater Marine Aquarium announced early tests that indicated Winter was showing signs of a gastrointestinal infection. The aquarium announced on November 10 that Winter's condition was critical. During preparation for an exploratory surgery on November 11, at approximately 8:00pm local time, Winter died at the age of 16. Her remains were cremated and her ashes were later released into the Gulf of Mexico on January 13, 2022.

== See also ==
- List of individual cetaceans
