= The Thumb (Queensland) =

Mountain in Australia

- Location within Queensland

Highest point
- Elevation: 981 m (3,219 ft)
- Prominence: 120 m (390 ft)
- Parent peak: Mount Bowen
- Coordinates: 18°21′37″S 146°16′36″E

Geography
- Location: Hinchinbrook Island, Queensland, Australia

Climbing
- First ascent: In 1953 by Jon Stephenson, John Comino, Geoff Broadbent, Dave Stewart, and Ian McLeod.

The Thumb is a peak of the Mount Bowen massif on Hinchinbrook Island, off the north-east coast of Queensland, Australia. It rises 981 metres (3,219 ft) out of the Coral Sea. The first ascent by Europeans was in 1953 by Jon Stephenson, John Comino, Geoff Broadbent, Dave Stewart, and Ian McLeod from the University of Queensland's Bushwalking Club (UQBWC).

== See also ==
- List of mountains of Australia
