= Mount Straloch =

Mountain in Queensland, Australia

- Location within Queensland

Highest point
- Elevation: 922 m (3,025 ft)
- Coordinates: 18.4583°S 146.2925°E

Geography
- Location: Hinchinbrook Island, Queensland, Australia

Mount Straloch is a mountain on Hinchinbrook Island, off the northeast coast of Queensland, Australia. It rises 922 metres (3,025 ft) out of the Coral Sea.

In 1942, during World War II, an American B-24 Liberator bomber of the United States Army Air Force crashed into a mountain on the island, killing all 12 crewmen on board.

== See also ==
- List of mountains of Australia
