= Hanger, Inc. =

American healthcare company

Hanger Prosthetics and Orthotics
- Type: Private
- Traded as: NYSE: HNGR
- Industry: Prosthetics, Medical equipment
- Headquarters: Austin, Texas
- Owner: Patient Square Capital
- Number of employees: 4,900
- Divisions: Hanger Clinic, Hanger Fabrication Network
- Subsidiaries: Accelerated Care Plus Corp., Innovative Neurotronics, Linkia, Southern Prosthetic Supply, Inc. (SPS), SureFit
- Website: hanger.com

Hanger, Inc. (formerly Hanger Orthopedic Group, Inc.) is a leading American provider of products and services that assist in enhancing or restoring the physical capabilities of patients with disabilities or injuries that is headquartered in Austin, Texas (formerly Bethesda, Maryland). The company provides orthotic and prosthetic (O&P) services, distributes O&P devices and components, manages O&P networks, and provides therapeutic solutions to patients and businesses in acute, post-acute, and clinical settings. Hanger, Inc. operates through two segments: Patient Care and Products & Services.

The primary division of Hanger, Inc.'s Patient Care segment is Hanger Clinic (formerly Hanger Prosthetics and Orthotics), which specializes in the design, fabrication, and delivery of custom O&P devices through 677 patient care clinics, with 109 satellite locations in 44 states, as well as the District of Columbia as of September 30, 2018. According to the company's 2017 annual report, the patient care market for prosthetic and orthotic services in the United States is estimated at $4 billion annually. Hanger Clinic represents about 20 percent of this market. The company employs approximately 4,600 people, including about 1,500 prosthetic and orthotic practitioners.

Notable Hanger patients include:

- Jeremy Campbell, winner of two gold medals in the 2008 Paralympic Games, and world-record holder for the Pentathlon P44;
- Aron Ralston a mountain climber who became famous in May 2003, when he amputated his lower right arm with a dull knife in order to free himself from a fallen boulder
- A notable non-human Hanger patient is Winter, a bottlenose dolphin (the main attraction at Clearwater Marine Aquarium) notable for her prosthetic tail (designed and manufactured by Hanger)

== History ==
James Edward Hanger, the first documented amputee of the American Civil War, founded the company in Virginia in 1861.

A remark in Ambrose Bierce's postwar memoir that "We shot off a Confederate leg at Philippi" refers to Hanger. At 18 years of age, Hanger joined the Confederate cavalry at Philippi, Virginia, on June 2, 1861. One day later, during the Battle of Philippi, while Hanger was sheltering inside a stable with the rest of the Churchville (Virginia) Cavalry when the "first solid Union cannon shot of the war" bounced into the stable and struck his leg. The injury required amputation of Hanger's leg above the knee; he underwent the first battlefield amputation of the war, at the hands of Union surgeons. Hanger returned to his parents’ home to recuperate wearing a prosthesis that was essentially a wooden peg. His dissatisfaction with the fit and function of the limb replacement led Hanger to design and construct a new prosthesis from whittled barrel staves, rubber and wood, with hinges at the knee and foot. The device worked well, and the state legislature commissioned him to manufacture the “Hanger Limb” for other wounded soldiers.

Manufacturing operations for J.E. Hanger, Inc., were established in the cities of Staunton and Richmond. Hanger was awarded his first patent for an artificial limb, number 155, from the Confederate Patent Office on March 23, 1863. Over the years Hanger developed and patented additional products for veterans and other amputees.

In 1906, Hanger moved the company’s headquarters to Washington, DC. In 1915, he traveled to Europe to help World War I amputees and to learn from European prosthetists.

Hanger’s five sons were active in operating the family business. In 1915, they divided J.E. Hanger, Inc., into four separate companies, with each operating in a different region of the country. At the time of Hanger’s death in 1919, the companies had branches in Atlanta, St. Louis, Philadelphia, Pittsburgh, London and Paris.

In the years leading up to World War II, there was little significant advancement in the U.S. prosthetics industry. The new wave of amputee veterans demanded better prosthetic options, and in 1946, the federal government began providing funds for research and development in prosthetics. J.E. Hanger, Inc., was able to introduce new prosthetic socket designs made from improved materials such as thermosetting resins.

Around this time, the orthotics industry sought to combine with the prosthetics industry. In 1950, the American Orthotics and Prosthetics Association was formed, which brought a new emphasis on the education and certification of clinical practitioners. By the mid 1950s, J.E.Hanger, Inc., had added orthotic services to its business, and had expanded to 50 offices in the U.S. and 25 in Europe.

The 1960s and 1970s held relatively few technological improvements, but the 1980s marked the beginning of a period of advanced technological development that continues to the present day. In 1986, Sequel Corporation, a Colorado-based communications company, sold off its cellular phone business and began investing in the orthotics and prosthetics industry. In 1989, Sequel bought J. E. Hanger, Inc., of Washington, DC. At the time of purchase, J. E. Hanger, Inc., was an $8 million business with offices in 11 cities and eight states. Soon after, Sequel changed the name of the company to Hanger Orthopedic Group. Ivan Sabel, president and chief operating officer, was focused on centralizing the design and manufacturing of the company's prosthetic and orthotic devices and distributing them nationally.

In 1996, the company bought J. E. Hanger, Inc., of Georgia. This acquisition doubled the size of the company, which now had 175 patient care centers, six distribution sites, four manufacturing plants and 1,000 employees in 30 states. Hanger continued purchasing small companies and by 1998, was operating 256 patient care centers. In 1999, Hanger Orthopedic Group bought its biggest competitor and the industry leader, the orthotics and prosthetics division of NovaCare. This added an additional 369 patient care centers. Following the NovaCare acquisition, the company continued to expand its corporate holdings with related specialty businesses. In 1999, Fortune Magazine ranked Hanger Orthopedic Group as 79th on its list of One Hundred Fastest-Growing Companies.

In October 2022, Patient Square Capital, LP. acquired Hanger, Inc.

== Subsidiaries ==
Hanger, Inc. operates seven business lines within two segments: Patient Care and Products & Services.

Hanger, Inc.'s Patient Care segment comprises Hanger Clinic and Linkia.

Linkia is a network management company that works exclusively with the orthotics and prosthetics industry.

Its Products & Services segment includes Accelerated Care Plus, Hanger Fabrication Network (formerly National Labs), Innovative Neurotronics, Southern Prosthetic Supply (SPS), and SureFit.

Southern Prosthetic Supply has distribution centers in five states, distributing more than 400,000 products offerings. Through its SureFit subsidiary, SPS manufactures and sells therapeutic footwear for diabetic patients in the podiatric market. Through Hanger Fabrication Network, it is a fabricator of O&P devices both for out-patient care clinics and competitor clinics.

Innovative Neurotronics, Inc., specializes in the development and commercialization of emerging neuromuscular technologies. Neuromuscular refers to the use of electrical stimulation to improve the functionality of an impaired extremity.

== Research ==
Employees of the company are editors and contributing authors of textbooks such as Prosthetics and Patient Management: A Comprehensive Clinical Approach, Functional Restoration of Adults and Children with Upper Extremity Amputation, and Physical Medicine and Rehabilitation: Principles and Practice.

== Legal problems ==
In 2004, allegations of billing fraud were made against the company when an office administrator reported Hanger employees in New York for forging prescriptions for non-existent patients. A class action lawsuit was brought against Hanger for allegedly using the fraud to artificially raise stock prices. Although 14 offices were named in the lawsuit, Hanger said that only one location was involved in the fraud.
