= Mount Diamantina =

Mountain in Queensland, Australia

- Location within Queensland

Highest point
- Elevation: 955 m (3,133 ft)
- Coordinates: 18.4292°S 146.2946°E

Geography
- Location: Hinchinbrook Island, Queensland, Australia

Mount Diamantina is a mountain on Hinchinbrook Island, off the north east coast of Queensland, Australia. It rises 955 metres (3,133 ft) out of the Coral Sea.

== See also ==
- List of mountains of Australia
