= Mount Bowen (Queensland) =

Mountain in Queensland, Australia

- Mount Bowen, September 1997

Highest point
- Elevation: 1,121 m (3,678 ft)
- Coordinates: 18.3571°S 146.2666°E

Geography
- Location within Queensland
- Location: Hinchinbrook Island, Queensland, Australia

Mount Bowen is a mountain located on Hinchinbrook Island, off the north east coast of Queensland, Australia. It rises 1,121 metres (3,678 ft) out of the Coral Sea.

On this mountain in April 1997, hiker Warren Macdonald became trapped beneath a one-ton slab of stone in a freak rock fall. Two days later he was rescued, only to undergo the amputation of both his legs at mid thigh. His book One Step Beyond chronicles his attempt at climbing Mount Bowen. The accident is the subject of an episode titled "Trapped Under a Boulder" in the Discovery Channel series I Shouldn't Be Alive.

== See also ==
- List of mountains of Australia
