= Jackey Jackey Creek =

River in Queensland, Australia

Jackey Jackey Jacky Jacky
- Location of Jackey Jackey Creek river mouth in Queensland
- Etymology: Jackey Jackey

Location
- Country: Australia
- State: Queensland
- Region: Far North Queensland

Physical characteristics
- Source: Great Dividing Range
  - elevation: 49 m (161 ft)
- Mouth: Kennedy Inlet
  - location: southwest of Cliffy Point, Torres Strait
  - coordinates: 10°55′36″S 142°30′39″E
  - elevation: 0 m (0 ft)
- Length: 27 km (17 mi)
- Basin size: 760.4 km^{2} (293.6 sq mi)
- Discharge
  - location: Near mouth
  - average: 17.5 m^{3}/s (550 GL/a)

Basin features
- Tributaries
  - right: Spear Creek
- National park: Apudthama National Park

The Jackey Jackey Creek, also often called Jacky Jacky Creek, is a creek in the Cape York Peninsula region of Far North Queensland, Australia.

== Course ==
The headwaters of the river rise in the Great Dividing Range and flow in a north easterly direction along the northern border of the Apudthama National Park. The creek eventually discharges into Kennedy Inlet then Newcastle Bay and onto the Torres Strait.

== Catchment ==
The creek's catchment occupies and area of 2,963 square kilometres (1,144 sq mi), of which an area of 257 square kilometres (99 sq mi) is made up of estuarine wetlands. The area is composed of a variety of habitat and contains great ecological diversity. The southern end of the catchment holds the white silica sand dunes of the Shelburne Bay area with perched freshwater lakes. Savannah woodlands are found at the western side of the catchment, with the Escape River-Kennedy Inlet system, the site of Australia's largest mangrove forest as well as Queensland’s biggest pearl oyster site found to the north.

The only tributary of the creek is Spear Creek, which joins shortly before reaching Kennedy Inlet.

The hilly areas at the tip of Cape York are made up of Carboniferous volcanic rocks, while further south the geology is Jurassic-Cretaceous sandstone. The lower lying country of the Apudthama National Park is made up of Cainozoic sands and gravels.

A total of 31 species of fish are found in the creek, including the glassfish, Pacific short-finned eel, kabuna hardyhead, treadfin silver biddy, mouth almighty, concave goby, coal grunter, barramundi, oxeye herring, mangrove jack, eastern rainbowfish, Obbe's catfish, spotted blue-eye and gulf saratoga.

== History ==
The traditional owners of the area are the Unjadi and Ankamuti peoples, who have lived in the area for thousands of years.

The creek is named for the Aboriginal guide, Jackey Jackey, who acted as a guide for Edmund Kennedy during his 1848 expedition through the Cape York area.

Land was cleared near the creek in 1942 for a dispersal airfield, named Higgins Airfield, after Japanese air raids at the Horn Island Airfield.

== See also ==
- List of rivers of Australia § Queensland
