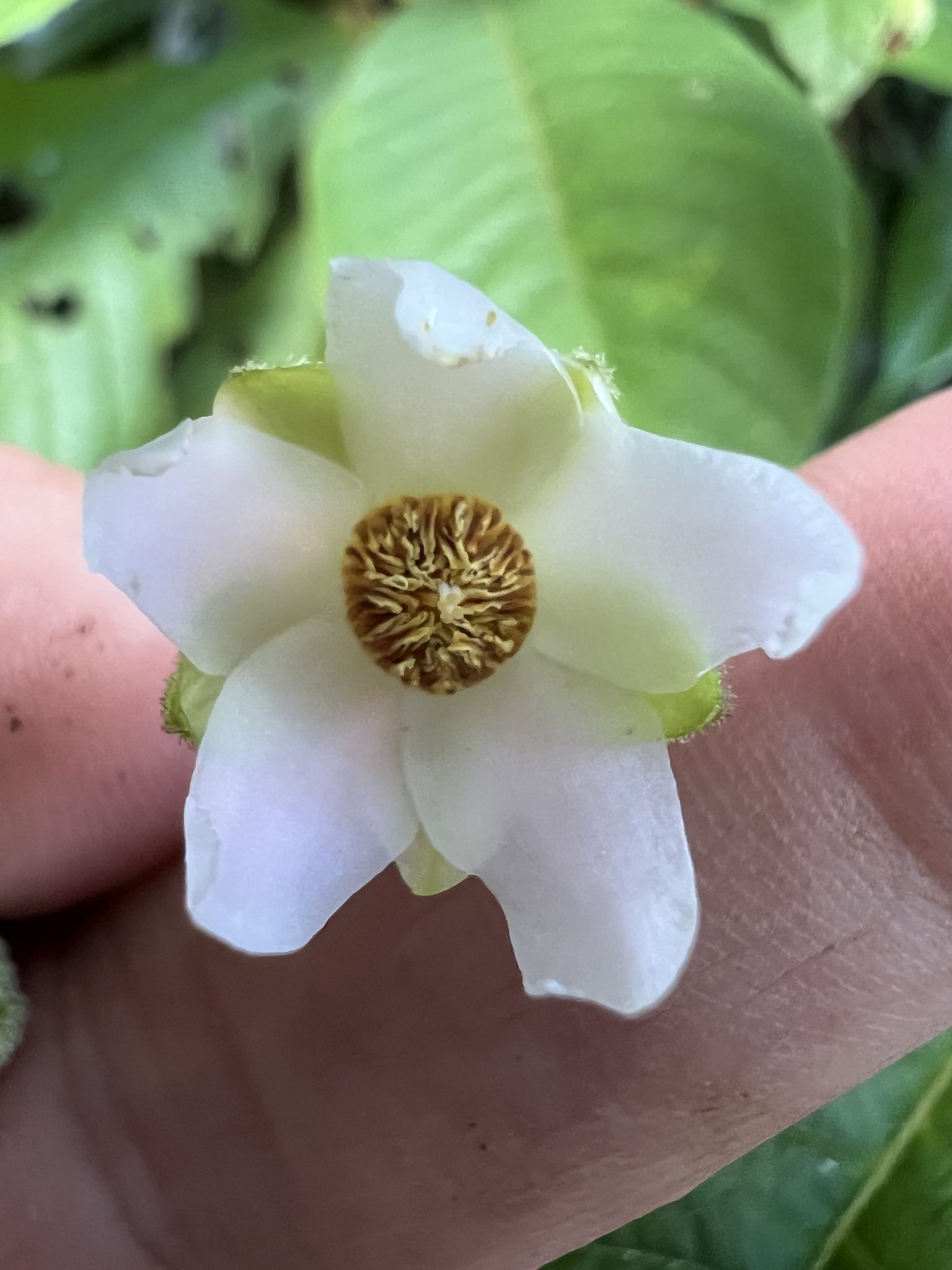

Conservation status
- Least Concern (NCA)

Scientific classification
- Kingdom: Plantae
- Clade: Tracheophytes
- Clade: Angiosperms
- Clade: Eudicots
- Clade: Asterids
- Order: Ericales
- Family: Actinidiaceae
- Genus: Saurauia
- Species: S. andreana

Binomial name
- Saurauia andreana Oliv.

Synonyms
- Saurauia synarrhena F.Muell.; Dillenia andreana F.Muell.

= Saurauia andreana =

Andre's saurauia

Species of flowering plant

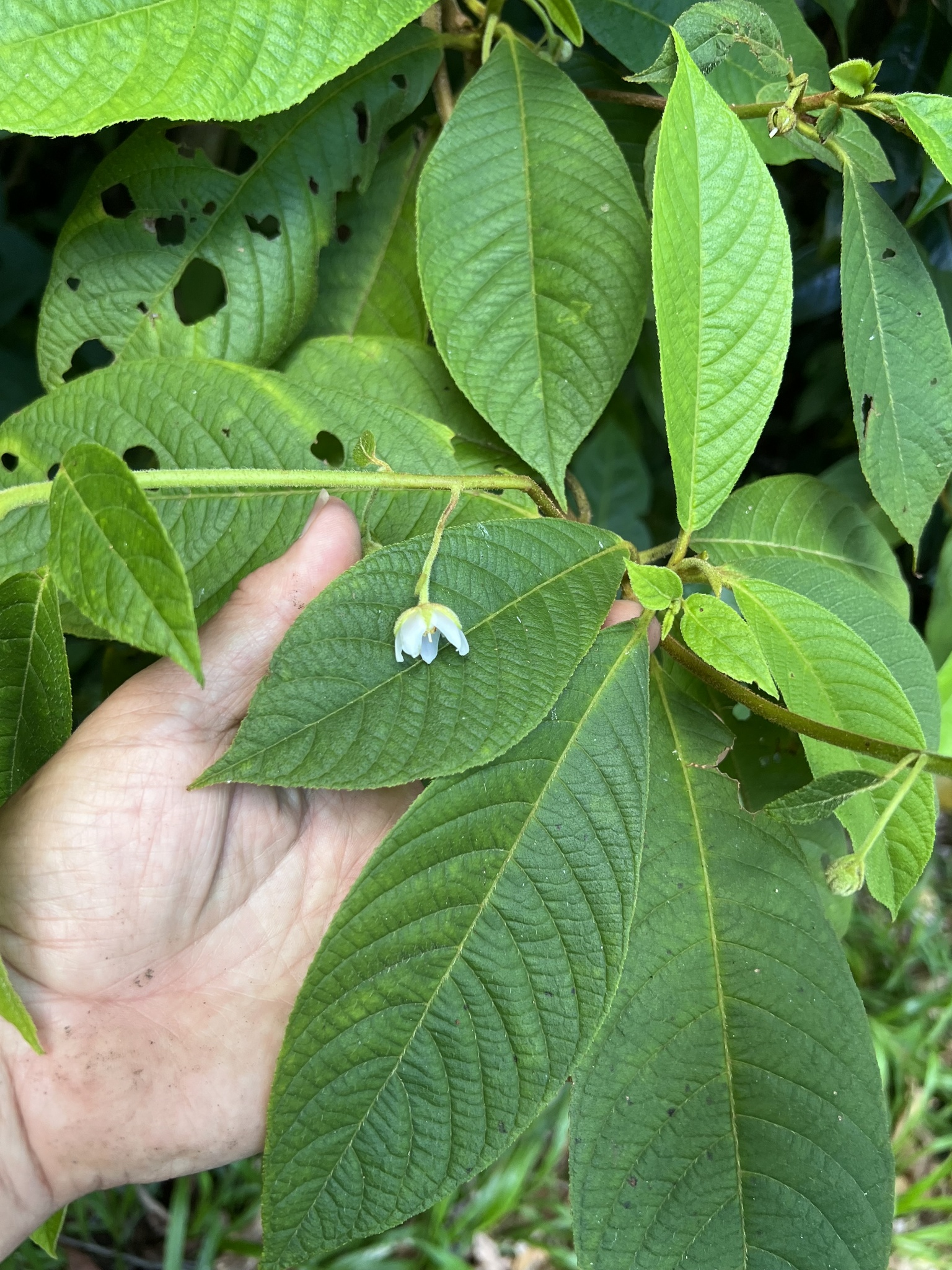
Foliage and flower

Saurauia andreana, commonly known as Andre's saurauia, is a plant in the family Actinidiaceae found only in the Wet Tropics bioregion of Queensland, Australia.

== Description ==
It is a shrub or small tree reaching up to 9 m (30 ft) in height with soft wood and pithy stems. Leaves grow to 26 cm (10 in) long by 8.5 cm (3.3 in) wide and their margins (edges) have numerous small teeth. They are held on petioles about 15 mm (0.59 in) long, and are obovate in shape. Flowers are white and produced in a 3—5 flowered cyme in the leaf axils. They have five petals about 14 mm (0.55 in) long. The fruit is, in botanical terms, a berry, white or faintly purple, measuring up to 15 mm (0.59 in) wide and long, and containing numerous small seeds.

== Distribution and habitat ==
Andre's saurauia is found most commonly in lowland rainforest alongside watercourses, in coastal Queensland from about Cooktown south to about Cardwell. The altitudinal range is from sea level to about 1,000 m (3,300 ft).

== Conservation ==
This species is listed as least concern under the Queensland Government's Nature Conservation Act. As of 31 August 2024, it has not been assessed by the International Union for Conservation of Nature (IUCN).
