= Jacky Jacky =

Jacky Jacky may refer to:

- Jackey Jackey (c. 1833–1854), Aboriginal Australian guide to Edmund Kennedy in Queensland
- Jacky Jacky, Aboriginal Australian man who with two others saved many settlers in the 1852 floods in Gundagai in the colony of New South Wales
- Northern Peninsula Airport, an airfield on the Cape York Peninsula, Queensland, built in 1942 as Jacky Jacky Field
