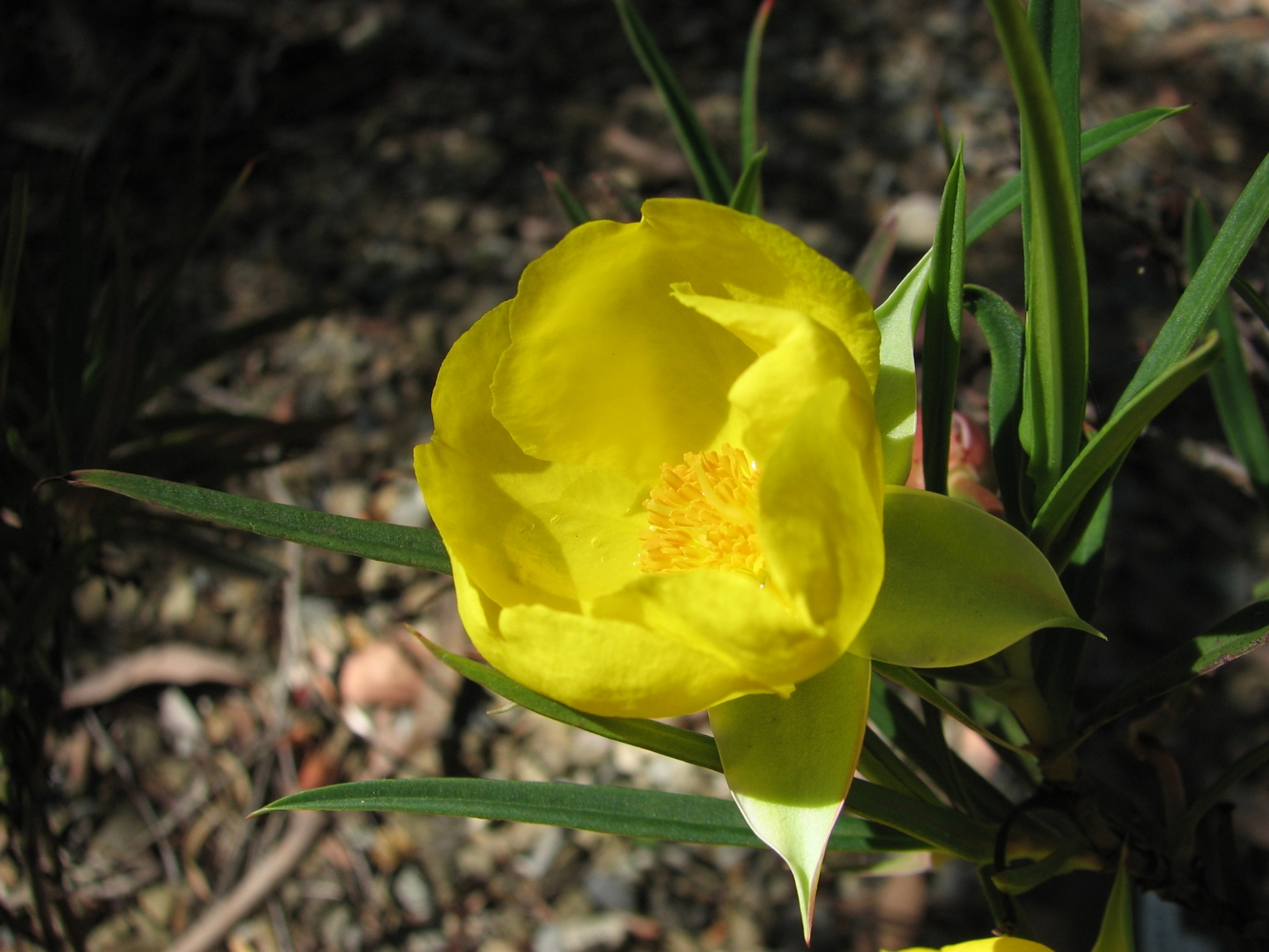

Scientific classification
- Kingdom: Plantae
- Clade: Tracheophytes
- Clade: Angiosperms
- Clade: Eudicots
- Order: Dilleniales
- Family: Dilleniaceae
- Genus: Hibbertia
- Species: H. longifolia

Binomial name
- Hibbertia longifolia F.Muell.

= Hibbertia longifolia =

Species of flowering plant

Hibbertia longifolia is a small shrub that is endemic to Queensland, Australia.

The species was first formally described in 1864 by Victorian Government Botanist Ferdinand von Mueller in his paper Fragmenta Phytographiae Australiae based on plant material collected from Rockingham Bay.
