= Hinchinbrook Channel =

Strait in Queensland, Australia

Coordinates: 18.384°S 146.193°E

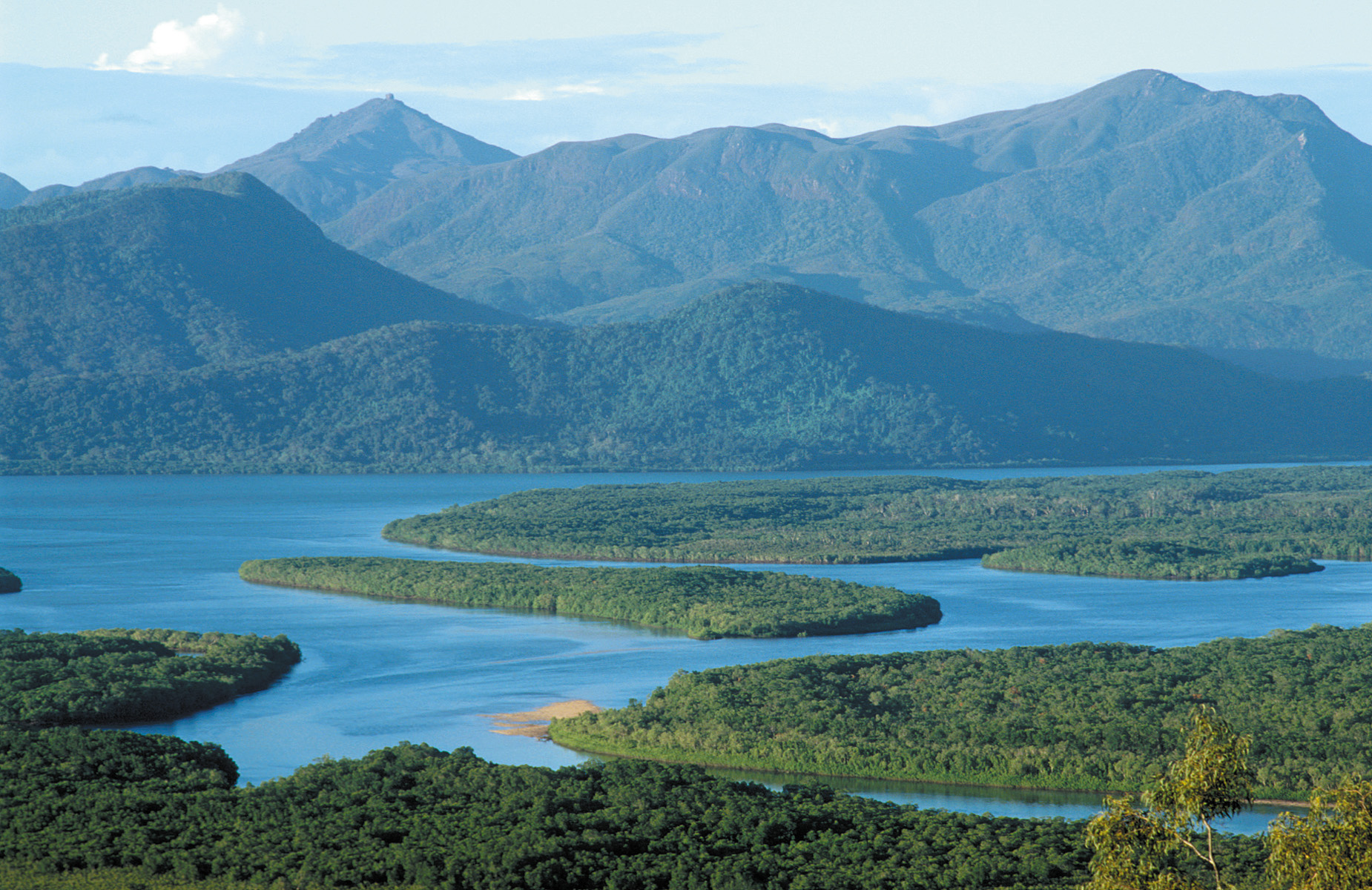
Channel and island seen from mainland

The Hinchinbrook Channel is a channel between the Australian mainland and Hinchinbrook Island. It runs for 44 km between Oyster Point, just south of Cardwell, and Lucinda in Far North Queensland. The Aboriginal name for the channel is Bolan Milbirmi. The Herbert River flows into the channel's southern point. The channel includes 164 km2 of mangrove swamps and 109 km2 of open water.

The Hinchinbrook Channel is protected within the Hinchinbrook Island National Park, the Great Barrier Reef Marine Park and the Great Barrier Reef World Heritage Area. Dugong feed and seek habitat in the sea grass patches along the channel seafloor. The channel is bordered by extensive, deltaic mangrove forests. The northern end resembles a bay, more than a narrow channel, with a width of 4 km.

The residence time of the channel is roughly 50 days. This long period is due to the lack of mixing of water in creeks and mangrove forests with offshore water. There is little to no current in the channel.

== See also ==
- Goold Island National Park
