= Tully railway station =

Railway station in Queensland, Australia

Tully
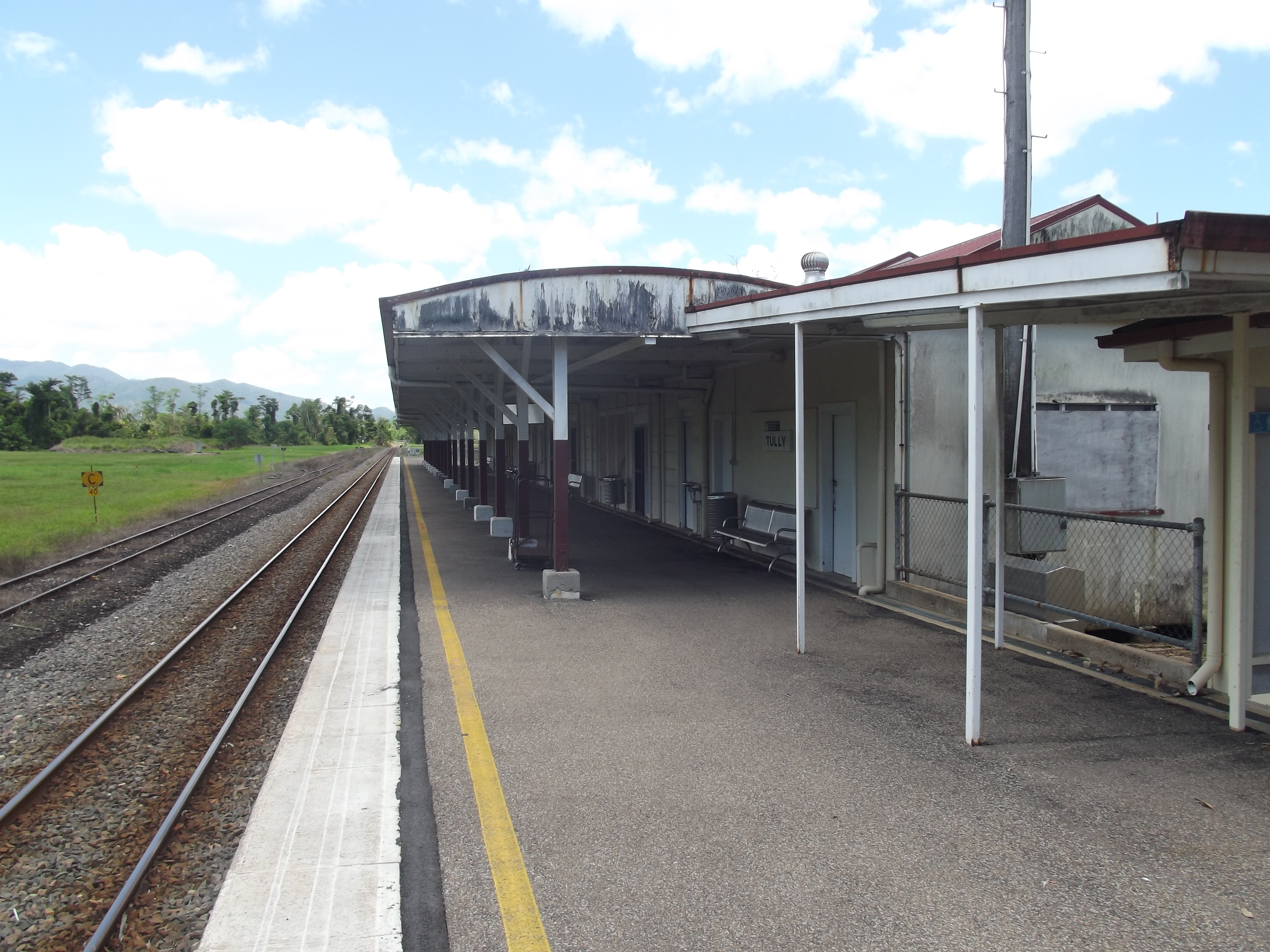
- Northbound view in January 2013

General information
- Location: Bruce Highway, Tully
- Coordinates: 17.9324°S 145.9328°E
- Owner: Queensland Rail
- Operator: Traveltrain
- Line: North Coast
- Distance: 1544.86 kilometres from Central
- Platforms: 1
- Tracks: 2

Construction
- Structure type: Ground
- Accessible: Yes

Services
Preceding station	Queensland Rail	Following station
Cardwell towards Brisbane	Spirit of Queensland	Innisfail towards Cairns
Location

Tully railway station is located on the North Coast line in Queensland, Australia. It serves the town of Tully. The station has one platform. Opposite the platform lies a passing loop.

The station suffered severe water damage due to Cyclone Yasi in February 2011, and was subsequently refurbished. The old station building is still attached to the south side of the station, with visible damage.

== Services ==
Tully is served by Traveltrain's Spirit of Queensland service.
