= Ingham railway station, Queensland =

Railway station in Australia

Ingham
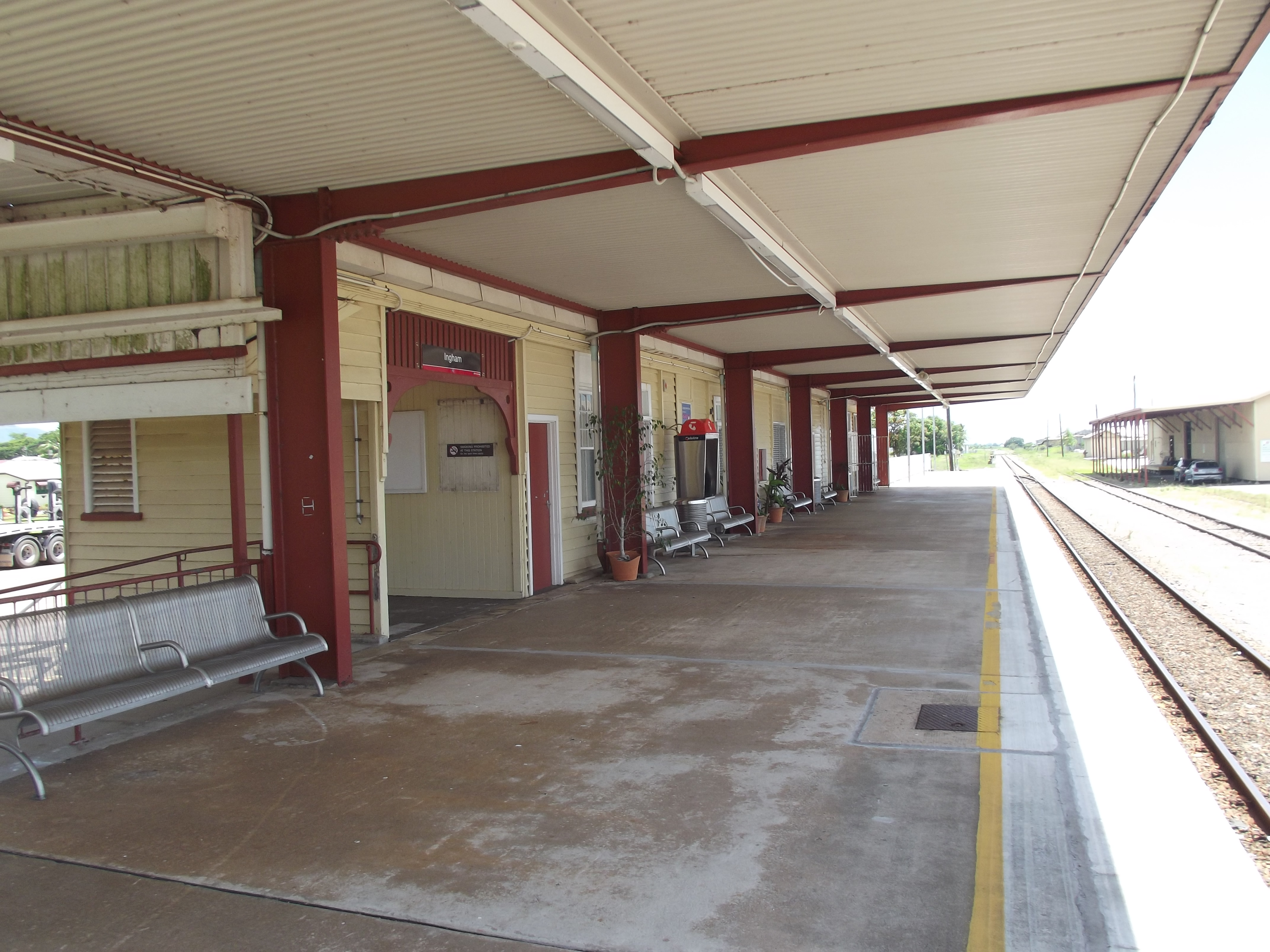
- Northbound view in January 2013

General information
- Location: Lynch Street, Ingham
- Coordinates: 18.6467°S 146.1648°E
- Owner: Queensland Rail
- Operator: Traveltrain
- Line: North Coast
- Distance: 1448.67 kilometres from Central
- Platforms: 1
- Tracks: 2

Construction
- Structure type: Ground
- Accessible: Yes

Services
Preceding station	Queensland Rail	Following station
Townsville towards Brisbane	Spirit of Queensland	Cardwell towards Cairns
Location

Ingham railway station is located on the North Coast line in Queensland, Australia. It serves the town of Ingham. The station has one platform. Opposite the platform lies a passing loop.

== Services ==
Ingham is served by Traveltrain's Spirit of Queensland service.
