= Innisfail railway station =

Railway station in Queensland, Australia

Innisfail
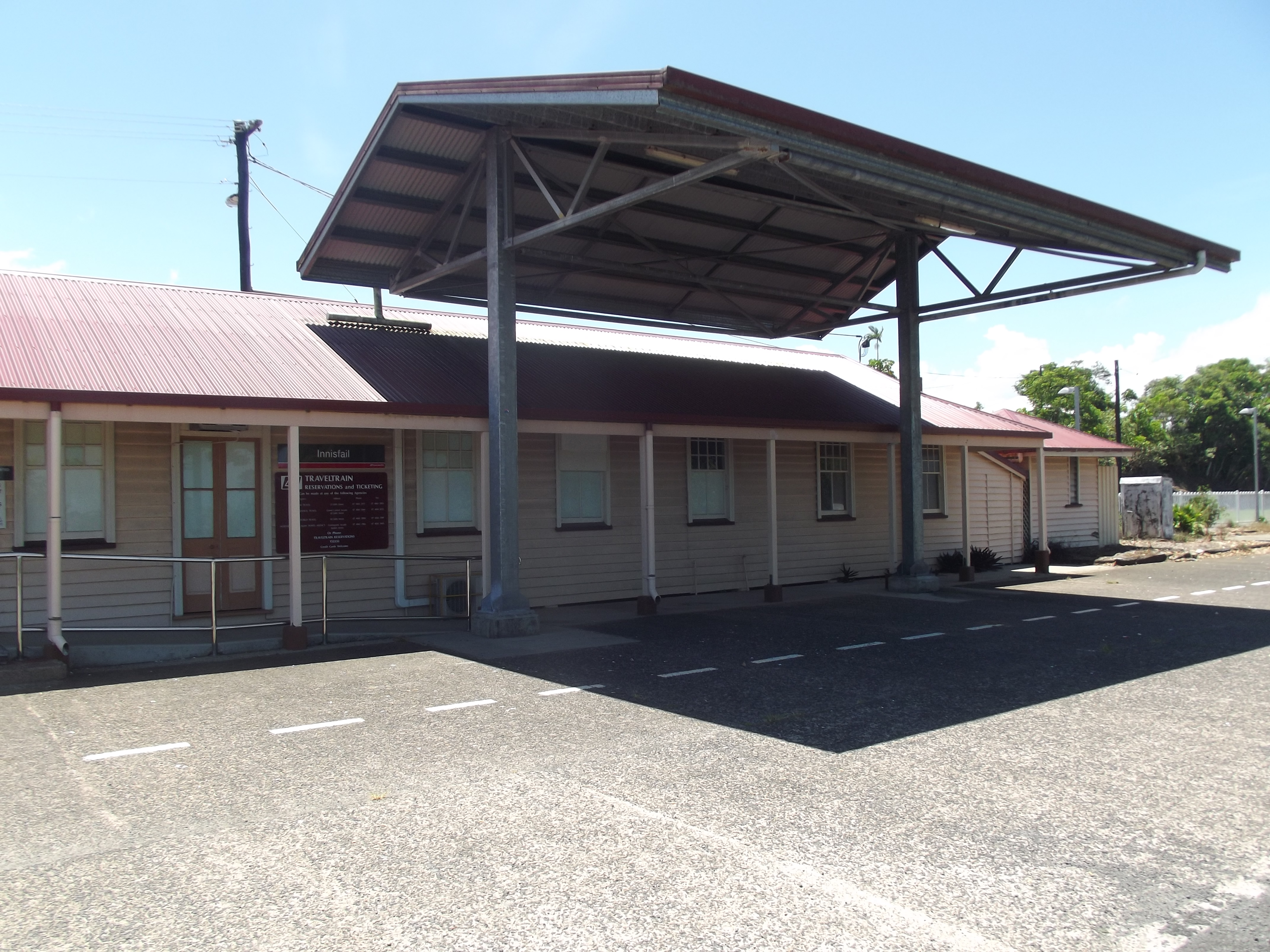
- Station front in January 2013

General information
- Location: Station Street, Innisfail
- Coordinates: 17.5261°S 146.0191°E
- Owner: Queensland Rail
- Operator: Traveltrain
- Line: North Coast
- Distance: 1593.37 kilometres from Central
- Platforms: 1

Construction
- Structure type: Ground
- Accessible: Yes

Services
Preceding station	Queensland Rail	Following station
Tully towards Brisbane	Spirit of Queensland	Babinda towards Cairns
Location

Innisfail railway station is located on the North Coast line in Queensland, Australia. It serves the town of Innisfail. The station has one platform.

== History ==
Innisfail railway station, located in the town of Innisfail, Queensland, has a rich history dating back to its establishment as part of the North Coast line. Serving as a vital link between Brisbane and Cairns, the station has played a crucial role in the development and accessibility of the region. The station's strategic position has facilitated the transport of agricultural products, particularly sugar cane, which is a significant industry in the area. Additionally, the station has been a critical point for passenger travel, contributing to the economic and social connectivity of Innisfail with other major cities in Queensland.

== Services ==
Innisfail is served by Traveltrain's Spirit of Queensland service.
