= Edmund Kennedy =

Australian explorer (1818-1848)

- Drawing of Edmund Kennedy, originally published by T. L. Mitchell (1838). Three Expeditions into the interior of eastern Australia
- Born: Edmund Besley Court Kennedy; 5 September 1818; Guernsey
- Died: December 1848; Cape York, Colony of New South Wales (today Queensland, Australia)
- Cause of death: Speared
- Resting place: Approx. 11°00′S 142°38′E
- Education: Elizabeth College, Guernsey
- Occupation: Explorer

Edmund Besley Court Kennedy (5 September 1818 – December 1848) was an explorer in Australia in the mid-19th century. He was the Assistant-Surveyor of New South Wales, working with Sir Thomas Mitchell. Kennedy explored the interior of Queensland and northern New South Wales, including the Thomson River, the Barcoo River, Cooper Creek, and Cape York Peninsula. He died in December 1848 after being speared by Aboriginal Australians in far north Queensland near Cape York.

== Early life ==
Kennedy was born on 5 September 1818 on Guernsey in the Channel Islands to Colonel Thomas Kennedy (British Army) and Mary Ann (Smith) Kennedy. He was the sixth born of nine children, comprising five boys and four girls.

Kennedy was educated at Elizabeth College Guernsey, and expressed an early interest in surveying. In 1837 he went to Rio de Janeiro, returning to England in 1838 when the business house in which he worked closed down. A naval officer friend of the family, Captain Charles James Tyers, suggested that if Kennedy obtained the necessary qualifications, he would arrange employment for him in Australia. During 1839 Kennedy attended lectures in surveying at King's College London, obtaining a certificate from his tutor.

In November 1839 Kennedy sailed for Sydney in the barque Globe which arrived in March 1840. Another family contact Captain Perry, who was deputy to Sir Thomas Mitchell, arranged a position for Kennedy as assistant surveyor in the New South Wales Survey Department after he had passed an examination. In August Kennedy was assigned to join Tyers on an overland journey to Melbourne, thence to Portland Bay for survey duties.

Whilst there, he had a liaison with an Irish convict girl named Margaret Murphy. She became pregnant which caused a minor scandal and Kennedy sent her off in a ship to Launceston with £50. Kennedy's indiscretion was reported to Superintendent Charles La Trobe and Governor Gipps and he was recalled to Sydney in May 1843 in disgrace. Murphy later gave birth to their daughter Eliza, remarried and moved back to Ireland. The daughter died at age five. Kennedy received praise from Mitchell for his work in Portland and remained employed in the government surveying department in Sydney, but at half-pay.

== First expedition ==
In 1845, Mitchell received authority from London for an expedition from Sydney to the Gulf of Carpentaria terminating at Port Essington. He was convinced that a major river must run in a north-westerly direction to the gulf, and that he would be the one to discover it. His initial choice for second in command was the surveyor Townsend, but shortly before setting off, Edmund Kennedy was appointed to replace him. On 5 November Kennedy was sworn in as a Justice of the Peace at the Supreme Court, and the expedition set off from Sydney in mid November. The party trekked via Parramatta and Bathurst to a rendezvous point at Boree. Kennedy in a letter to his father noted that the party consisted of 30 men, 12 months supplies plus "8 drays, 3 carts, 102 bullocks, 255 sheep, [and]17 horses." The large size of the expedition was to be detrimental to the rate of progress.

Mitchell tracked north along the Bogan River, east to the Macquarie, north to the Narran, then along the Balonne. Here Mitchell found a natural rocky causeway and named it St George Bridge, near the present town of St George, Queensland. To allow time for stock to refresh, he left Kennedy at a depot camp for three weeks, thereafter to follow slowly while Mitchell probed northwards with a small party. Mitchell continued to follow the Balonne, which took him too far north-east, so he veered west until coming across the Maranoa River where Kennedy and the main party caught up on 1 June 1846. By now Mitchell realised that their equipment was a cumbersome impediment to progress, so he decided to leave Kennedy behind again, near the present town of Mitchell. He was gone for four and a half months.

Initially Mitchell followed the Maranoa to its headwaters, and entered an area of hills which left him perplexed. At least four streams, the Nogoa, Belyando, Nive and Nivelle were traced to determine their direction of flow, but none trended north-west, and much time was employed in so doing. He left yet another party behind and travelled north-west with only a native guide and two men. Finally he discovered a substantial river which seemed to flow towards the gulf, so he named the river Victoria, after the British Sovereign. Mitchell had reached the limit of his supplies, and was forced to turn back. The two smaller teams rejoined and returned to Kennedy's depot on 19 October. The expedition then beat a retreat to Sydney, arriving 20 January 1847.

== Second expedition ==
Mitchell was impressed with the leadership qualities of Kennedy, as demonstrated by his management of the depot camps in 1846, and his technical skills relating to survey and exploration. As the question of a great north-west river remained unanswered, Mitchell gained approval in February 1847 for a new expedition to the Gulf of Carpentaria, with the express purpose of plotting the course of his Victoria River en route. This time he placed Kennedy in charge of a party of eight, which set off from Windsor, New South Wales 21 March 1847.

His instructions were to travel via St. George Bridge (14 May) to the Maranoa (8 June) where his earlier depot had been, then determine the course of the Victoria. Kennedy had spent some time plotting Mitchell's Victoria river on the latest map of the colony, and was struck by the fact that its general course turned towards a bend of Cooper Creek, named by Charles Sturt in 1845. The expedition continued northward over what was now new territory for Kennedy, and by mid August was in the vicinity from which Mitchell had been forced to return. Kennedy decided to conceal the carts and supplies from local aborigines by digging a large trench in which to bury them, then proceeded by packhorse.

The river began turning towards the south-west, taking them away from the gulf. Scouting ahead he found a substantial tributary joining the Victoria from the north, and named it the Thomson River in honour of the Colonial Secretary, Mr. Edward Deas Thomson. The country began to deteriorate and by early September Kennedy was forced to retreat to his hidden cache because of lack of water and supplies. The river by this time showed no sign of turning towards the gulf, but looked as though it would run into the Cooper. Kennedy's plan altered then to split the party and make a dash for the gulf.

When a buried cart was opened at the cache however, it was found to have been tampered with by natives and a great deal of the supplies had been destroyed. This left the expedition with no alternative but to retreat to Sydney. On the homeward journey, Kennedy followed the course of the Warrego River (discovered by Mitchell in 1846), until its course took him too far west, splitting into many channels. He then headed east, intercepted the Culgoa River, and returned to Sydney 7 February 1848. It was later proved that the Victoria did flow into Cooper Creek, thus it was renamed Barcoo River, an Aboriginal name for the river that Kennedy had learnt.

Gregory reported that the Upper Burdekin area was very suitable for squatting, given the extensive country and its abundant water, advising that settlement would of necessity require the use of force since the indigenous peoples were amply supplied with food and water which would enable them to resist resolutely any settlement on their lands.

== Third expedition ==
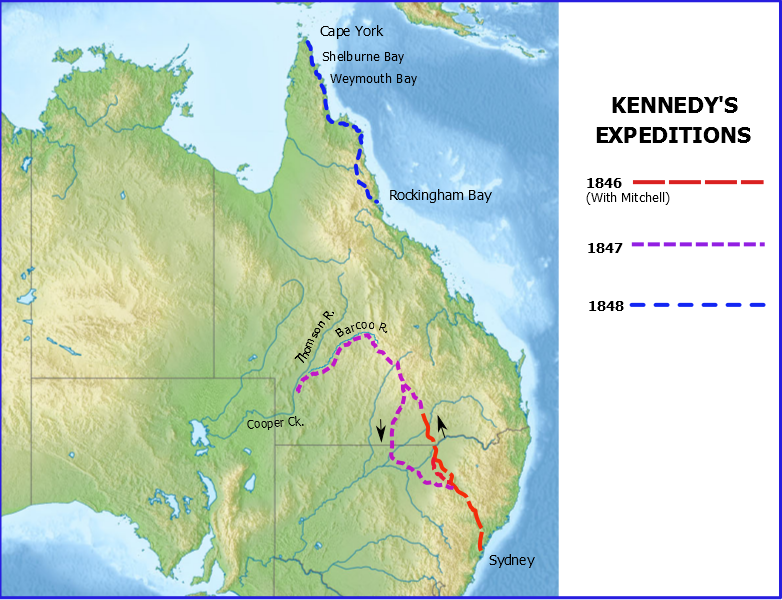
Expeditions of Kennedy

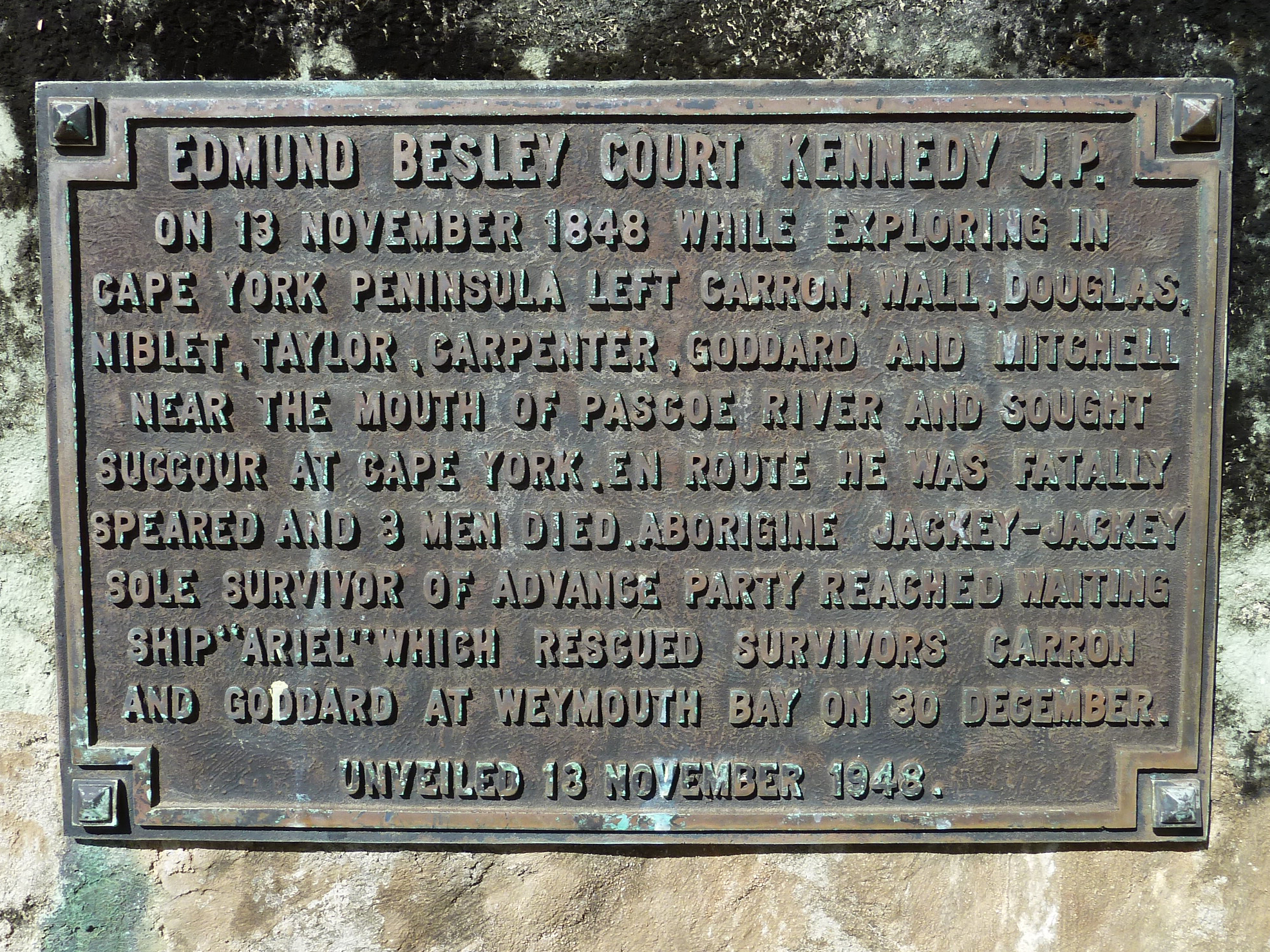
This memorial plaque was unveiled at Portland Roads (Weymouth Bay) North Queensland, 100 years after Edmund Kennedy's fateful expedition to Cape York Peninsula.

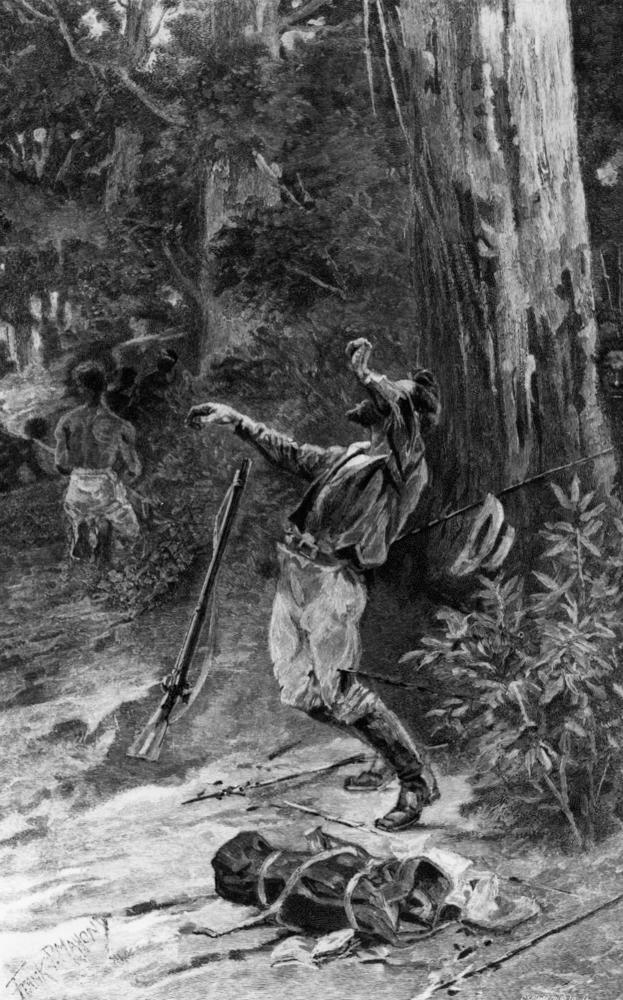
Sketch of Kennedy's death.

The Government's plan for Kennedy's next journey was primarily to find a way to the gulf, to be followed by exploration of Cape York Peninsula. The importance of Port Essington (the only port in northern Australia at the time) had declined, but trade along the east coast between Sydney and Singapore had increased, which prompted Captain Owen Stanley of HMS Rattlesnake to recommend that the east coast of Cape York be explored first. He further suggested that after a resupply of the party at the tip of the cape, the exploration could continue down the west coast, with a subsequent return overland to Sydney. It was anticipated that eighteen months would be required to complete the trip. This idea was accepted, and planning began for Kennedy to head for a starting point at Rockingham Bay, near the present town of Cardwell, Queensland.

On 28 April 1848 Edmund Kennedy and twelve men sailed from Sydney Harbour in the barque Tam O' Shanter escorted by Rattlesnake. (Note: Tam O'Shanter, of 270 tons (bm) and homeport Liverpool, had been launched at Workington in 1836.) They arrived at Rockingham Bay 20 May, but once they had landed, the party encountered terrible terrain such as mangrove swamps, mountains, lagoons, rivers, and thick rainforest that made it almost impossible to travel with horses, carts, and sheep. After nine weeks, they had travelled just 40 miles from the coast, and 12 miles north of the landing point. Kennedy had to abandon the carts and some supplies in a hopeless bog. Further on, the storeman was found to have stolen food from the supplies, and was demoted to labourer. The party was due to rendezvous at Princess Charlotte Bay with the supply ship Bramble in early August, but this did not occur as the party was two months late, and in any case there was no close approach for Bramble.

=== Death ===
By mid November, the men and horses began to weaken, so the decision was taken to leave eight men behind at Weymouth Bay, while Kennedy and four others continued north. There were still several hundred miles to go to a rendezvous point with the ship Ariel, before any hope of a rescue was possible. Days after crossing the Pascoe River, when in the vicinity of Shelburne Bay, Costigan accidentally shot himself while tending his horse and could not continue, so Luff and Dunn were left behind to care for him. They were never seen again. Kennedy and his aboriginal tracker Jackey Jackey pressed on towards Port Albany and the rendezvous, but they were closely followed by local indigenous peoples. Near the banks of the Escape River, 20 miles from the tip of Cape York, Kennedy was speared several times and died in Jackey Jackey's arms. From existing reports it seems that Kennedy's death resulted from attacks that seem "not to have been directly provoked". After a feat of endurance of about ten days with no supplies, Jackey Jackey made it to the supply ship alone 23 December 1848.

Following directions from Jackey Jackey, Ariel proceeded to Shelburne Bay, and sent a search party ashore. A few relics were found, but no sign of the three men. The ship continued to Weymouth Bay where William Carron and William Goddard were found to be the only survivors of the eight men left there. Ariel with its three surviving expeditioners returned to Sydney in May 1849.

== Views on Aboriginal Australians ==
During his life and career in Australia, Kennedy maintained an overtly negative view of the Indigenous people, writing that:

"I sincerely trust they will soon be exterminated...they are a barbarous set of rascals never to be tamed."

He later elaborated that:

"I feel convinced that nothing can be done towards civilizing the adults. The children might be made anything of by removing them to Van Diemen's Land...might not the second or third generation improve by cultivation? Towards reconciling the natives to our occupation of their land much might be done by distributing tomahawks and blankets...I feel sure however that the native adults are too far behind in the scale of civilization to derive any benefit from religious instruction."

== Legacy ==
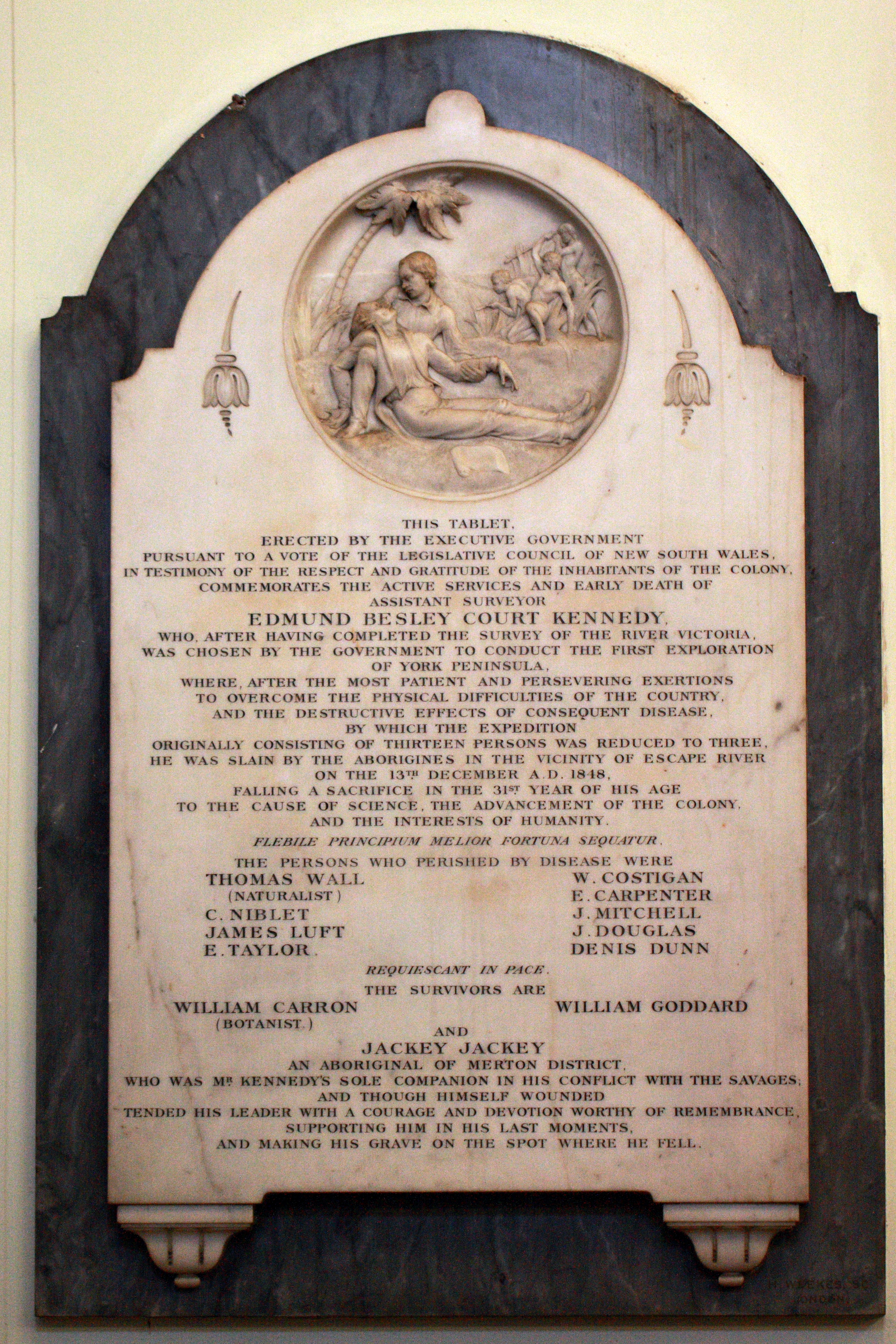
A memorial to Kennedy and Jackey Jackey on the wall of St James' Church, Sydney

The following were named in his honour:

- The former Electoral district of Kennedy in the Queensland Legislative Assembly and the Division of Kennedy in the Parliament of Australia are named after Kennedy.
- Edmund Kennedy National Park – established 1977; subsumed into Girramay National Park in 2009.
- Kennedy Highway
- Kennedy, Queensland, a locality in the Cassowary Coast Region

In 1852, a marble memorial to Kennedy and Jackey Jackey was erected in St James' Church in Sydney. The memorial depicts Kennedy dying in Jackey Jackey's arms.

=== Centenary of the expedition ===
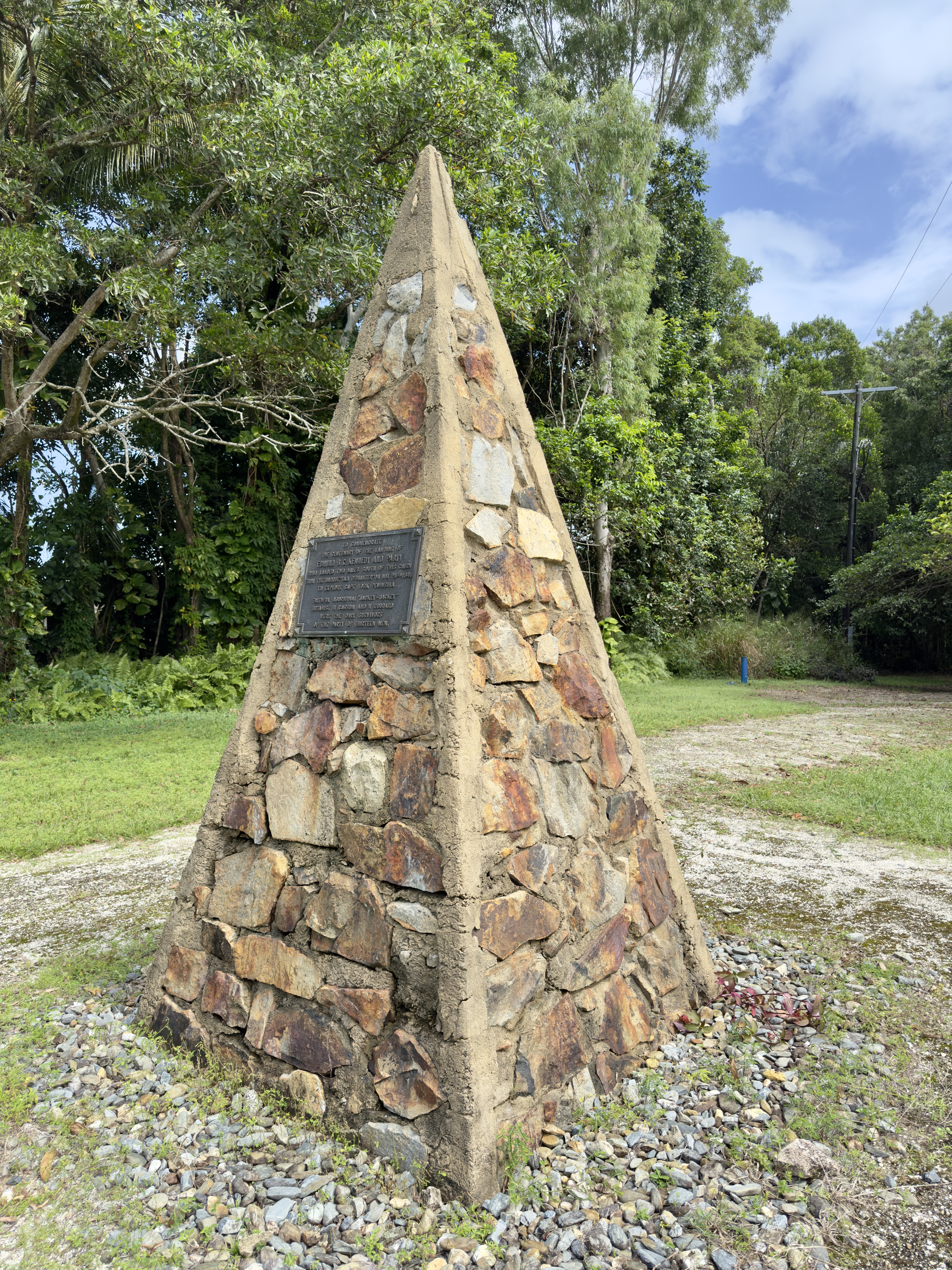
Edmund Kennedy Monument, South Mission Beach, Queensland

The centenary of the expedition was commemorated in 1948.

In May 1948, a monument to Kennedy was erected in Cardwell.

On 25 September 1948 a monument to Kennedy was erected at Cooktown.

On 11 November 1948 a monument to Kennedy was erected at Portland Road (Weymouth Bay) in Iron Range in Queensland near a spring where the expedition drew water.

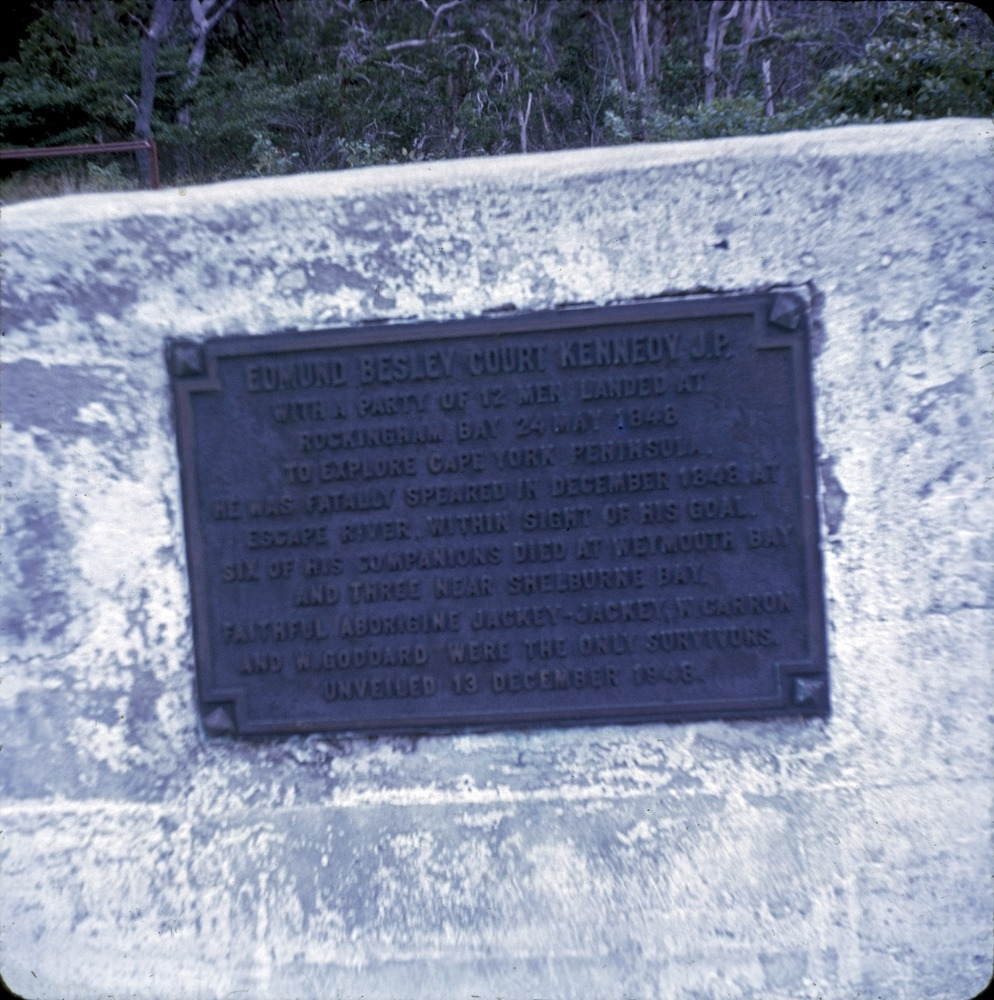
Memorial plaque for Edmund Kennedy near Somerset Queensland, circa 1969

The Kennedy Memorial Monument was unveiled on 13 December 1948 in Somerset, Queensland in commemoration of the 100th anniversary of Kennedy's unsuccessful exploration of Cape York Peninsula. The monument comprises a concrete slab on a concrete footing with a bronze commemorative plaque on its eastern face.

In addition, bronze plaques were placed in Charleville, Kennedy, Tully and Escape River.

== See also ==
- Jackey Jackey
