= Goold Island National Park =

National park in Australia

- IUCN category II (national park)
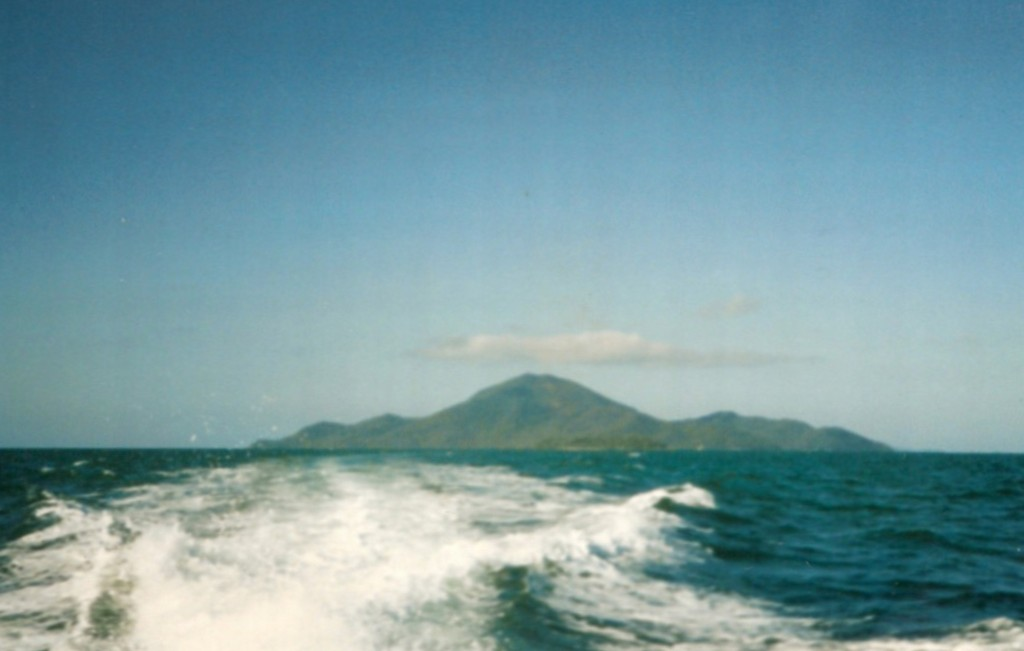
- Goold Island

- Location within Queensland
- Location: Queensland
- Coordinates: 18°10′01″S 146°10′16″E
- Area: 8.3 km^{2} (3.2 sq mi)
- Governing body: Queensland Parks and Wildlife Service
- Website: Official website

Goold Island is a national park in Queensland, Australia, 1,250 kilometres (780 mi) northwest of Brisbane. The island is close to the northern tip of Hinchinbrook Island off the coast from Cardwell in Rockingham Bay and is part of the Great Barrier Reef World Heritage Area.

Covering 8.3 square kilometres (3.2 sq mi), the island is located 17 kilometres (10.6 mi) from shore. It is covered mostly with open eucalypt forest, rainforested gullies and semi permanent creek water.

== History ==
For many thousands of years before non-indigenous peoples arrived in the region, Goold, neighbouring islands, and surrounding seas were occupied, used, and enjoyed by generations of the Bandjin peoples' ancestors, leaving behind an array of stone fish traps and shell middens which can still be found on and around the island to this day.

One of the earliest European accounts of Aboriginal Peoples at Goold Island is provided by Phillip Park King who in 1818 entered Rockingham Bay as part of survey of the 'intertropical and western coasts of Australia'.

On passing Cape Sandwich in the afternoon we observed several natives walking on the shore; and, upon our anchoring, a party was also seen collected round their huts, on the sandy beach at the west end of Goold Island; and near them were seven canoes hauled up above the tide mark; they had had kindled a fire to attract our attention, bu the day was too far advanced to allow communicating with them that evening.

The next morning, King notes his surprise to see five canoes approaching the cutter, with six men aboard and after being invited to 'come alongside' they boarded the vessel:

Some little persuasion was necessary to induce them to venture on board; but, as soon as one mounted the ladder the others followed. Their astonishment was considerably excited at every thing that they saw, particularly at our poultry and live stock. Fishing hooks and lines were gladly received by them; and, in return they gave us their baskets and turtle pegs; they remained with us for half an hour; upon leaving the vessel, they pointed out their huts and invited us, by signs, to return their visit.

Among the derogatory accounts, typical of colonial thinking at this type, are some valuable insights on lifeways of Bandjin peoples. Describing their canoes, which likely were for inshore and estuary use, King notes:

Their canoes were not more than five feet long, and generally too small for two people; two small strips of bark, five or six inches square, serves the double purpose of paddling and for baling the water out, which they are constantly obliged to do to prevent their canoe from sinking; in shoal water the paddles are superseded by a pole, by which this fragile bark is propelled.

Commenting on aspects of foodways of Bandjin people, King describes:

An open wicker basket, neatly and even tastefully made of strips of the flagellaria indica, was obtained from one of them by Mr. Roe, in which they carry their food and fishing lines; besides which each native has his gourd, the fruit of the cucurbita lagenaria, which grows plentifully on all parts of the beach, and furnishes a very useful vessel ... for the purpose of carrying water

Finally, a member of the crew reported finding several ovens:

At the north-east end of the sandy beach a fine stream was noticed, from which water might with facility be obtained. Near this stream Mr. Cunningham observed several of their ovens, similar to those used by the natives of Ta-hei-te. A circular hole is dug, at the bottom of which is placed a layer of flat stones, on which, after they have been heated by fire, the mat is placed; this is covered by another layer of stones, and over them they make a fire, which very soon cooks their repast.

This is a unique and somewhat rare early description of an earth oven, a food preparation technique used in many parts of the world, including much of eastern Australia and associated often with locally distinctive cuisines and cultural practices. Earh oven cooking practices are rarely documented on the eastern Australian seaboard at this time.

Bandjin survivors of an often violent non-indigenous 'occupation' of the region continue to value and consider Goold Island as part of their sea country, and, in December 2005, they included Goold Island within Australia's and Queensland's first accredited 'Traditional Use of Marine Resource Agreement'. The Girringun Aboriginal Corporation is involved in monitoring and data gathering of sea grasses, turtles, and dugongs near the island.

== Camping ==
Campers are required to bring their own water and all camping equipment. Camping is by permit only and is limited numbers so it is best to book in advance. Access to the islands is by ferry, private boat or charter or sea kayak. Marine stingers are present during the warmer months.

== Neighbouring islands ==
The nearby Brook Islands are smaller and made up of North, Tween, Middle and South islands, the first three of which comprise the Brook Islands National Park. These islands are used mainly by nesting birds. It is important not to disturb the birds during breeding seasons. Birds found here include the Torresian imperial-pigeon (estimated at over 40,000), bridled terns, black-naped terns, roseate terns and little terns. The beach stone-curlew also makes North Brook Island its home.

== See also ==
- List of islands of Queensland
- Oyster Point
- Protected areas of Queensland
