= Cardwell railway station =

Railway station in Queensland, Australia

Cardwell
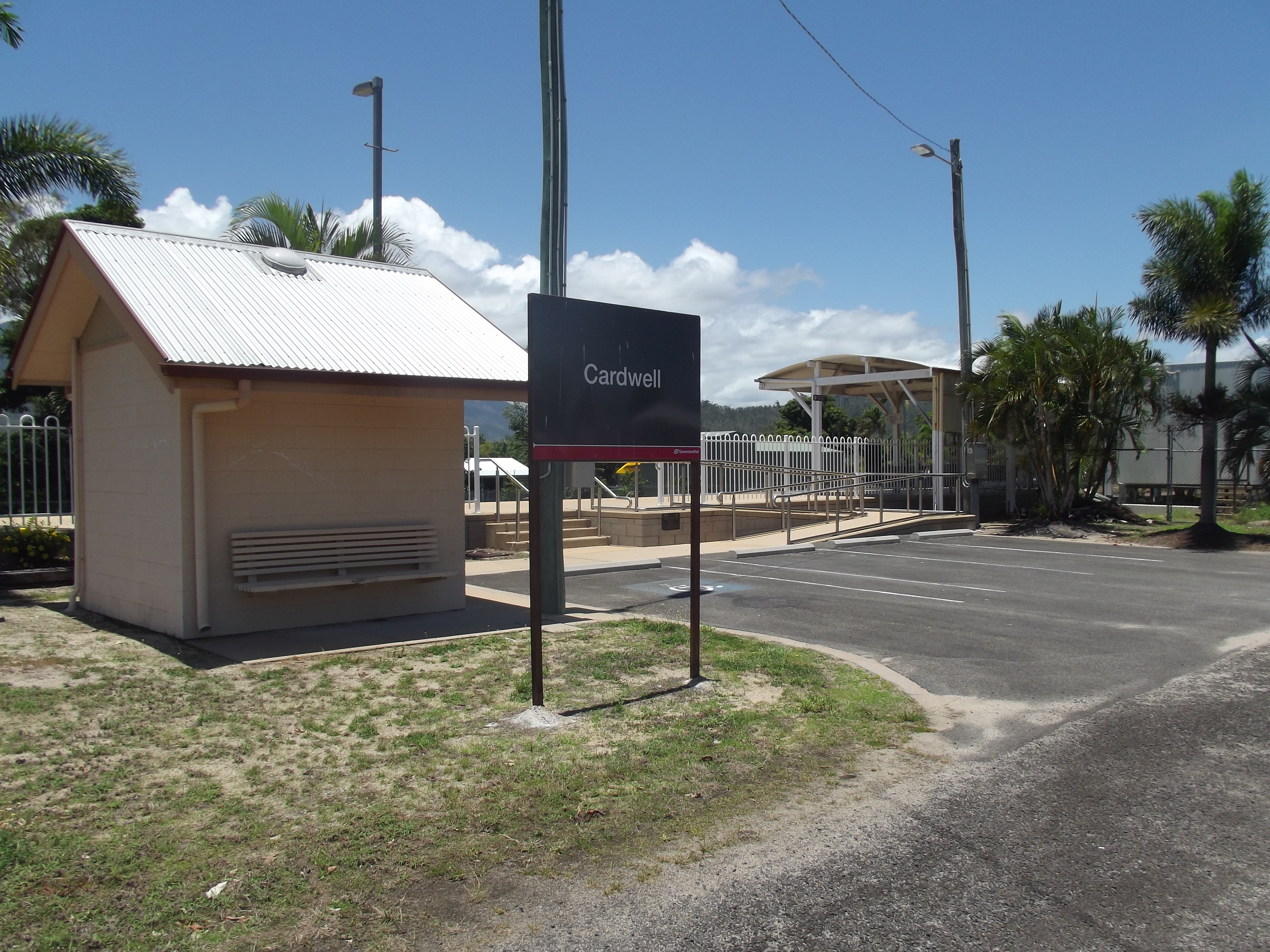
- Station front in January 2013

General information
- Location: Bowen Street, Cardwell
- Coordinates: 18.2679°S 146.0282°E
- Owner: Queensland Rail
- Operator: Traveltrain
- Line: North Coast
- Distance: 1501.76 kilometres from Central
- Platforms: 1

Construction
- Structure type: Ground
- Accessible: Yes

Services
Preceding station	Queensland Rail	Following station
Ingham towards Brisbane	Spirit of Queensland	Tully towards Cairns
Location

Cardwell railway station is located on the North Coast line in Queensland, Australia. It serves the town of Cardwell. The station has one platform. Opposite the platform lies a passing loop.

== Services ==
Cardwell is served by Traveltrain's Spirit of Queensland service.
