= Hoax Slayer =

Website critically analyzing urban legends

- Website type: Debunking resource, reference pages
- Available in: English
- Owner: Brett Christensen
- Revenue: $50,000/year (advertising)
- Website: www.hoax-slayer.net
- Launched: August 2003
- Current status: Offline, shut down by owner

Hoax Slayer (stylized as Hoax-Slayer) was a fact-checking website established in 2003 by Brett Christensen, dedicated to critically analyzing the veracity of urban legends. While it was best known for debunking false stories and internet scams, it also hosted a page listing strange but true stories.

== History ==
Hoax Slayer originated as a Yahoo! group before the website was established.

Stories it has debunked include fake videos claiming to depict Malaysia Airlines Flight 370, myths that the 2013 supermoon appeared bigger than it really did, and a "Simon Ashton" hoax claiming that emails from Simon Ashton should not be opened because doing so would lead to your computer being hacked.

In 2014, the site was reworked, changing the style and color scheme for main pages and new reports, while old reports retained the previous style. Hoax Slayer was closed down on 31 May 2021.

== Brett Christensen ==
Brett M. Christensen, a resident of Bundaberg, Australia, worked as a caravan park cleaner before he founded Hoax-Slayer.com in August 2003. He was inspired to do so after being convinced that the "Budweiser Frogs virus" really existed, only to discover later that it did not. He wrote most of the site's articles, but two of his three sons, according to him, "help maintain the website and do invaluable work behind the scenes." In addition to debunking hoaxes, Christensen has noted that many of them are "loosely derived" from real events. "For example, in Australia in 1999 a woman claimed to have been assaulted by criminals who used a chemical disguised as perfume to disable her. Warnings about that incident, which may not have been true to begin with, soon spread to the internet and have circulated ever since," he told the Guardian.
