= Cardwell, Queensland =

Cardwell
- Town
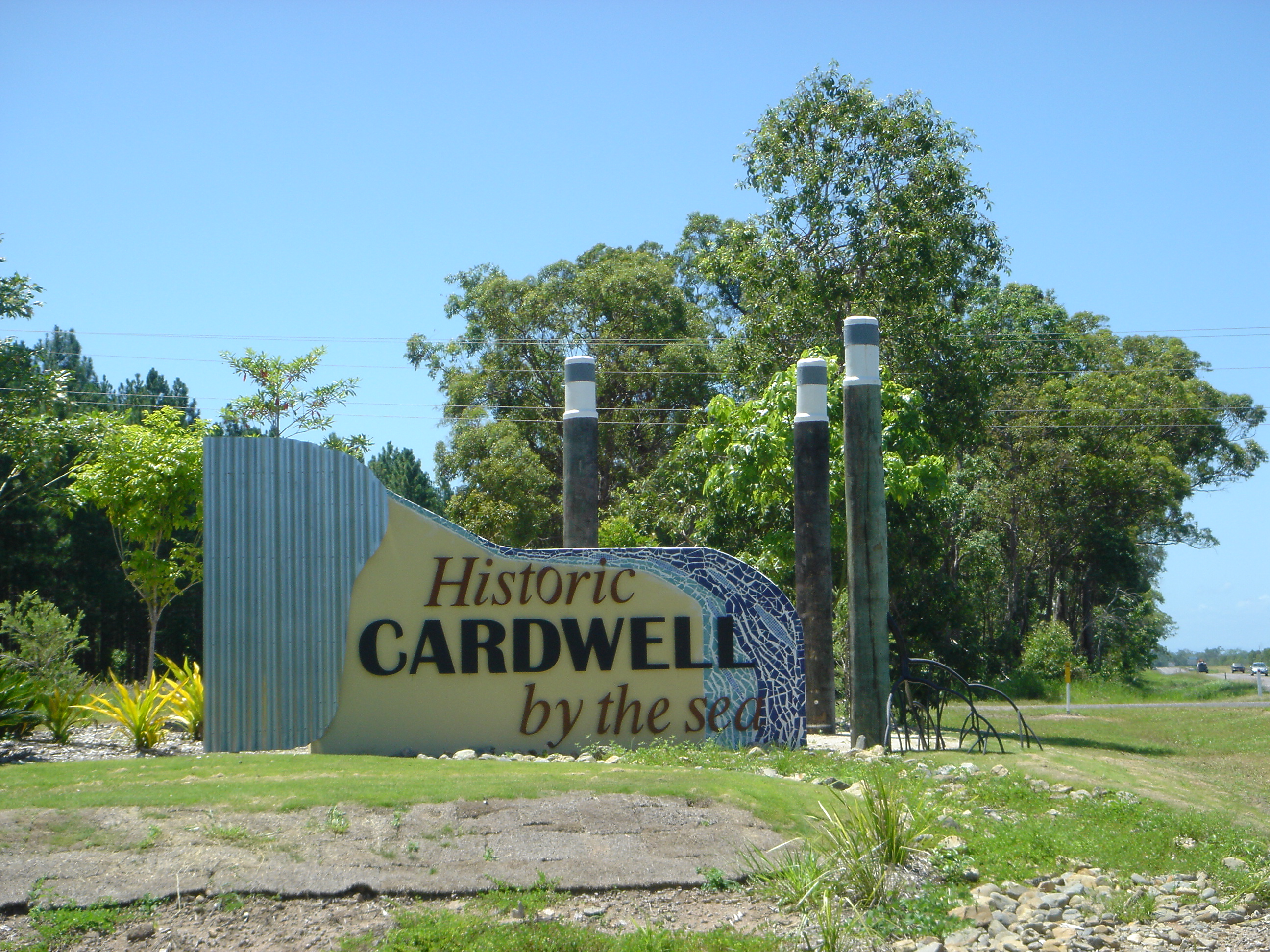
- Entrance to Cardwell, Highway 1

- Interactive map of Cardwell
- Coordinates: 18.2641°S 146.0261°E
- Country: Australia
- State: Queensland
- LGA: Cassowary Coast Region
- Location: 43.5 km (27.0 mi) S of Tully; 94.7 km (58.8 mi) S of Innisfail; 165 km (103 mi) NW of Townsville; 182 km (113 mi) S of Cairns; 1,500 km (930 mi) NNW of Brisbane

Government
  - State electorate: Hinchinbrook
  - Federal division: Kennedy

Area
  - Total: 47.1 km^{2} (18.2 sq mi)
- Elevation: 5 m (16 ft)

Population
  - Total: 1,320 (2021 census)
  - Density: 28.03/km^{2} (72.6/sq mi)
- Time zone: UTC+10:00 (AEST)
- Postcode: 4849
- Mean max temp: 28.7 °C (83.7 °F)
- Mean min temp: 19.0 °C (66.2 °F)
- Annual rainfall: 2,114.4 mm (83.24 in)
Localities around Cardwell
Ellerbeck	Ellerbeck	Coral Sea
Carruchan	Cardwell	Hinchinbrook Channel
Lumholtz	Lumholtz	Damper Creek

Cardwell is a coastal town and rural locality in the Cassowary Coast Region, Queensland, Australia. In the 2021 census, the locality of Cardwell had a population of 1,320 people.

== Geography ==
The Bruce Highway National Highway 1 and the North Coast railway line are the dominant transport routes; connecting with the Queensland provincial cities of Cairns and Townsville. Cardwell railway station in Bowen Street serves the town (18.2679°S 146.0282°E).

The town is a long narrow strip hugging the coast with Greenwood Hill immediately to the west of the town (18.2638°S 146.0153°E) rising to 64 metres (210 ft) above sea level.

West of Cardwell the rugged topography of the Cardwell Range intercepts the trade winds resulting in high rainfall. The coastal escarpment is covered in rainforest which transitions to the west to eucalypt woodland and tropical savanna. Cardwell Range biodiversity has been protected by the introduction of Forestry Reserves, National Parks and Queensland World Heritage Wet Tropics Areas.

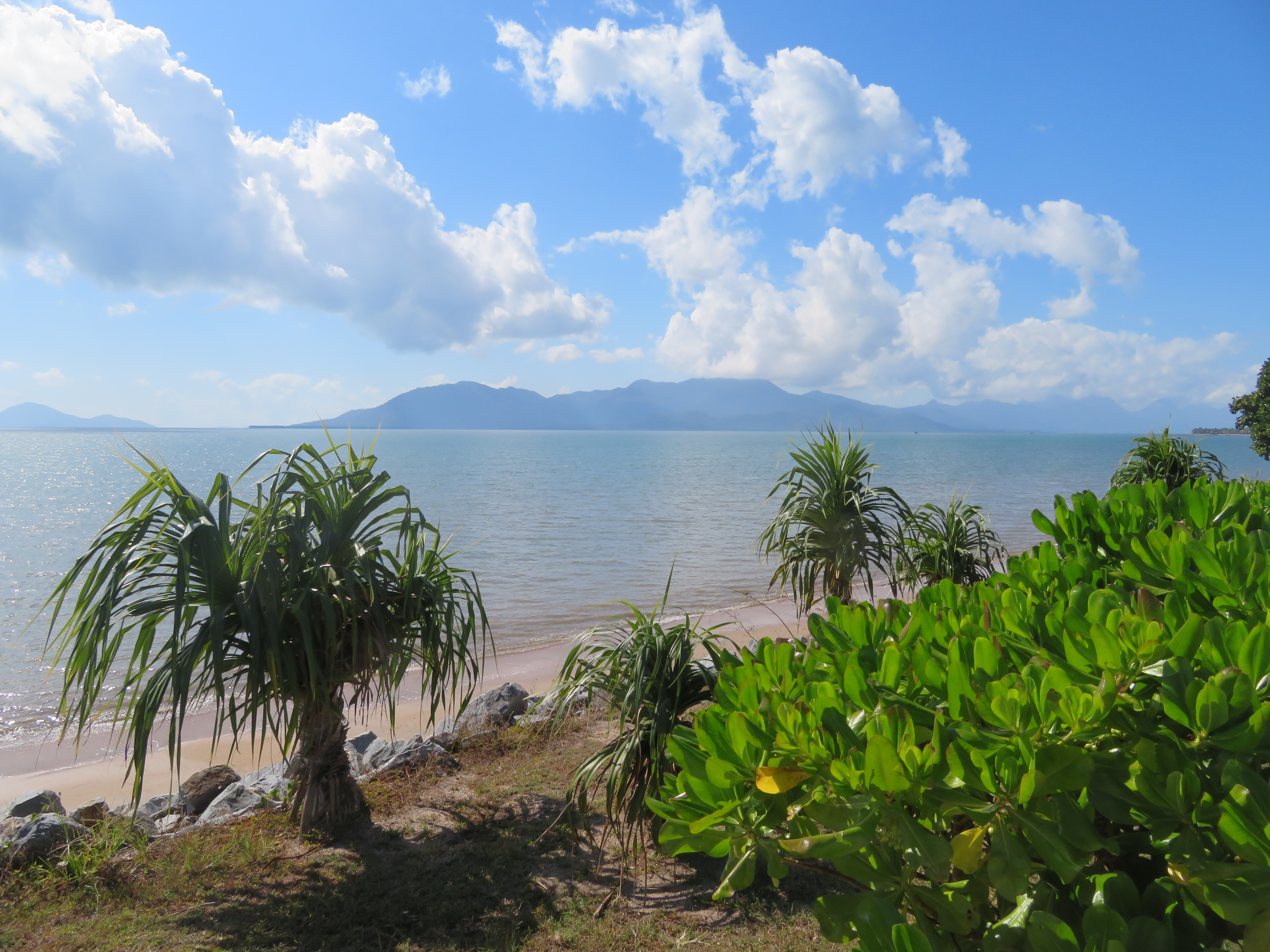
View from Cardwell Hinchinbrook Channel

Seaward lies the Hinchinbrook Channel (18.2738°S 146.0631°E) and Rockingham Bay (18.2384°S 146.0604°E) which are both are part of the Coral Sea. The Great Barrier Reef is further off-shore to the east.

Islands are visible from Cardwell including protected areas i.e. Hinchinbrook Island, Goold Island and the Brook Islands Group.

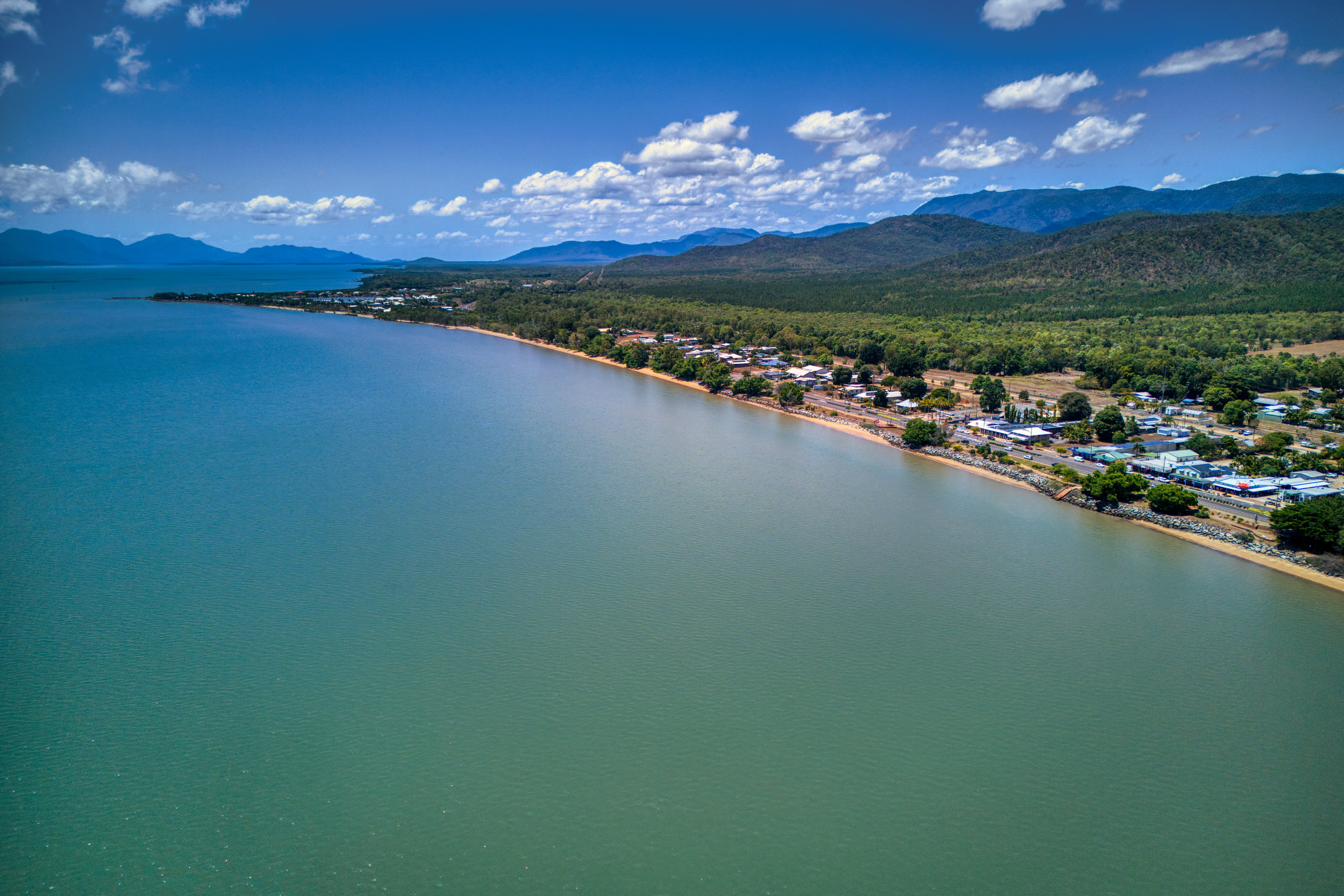
Oyster Point, view from Cardwell Jetty.

Oyster Point is one kilometre south of Cardwell (18.2773°S 146.0494°E). This location experienced one of Australia's important conservation battles.

=== Climate ===
Cardwell has a tropical climate. Under The Koppen Climate Classification, the climate is considered as ‘Am’ (Tropical Monsoon).

Climate data for Cardwell, Queensland (1991–2020 normals, extremes 1957–present)
Month	Jan	Feb	Mar	Apr	May	Jun	Jul	Aug	Sep	Oct	Nov	Dec	Year
Record high °C (°F)	41.7 (107.1)	41.8 (107.2)	38.7 (101.7)	34.7 (94.5)	31.7 (89.1)	31.1 (88.0)	30.2 (86.4)	32.5 (90.5)	36.0 (96.8)	36.6 (97.9)	40.0 (104.0)	42.6 (108.7)	42.6 (108.7)
Mean daily maximum °C (°F)	31.4 (88.5)	31.3 (88.3)	30.7 (87.3)	29.1 (84.4)	26.9 (80.4)	25.2 (77.4)	24.7 (76.5)	25.5 (77.9)	27.4 (81.3)	28.6 (83.5)	30.0 (86.0)	31.1 (88.0)	28.5 (83.3)
Daily mean °C (°F)	27.6 (81.7)	27.6 (81.7)	26.8 (80.2)	25.1 (77.2)	22.9 (73.2)	20.8 (69.4)	19.9 (67.8)	20.5 (68.9)	22.6 (72.7)	24.4 (75.9)	26.0 (78.8)	27.2 (81.0)	24.3 (75.7)
Mean daily minimum °C (°F)	23.7 (74.7)	23.8 (74.8)	22.9 (73.2)	21.1 (70.0)	18.8 (65.8)	16.4 (61.5)	15.1 (59.2)	15.6 (60.1)	17.8 (64.0)	20.1 (68.2)	22.0 (71.6)	23.3 (73.9)	20.1 (68.2)
Record low °C (°F)	17.2 (63.0)	16.8 (62.2)	14.4 (57.9)	11.0 (51.8)	6.1 (43.0)	3.3 (37.9)	2.8 (37.0)	4.2 (39.6)	6.5 (43.7)	9.2 (48.6)	14.4 (57.9)	15.1 (59.2)	2.8 (37.0)
Average precipitation mm (inches)	427.0 (16.81)	499.8 (19.68)	342.0 (13.46)	161.6 (6.36)	90.9 (3.58)	36.7 (1.44)	37.2 (1.46)	23.8 (0.94)	49.9 (1.96)	65.0 (2.56)	126.0 (4.96)	208.5 (8.21)	2,068.4 (81.43)
Average precipitation days (≥ 1.0 mm)	16.5	15.9	14.7	14.2	10.2	6.4	5.7	4.7	4.5	6.0	8.9	11.9	119.6
Average dew point °C (°F)	24.2 (75.6)	24.4 (75.9)	23.2 (73.8)	21.7 (71.1)	19.3 (66.7)	17.1 (62.8)	16.3 (61.3)	16.9 (62.4)	19.1 (66.4)	20.6 (69.1)	22.1 (71.8)	23.5 (74.3)	20.7 (69.3)
Source 1: National Oceanic and Atmospheric Administration
Source 2: Bureau of Meteorology

== History ==
The Aboriginal heritage is defined by Language Groups; the boundary of the Dyirbal and Warrgamay lies between Cardwell and Tully in the north.

Warrgamay (also known as Waragamai, Wargamay, Wargamaygan, Biyay, and Warakamai) is an Australian Aboriginal language in North Queensland. The language region includes the Herbert River area, Ingham, Hawkins Creek, Long Pocket, Herbert Vale, Niagara Vale, Yamanic Creek, Herbert Gorge, Cardwell, Hinchinbrook Island and the adjacent mainland.

Girramay (also known as Giramay, Garamay, Giramai, Keramai) is a language of Far North Queensland, particularly the area around Herbert River Catchment taking in the towns of Cardwell and Ingham. The Girramay language region includes the landscape within the local government boundaries of Cassowary Coast and Hinchinbrook Regional Councils.

The first Europeans settled in the area in January 1864 in order to create a port initially called "Port Hinchinbrook". Subsequently, the town was renamed Cardwell later in 1864 by explorer George Elphinstone Dalrymple after Edward Cardwell, 1st Viscount Cardwell, the Secretary of State for the Colonies at that time.

Cardwell was the first port settlement on the Queensland coast north of Port Denison (Bowen). The first party of non-indigenous people to settle at Rockingham Bay arrived in January 1864 and was led by George Elphinstone Dalrymple. They were 20 in number including James Morrill, William Alcock Tully, botanist John Dallachy, Arthur Jervoise Scott, Lieut. Marlow of the Native Police and his troopers Norman, Archy and Warbragen. Dalrymple also brought his "black boy" servant, an Aboriginal man from Stradbroke Island that he called "Cockey". They came from Bowen on the small schooner Policeman which was under the command of ex-Native Police officer Captain Walter Powell, with the 3 ton cutter Heather Bell in tow.

Dalrymple's main purpose in establishing a settlement in Rockingham Bay was to create a port as close as possible to the Valley of Lagoons Station of which he was part owner. Very soon after disembarking from the Policeman, he endeavoured to create a road from the coast to the Valley of Lagoons largely by expanding already existing native paths. A few miles inland from the landing site was an Aboriginal village and bora ground surrounded by native banana plantations that reminded Dalrymple of villages in Ceylon. The Warrgamay people in the area and on nearby Hinchinbrook Island were described as numerous and having some of the largest spears, shields and wooden swords ever recorded in Australia. Having told the local people through his interpreter that he had come to take possession of their lands, Dalrymple bizarrely expressed frustration at the supposed inability of the aboriginals to understand the concept of "Thou shalt not steal". James Morrill was more factual in his account of the founding of Cardwell writing that "I then said to [the natives] that they must clear out ... as we wished to occupy the land and would shoot any who approached, that we were strong and that another party would soon follow", and he also described how a group of Aboriginals "were set upon suddenly by Dalrymple's men and rather cut up."

Cardwell Post Office opened on 10 July 1864.

In March 1865, Lieutenant Blakeney and seven troopers of the Native Police spent two days clearing the area around Cardwell of Aboriginal presence by "burning camps and dispersing the natives."

In the late 1860s and early 1870s, Cardwell became a transport hub for prospectors heading to the Etheridge Shire goldfields 200 kilometres (120 mi) inland from the town. Captain John Moresby visited Cardwell in 1871 and wrote that "various tribes of aborigines roam about the vicinity, and not unnaturally regard the white men, who are rapidly dispossessing them of their homes, as mortal enemies. They ... suffer terrible retaliation at the hands of our countrymen, who employ native troopers, commanded by white men to hunt down and destroy the offenders when the opportunity offers".

In January 1872, two British dugong fishermen named Henry Smith and Charles Clements were killed at nearby Goold Island by resident Aboriginals. Wet weather prevented an immediate punitive expedition of four boats of armed local white men who were eager that "the blacks" be "taught that what they do is punishable by death". However, within the same month the Native Police forces of Sub-Inspectors Crompton and Johnstone completed a punitive mission and returned to Cardwell with three young Aboriginal children from the island. The eldest of the children was ten and "they were given away in Cardwell to domesticate them."

Cardwell Provisional School opened on 1 October 1870, becoming Cardwell State School on 22 August 1887.

Murray River Provisional School opened circa 1893 and closed in 1904. Its location was described as "via Cardwell".

In 1985, it was proposed to build an integrated marina and resort called Port Hinchinbrook at Oyster Point south of the town. The proposal encountered many environmental objections and financial collapse of one of the development companies, before construction commenced in 1999. The long-running controversy led to the Australian Senate establishing an inquiry in May 1998 to try to understand the roles of the regulatory processes of the three levels of government in the approval for the development and what might be learned from the experience and how processes might be improved.

The Cardwell Library opened in 2008.

Cardwell suffered significant damage from Cyclone Yasi, a category 5 cyclone, in February 2011. The marina and the boats within it were destroyed. As at 2019, ongoing legal disputes have prevented work on rebuilding the marina.

In 2013, the Cardwell community began being the target of an online hoax, which claimed the town's Christmas lights competition had been cancelled to appease the local Muslim community, forcing Cassowary Coast Regional Council to publicly debunk the rumours. Despite this, the hoax continues to circulate on social media. The hoax originated from an Islamophobic post on the "Meanwhile in Australia" Facebook page, which subsequently went viral. The post detailing the bogus information specifically named the Al Shalalah mosque as the source of the complaint, but such a mosque does not exist in Cardwell. The information contained within the post was also debunked by fact-checking websites such as snopes.com and Hoax Slayer. Although the original post was deleted, screenshots of the post continue to be shared on social media. Contrary to the sentiment shared in the fake post, the then Cassowary Coast mayor Bill Shannon said that he had received phone calls from Muslim leaders from as far away as Sydney encouraging Cardwell to continue with their Christmas light displays.

== Demographics ==
In the 2016 census, the locality of Cardwell had a population of 1,309 people. Aboriginal and Torres Strait Islander people made up 8.9% of the population. 72.5% of people were born in Australia and 83.0% of people spoke only English at home. The most common responses for religion were No Religion 25.6%, Catholic 22.6% and Anglican 20.6%.

In the 2021 census, the locality of Cardwell had a population of 1,320 people.

== Heritage listings ==
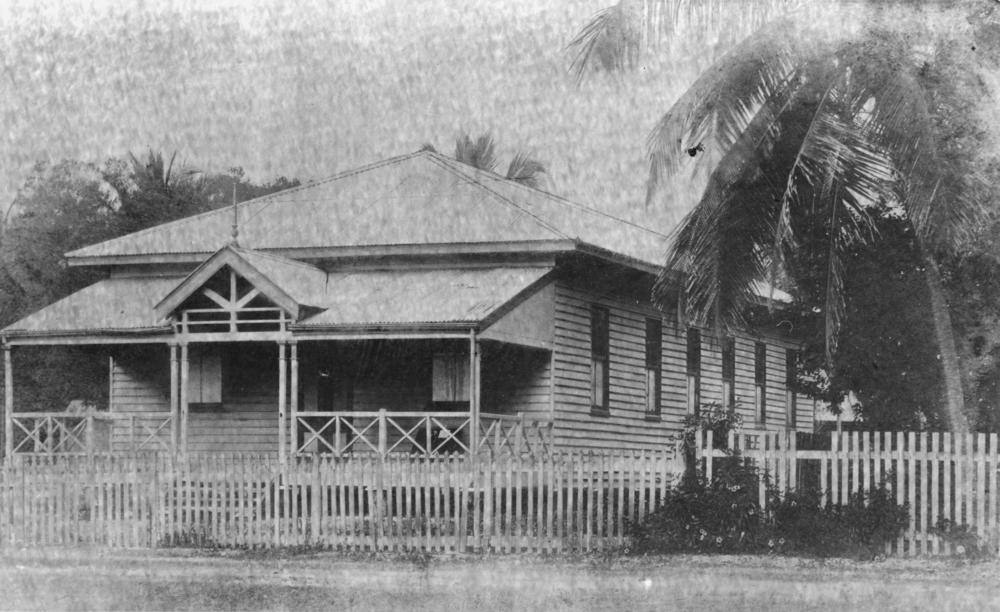
Cardwell Divisional Board Hall (later Cardwell Shire Chambers), 1911

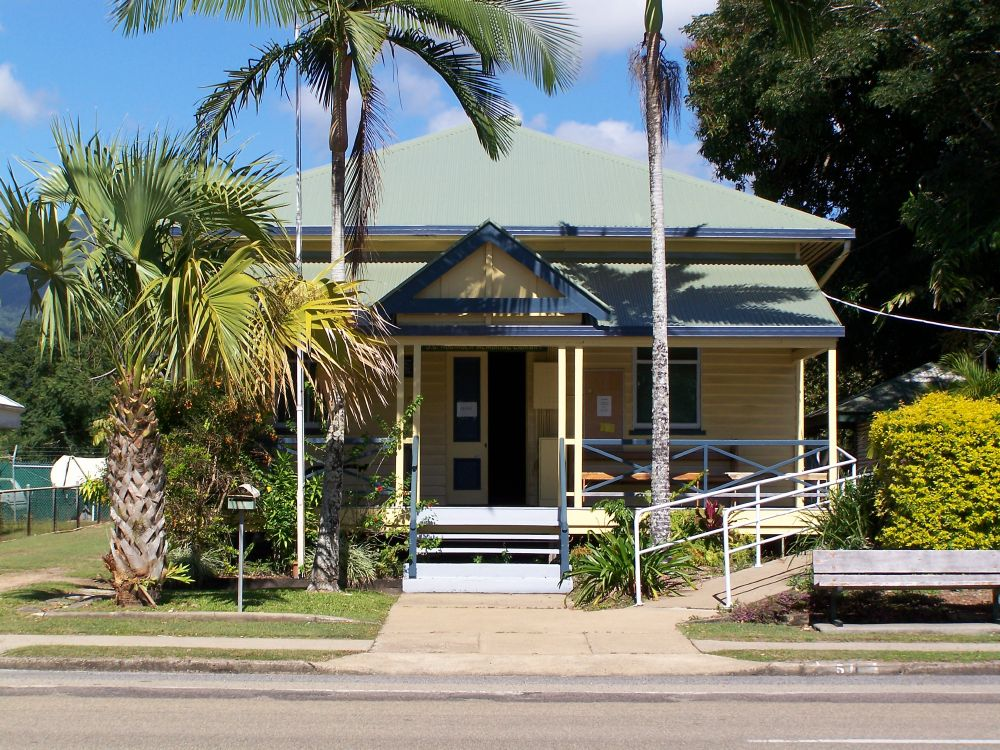
Divisional Board Hall, former Town Hall, 2008

Cardwell has a number of heritage-listed sites, including:

- Valley of Lagoons Road, Damper Creek: Stone Bridge, Dalrymple Gap Track
- 51 Victoria Street: Cardwell Divisional Board Hall (later Cardwell Shire Hall)
- 53 Victoria Street: Cardwell Post Office (now the Cardwell Bush Telegraph heritage centre)

Cardwell also has a granite monument erected in memory of Walter Jervoise Scott, a pioneer of the Valley of Lagoons. The monument was sent from Great Britain by his brothers intended for his grave at Valley of Lagoons. On arrival at Cardwell, it was found to be too large to transport up the rough track to Valley of Lagoons, so it was erected in Cardwell instead.

== Education ==
Cardwell State School is a government primary (Prep–6) school for boys and girls at 43 Victoria Street (18.2687°S 146.0308°E). In 2017, the school had an enrolment of 108 students with 6 teachers (5 full-time equivalent) and 6 non-teaching staff (5 full-time equivalent). In 2018, the school had an enrolment of 80 students with 5 teachers (4 full-time equivalent) and 6 non-teaching staff (5 full-time equivalent).

There is no secondary school in Cardwell. The nearest government secondary school is Tully State High School in Tully to the north.

== Facilities ==
Cardwell Police Station is at 49 Victoria Street (18.2679°S 146.0299°E).

Cardwell Fire Station is at 2 Panos Street (18.2667°S 146.0264°E).

Cardwell SES Facility is in Gregory Street (18.2576°S 146.0119°E).

Cardwell Community Health Centre is at 226 Victoria Street (18.2555°S 146.0168°E). Cardwell Ambulance Station is at 222–224 Victoria Street, adjacent to the health centre (18.2557°S 146.0169°E).

Cardwell Cemetery is in Gregory Street (18.2570°S 146.0107°E). It is managed by the Cassowary Coast Regional Council.

Cardwell Coast Guard is at 1 Victoria Street (18.2719°S 146.0342°E). It is a branch of the Australian Volunteer Coast Guard.

== Amenities ==
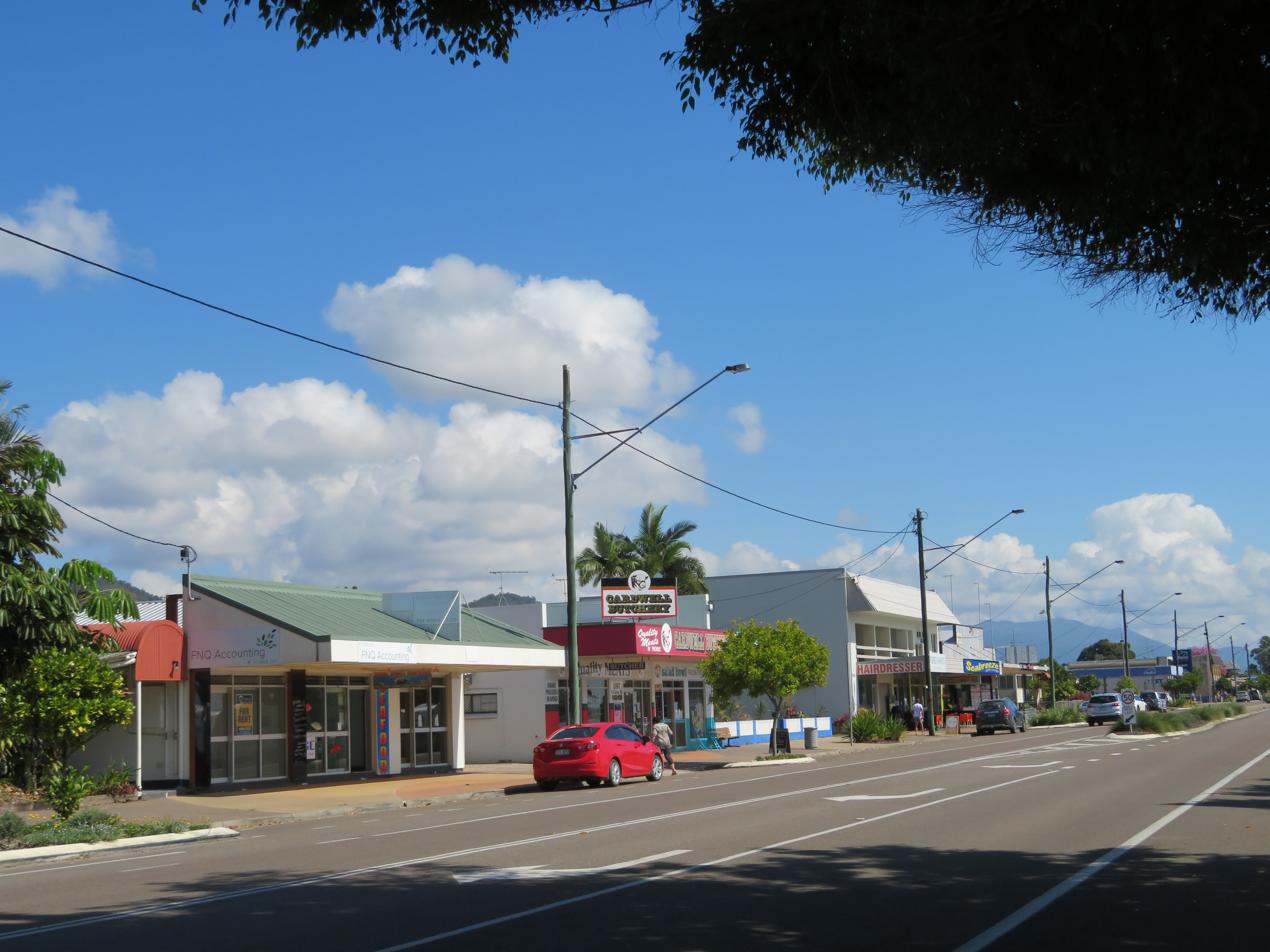
Victoria Street

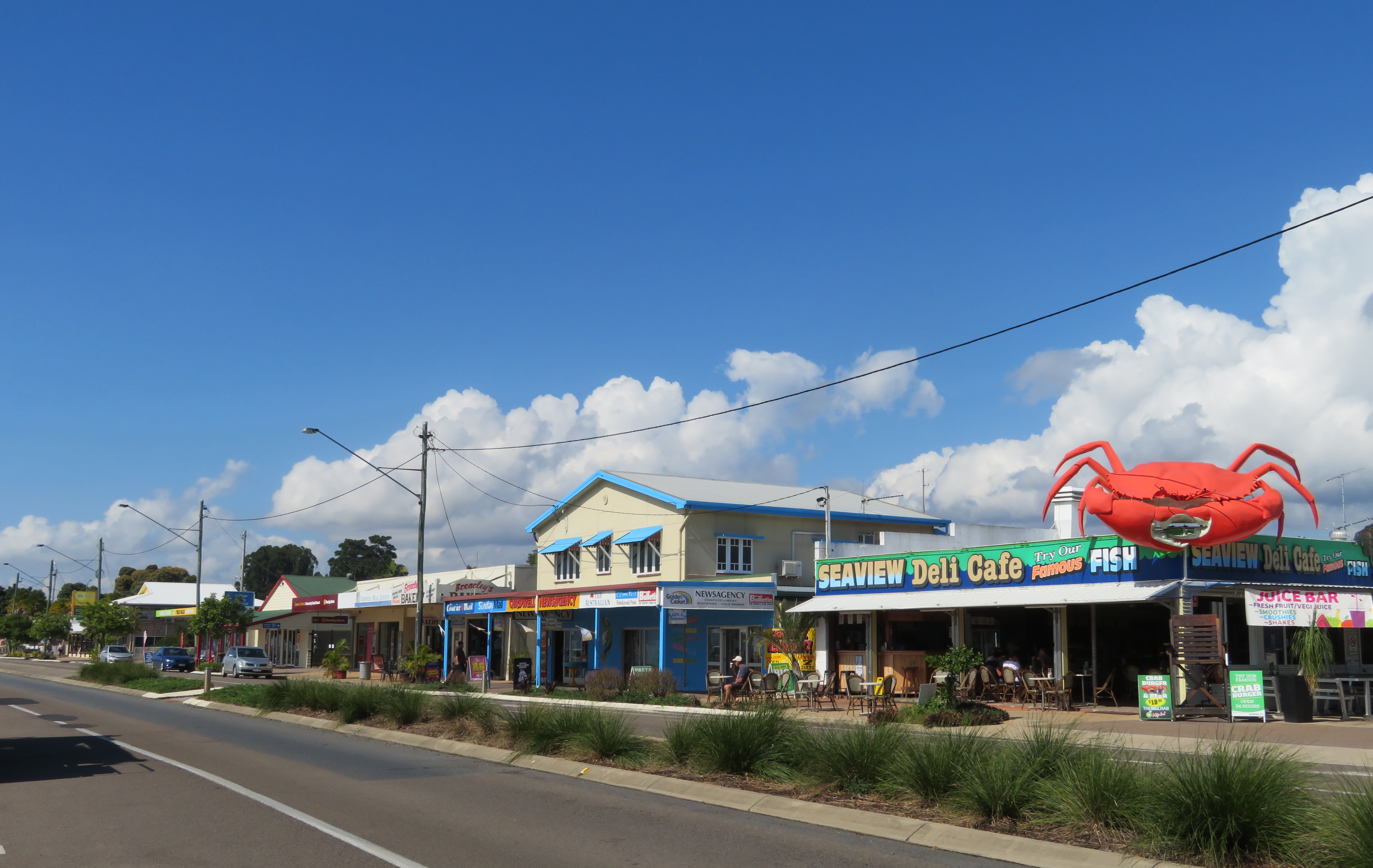
Victoria Street

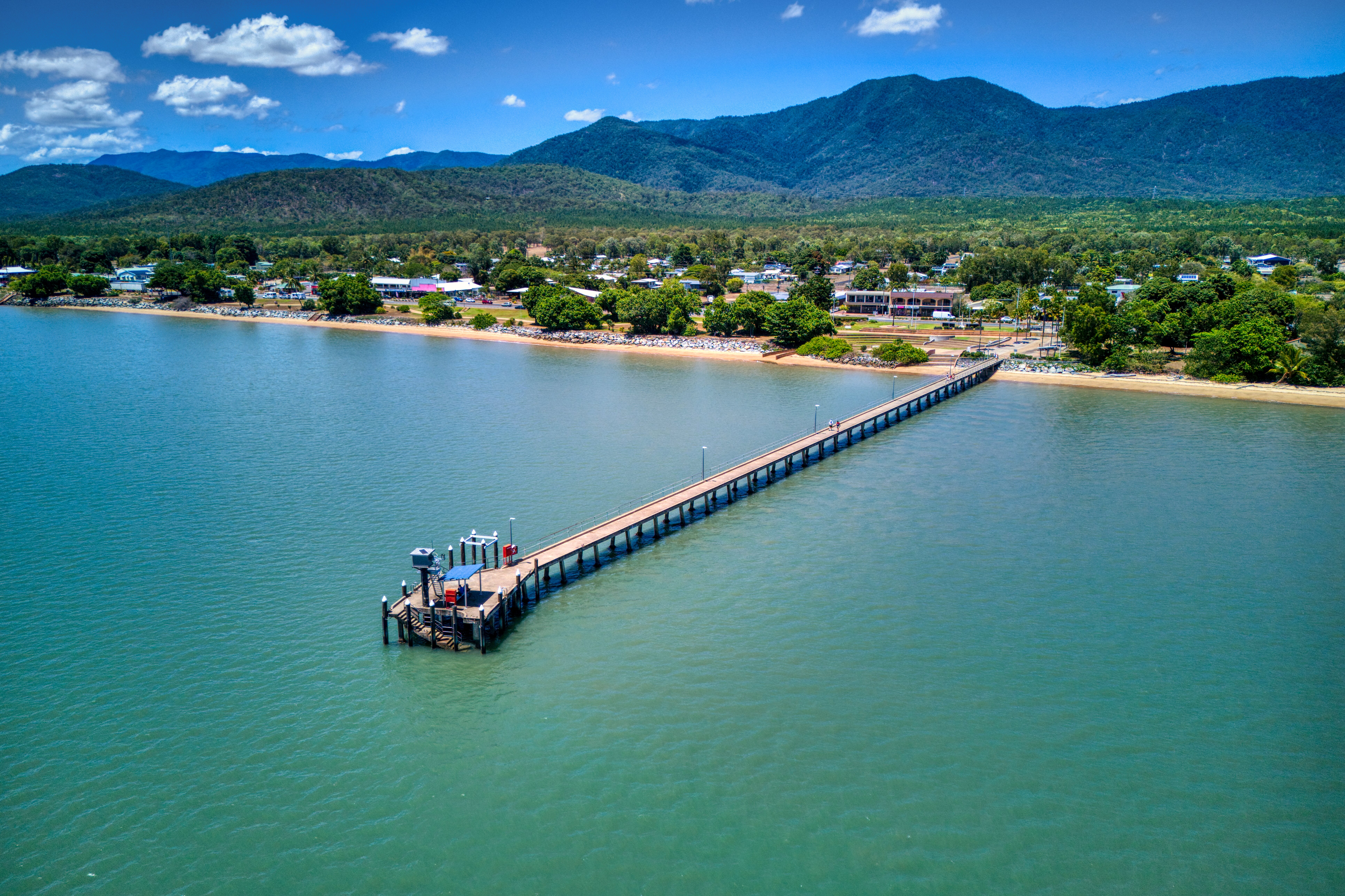
Jetty

The Cassowary Coast Regional Council operates a public library at 4 Balliol Street (18.2675°S 146.0287°E).

Cardwell Post Office is at 1 Brasenose Street (18.2662°S 146.0278°E).

Our Lady Star of the Sea Catholic Church is at 121 Victoria Street (18.2648°S 146.0263°E). It is within the Tully Parish of the Roman Catholic Diocese of Cairns.

Cardwell Country Club is at 23 Gregory Street (18.2693°S 146.0254°E). It has an 18-hole golf course and a lawn bowls green.

Port Hinchinbrook (also known as Cardwell Marina) is a 10.6-hectare (26-acre) marina in Front Street (18.2783°S 146.0449°E).

Port Hinchbrook boat ramp and floating walkway is in Foxtail Avenue (18.2830°S 146.0441°E). They are managed by the Cassowary Coast Regional Council.

There is a boat ramp in Sheridan Street (18.2567°S 146.0210°E). It is managed by the Cassowary Coast Regional Council.

With the establishment of Port Hinchinbrook, the Marina Public Boat Ramp provides year-round access to the protected marine environments of Hinchinbrook Channel, estuaries, islands and the Great Barrier Reef. The Cardwell Jetty is an important infrastructure asset, where visitors can socialise and view the coastal scenery; and anglers can enjoy both day and evening fishing activities.

Cardwell jetty is opposite 315A Victoria Street at the north end of Hinchinbrook Channel (18.2632°S 146.0257°E). It is managed by the Cassowary Coast Regional Council.

== Attractions ==
Cardwell Bush Telegraph Heritage Centre is one of the oldest buildings in North Queensland, and part of a precinct of heritage buildings operated as a museum at 53 Victoria Street (18.2676°S 146.0296°E).

Cardwell Lookout is at the end of Braenose Street (18.2831°S 146.0241°E). It provides panoramic views of the town and ocean beyond.

== Notable residents ==
- Isidor Lissner, politician
- John Murray, police inspector
- Ashleigh Southern, water polo player
- Margaret Thorsborne, naturalist, conservationist and environmental activist

== See also ==
- Cardwell railway station
