= Rockingham Bay =

- other
- Coordinates: 18.1451°S 146.0808°E
- Country: Australia
- State: Queensland
- Region: Far North Queensland
- Location: 150 km (93 mi) S of Cairns; 1,250 km (780 mi) NW of Brisbane

Rockingham Bay is a bay of the Coral Sea in the Cassowary Coast Region, Far North Queensland, Australia.

The bay opens onto the Coral Sea, part of the South Pacific Ocean. Adjacent to the bay is the Girramay National Park, south of which is the town of Cardwell. Goold Island is a small island in the bay, and south of this is Hinchinbrook Island, a larger island.

Rockingham Bay was one of the Australian places named by James Cook during his voyage in HMS Endeavour northwards along the east coast in 1770; he named it on Friday 8 June 1770. It was named after Charles Watson-Wentworth, 2nd Marquess of Rockingham.

The bay was significant in the exploration of the Cape York Peninsula by Edmund Kennedy in 1848. He was landed here with a group of twelve men, to begin the journey north. On the way, Kennedy left eight members of the expedition at Weymouth Bay, intending to pick them up later on the return by sea. However Kennedy and all but one member died later during the journey; all but two of the eight members left at Weymouth Bay died before they were relieved.

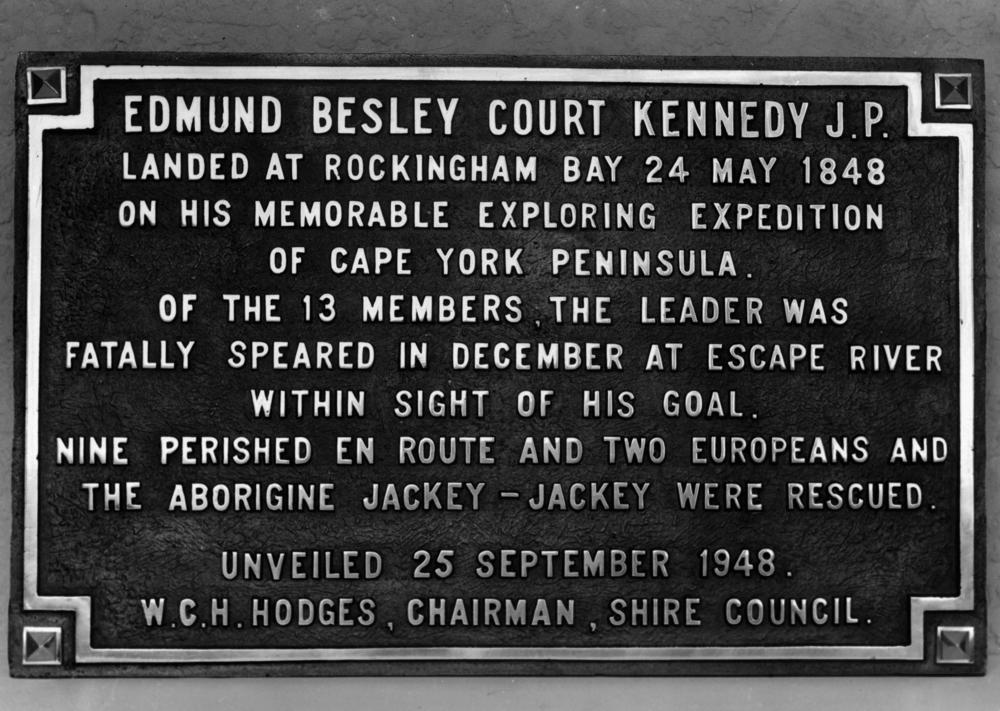
Memorial plaque for Edmund Kennedy at Rockingham Bay, unveiled in 1948
