= Oyster Point (Australia) =

Headland in Australia

Coordinates: 18°16′39″S 146°2′53″E

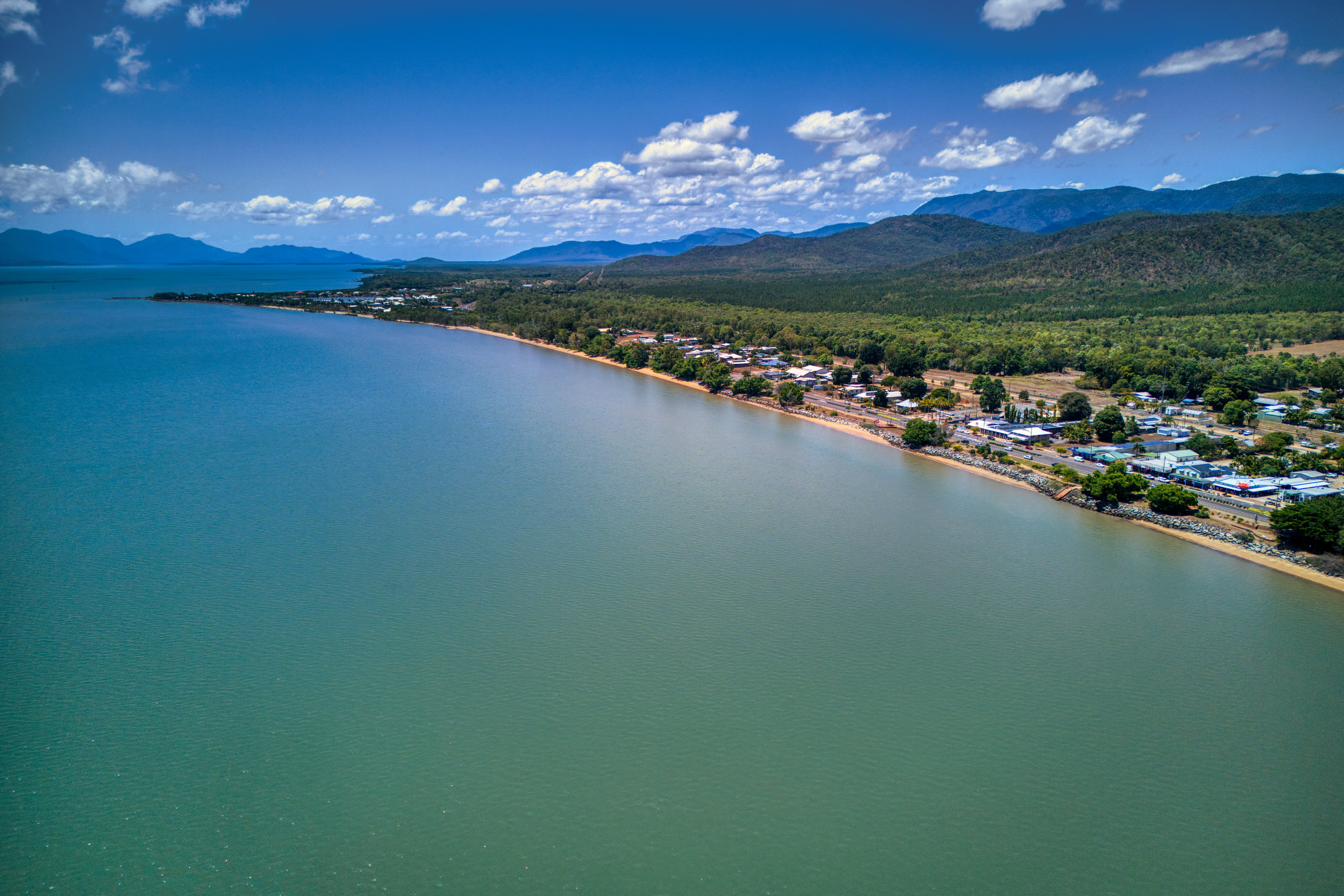
Oyster Point, view from Cardwell Jetty.

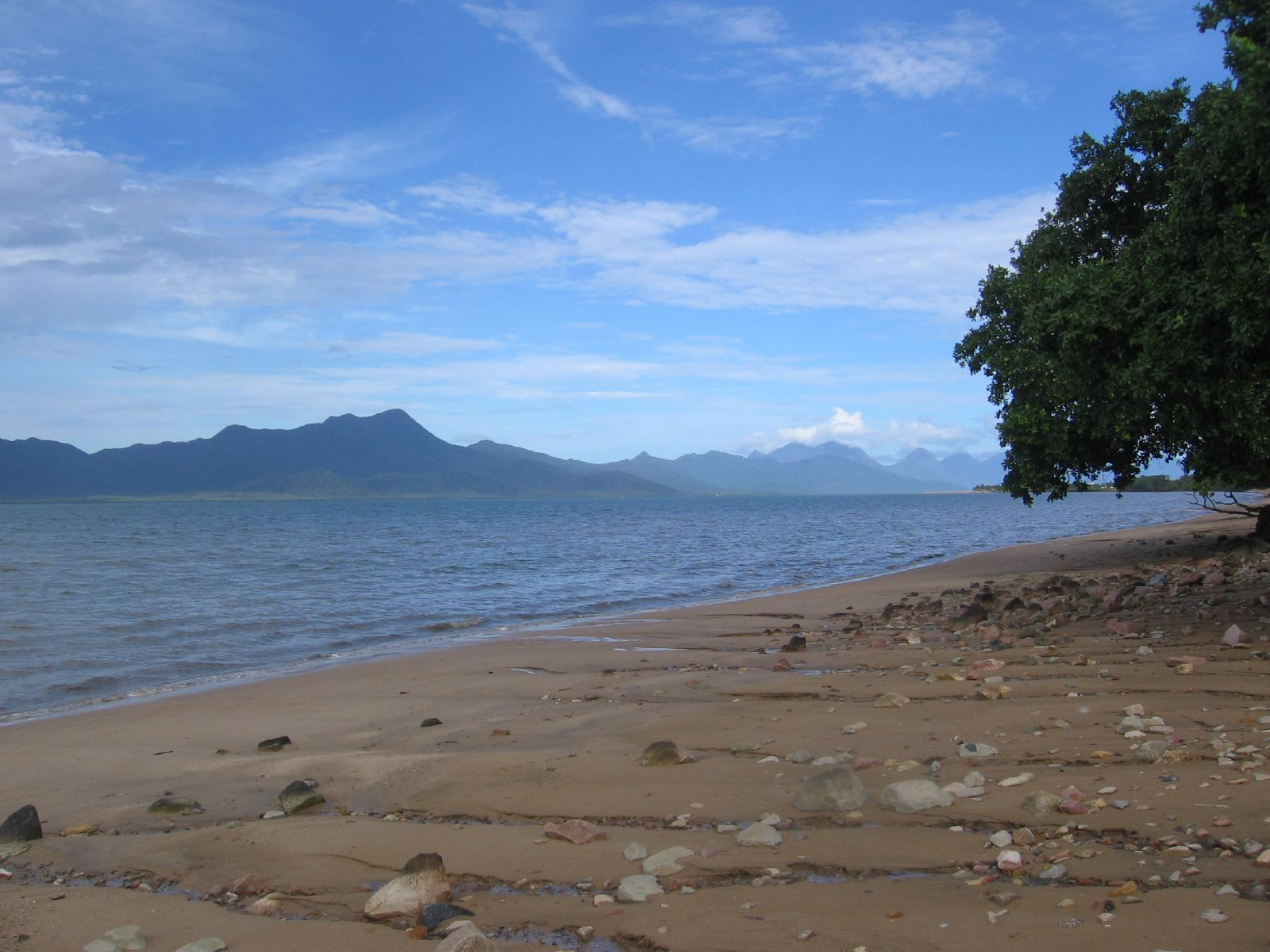
Oyster Point, protruding into the Hinchinbrook channel (right), viewed from Cardwell. The mountains on the left are Hinchinbrook Island.

Location in Queensland

Oyster Point lies at the mouth of Stoney Creek, about one kilometre south of Cardwell in northern Australia.

== History ==
=== 1970s ===
Oyster Point was the location for one of the country's most important conservation battles. The developer Keith Williams wanted to build a 1500-dwelling canal estate, resort and 250-berth marina called Port Hinchinbrook.

In 1977 the Queensland Harbours and Marine Department had published a report (Boat Harbour Feasibility Study) describing the site as unsuitable for a "boat harbour" (an older concept than "marina", in the days of small sailing craft) because it had "no naturally deep water", was "in a catchment", was subject to (cyclonic) "storm surge" and was subject to "severe siltation". Severe siltation means that the seabottom sediments (in this case having a high acid marine mud component) are always on the move. Any area dredged quickly fills in.

=== 1990s ===
The first companies which held the site at Oyster Point (a 26 ha special lease on an old mangrove island and 40 ha of freehold) were Tekin Australia and Resort Village Cardwell, the two companies sharing the same directors. In 1993, after liquidating RVC, some of these directors started a new shelf company Cardwell Properties and obtained the real estate. Within months Keith Williams had joined as a director, and then emerged as Sole Director (late 1993).

In 1994 the project was approved by the local Shire of Cardwell and the Queensland Government, led by Wayne Goss. The local community was split. Supporters of the project expected high economic benefits to follow. Under a four-way Deed of Agreement (the Conformed Deed) between the Cardwell Shire Council, Queensland Government, Commonwealth government and the Developer Cardwell Properties (sole director Keith Williams), the developer alone (and block buyers) would be responsible for the maintenance of roads, canals and sewerage on this private canal estate, including all maintenance dredging; this burden could never legally fall on state or local government

Stoney Creek was turned into "Grande Canal" by being bunded and dry-excavated to a depth of 6 metres and a width of 100 metres. The acid sulfate soils thus removed were mostly tipped into the Hinchinbrook Channel. The unusual depth excavated was to delay the necessity for dredging, given the poor success predicted by the Queensland Government Harbours and Marine Department Boat Harbour Feasibility Study 1977. It was not until 2004-2006 that buyers began to ask why there was "so much silt".

The developers promoted the site for its supposed easy access to the islands and outer reefs of the GBRWHA. Local marine wildlife includes crocodiles and dugongs.

The "Port Hinchinbrook" housing development sold poorly. From the outset developer Keith Williams (Cardwell Properties) wanted to sell out, first asking the Queensland Government (1993) and then both Federal and Queensland governments (1994).

Environmental groups were concerned the development was a threat to the Great Barrier Reef World Heritage Area and Wet Tropics of Queensland and that the local dugong population, already diminished, and local seagrass meadows, would be threatened by the proposed high boating levels.

In November 1994, after representations to the Commonwealth Government by North Queensland Conservation Council Inc. and Friends of Hinchinbrook Inc., the Governor-General of Australia gazetted a proclamation to stop the 13-metre-tall (43 ft) fringing mangrove forests from being cleared. Until then, these mangrove trees had been protected by small groups of activists on 24 hour rosters. Work stopped that afternoon and the activists came down from the trees. That night the developer defied the Proclamation and cleared the forests with swamp dozers under powerful lights.

In 1996 Friends of Hinchinbrook Inc. (FOH) challenged the Commonwealth Consent granted by environment minister Senator Robert Hill High Court under the Administrative Decisions (Judicial Review) Act 1977 . On appeal, the Court upheld the Consent, resting on specific Conditions in the Consent; one condition being that the Queensland Government write a statutory Queensland Coastal Plan that would protect the GBRWHA from the impacts of the proposed canal estate/"resort"/marina. Interim arrangements prevailed until that statutory Plan was enacted in 2003. This Plan was catchment-based and relied on statutory mapping (similar to the current GBRMPA zoning) preventing "adverse impact" along most of the GBRWHA coast.

On 14 September 1997 a walking party of 70 people, including children and a priest, singing "world heritage is forever", walked southwards (towards the mouth of Stoney Creek) along the state marine park (public land) outside the development property, at low tide, in the mud. The boundary of the development site there being a "right line" boundary which extends the private land into the sea, below the high water mark. Other small groups carried out minor actions involving crossing the cleared development site to get to Stoney Creek. At the mouth of Stoney Creek (Oyster Point itself) the walking party was trapped and assaulted by a group of men, while Queensland police watched. The Alliance to Save Hinchinbrook Inc. holds many photos and videos of the assaults, and 70 of the written statements made by the walkers for the Criminal Justice Commission. Some of the assaults on the small-group activists were shown on TV that night.

=== 21st century ===
In 2006, after another court case (Supreme Court Queensland), two short rock breakwaters were built, extending 100 m into the Hinchinbrook Channel to the boundary of the Great Barrier Reef World Heritage Area.

In 2009 "Port Hinchinbrook Services" was refused a sea dumping permit to dump in the Hinchinbrook Channel and their referral to the Commonwealth under the EPBC Act lapsed.

In 2011 Ben Williams took over after Keith Williams' death. After various attempts at further development proposals, the development site continued to deteriorate, according to the 200-300 people who lived there or owned blocks, eventually leading to liquidation of the development company and associated Port Hinchinbrook Services. Another development company entered the story as "Hinchinbrook Harbour" but only led to continuing liquidation.

In 2012 the entire Coastal Plan and the all-important statutory Regional Coastal Management Plans were abolished, and the Queensland Coastal Act amended to remove its catchment basis, by the outgoing Queensland Bligh government. Activists continued to protest near the site; mainly in groups up to 300 (on one occasion 1000).

In 2019 people associated with the development continue to pressure the state and local government (now post-amalgamation as the Cassowary Coast Regional Council) to take over the site's road and canal maintenance and dredging, contrary to the conditions of the Conformed Deed by which the development had been approved.

== See also ==
- Lucinda Point
