= Jackey Jackey =

Aboriginal Australian guide and surveyor companion

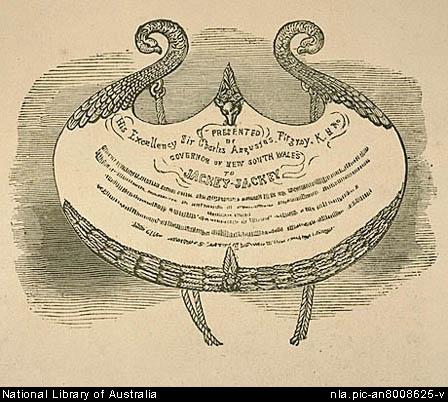
- Wood engraving (Walter G. Mason, 1857) of the solid silver breastplate made for Jackey Jackey in recognition of his heroic deeds (shaped to include swans and a fox)
- Born: c. 1833; Muswellbrook, New South Wales
- Died: 1854 (aged 20–21)
- Other name: Galmahra
- Occupation: Guide
- Employer: NSW Surveyor-General's Department
- Known for: Heroic deeds as guide and companion for surveyor Edmund Kennedy

Jackey Jackey (also spelt Jacky Jacky) (c. 1833–1854), Aboriginal name Galmahra (or Galmarra), was the Aboriginal Australian guide and companion to surveyor Edmund Kennedy. He survived Kennedy's fatal 1848 expedition into Cape York Peninsula (in present-day Queensland) and was subsequently formally recognised for heroic deeds by the Colony of New South Wales in words engraved on a solid silver breastplate or gorget, which read as follows:

Presented by His Excellency Sir Charles Augustus FitzRoy K.D. Governor of New South Wales, to Jackey Jackey, an Aboriginal native of that colony. In testimony of the fidelity with which he followed the late Assistant Surveyor E.B.C. Kennedy, throughout the exploration of York Peninsula in the year 1848; the noble daring with which he supported that lamented gentleman, when mortally wounded by the Natives of Escape River, the courage with which after having affectionately tended the last moments of his Master, he made his way through hostile Tribes and an unknown Country, to Cape York; and finally the unexampled sagacity with which he conducted the succour that there awaited the Expedition to the rescue of the other survivors of it, who had been left at Shelbourne Bay.

In the 1970s Australian school textbooks, such as Margaret Paice's Jackey Jackey, were published recording Jackey Jackey's life and achievements:

To the people of his tribe he was Galmarra, the Songman; to the men of the ill-fated Kennedy expedition he was Jackey Jackey, the young Aborigine. This slightly built teenager was to be their strength as they faced the mangrove swamps and tropical jungles.

The name "Jackey Jackey" since entered general Australian and Aboriginal Australian slang:

For whites it was a generic dismissive, denying blacks their individuality and hence their dignity. To blacks it meant a collaborator, the subservient native complicit in his own people's dispossession.

== Biographical details ==
As a young man, Galmahra seems to have grown up and lived at Jerrys Plains near Muswellbrook, New South Wales, most likely as a member of the local Australian Aboriginal nation: the Wonnarua.

In April 1848, still a young man, Galmahra was asked to accompany and help guide Assistant Surveyor Edmund Kennedy and team (including botanist William Carron) on an expedition through unknown country heading up into Cape York Peninsula. On that expedition Galmahra proved his value (including bush skills) and turned out to be a loyal and resilient member of the expedition upon whom Edmund Kennedy increasingly relied until he died, speared by Yadhaykenu (a.k.a. Jathaikana) people in the northern Peninsula area (December 1848), somewhere near the Escape River.

Following an inquiry into Edmund Kennedy and other expedition members deaths, Galmahra became more generally known to the colony of New South Wales as Jackey Jackey: an Aboriginal Australian to be honoured for his loyalty, heroic deeds, and general assistance to the expedition. By March 1849 a lithographic portrait of 'Jackey Jackey' had been produced for sale, and by the beginning of 1851 the Governor of New South Wales had presented him with a specially made, pure silver breastplate (see above) plus a £50 bank account gratuity.

Galmahra never wore the breastplate, never accessed the £50 bank account, and did not seem to have otherwise been fully engaged or employed by the colony. Instead he gained a reputation for enjoying his alcohol and, in 1854, after drinking too much during an overland journey to Albury, New South Wales, fell into a campfire and died.

== Legacy ==
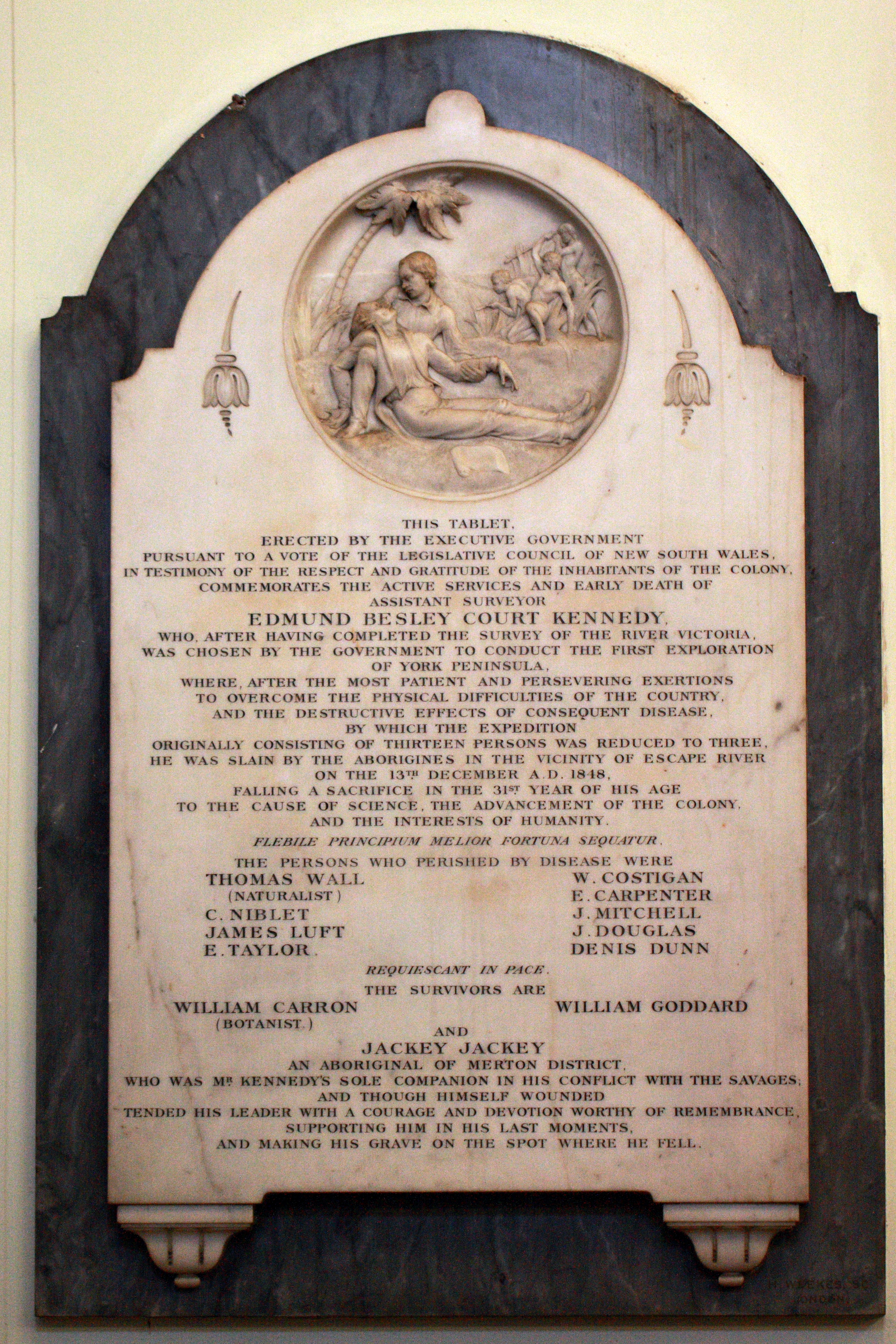
A memorial to Kennedy and Jackey Jackey on the wall of St James' Church, Sydney

Several places in Australia have been named in honour of Jackey Jackey, including:

- Jackey Jackey Creek (also known as Jacky Jacky Creek), near Bamaga, Cape York Peninsula, Queensland
- Jacky Jacky Range, Shire of Cook, Queensland
- Jackey Jackey Airfield, near Bamaga, Cape York Peninsula, Queensland, where there is a monument commemorating him
- Galmarra Street, Ngunnawal, Australian Capital Territory

== See also ==
- Edmund Kennedy
- List of Indigenous Australian historical figures
