= Clearwater Marine Aquarium =

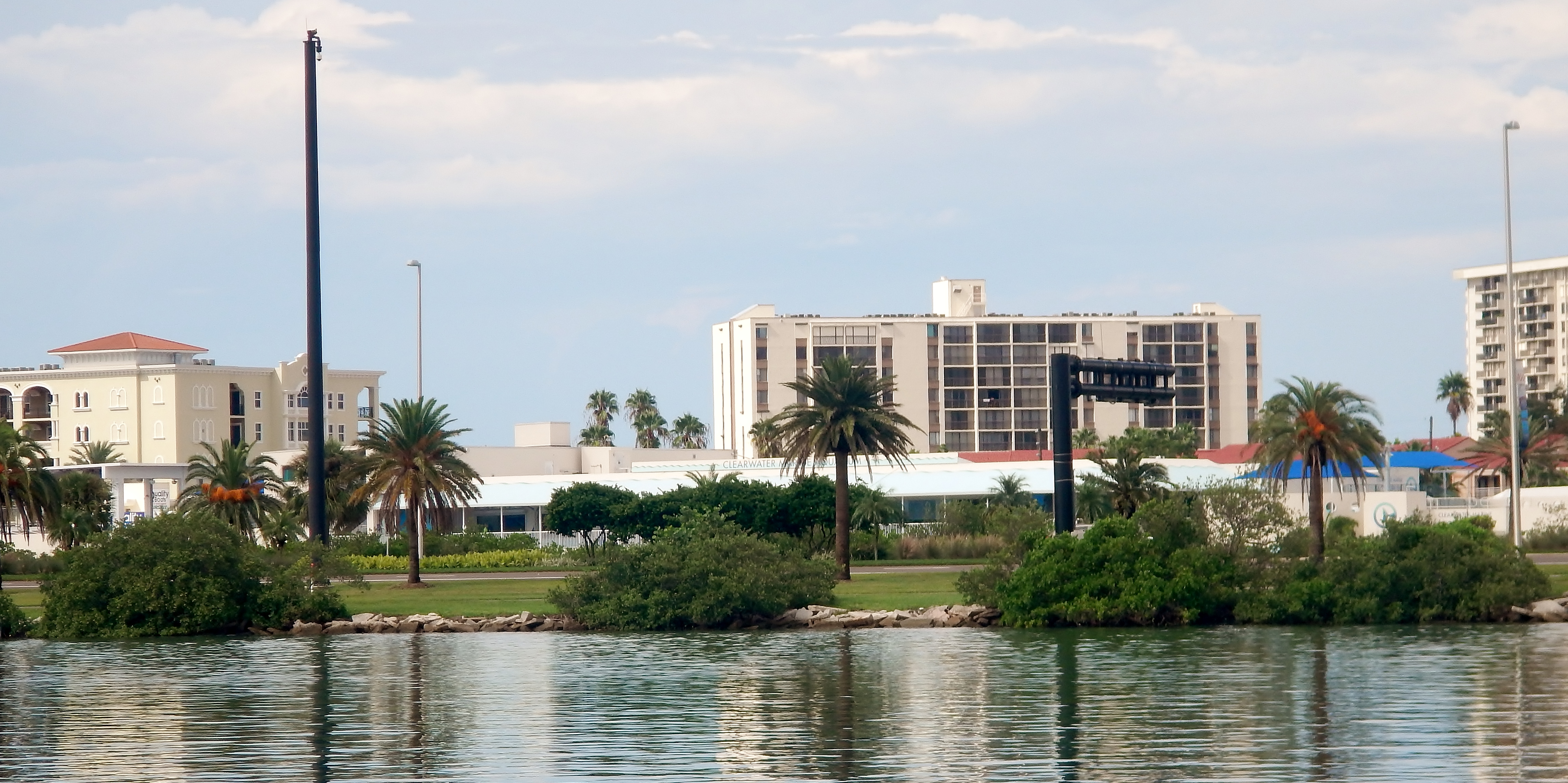
- Interactive map of Clearwater Marine Aquarium
- 27.97686°N 82.81907°W
- Date opened: 1972 (As Clearwater Marine Science Center)
- Location: Clearwater, Florida, United States
- No. of species: 59
- Volume of largest tank: 1.5 million gallons
- Annual visitors: 750,000
- Major exhibits: 17
- Website: www.cmaquarium.org

Clearwater Marine Aquarium is a 501(c)(3) non-profit organization, and aquarium in Clearwater, Florida. It is dedicated to the rescue, rehabilitation and release of sick and injured marine animals, public education, conservation, and research.

Clearwater Marine Aquarium opened in 1972 at its current location on Clearwater Beach, in a former water treatment plant (the large pools being well-suited for rehabilitation operations).

Numerous forms of marine life are permanent residents at the aquarium, all of which have serious injuries that prevent their return to the wild.

The aquarium's best-known permanent resident was Winter, a bottlenose dolphin who was rescued in December 2005 after having her tail caught in a crab trap. Her injuries caused the loss of her tail, and the aquarium fitted her with a prosthetic tail which brought worldwide attention to the facility. Winter later starred in the 2011 film, Dolphin Tale, and the sequel, Dolphin Tale 2, shot partially on location at the aquarium.

== History ==
In 1972, a group of private volunteers decided it was time to establish a permanent marine biology learning center in the Clearwater area. They were incorporated as a 501(c)(3) nonprofit organization under the name Clearwater Marine Science Center (CMSC). In 1978, the city of Clearwater agreed to donate the aquarium's current facility, an abandoned water treatment plant, to CMSC. With its huge holding pools and bayside location, the building was a perfect fit for a marine facility's needs. In 1979, marine biologist Dennis Kellenberger was hired as CMSC's Executive Director. Kellenberger's main duties were teaching summer camp classes for children and spearheading a massive remodeling effort of the facility.

Gradually, the cement and steel building was modified for aquarium purposes and in 1980 was granted a USDA Research Facility permit, allowing it to prepare two 65,000 gallon pools for the rehabilitation of dolphins and sea turtles. In 1981, the first exhibit room was opened to the public. The room featured old exhibits from the Sea-Orama, a mounted fish exhibit which was formerly on display at the Clearwater Marina. Over the next few years, thanks to individual and corporate donations and immense volunteer efforts, CMSC continued to grow. In 1984, CMSC rescued a stranded Atlantic bottlenose dolphin named "Sunset Sam." This was the first dolphin in Florida to survive a beaching. However, due to chronic liver problems, Sunset could not be released into the wild and became CMSC's first resident dolphin. Sunset Sam was taught how to paint as a form of animal enrichment, and the sales of his paintings were used to fund the CMSC's operations and stranding program.

In the 1990s, as renovations continued to provide more public area and education programs, the facility's name was changed to Clearwater Marine Aquarium (CMA) to reflect the increasing level of community interaction. In 2005, CMA's most famous permanent resident, a bottlenose dolphin named Winter, was rescued by CMA after being discovered entangled in the ropes of a crab trap. The ropes cut off the blood supply to the dolphin's tail, and resulted in its loss. To give Winter the ability to swim normally, CMA worked with a team of experts to create a prosthetic silicone and plastic tail for her. Winter's story brought international recognition to CMA and inspired two major films, Dolphin Tale and Dolphin Tale 2, each of which was partially filmed at the aquarium.

== Animals ==
Clearwater Marine Aquarium currently is home to manatees, North American river otters, Atlantic bottlenose dolphins, Rough-toothed dolphins, green sea turtles, Kemp's ridley sea turtles, cownose rays, southern stingrays, nurse sharks, great white pelicans, and other fish, including gag, hogfish, and red drum. Each permanent resident was deemed non-releasable by National Marine Fisheries and unable to return to the wild due to injuries or other impairments. Once deemed non-releasable, National Marine Fisheries then selected CMA as the best location for their permanent home due to the staff and facilities CMA is able to provide.

=== Dolphins (Current) ===
==== Hope ====
Hope is a resident dolphin at CMA. In December 2010, she was discovered in the shallows of Indian River Lagoon as an orphaned 2-month-old calf, still attempting to nurse from her mother, who had died after becoming beached. It was ultimately determined that Hope did not make a good candidate for release because she was very young and had not learned the necessary survival skills to be out in the wild. Hope co-starred in Dolphin Tale 2, a sequel to the original movie which dramatized her rescue. Today, Hope lives at the aquarium with Nicholas, Izzy, and six rough-toothed dolphins, and she enjoys enrichment items such as squirt guns and bubbles.

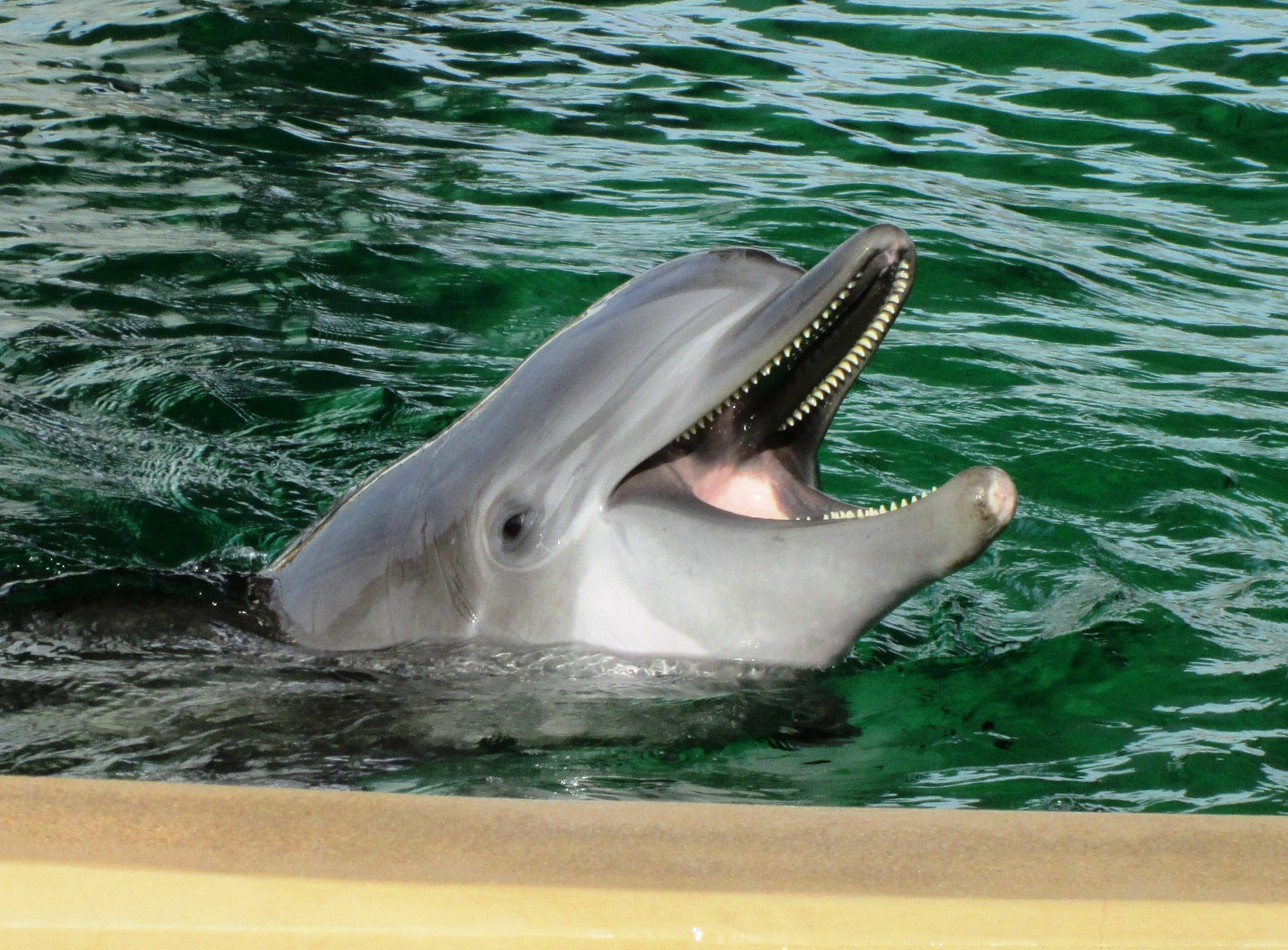
Nicholas

==== Nicholas ====
Nicholas is an Atlantic bottlenose dolphin. For many years, he was the only male dolphin currently residing at CMA. On December 24, 2002, he was rescued with his mother as a 6-month-old calf after both became stranded near Gibsonton, Florida. The mother dolphin died three days later due to respiratory illness. Nicholas remained in critical condition, suffering both from malnourishment and severe sunburns which covered over thirty percent of his body. CMA provided 24-hour care for Nicholas for several months, bottlefeeding him and providing wound care. Nicholas was eventually weaned by the animal care staff at CMA, and his wounds completely healed.

Like Hope, it was determined that Nicholas did not make a suitable candidate for release because of his dependent status at the time of his stranding and rehabilitation. He lacks the necessary survival skills, which he could only learn from his mother, to survive in the wild. Nicholas lives in the Ruth & J.O. Stone Dolphin Complex with other bottlenose dolphins Hemingway, Winter (deceased), Hope, and PJ. Nicholas was featured briefly in the movie Dolphin Tale, playing a female dolphin alongside Panama named Christa. He appears in Dolphin Tale 2, portraying Mandy. He is known for his ability to select the winners of sports match-ups which is part of his enrichment.

==== Rudolph ====
Rudolph, nicknamed Rudy, is Clearwater Marine Aquarium's first rough-toothed dolphin resident. He stranded off Sanibel Island in December 2019 as a juvenile male. He became a permanent resident because he did not have the hearing range required for echolocation. Rudy lives with the aquarium's other rough-toothed dolphins.

==== Izzy ====
Izzy is a female Atlantic bottlenose dolphin and is estimated to be 8 years old. She was rescued in June 2022 in Texas after several years of illegal human interactions. These interactions caused her health to decline to the point that she needed to be rescued and taken out of the wild. She arrived at Clearwater Marine Aquarium on November 4, 2022. Today, she lives with Hope and Nicholas in the Ruth and J.O. Stone Dolphin Complex and can often be seen toting around her favorite disc toy.

==== Rosie ====
Rosie is a female rough-toothed dolphin. She stranded in February 2023 and, after her rescue, was deemed non-releasable because of her deafness and inability to echolocate.

==== Doris ====
Doris is a female rough-toothed dolphin who arrived at CMA on June 4, 2025 at the estimated age of 27. She was rescued September 27, 2004 in Cape San Blas, Florida. After being deemed non-releasable by NOAA, she lived at Gulf World until being transferred to CMA.

==== Kitana ====
Kitana is a female rough-toothed dolphin who arrived at CMA on June 4, 2025 at the estimated age of 19. She was rescued August 19, 2009 in Cape San Blas, Florida. She was deemed non-releasable due to hearing loss and lived at Gulf World before coming to CMA.

==== Dagny ====
Dagny is a female rough-toothed dolphin who arrived at CMA on June 4, 2025 at the estimated age of 9. She was rescued October 12, 2018 in Biloxi, Mississippi after the aftermath of Hurricane Michael. Deemed non-releasable due to her young age and hearing loss, she lived at Gulf World before arriving at CMA.

==== Wren ====
Wren is a female rough-toothed dolphin who arrived at CMA on June 4, 2025 at the estimated age of 3. She was rescued July 29, 2023 on St. Vincent Island, Florida. Due to her hearing loss, she was deemed non-releasable and lived at Gulf World before arriving at CMA.

Squirt

Squirt is a female Atlantic bottlenose dolphin who arrived at CMA on December 18, 2025, at the estimated age of 15. She was born in 2010 under human care at Miami Seaquarium in Miami, Florida. She was transferred to CMA due to the closure of Miami Seaquarium. Because she was born in human care, she lacks the necessary skills to survive in the wild. She was transferred to CMA with another dolphin, Star.

=== Dolphins (Past) ===
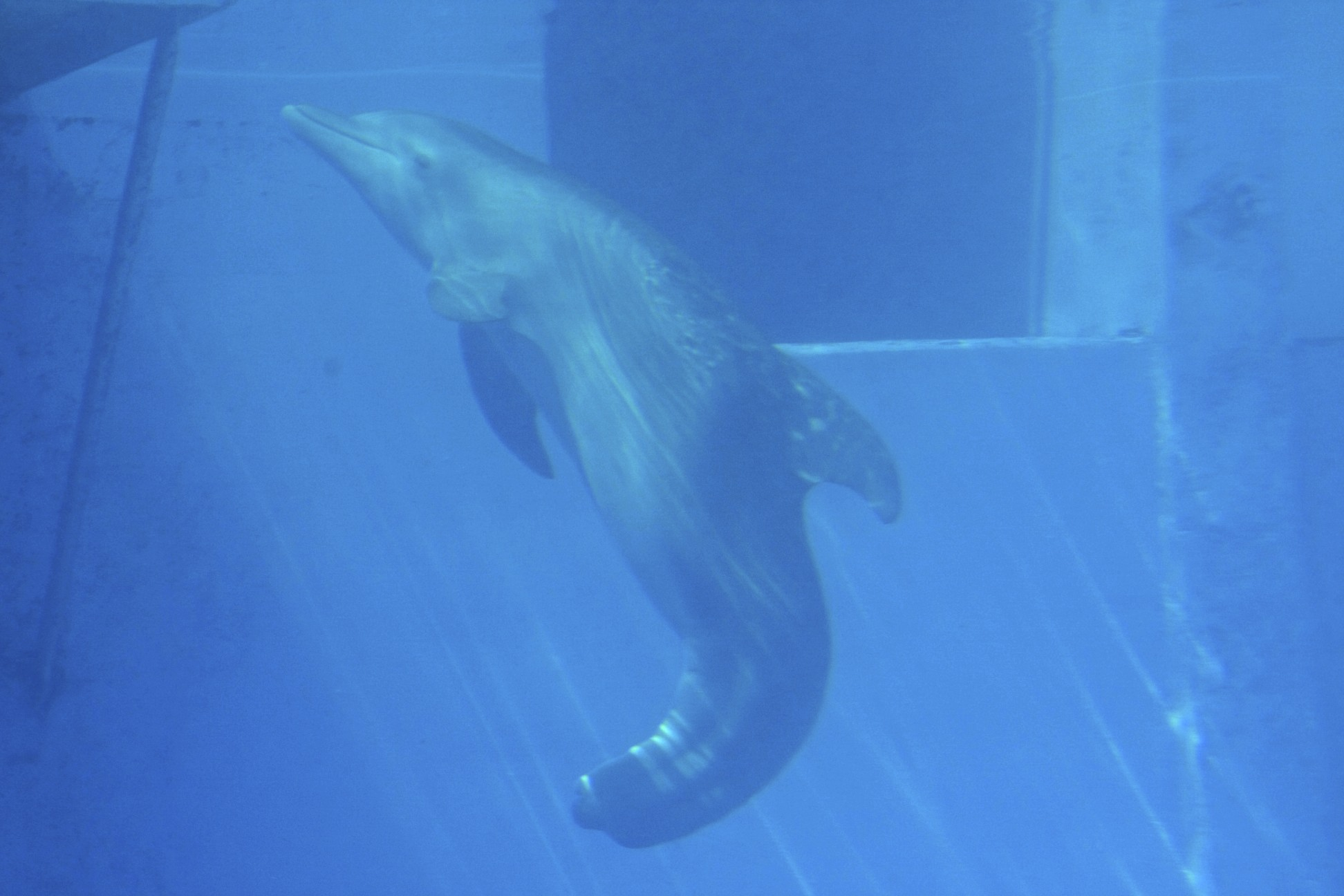
Winter, a dolphin at the aquarium

==== Winter ====
Winter, the most famous aquarium resident, was a female Atlantic bottlenose dolphin who was rescued December 10, 2005 by Clearwater Marine Aquarium team members and other partners from the Southeast Standing Network after being found caught in a crab trap. She lost her tail due to her injuries. Winter developed a way to swim without a tail in an unnatural side to side motion, but because this was damaging her spinal cord, a prosthetic tail was made especially for her by Kevin Carroll and a team of experts from Hanger, Inc. Winter starred in the 2011 movie Dolphin Tale and the 2014 sequel Dolphin Tale 2, which was inspired by her story and the sequel inspired on Hope's story. She resided in the Ruth & J.O Stone Dolphin Complex with other bottlenose dolphins Hope, PJ, Nicholas and Hemingway. On November 11, 2021, Winter died at the age of 16.

==== PJ ====
PJ (short for Panama Junior, because she has the same hearing problem as former resident Panama) was a female Atlantic bottlenose dolphin who was rescued in August 2018. At approximately 51 years old, she was the oldest of the rescued dolphins at CMA. PJ was found in shallow water in Old Tampa Bay. Although she recovered well, she was deemed unreleasable due to numerous medical issues, including hearing and vision loss, worn teeth, and arthritis. She first lived together with Hope and Winter and later with Hope and Apollo. In October 2022, PJ died of natural causes at the age of 51.

==== Hemingway ====
Hemingway was a male Atlantic bottlenose dolphin who was found stranded at Fiesta Key, Florida in 2019. After receiving treatment at SeaWorld, he was transferred to the Clearwater Marine Aquarium. Hemingway became a permanent resident at CMA due to health issues and hearing loss. He lived together with Nicholas and also met Apollo. He died in January 2023 at the estimated age of 37.

==== Apollo ====
Apollo was a male Atlantic bottlenose dolphin who was found stranded at Playalinda, Florida, in May 2021. He was transported to SeaWorld for rehabilitation because he was thin and had parasites on his dorsal fin, pectoral fins, and fluke at the time of his rescue. During a hearing test administered by the National Marine Mammal Foundation, it was discovered that Apollo suffered from hearing loss. In December 2021, he was transferred to the Clearwater Marine Aquarium and became a permanent resident there. At approximately 2 years old, he was the youngest of the resident dolphins at CMA. Apollo was first introduced to PJ and Hope and later met Hemingway and Nicholas, as well as Izzy. He died in June 2023 at the age of 4 due to hydrocephalus.

==== Rex ====
Rex was one of the aquarium's first rough-toothed dolphins. He was discovered on St. George Island in April 2019; he was about 5 to 7 years old. Because of significant hearing loss, Rex became a permanent resident at the aquarium and lived with Rudolph, the aquarium's other rough-toothed dolphin at the time. Rex died in March 2023.

==== Star ====
Star was a female Atlantic bottlenose dolphin who arrived at CMA on December 18, 2025, at the estimated age of 26. She was born in 1999 under human care at Miami Seaquarium in Miami, Florida. She was transferred to CMA due to the closure of Miami Seaquarium. Because she was born in human care, she lacked the necessary skills to survive in the wild. She was transferred to CMA with another dolphin, Squirt. On May 1, 2026, Star showed signs of discomfort. She died on May 8, 2026 due to gastrointestinal illness.

=== Manatees ===
CMA completed its Manatee Rehabilitation Center in the summer of 2024 and welcomed its first patients on July 30, 2024. These patients, Yeti and Zamboni, are juvenile male manatees that were rescued in early 2024 due to cold stress. However, Hurricane Helene damaged the Manatee Rehabilitation Center in late 2024, and the manatees were transferred to another facility until repairs to the Center can be made

On November 10, 2025, CMA welcomed three new manatee patients from Cincinnati Zoo & Botanical Garden and the Columbus Zoo. One manatee, Sabal, was transferred to ZooTampa at Lowry Park on December 26, 2025, as she was not adapting well. The other two manatees, Orchid and Vora, were both released on February 17, 2026. Vora was released at Blue Spring State Park and Orchid was released in Crystal River. Both manatees were tagged with satellite tracking devices by the Clearwater Marine Aquarium Research Institute.

=== North American river otters ===
The aquarium currently has two North American river otters. Boomer arrived at the aquarium in 2018 from another facility, and he had become Walle's close companion. The newest otter, Opie, is a young otter kit that was attacked by a dog which left an injury to his right eye. Due to his rehabilitation at another facility, Opie lost instincts necessary to survive in the wild. He was brought to CMA in March 2024 to receive additional veterinary care. Both otters currently reside in the "Otter Oasis" exhibit at Clearwater Marine Aquarium.

Walle was rescued from the wild as an orphaned pup by a private individual, and was transferred to CMA after becoming too dependent on humans. He arrived on November 19, 2012 and died on May 6, 2026 due to sudden illness.

=== Pelicans ===
Four great white pelicans, Ricky, Tyndall, Skylar, and Matthew, currently reside at the aquarium. They are the only aquarium residents that are not native to Florida. Ricky was trained by a film company to play the role of "Rufus" for the films Dolphin Tale and Dolphin Tale 2.

=== Sea turtles ===
Clearwater Marine Aquarium currently has one loggerhead, eight green sea turtles, and two Kemp's ridley sea turtles. Many of them were rescued by CMA after being hit by boats, entangled in fishing line, or sustaining other permanent injuries that prevent their return to the wild. They permanently reside in the "Turtle Cove", "Turtle Bayou", and "Mavis's Rescue Hideaway" exhibits.

=== Sharks ===
The aquarium is home to one fully-grown nurse shark, Thelma. A private collector illegally took the shark out of the wild as a young pup. When Thelma outgrew her tank, the collector could no longer care for her and donated Thelma to CMA. At the aquarium, she shares an exhibit with hogfish, red drum, gag grouper, mangrove snapper, black sea bass, common snook, pinfish, red grouper, lookdown, and white grunt.

=== Stingrays ===
Cownose rays currently reside in the "Stingray Beach" and "Mavis's Rescue Hideaway" exhibits, where they can be touched and fed by aquarium visitors.

== Expansion ==
=== 2020 ===
Clearwater Marine Aquarium's expansion allows for the rescue and rehabilitation of more marine life, creates an enhanced living habitat for the resident non-releasable animals, and provide more space for guests. The expansion triples rescued dolphin habitat space consisting of 5 connecting pools, with approximately 1,500,000 US gallons (5,700,000 L) of water, nearly triple the previous amount. This enhanced, more natural habitat is known as the Ruth and J.O. Stone Dolphin Complex, and it welcomed its first non-releasable inhabitants, Winter, Hope, PJ, Nicholas, and Hemingway in 2020. There are new expanded education areas and a total new guest space of 103,000 sq feet, including a new cafe and retail area. CMA is currently researching the ways in which it can utilize the adjacent waterway for rescue and rehabilitation work. There is a new parking garage consisting of 400 parking spots. These new expansions were opened in October 2020.

=== "Rising Tides" ===
In early 2024, CMA announced a multi-year expansion plan called "Rising Tides." The first phase of this plan is the Manatee Rehabilitation Center, which welcomed its first manatee patients, Yeti and Zamboni, on July 30, 2024.
