= Gulf World Marine Park =

Coordinates: 30°12′40″N 85°52′2″W

- Logo of Gulf World Marine Park
- Interactive map of Gulf World Marine Park
- Date opened: May 25, 1970
- Date closed: May 27, 2025
- Location: 15412 Front Beach Rd, Panama City Beach, FL 32413
- Annual visitors: 150,000

Gulf World Marine Park was a dolphinarium located in Panama City Beach, Florida. It was open from 1970 to 2025, and was one of only a few institutes in the United States to house rough-toothed dolphins.

== History ==
Gulf World Marine Park was founded in 1969 by a group of five Alabama businessmen, and they announced their plans to build the park in September of that year. The park's first dolphins, four bottlenose dolphins captured nearby in the Gulf of Mexico, were housed at a motel pool for training. They were moved to Gulf World in the spring of 1970. Gulf World Marine Park opened to the public on Memorial Day of 1970. In 2000, the park underwent an expansion. In 2015, Gulf World Marine Park was acquired by the Dolphin Company, a company that owns a number of swim-with dolphins facilities.

On March 31, 2025, The Dolphin Company, current owner of Gulf World Marine Park, filed for Chapter 11 bankruptcy protection to deal with its debt and financial challenges. Following the deaths of several animals and other concerns, the park closed in May 2025, and the park's website has been removed.

== USDA Inspection (January 2025) ==
In January 2025, a routine USDA inspection of Gulf World Marine Park documented multiple repeat violations of the federal Animal Welfare Act (PST_Inspection_Report_Gulf_World_Marine_Park_Inc.pdf) (PST_Inspection_Report_Gulf_World_Marine_Park_Inc.pdf). The inspection report cited problems in several areas, including structural maintenance of enclosures, water quality management, staffing levels, and cleanliness of animal housing conditions (PST_Inspection_Report_Gulf_World_Marine_Park_Inc.pdf) (PST_Inspection_Report_Gulf_World_Marine_Park_Inc.pdf). A summary of key issues identified in the January 2025 inspection (with any associated corrective action deadlines) is presented in the table below. (For reference, the USDA makes inspection reports available through an online public search tool (USDA Animal Care Search Tool | Animal and Plant Health Inspection Service).)

Issue Category	Description of Violation	Corrective Action Deadline
Facility Maintenance	Multiple primary enclosures for marine mammals were found to be in disrepair, including rusted and chipping surfaces and deteriorating concrete in pools and haul-out areas (potentially posing water contamination or injury risks to the animals) (PST_Inspection_Report_Gulf_World_Marine_Park_Inc.pdf) (PST_Inspection_Report_Gulf_World_Marine_Park_Inc.pdf).	None specified (repeat violation)
Outdoor Shade Provision	Lack of shade over key areas of the dolphin pools (such as feeding and guest interaction zones), forcing dolphins to surface in direct sunlight, which can cause discomfort and has been linked to eye problems in captive marine mammals (PST_Inspection_Report_Gulf_World_Marine_Park_Inc.pdf).	None specified (repeat violation)
Water Quality – Testing	Failure to perform required weekly coliform bacteria tests on the marine mammal pools between Oct. 19 and Nov. 14, 2024, due to lack of testing supplies (PST_Inspection_Report_Gulf_World_Marine_Park_Inc.pdf). Timely water quality testing is mandated to detect harmful bacterial levels.	None specified (repeat violation)
Water Quality – Filtration	Inadequate filtration in dolphin pools: one pool’s filtration system was non-functional (down since Nov 13, 2024) and another was operating at only ~50% capacity, leading to excessive algae growth that reduced visibility in the water (PST_Inspection_Report_Gulf_World_Marine_Park_Inc.pdf) (PST_Inspection_Report_Gulf_World_Marine_Park_Inc.pdf).	Jan 21, 2025 (compliance required)
Staffing Levels	Significant reduction in animal care and maintenance staff (loss of 6 maintenance and 7 animal care employees over three months, leaving only 2 maintenance staff), resulting in insufficient personnel to properly maintain facilities and animal care standards (PST_Inspection_Report_Gulf_World_Marine_Park_Inc.pdf).	Feb 14, 2025 (compliance required)
Sanitation	Unsanitary animal living conditions: African penguins were being kept in an indoor area that functioned as a storage room (with carpeted flooring, equipment and cords, paint supplies, dust and debris), not a proper clean animal housing space (PST_Inspection_Report_Gulf_World_Marine_Park_Inc.pdf).	Jan 21, 2025 (compliance required)

== Exhibits ==
- Dolphin Stadium: Housed 9 bottlenose dolphins and 4 rough-toothed dolphin at closure. The dolphins performed scheduled shows at the stadium, and visitors could pay extra for an up-close encounter with them, or to swim with them.
- Penguin Habitat: Featured African penguins. Visitors could pay extra for an up-close encounter with them.
- Seal Habitat: Featured harbor seals. Visitors could pay extra for an up-close encounter with them.
- Sea Lion Stadium: Featured California sea lions, which performed in scheduled shows daily. Visitors could pay extra for an up-close encounter with them. Previously, the park's four rough-toothed dolphins were also housed here before being moved to Dolphin Stadium.
- Stingray Bay: Housed two species of stingray, cownose rays and Southern stingrays. Visitors could touch and feed the stingrays.
- Tortoise Habitat: Featured African spurred tortoises.
- Tropical Garden Theater: Stadium in which the park's Feathers and Friends Show was held. The show consisted of performances from domestic dogs and cats, as well as a variety of birds and reptiles. The majority of these animals were rescues.
