= Passage Key National Wildlife Refuge =

United States National Wildlife Refuge in Florida

- IUCN category IV (habitat/species management area)
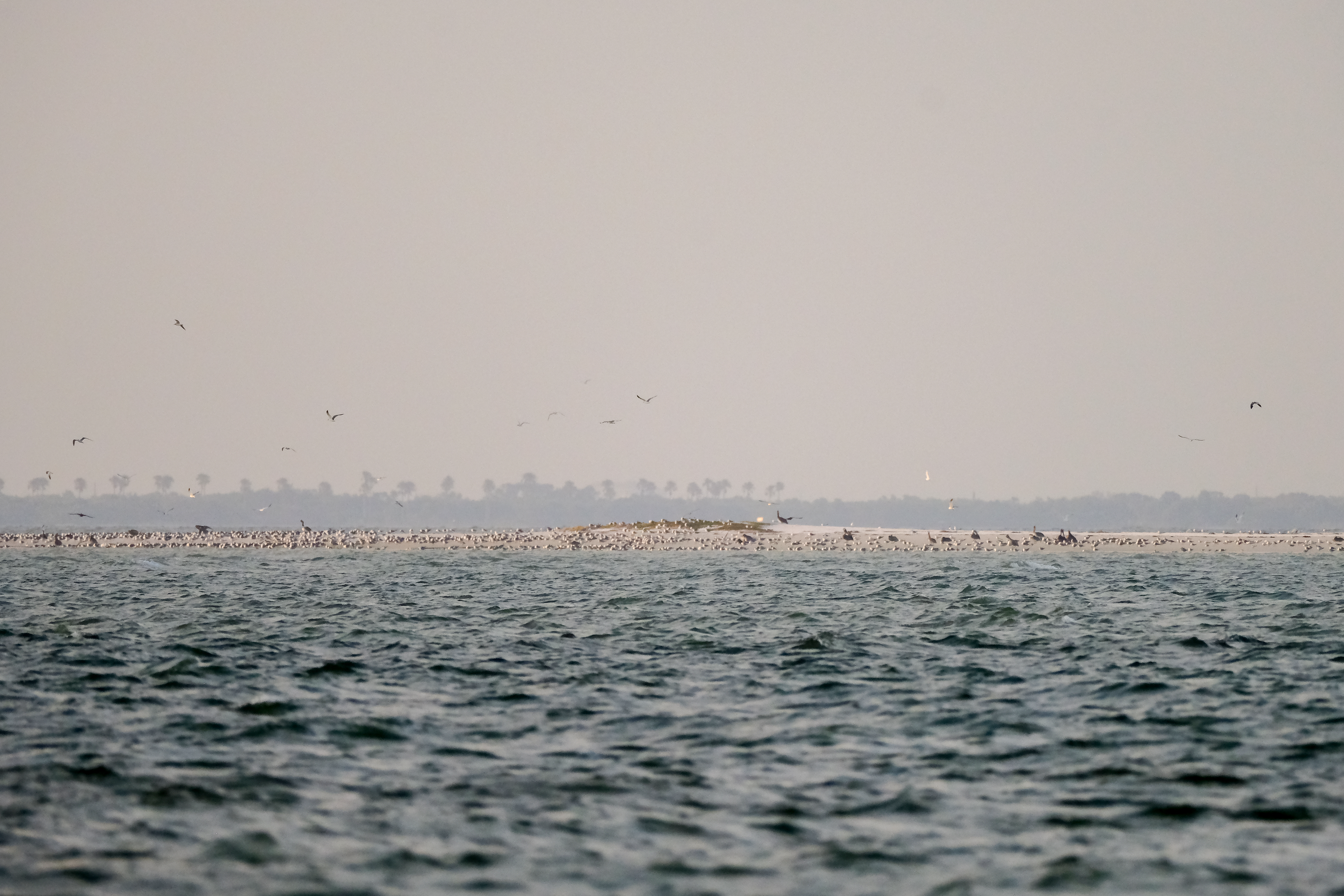
- Passage Key National Wildlife Refuge as seen from nearby Anna Maria Island, Florida

- Location within Florida
- Location: Manatee County, Florida, United States
- Nearest city: Anna Maria, Florida
- Coordinates: 27°33′20″N 82°44′35″W
- Area: 64 acres (0.26 km^{2}) (when established)
- Established: 1905
- Governing body: U.S. Fish and Wildlife Service
- Website: Official website

The Passage Key National Wildlife Refuge is part of the United States National Wildlife Refuge (NWR) System, located offshore from St. Petersburg. The 64-acre (0.26 km^{2}) refuge was established in 1905 by President Theodore Roosevelt to preserve nesting colonies of native seabirds and wading birds. The Passage Key Wilderness Area is part of the refuge, and consists of 36.37 acres (0.1472 km^{2}) (or 56.9%) of its total area. It was established in 1970, to protect native birds and serve as a breeding ground for them.

== Management ==
Passage Key NWR is one of the three 'Tampa Bay Refuges', and was administered as a part of the Chassahowitzka National Wildlife Refuge Complex but was changed to the Crystal River National Wildlife Refuge Complex. The complex manages the Pinellas National Wildlife Refuge, Passage Key National Wildlife Refuge, Chassahowitzka National Wildlife Refuge, Egmont Key National Wildlife Refuge, and the Crystal River National Wildlife Refuge.

== Disappearing island ==
Passage Key has suffered substantial shoaling in recent years and is currently reduced to a small sandbar approximately 100 yards (91 m) long at high tide. It began in 1921 with a hurricane that destroyed a freshwater lake and most of the vegetation. The island, first known as Isla de San Francisco y Leon, then Burnaby Island, and later as Cayo del Pasaje or Passage Key, was a 60 acres (24 ha) barrier island teeming with laughing gulls, royal terns, black skimmers, sandwich terns, brown pelicans and oystercatchers. The hurricanes of 2005 reduced the island to the current state that must be saved or allowed to disappear. Since then, the refuge is closed to all public use.
