= Chassahowitzka National Wildlife Refuge =

US National Wildlife Refuge in Florida

- IUCN category IV (habitat/species management area)
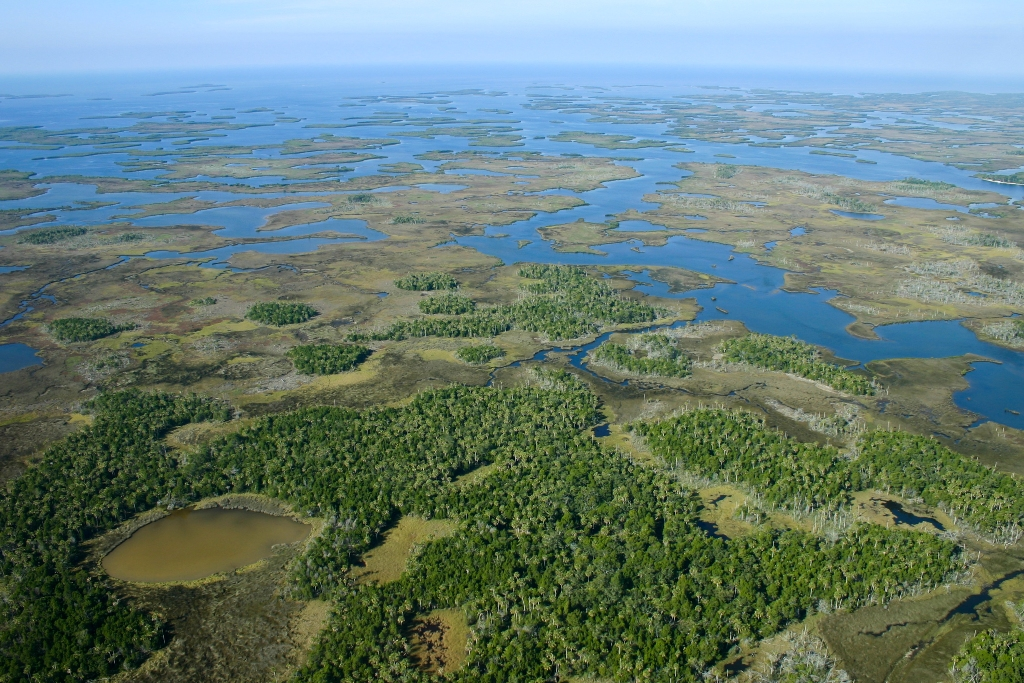
- Aerial view

- Location within the United States Location within Florida
- Location: Citrus County and Hernando County, Florida, United States
- Nearest city: Homosassa, Florida
- Coordinates: 28°41′N 82°41′W
- Area: 31,000 acres (13,000 ha)
- Established: 1941
- Governing body: US Fish & Wildlife Service
- Website: Chassahowitzka National Wildlife Refuge

The 30,843 acres (124.82 km^{2}) Chassahowitzka National Wildlife Refuge is part of the United States National Wildlife Refuge System, located on the west coast of Florida, about 70 miles (110 km) north of St. Petersburg. It is famous as the southern wintering site for the re-introduced eastern population of whooping cranes.

The Chassahowitzka National Wildlife Refuge Complex was changed to the Crystal River Complex, headquartered at Crystal River, Florida, and consists of portions of the Chassahowitzka River and Crystal River, as well as what are known as the Tampa Bay Refuges: Egmont Key, Passage Key and Pinellas.

The Chassahowitzka Wilderness consists of 23,578.93 acres (95.4205 km^{2}) or 76.4% of its total area. Only a portion in the northeast is not designated as wilderness.

In 2001, the Whooping Crane Eastern Partnership raised whooping crane (Grus americana) chicks in Wisconsin's Necedah National Wildlife Refuge then guided them to the Chassahowitzka NWR for the winter. Despite severe mortality from hurricanes in 2007, the re-introduction has been successful and by 2010 there were up to 105 migrating birds established in the eastern United States for the first time in over 100 years.

== Underwater cave systems ==
The refuge contains a number of underwater cave systems, including Buford Sink and Little Gator Siphon.

== See also ==
- Annutteliga Hammock
