= Pinellas National Wildlife Refuge =

Bird refuge in St. Petersburg, Florida

- IUCN category V (protected landscape/seascape)
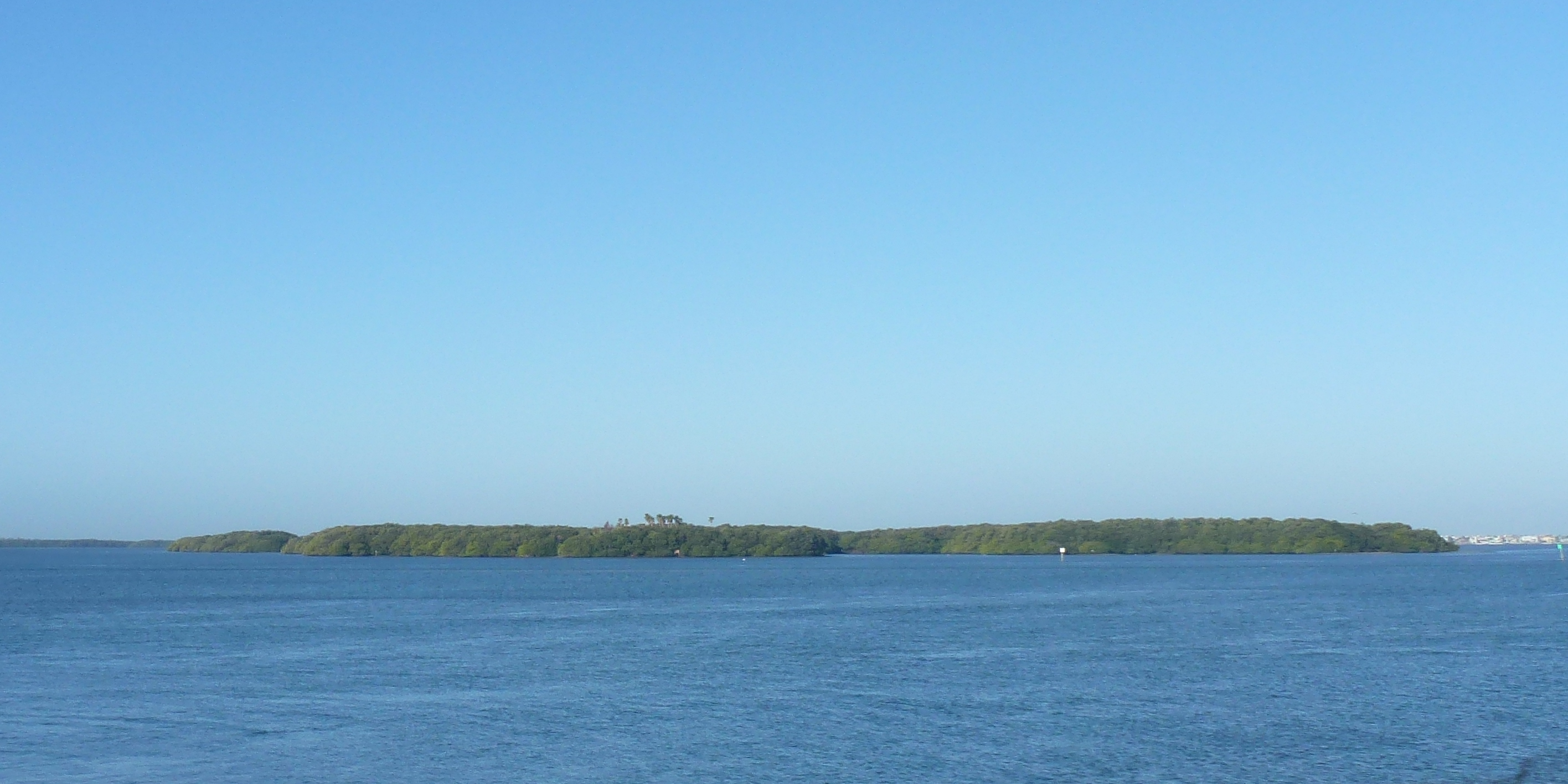
- View from I-275

- Location within Florida Location within the United States
- Location: St. Petersburg, Florida, United States
- Nearest city: St. Petersburg, Florida
- Coordinates: 27°39′59″N 82°41′34″W
- Area: 394 acres (1.59 km^{2})
- Established: 1951
- Governing body: National Park Service
- Website: Pinellas National Wildlife Refuge Archived January 21, 2022, at the Wayback Machine

The Pinellas National Wildlife Refuge is part of the United States National Wildlife Refuge (NWR) System, located offshore from mainland St. Petersburg, Florida, and only accessible by boat. The 394-acre (1.59 km^{2}) refuge was established in 1951, to act as a breeding ground for colonial bird species. Islands within the refuge include Indian, Tarpon, Mule, and Jackass Keys, and all are within the St. Petersburg city limits.

== Management ==
The Pinellas NWR is one of the three 'Tampa Bay Refuges', along with Passage Key NWR and Egmont Key NWR. Previously administered as a part of the Chassahowitzka National Wildlife Refuge Complex, the three Tampa Bay refuges, the Chassahowitzka NWR, and the Crystal River NWR have been administered by the Crystal River Complex, headquartered in Crystal River, Florida since 2012.

== Fauna ==
Brown pelicans, herons, egrets, cormorants and many other species nest on the islands. Tarpon Key has the largest brown pelican rookery in the state.

== Access ==
The NWR is closed to public use, for the protection of natural and cultural resources.
