= Egmont Key State Park and National Wildlife Refuge =

United States National Wildlife Refuge and state park in Florida

Egmont Key State Park & National Wildlife Refuge
- IUCN category IV (habitat/species management area)
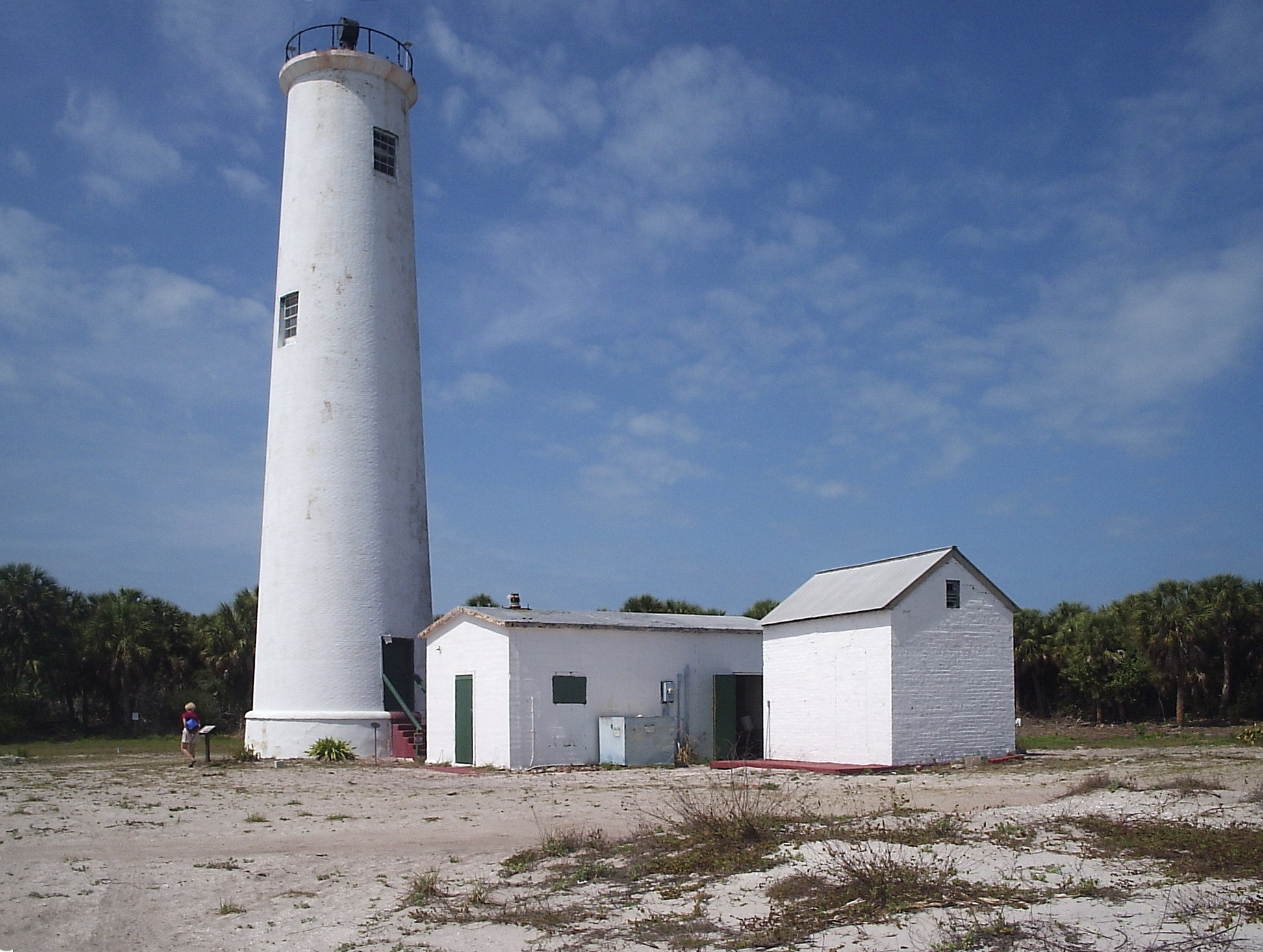
- Egmont Key Light

- Location within Florida Location within the United States
- Interactive map of Egmont Key State Park & National Wildlife Refuge
- Location: Hillsborough County, Florida, United States
- Nearest city: St. Petersburg, Florida
- Coordinates: 27.58625°N 82.761389°W
- Area: 328 acres (1.33 km^{2})
- Established: 1974
- Governing body: Florida Department of Environmental Protection
- Website: Egmont Key State Park
- Egmont Key
- U.S. National Register of Historic Places
- Coordinates: 27°35′24″N 82°45′46″W
- Area: 450 acres (182 ha)
- Built: 1840
- NRHP reference No.: 78000946
- Added to NRHP: December 11, 1978

Egmont Key National Wildlife Refuge and State Park is a National Wildlife Refuge and State Park located on the island of Egmont Key, at the mouth of Tampa Bay. Egmont Key lies southwest of Fort De Soto Park and can only be reached by boat or ferry. Located within Egmont Key National Wildlife Refuge and State Park are the 1858 Egmont Key Lighthouse, maintained by the U.S. Coast Guard, and the ruins of Fort Dade, a Spanish–American War era fort that housed 300 residents. Egmont Key is located in Hillsborough County Florida on a narrow strip of the county that extends along the Tampa Port Shipping Channel.

Egmont Key National Wildlife Refuge was established in 1974. The entire 328 acres (133 ha) island is all part of the Refuge. Egmont Key is one of the three 'Tampa Bay Refuges', along with Passage Key National Wildlife Refuge, and the Pinellas National Wildlife Refuge, that was administered as a part of the Chassahowitzka National Wildlife Refuge Complex but changed to the Crystal River National Wildlife Refuge Complex headquartered in Crystal River, Florida. The complex also manages the Crystal River National Wildlife Refuge and the Chassahowitzka National Wildlife Refuge.

U.S. Fish and Wildlife Service owns and manages Egmont Key National Wildlife Refuge and entered into a cooperative agreement with Florida Park Service to cooperatively manage the entire island in 1989 and is known as Egmont Key National Wildlife Refuge and State Park.

== Registry information ==
Egmont Key was listed as a Military related place of significance in the National Register of Historic Places on December 11, 1978 with reference #78000946. Only 2.75 miles North West from Egmont Key is the Historic Register #100003048 U.S.S. NARCISSUS Tugboat Shipwreck that can be toured.

== Fauna ==
Among the wildlife in the refuge are box turtles, gopher tortoises, dolphins, manatees, and birds such as osprey, brown pelicans, white ibis, royal and sandwich terns, black skimmers, American oystercatchers and laughing gulls. The southern end of Egmont Key and a section of the east beach are closed year-round to all public use to provide nesting habitat for the laughing gulls, terns, white ibis, brown pelicans, and American oystercatchers. These closed areas also provide habitat for birds migrating during the spring and fall and for wintering birds.

== Visiting ==
There are no refuge or state park fees for visiting the island (this is excluding ferry tickets or boat rental fees).

Egmont Key is only accessible by boat and has no drinking water, restrooms, or shops due to the remote nature. Because of this, visitors are advised to bring food and water for their visit. No alcoholic beverages, glass, kites, drones, fireworks, hunting, or pets of any kind are permitted on the island due to the island being a National Wildlife Refuge.

Visitors needing transport to the island can utilize the Egmont Key Ferry Cruise provided by Hubbard's Marina departing from the Bay Pier located within Fort De Soto. The ferry departs daily at 10am and 11am for a 4 hour trip; 3 hours on the island and 30 minutes travel each way. On Tuesday, Thursday, Saturday, and Sunday there is also a 2pm ferry. Ferry tickets are $45.00 for adults 12 and up, $25.00 for youth ages 3–11, and free for those under age 3. Snorkeling gear can also be rented.

GPS coordinates include:

- Ranger Station: N 27 36. 032 W 82 45. 623
- Lighthouse: N 27 36. 047 W 82 45. 634
- Fort Dade: 27.5953° N, 82.7637° W

== Recreational activities ==
Activities include sunbathing, swimming, shelling (shell collecting - collecting of live shells is prohibited), boating, picnicking, snorkeling, and wildlife viewing within designated areas. Visitors can also tour the fort ruins and gun batteries. The lighthouse is no longer open to the public due to safety concerns. A visitor center, staffed by volunteers, is located in the guardhouse and is open on special occasions. Amenities include beaches, nature trails, and picnic tables.

== Hours ==
Egmont Key is open 365 days a year from 8am until sunset.

== History ==
Egmont Key became an island around 11,000 years ago, separated from the mainland by the rising coastline. The Tocobaga tribe had a persistent but impermanent presence on the island, as evidenced by the discovery of arrowheads and spear points. A Spanish surveyor found an abandoned canoe, presumably Tocobaga, on the island in 1757. Spanish incursions and the collapse of the Tocobaga population, however, meant that their presence on the islands ended in the late 1700s.

Spanish surveyors first mapped the island in the 1750s, naming it Isla de San Blas y Barreda, in honor of a Cuban official. Following the transfer of Florida to the British in 1763, a mapper commissioned by the English returned to Tampa Bay, and named the island Egmont, in honor of the Lord Egmont, who was at the time the First Lord of the British Admiralty.

As with the rest of Florida, Egmont Key transitioned between rule by Spain and England multiple times before finally becoming part United States in 1821. In 1847, concerns with hazardous navigation at the mouth of Tampa Bay led to the construction of the first lighthouse, but the Great Gale of 1848 swamped the island and all but destroyed the original lighthouse. The lighthouse keeper reportedly rode out the storm in a rowboat tied to a palmetto. After the storm had passed, the keeper rowed to Fort Brooke and tendered his resignation. In 1858, the lighthouse was replaced with the lighthouse that still stands today.

During the 19th century, Egmont Key was used as a camp for captured Seminoles at the end of the Third Seminole War and later in the century the island was occupied by the Union Navy during the American Civil War. Defense considerations during the Spanish–American War led to the construction of Fort Dade on the island in 1898, and Egmont Key remained a military reservation until 1923.

Coast Defenses of Tampa
Batteries	No. Guns	Weapon/Mount	Location	Remarks
Battery Laidley	8	12" Mortar	Fort De Soto	Partially disarmed 1921
Battery McIntosh	2	8" Gun, Disappearing Carriage	Fort Dade	Disarmed 1923
Battery Howard	2	6" Gun, Disappearing Carriage	Fort Dade	Disarmed 1926
Battery Burchsted	2	6" Armstrong Gun, Pedestal Mount	Fort Dade	Disarmed 1919
Battery Burchsted	1	3" Gun, Masking Pedestal Mount	Fort Dade	Disarmed 1920
Battery Bigelow	2	3" Gun, Masking Pedestal Mount	Fort De Soto	Disarmed 1920
Battery Mellon	3	3" Gun, Masking Pedestal Mount	Fort Dade	Disarmed 1920
Battery Page	2	3" Gun, Pedestal Mount	Fort Dade	Disarmed 1919

In 1928, Pan Am's first crash occurred in the Gulf of Mexico near Egmont. On August 15 that year, a Fokker/Atlantic F.VIIIb/3m that was turned into a "C-2 Tri-motor", General Machado (NC55 or 53), was operating a Pan Am flight from Havana to Key West, when it became lost and ditched off of the island after running out of fuel. 1 of the 5 occupants, Norman Ageton, died. The plane had been originally built as a F.VIIIb/3m for Colonial Air Transport.

U.S. Fish and Wildlife Service owns and manages Egmont Key National Wildlife Refuge and entered into a cooperative agreement with Florida Park Service to cooperatively manage the entire island in 1989 and is known as Egmont Key National Wildlife Refuge and State Park.

In 1974, the U.S. Fish and Wildlife Service took over Egmont Key. In 1989 they turned the island over to the State of Florida and it became a state park. After a yearslong effort, the jail structure from Fort Dade was rebuilt and repurposed as a visitors' center for the park in the early 2000s. The structure was designed to resemble the original as closely as possible and featured Ludowici tiles from the original manufacturer. Budgetary concerns in 2009 led to a proposal to close the park.

== Harbor pilot station ==
Since 1926, Egmont Key has been the location of the Tampa Bay Pilot Association's Pilot Station operation guiding ship traffic safely into and out of the port of Tampa, protecting the wildlife and environment from damage.

== Gallery ==
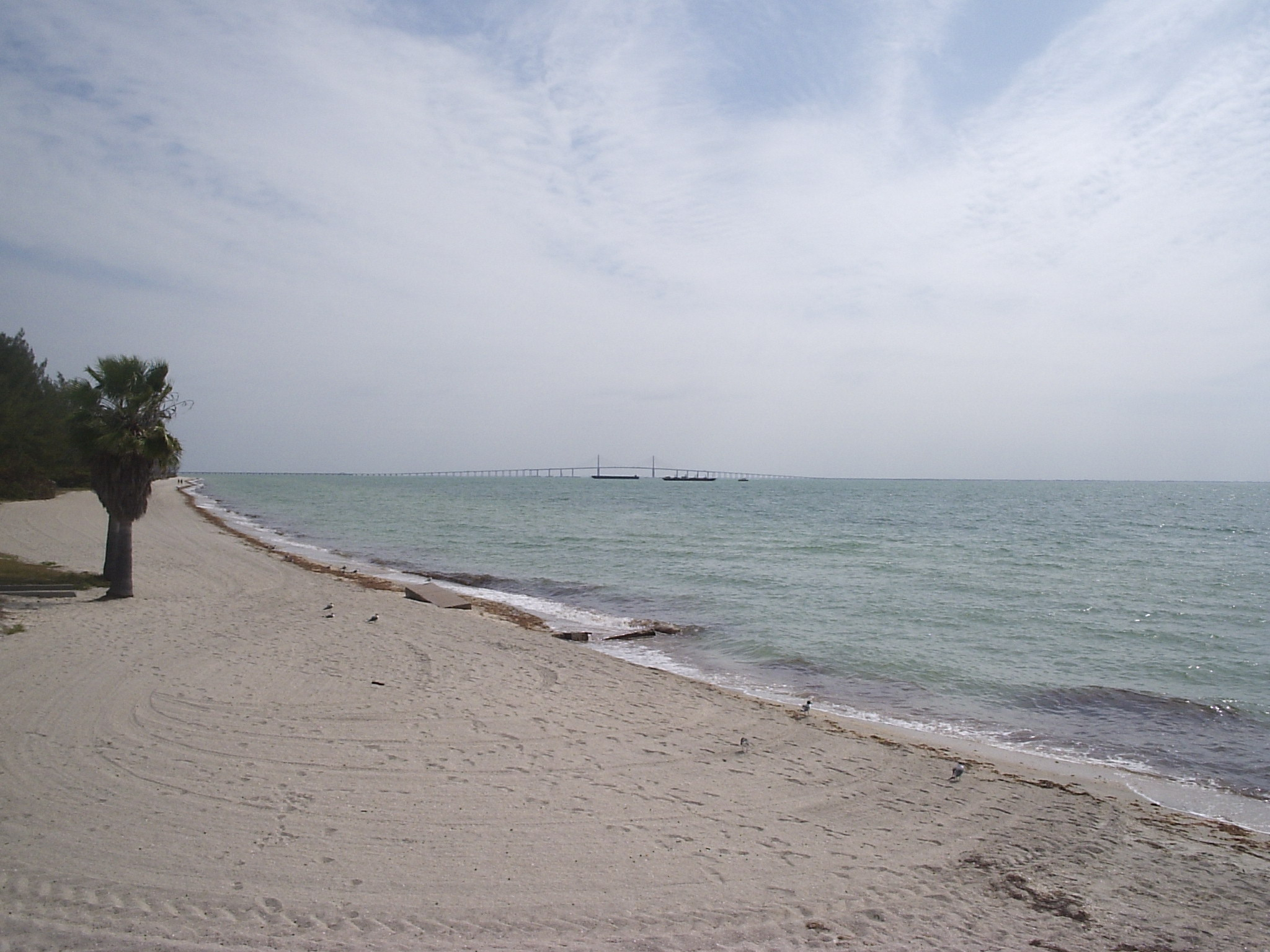
Beach on east side of island. Sunshine Skyway Bridge in background.

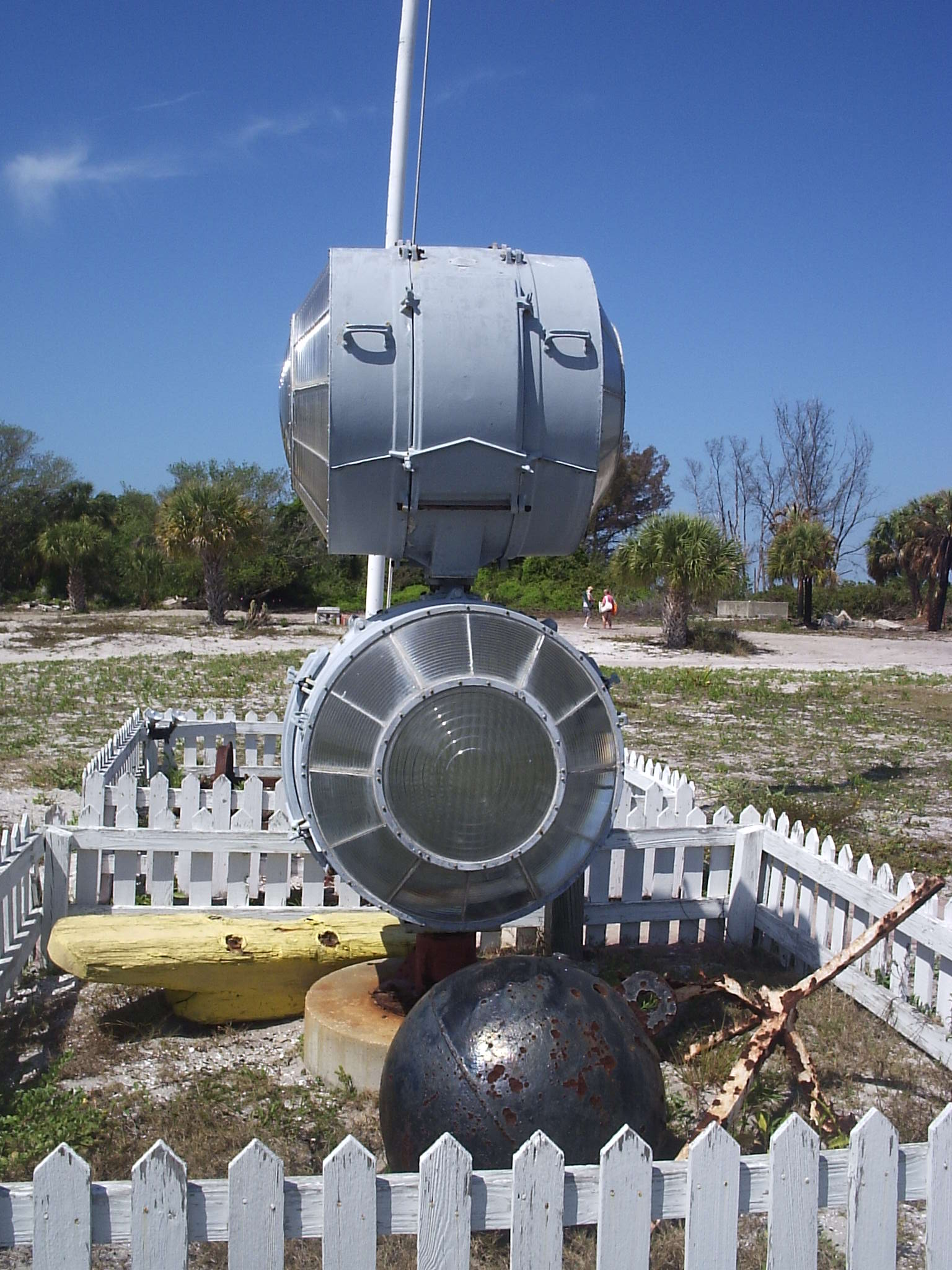
Aerobeacon lenses from old light.

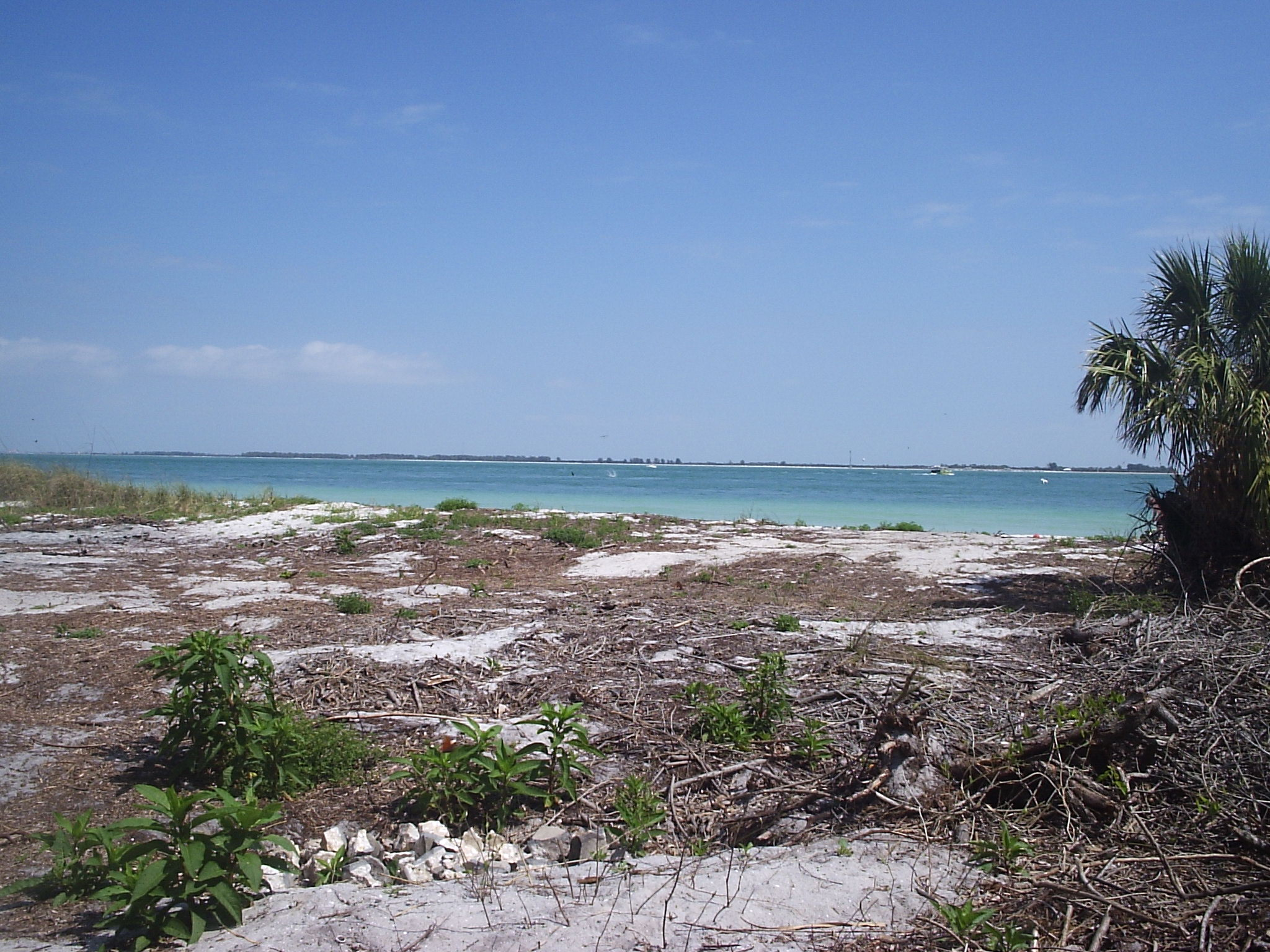
View looking east toward Fort De Soto Park.

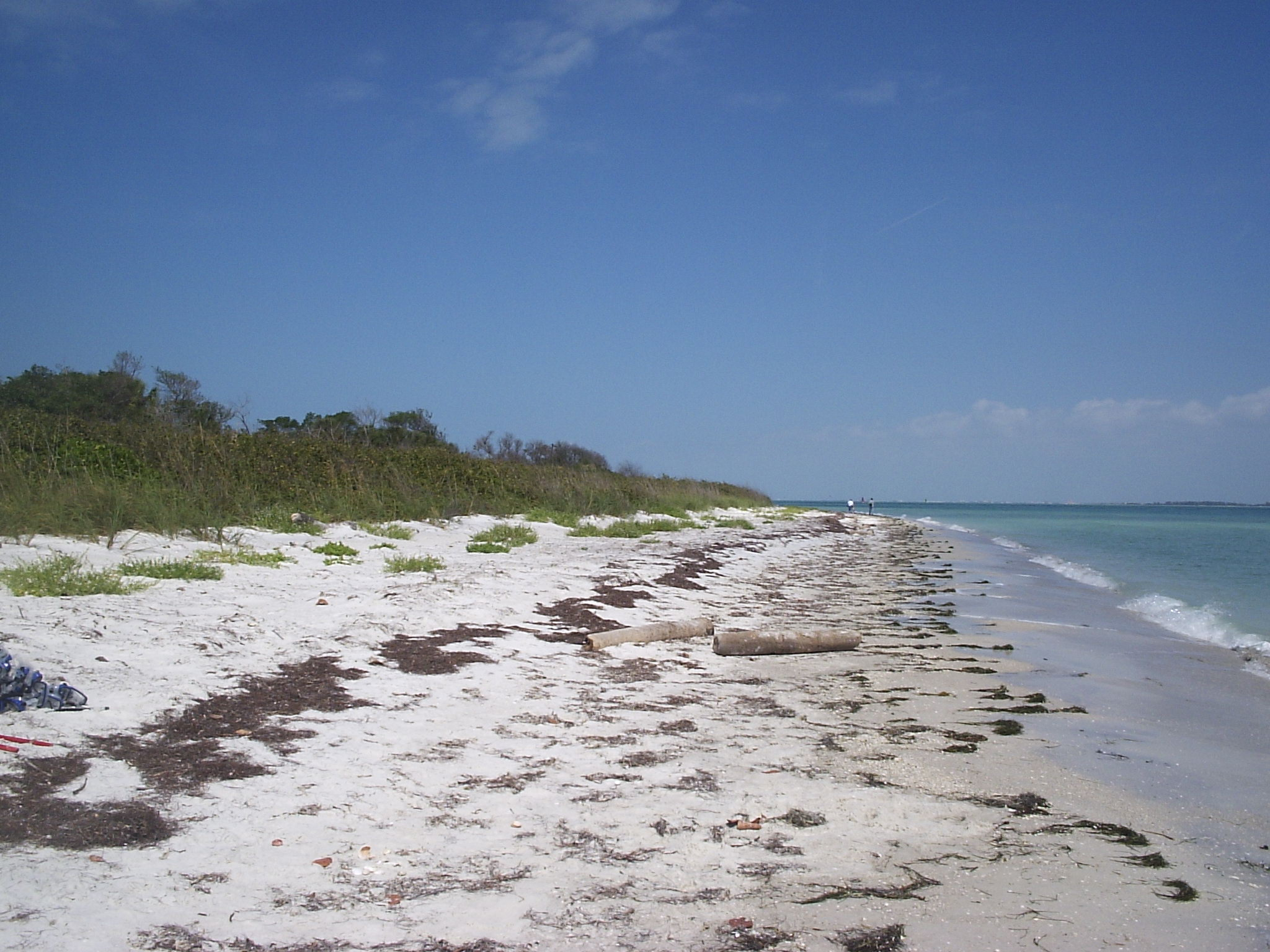
Looking north along eastern beach of Egmont Key.

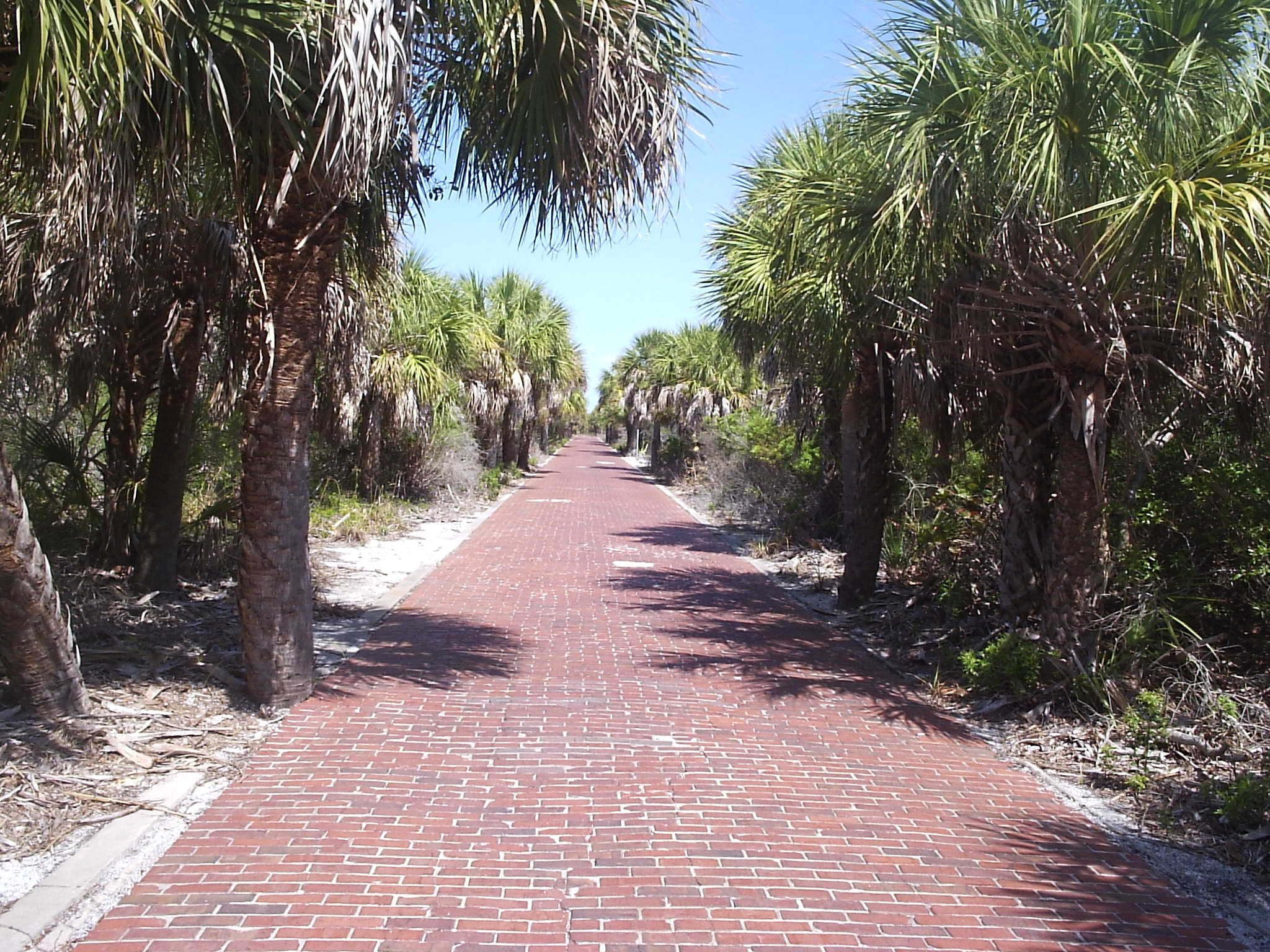
Brick road, Fort Dade ruins.

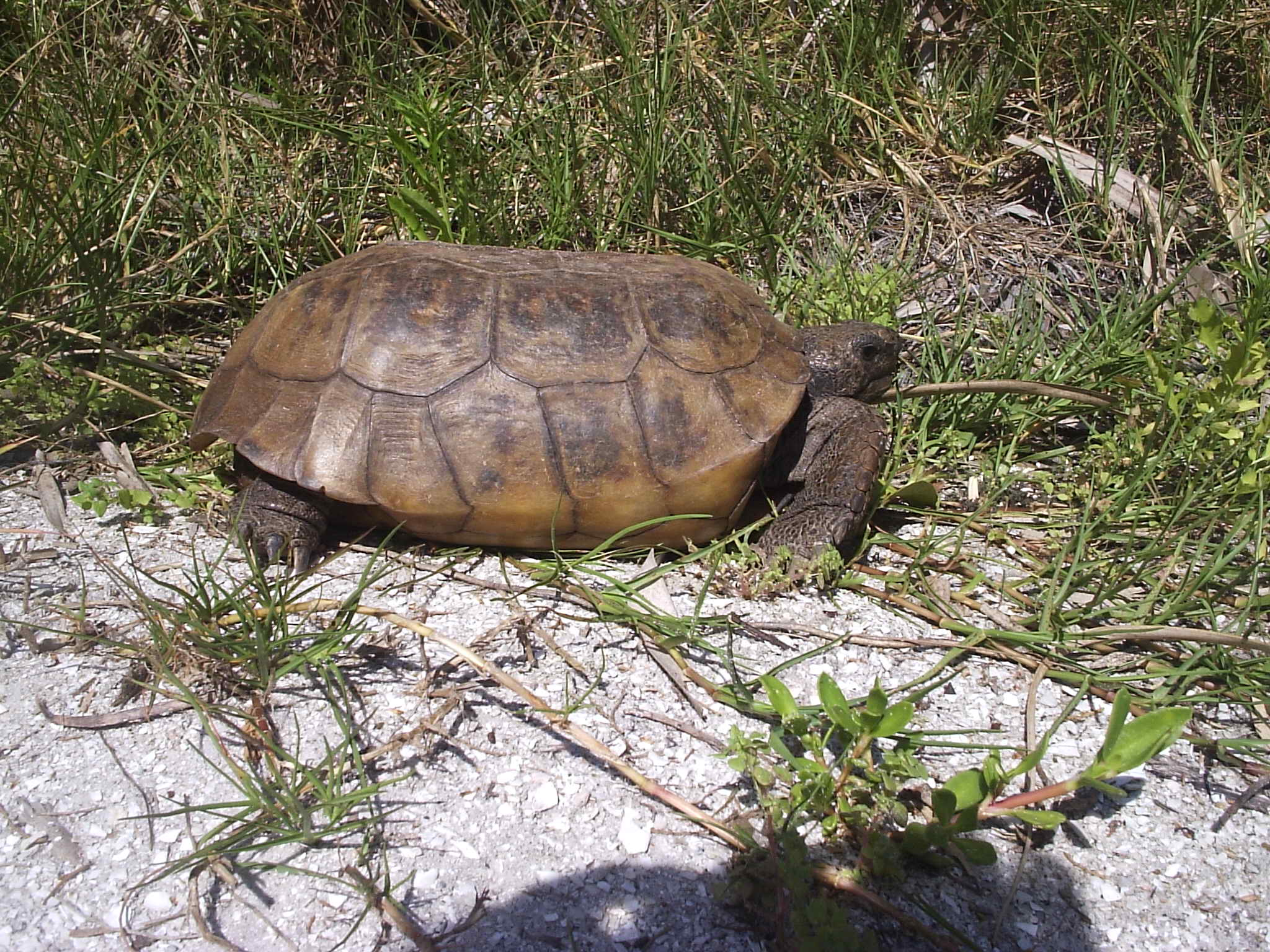
Gopher tortoise by nature trail.

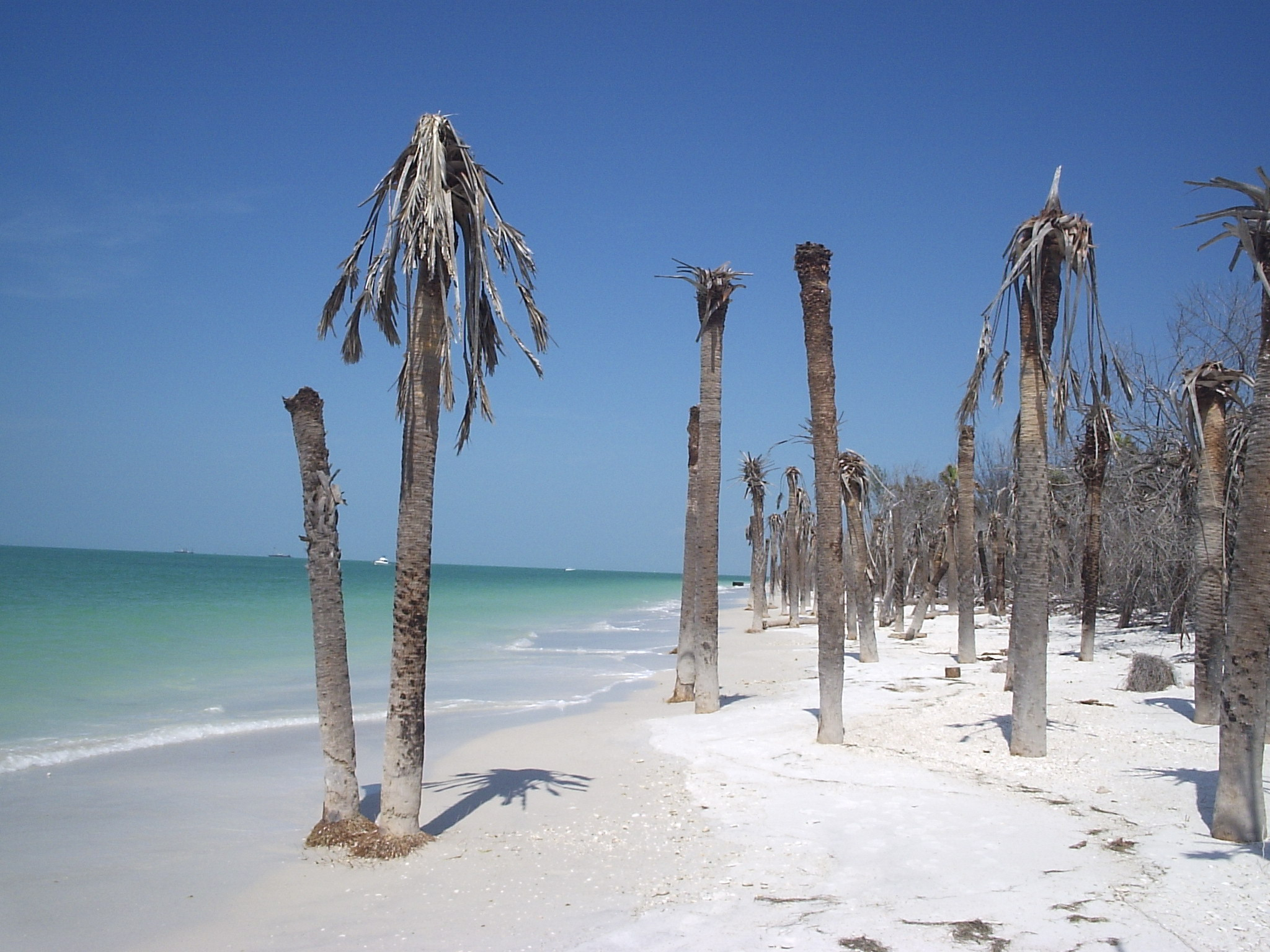
Beach with dead palm trees on west side of island.

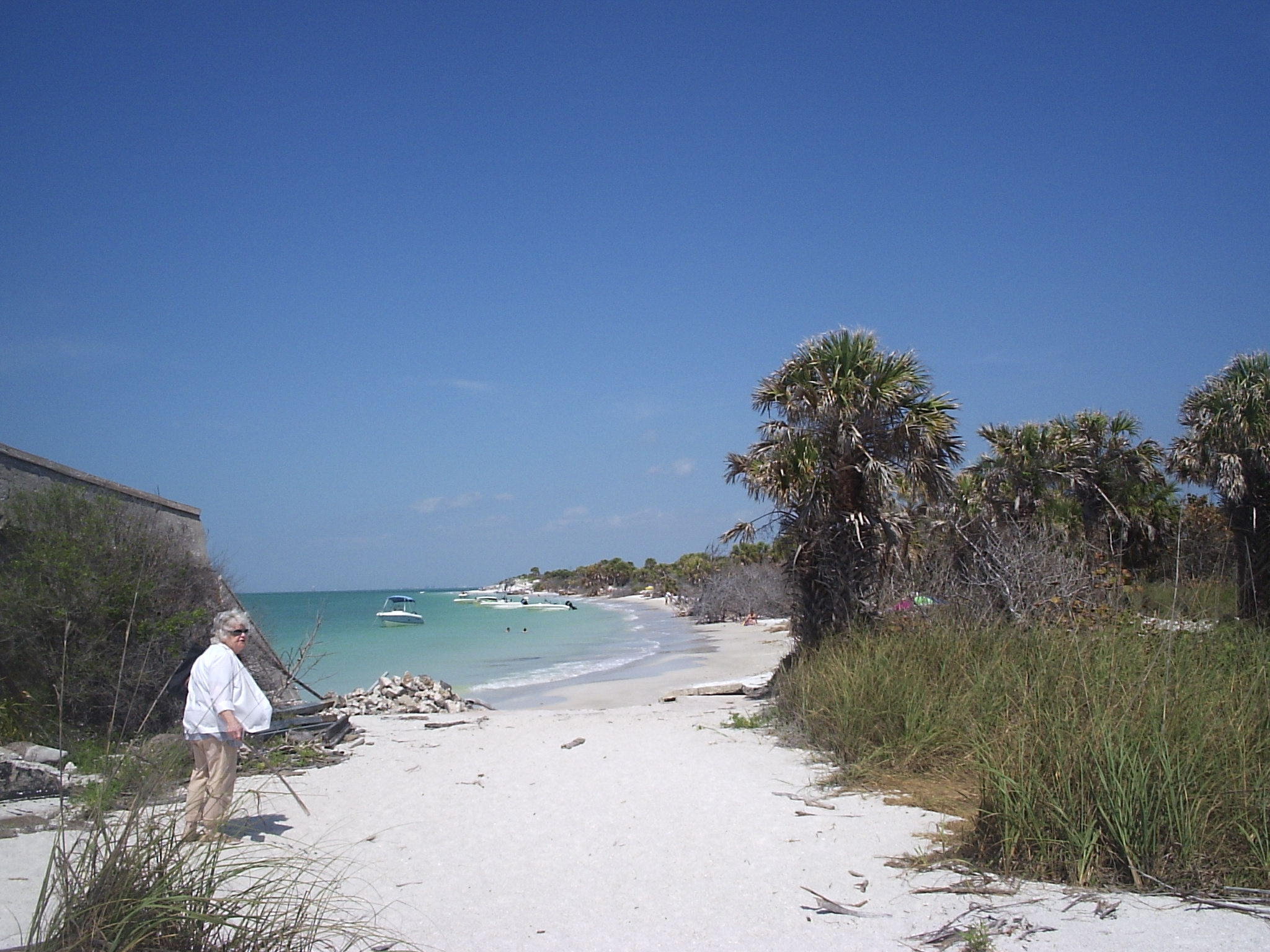
West side of island.

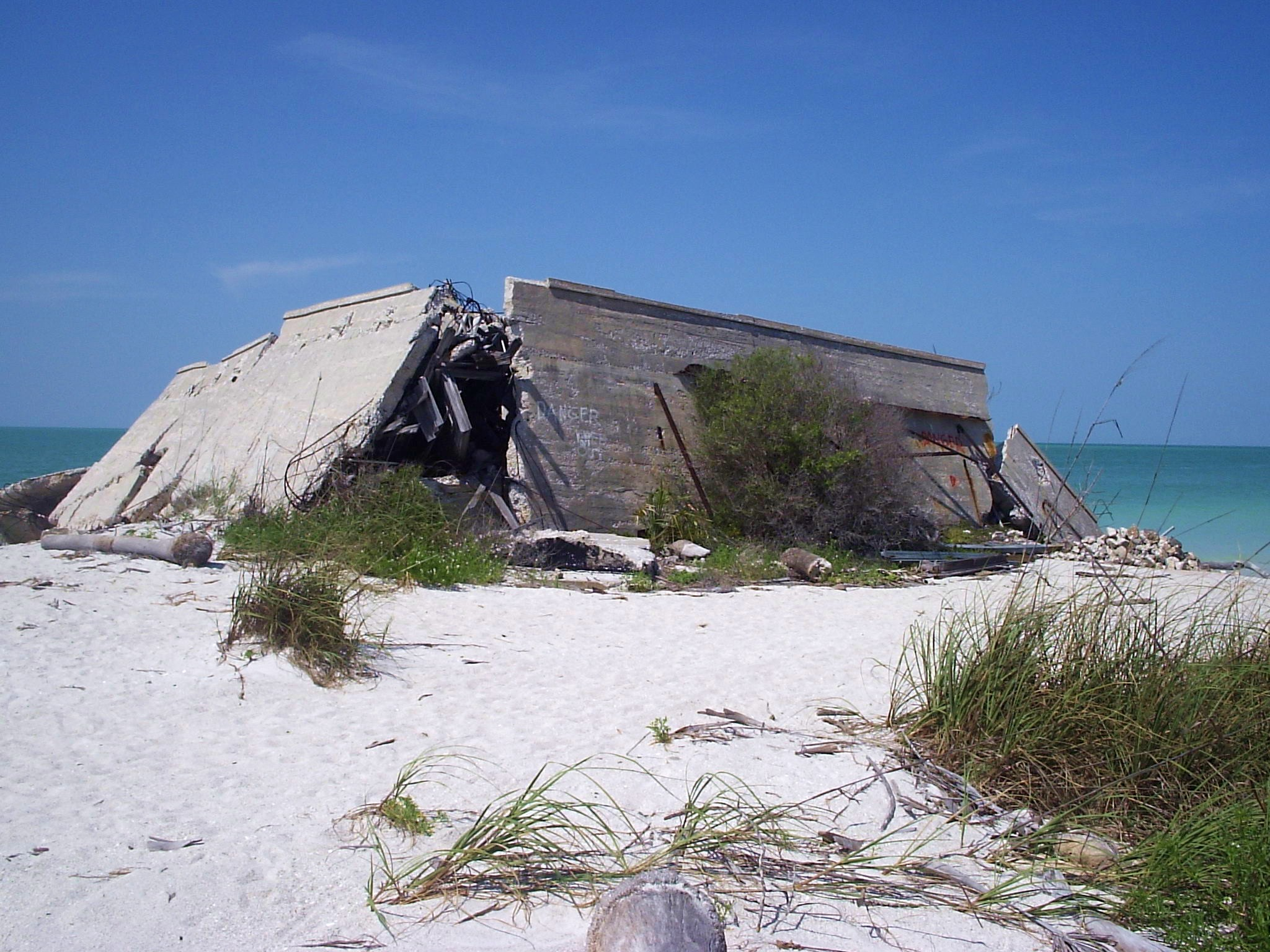
Ruins on west side of island.

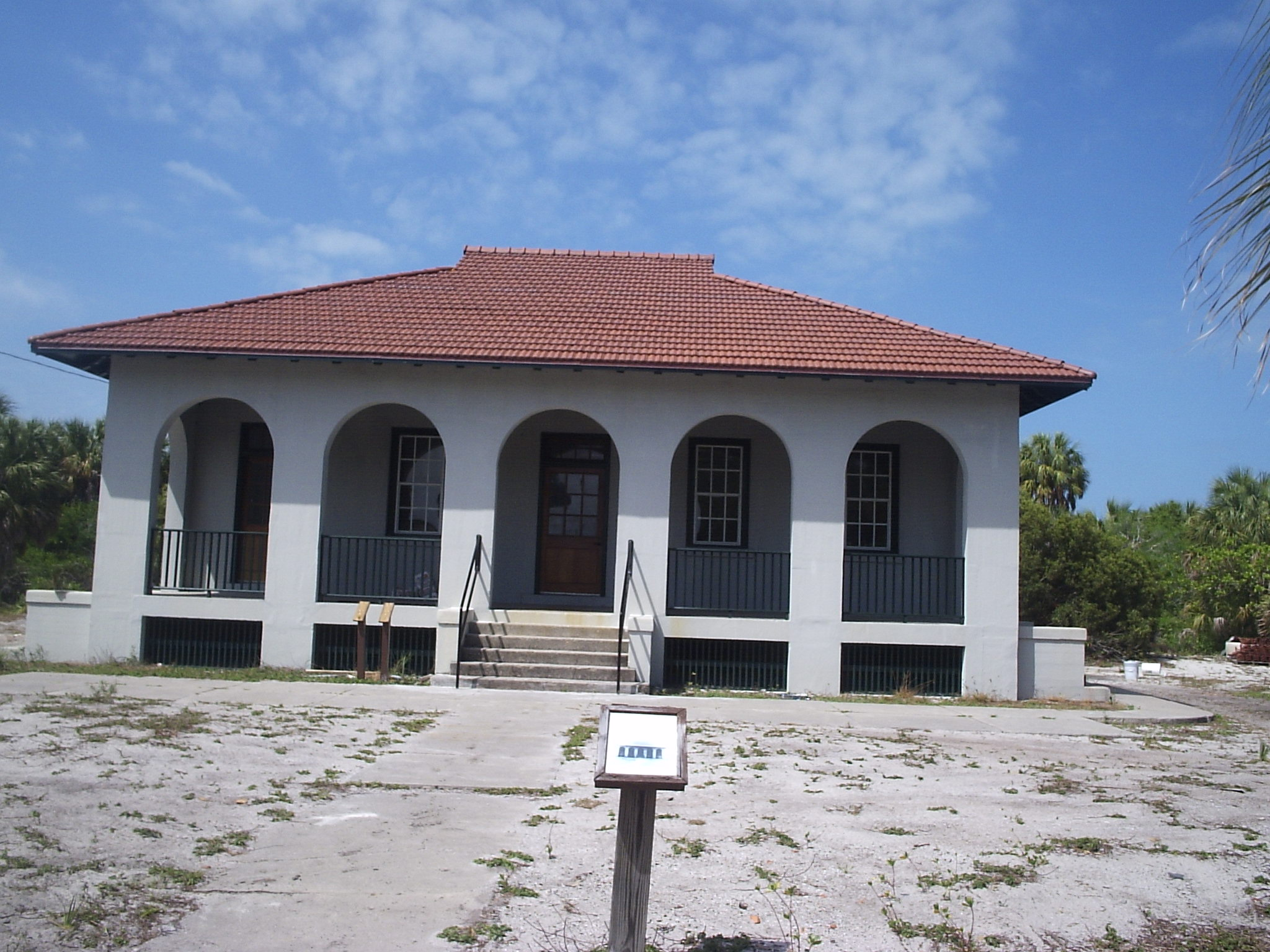
Reconstructed Guardhouse, Fort Dade

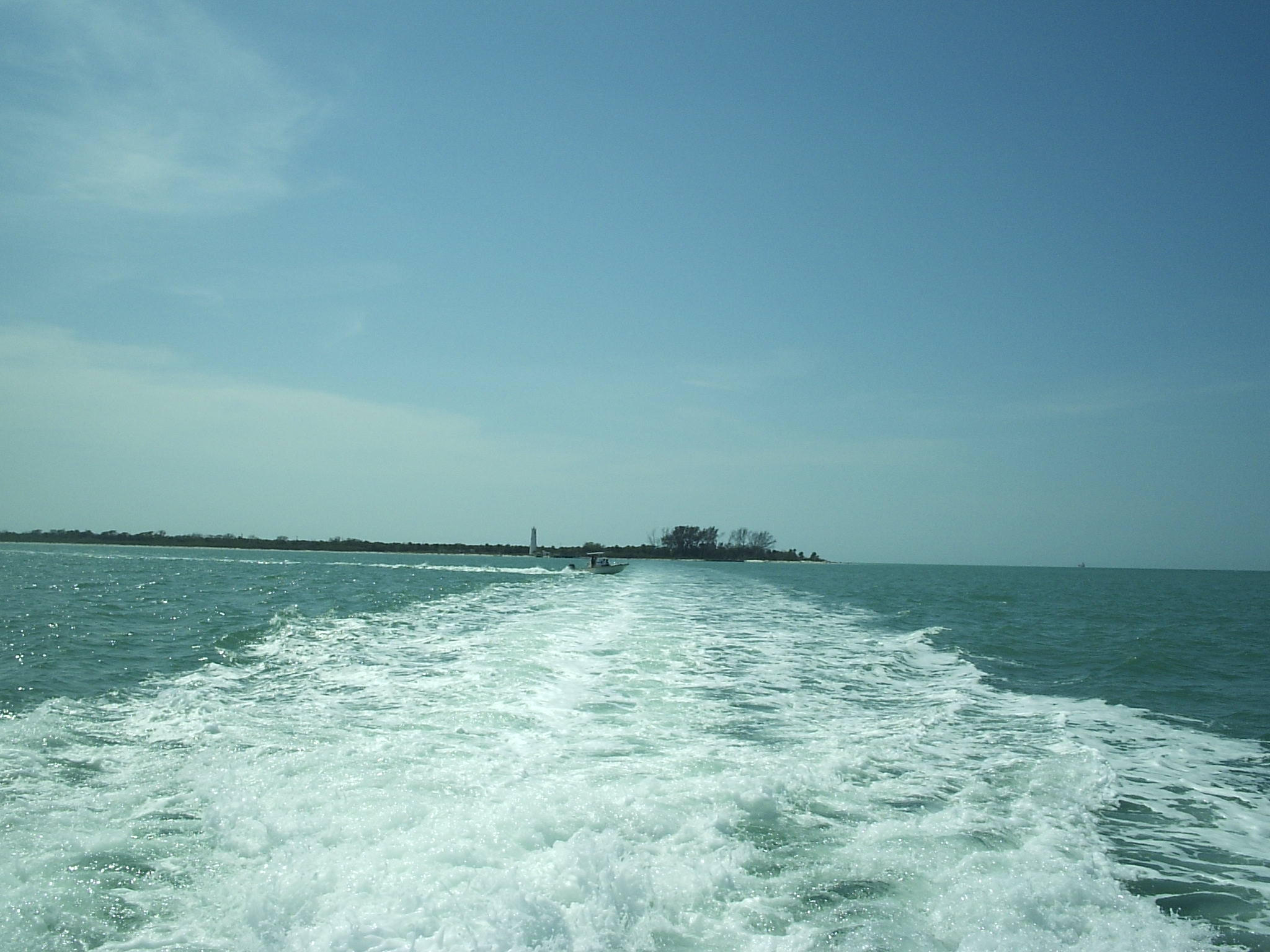
Egmont Key from ferry
