= Egmont Key Light =

Lighthouse in Florida, United States

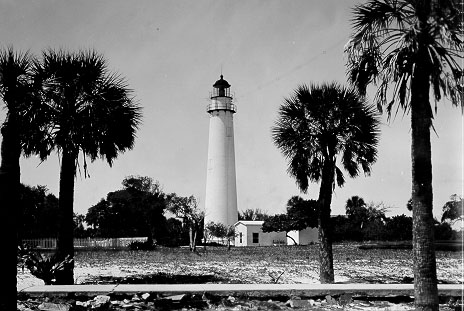
- The Egmont Key Lighthouse before its lantern was removed in 1944
- Location: north end of Egmont Key; Tampa Bay; Fort DeSoto Park; Florida; United States
- Coordinates: 27°36′03″N 82°45′38.5″W

Tower
- Constructed: 1848 (first)
- Foundation: stone basement
- Construction: brick tower
- Automated: 1990
- Height: 87 feet (27 m)
- Shape: tapered cylindrical tower with balcony and lantern removed
- Markings: white tower
- Operator: Egmont Key State Park

Light
- First lit: 1858 (second)
- Focal height: 85 feet (26 m)
- Lens: third-order Fresnel lens (1858) fourth-order Fresnel lens (1866) third-order Fresnel lens with red sector (1893); DCB-24 aerobeacon (current)
- Range: 24 nmi (44 km; 28 mi)
- Characteristic: Fl W 15s.

The current Egmont Key Light dates from 1858. It is the oldest structure in the Tampa Bay area still used for its original purpose.

== The lighthouse ==
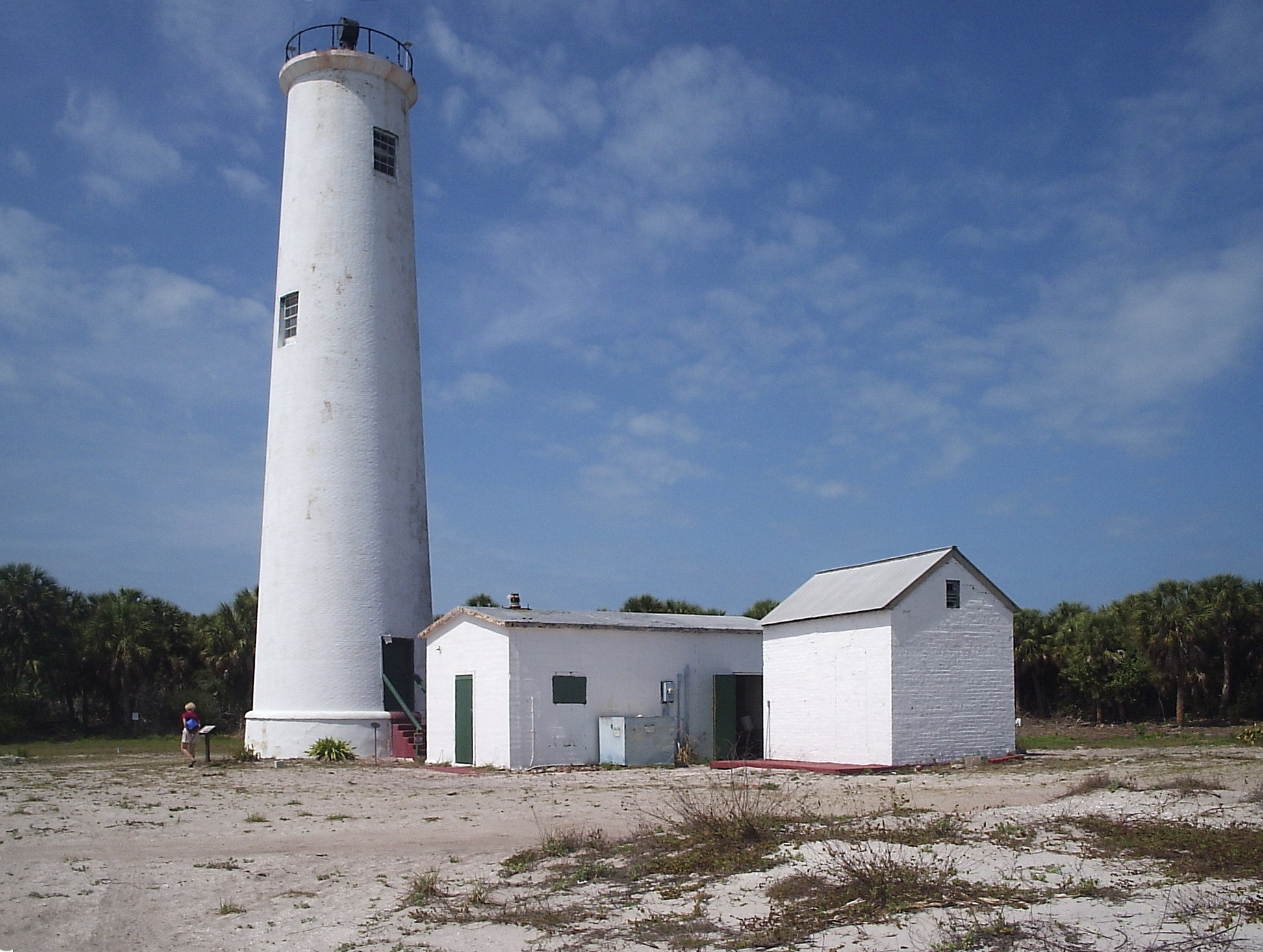
Egmont Key Lighthouse at Egmont Key State Park

When the first Egmont Key Light was built in 1848, it was the only lighthouse on the Gulf coast of Florida between Key West and St. Marks. In September 1848 a hurricane covered the island with six feet of water and damaged the new lighthouse. The keeper and his family rode out the storm in a small boat tied to a tree. When the keeper saw the damage to the lighthouse, he rowed off to Tampa and never returned. Another hurricane a few weeks later caused more damage, and beach erosion threatened to topple the tower. A hurricane in 1852 again threatened to topple the tower by undermining it. In 1857 work was begun rebuilding the tower. It apparently was moved 90 feet (27 m) inland at that time. The reconstruction was completed in 1858, and the lighthouse was placed back in service with a new third order Fresnel lens. The lens was removed by Confederates during the Civil War to frustrate the Union Navy efforts to blockade Tampa Bay but was restored after the war.

In 1944 the lantern was removed from the lighthouse tower and replaced with an aerobeacon. The Coast Guard continued to man the lighthouse until 1990, when it became one of the last lighthouses in the United States to be automated. Beach erosion has again threatened the lighthouse, and sand was pumped into the beach in front of the tower in 2000. In 2001 the Coast Guard announced plans to deactivate the light, but as of July, 2016 has not done so. The Coast Guard has declared the lighthouse surplus property, and turned it over to the General Services Administration to be sold.

== The key ==
Egmont Key as a whole has a rich history. The entire island is on the National Register of Historic Places, and is a National Wildlife Refuge and a state park. At the time the first lighthouse was being built in 1848, Colonel Robert E. Lee was making a survey of the southern coast, and recommended that defensive works be built on Egmont Key because of its strategic location. In the 1850s Egmont Key was used as a temporary holding area for Seminoles before they were shipped to the Indian Territory. Many of them perished while being held captive and are buried at the location. Early in the Civil War, Confederate blockade-runners used the island as a base. Union forces captured the island in July 1861 and used it as a base for attacks on Confederate ships and positions in the Tampa area. The Union also used the island as a military prison and a refuge for southern pro-Union sympathizers. A cemetery for Union and Confederate dead was opened on the island in 1864. The cemetery was closed in 1909 and the bodies were moved to military cemeteries at other locations.

== Fort Dade ==
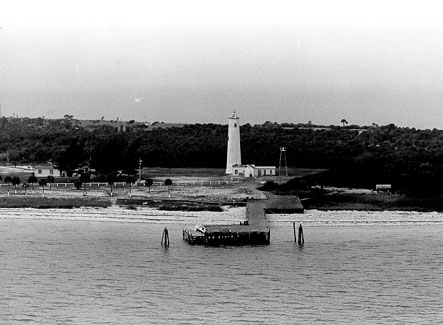
Egmont Key Lighthouse without lantern, U.S. Coast Guard Archive

At the start of the Spanish–American War, Fort Dade (named for Major Francis L. Dade, who was killed in a battle in the Second Seminole War) was established on Egmont Key to protect Tampa Bay from a Spanish attack. It consisted of several coastal artillery batteries protecting the main ship channel into Tampa Bay, as well as a secondary channel to the south of the island. A hospital at Fort Dade was used to quarantine all American soldiers returning from Cuba for ten days. During World War I Fort Dade was used as a training center for National Guard Coast Artillery Units. The fort was deactivated in 1921. Egmont Key was put to military use again during World War II, as a harbor patrol station and an ammunition storage facility.

== Head keepers ==
- Sherrod Edwards (1847–1850)
- N. Alston Jameson (1850–1851)
- John F. Hagan (1851–1853)
- John Butler (1853–1856)
- Frederick Tresca (1856–1860)
- George V. Rickard (1860–1861)
- William S. Spencer (1866)
- William T. Coons (1866–1876)
- Walter S. Burgess (1876–1878)
- Charles Moore (1878–1910)
- John Peterson (1910–1911)
- George H. Gibson (1911 – at least 1921)
- Cody W. McKeithen (at least 1930 – at least 1940)
- James Flannagan (at least 1987), Mark Allen ( – 1989)

== See also ==
- List of lighthouses in Florida
- List of lighthouses in the United States
