= Crystal River =

Crystal River may refer to the following places in the United States of America:

- Crystal River, Florida, a small city in Florida
- Crystal River (Florida), a river near the small city of the same name
- Crystal River (Colorado), a tributary of the Roaring Fork River in Colorado
- Crystal River (Michigan), a stream located in northern Michigan's Lower Peninsula
- Crystal River Archaeological State Park in Florida
- Crystal River Energy Complex in Florida
- Crystal River Nuclear Plant in Florida, a part of the Crystal River Energy Complex
- Crystal River National Wildlife Refuge, a National Wildlife Refuge in Florida
- Crystal River, a river and tributary of the Tomorrow/Waupaca River, in Central Wisconsin
