= Crystal River National Wildlife Refuge =

United States National Wildlife Refuge in Florida

- IUCN category IV (habitat/species management area)
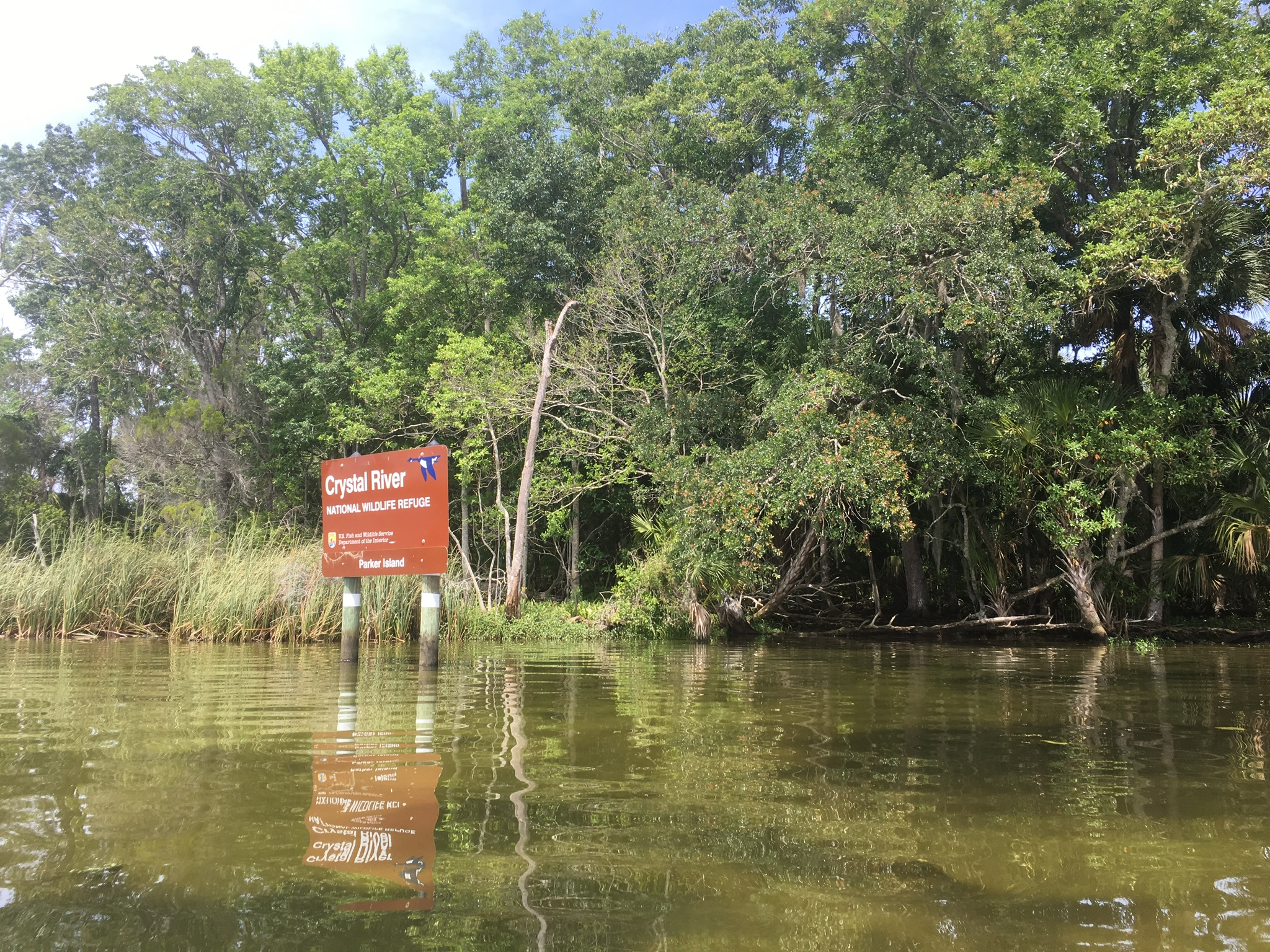
- View of the waterfront

- Location within the United States
- Location: Citrus County, Florida, United States
- Nearest city: Crystal River, Florida
- Coordinates: 28°53′15″N 82°36′00″W
- Area: 80 acres (32 ha)
- Established: 1983
- Governing body: U.S. Fish and Wildlife Service
- Website: www.fws.gov/refuge/crystal-river

The Crystal River National Wildlife Refuge is part of the United States National Wildlife Refuge (NWR) System, located in Kings Bay, in the town of Crystal River, and consists of 20 islands and several small parcels of land. The 80-acre (32 ha) refuge (only accessible by boat) was established in 1983, to protect the West Indian manatee.

== History ==
Originally named the Crystal River Manatee sanctuary. The history of the Crystal River National Wildlife Refuge goes back before it was established in 1983. Prior to 1983 there were local advocates proposing the refuge be created to protect the Florida manatees within. Then in 1983 the U.S fish and wildlife services established the refuge to protect manatees that enter the springs to keep warm during the winter.

== Management ==
The Crystal River NWR administration was changed from the Chassahowitzka National Wildlife Refuge Complex to the Crystal River Complex headquartered in Crystal River, Florida. The complex manages Chassahowitzka National Wildlife Refuge, Crystal River Preserve State Park, as well as the three 'Tampa Bay Refuges'; Egmont Key NWR, Passage Key NWR, and the Pinellas NWR.

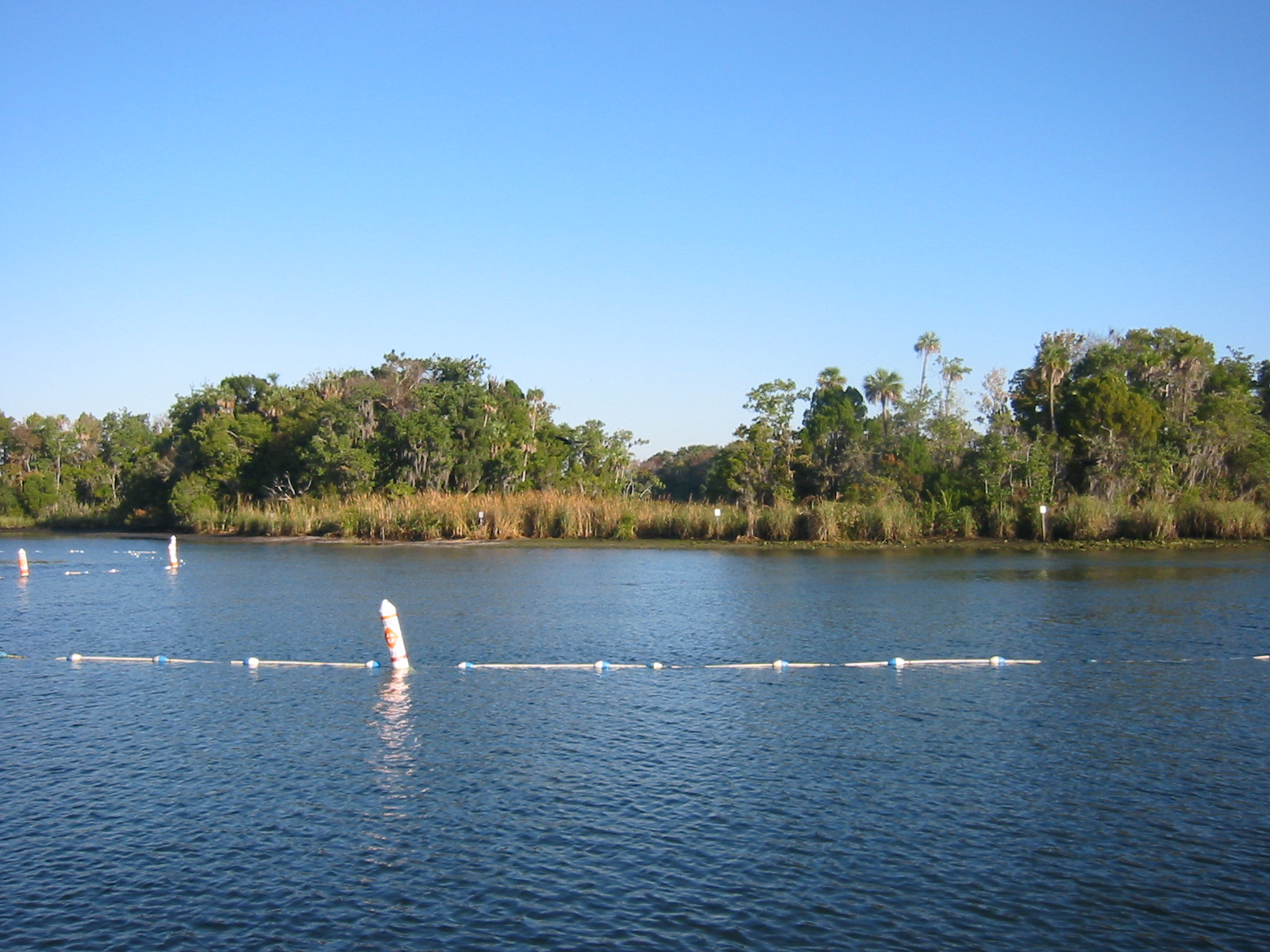
This is the Kings Spring area. The area behind the buoys and ropes is a manatee sanctuary, where snorkelers and boaters are forbidden to enter.

== Visitor guidelines ==
During the winter months, parts of the Crystal River National Wildlife Refuge are subject to seasonal access restrictions to protect manatees. The refuge’s springs release 72°F (22°C) water, attracting large numbers of Florida manatees during colder months. To protect the manatees from injury or disturbance, certain areas are closed to the public during these times.

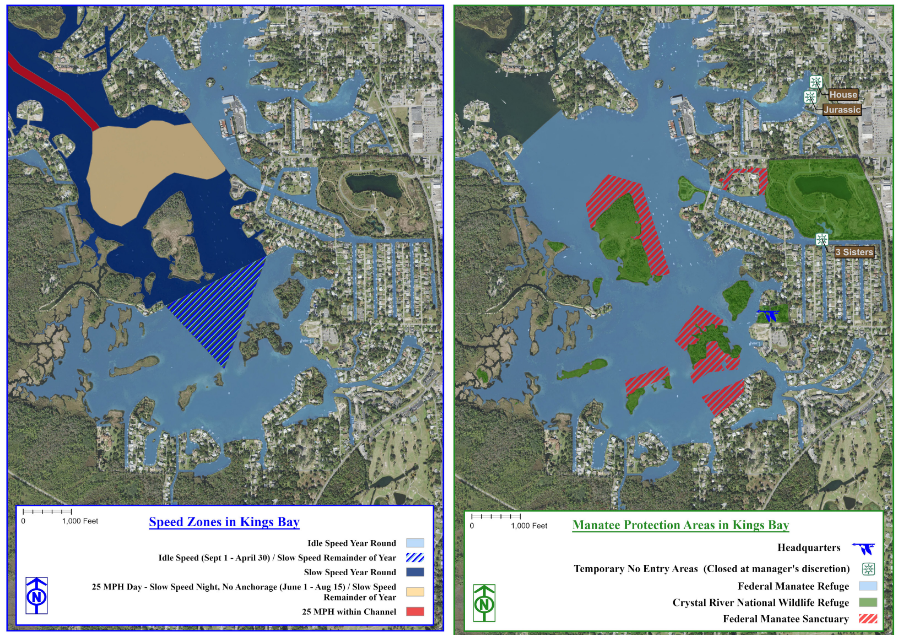
map displaying speed zones and manatee protection areas in kings bay

== Other efforts ==
Other than the initial efforts to protect manatees the Crystal River NWR, U.S Fish and wildlife services has expanded to restoring other animal populations that are decreasing, along with managing invasive species.
