= Haycock =

Haycock may refer to:

== Places ==
- Haycock Island, an island in Queensland, Australia
- Haycock Township, Bucks County, Pennsylvania, United States
- Haycock, Alaska, United States
- Haycock, Virginia, United States
- Haycock Airport, an airport in Haycock, Alaska, United States
- Haycock (Lake District), a hill in the English Lake District
- Haycock Mountain, a hill in Bucks County, Pennsylvania, United States
- Haycock Mountain, Utah, a mountain located in Garfield County, Utah near Panguitch Lake, with an elevation of approximately 9,000 feet. Homesteaded by Joseph Haycock.

== Other uses ==
- Haycock (surname)
- Haystack
