= Heycock =

Heycock is a surname. Notable people with the surname include:

- Caroline Heycock, Scottish syntactician and professor
- Charles Heycock FRS (1858–1931), English chemist and soldier
- Llewellyn Heycock, Baron Heycock CBE (1905–1990), Welsh politician

== See also ==
- Haycock (surname)
- Heyco
