= Haycocks =

Haycocks is an English surname. Notable people with this surname include:

- Jaymie Haycocks (born 1983), English squash player
- Paddy Haycocks (born 1950), British broadcaster

== See also ==
- Haycock (surname)
