= Cardwell Divisional Board Hall =

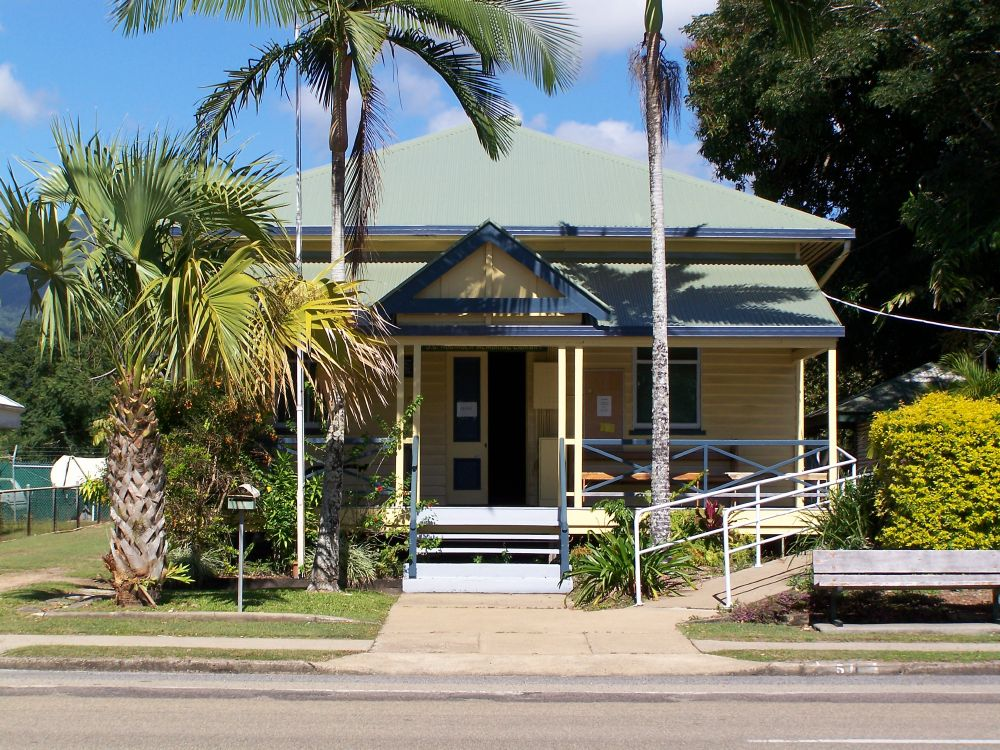
- Cardwell Divisional Board Hall, 2008

- Location within Queensland Location within Australia
- 18.2679°S 146.0297°E
- Location: 51 Victoria Street, Cardwell, Cassowary Coast Region, Queensland, Australia

History
- Built: 1892

Site notes
- Architectural style: Classicism

Queensland Heritage Register
- Official name: Cardwell Divisional Board Hall (former) and Honour Board, JC Hubinger Memorial Museum, JC Hubinger Museum, JC Hubinger Memorial Hall
- Type: state heritage (built)
- Designated: 21 March 2013
- Reference no.: 601768
- Significant period: 1892–1929
- Significant components: stage/sound shell

Cardwell Divisional Board Hall is a heritage-listed former town hall at 51 Victoria Street, Cardwell, Cassowary Coast Region, Queensland, Australia. It is also known as the Cardwell Shire Chambers, Cardwell Shire Hall, JC Hubinger Memorial Museum, JC Hubinger Museum, and JC Hubinger Memorial Hall. The hall and its World War I honour roll were added to the Queensland Heritage Register on 21 March 2013.

== History ==
The Cardwell Divisional Board Hall was originally constructed in 1892 and is located within an early government precinct on Victoria Street, Cardwell. Very few purpose-built divisional board halls or offices survive in Queensland. The timber building became the Cardwell Shire Hall in 1903, and a marble honour board was added in 1922. After the Cardwell Shire Council's administrative functions moved to Tully in 1929 the hall was used by the Queensland Country Women's Association (QCWA) and later the Returned Sailors' Soldiers' and Airmen's Imperial League of Australia (RSSAILA) before becoming a library from 1989–2008. It is now part of the Cardwell Bush Telegraph Heritage Centre and is called the JC Hubinger Museum.

European settlement of the Cardwell district began in January 1864 when a small party landed at Rockingham Bay. The expedition was a private initiative led by George Elphinstone Dalrymple and backed by the Queensland Government. Dalrymple hoped to establish the first Queensland port north of Bowen, which he had helped establish in 1861, and a viable route between the coast and his pastoral run Valley of Lagoons, which was taken up in 1863. Between February and April 1864 Dalrymple journeyed to Valley of Lagoons and returned to the coast, establishing a dray road later called the Dalrymple Gap Track. Initially known as Port Hinchinbrook, the new town was declared a port of entry in May 1864, but Governor Bowen later changed the name to Cardwell, in honour of Edward Cardwell, the then British Secretary of State for the Colonies.

Section 42 of the new town, between Victoria, Balliol, Bowen and Clitheroe Streets, was set aside for government purposes, and included the school, a police reserve, the Post and Telegraph Office, and later the Divisional Board Hall. The district was promoted by both Governor Bowen and Dalrymple, and initially it began to prosper. Money was provided for upgrading the Dalrymple Gap Track in 1864–65 and in the early 1870s a large jetty and a courthouse were built at Cardwell. However, Cardwell's potential as a sheltered, deep water port was never realised. The presence of the Cardwell Range behind the town hindered access to the interior and offshore shallows hampered larger ships. Cardwell was soon overshadowed by Townsville, which was declared a port of entry in 1865. From 1869 the goldfields of the counties of Gilbert and Etheridge provided a stimulus for several years, as Cardwell became the terminus for the gold escort, but there was little shipping trade. By 1876 Cardwell's population was still only 150.

Despite the lack of development, the government established a number of services in Cardwell, thereby becoming the main industry in the town and guaranteeing its continued existence. By the mid 1870s a pilot's quarters, police barracks and lock-up, a Lands Office, combined Court/Customs House, Telegraph Office (now the Cardwell Bush Telegraph), sub-collector's (of customs) residence and provisional school existed at Cardwell.

The town also became the centre of local government for the district when the Cardwell Divisional Board was created in 1884, breaking away from the Hinchinbrook Divisional Board. Local government in Queensland evolved in several phases. The first phase, 1859–79, was a system of permissive municipal incorporation, where local residents could petition for the establishment of a local authority, under the Municipalities Act 1858, (NSW), and later the Queensland Municipal Institutions Act 1864 and Provincial Councils Act 1864. By 1878, 18 towns and cities had been incorporated in Queensland. Regional areas were serviced only in part by a system of Road Boards, which had been established under the Department of Works. Consequently, the central government was regularly required to legislate on local community issues. The subsequent pressure on members of the Queensland Legislative Assembly to secure resources for their electorate led to widespread accusations of corruption.

The second phase of local government was shaped by the Local Government Act 1878, and the Divisional Boards Act 1879, following expansion of closer settlement in Queensland. Instead of citizens petitioning for local government, the colonial government imposed local government on citizens. The 1878 Act established towns, cities and shires (the latter being closely settled areas close to towns or cities); while the 1879 Act created divisional boards to cover rural Queensland outside the towns, cities and shires. Each division was governed by a board of no less than 3 and no more than 9 members. Pugh's Almanac for 1880 listed a total 62 divisional boards (elected and appointed up to 23 February 1880), while 77 boards were listed the following year. The initial divisions often proved ineffective (largely due to size) and were progressively revised so that by 1902 there were 116 divisional boards throughout Queensland. Divisional boards either built halls or offices, or used pre-existing premises. Of the divisional boards listed in 1902, only 38 were reported as meeting at a divisional hall.

The third phase saw the abolition of divisional boards and the older form of shire by the Local Authorities Act 1902, which created a simpler system of towns, cities and shires. The divisional boards became shire councils on 31 March 1903.

When the Cardwell Divisional Board was proclaimed it covered an area of 7000 square miles (18,130 square kilometres), from Mourilyan Harbour to Haycock Island and inland in a south-west direction towards Charters Towers. Although the authority contained 500 rateable properties and at least 212 ratepayers, only 1 nomination was received for the 8 available elected positions (6 members and 2 auditors). The positions were eventually filled by Governor appointment (upon the recommendation of the police magistrate) but the sheer size of the division, seasonal difficulties and the business demands of the board members meant that meetings were difficult to organise and attendance rates were often poor. In 1891 the population of Cardwell was only 139.

The new Cardwell Divisional Board met in the 2-storey 1870s courthouse in Cardwell, the first Thursday of every other month, until the building was badly damaged in a March 1890 cyclone. The replacement courthouse was much smaller, necessitating the construction of a new public building for divisional board meetings and other community functions. This was erected on the allotment to the north-west of the courthouse in 1892–93, as a dual-propose facility. The amount spent on the new hall, as reported in the Cardwell Divisional Board's accounts covering 1 January 1892 to 30 June 1893, was £320/3/10. Inside the hall, a stage and associated facilities were provided at the south-west end, and a work and storage room existed as a rear annex until the late 1980s.

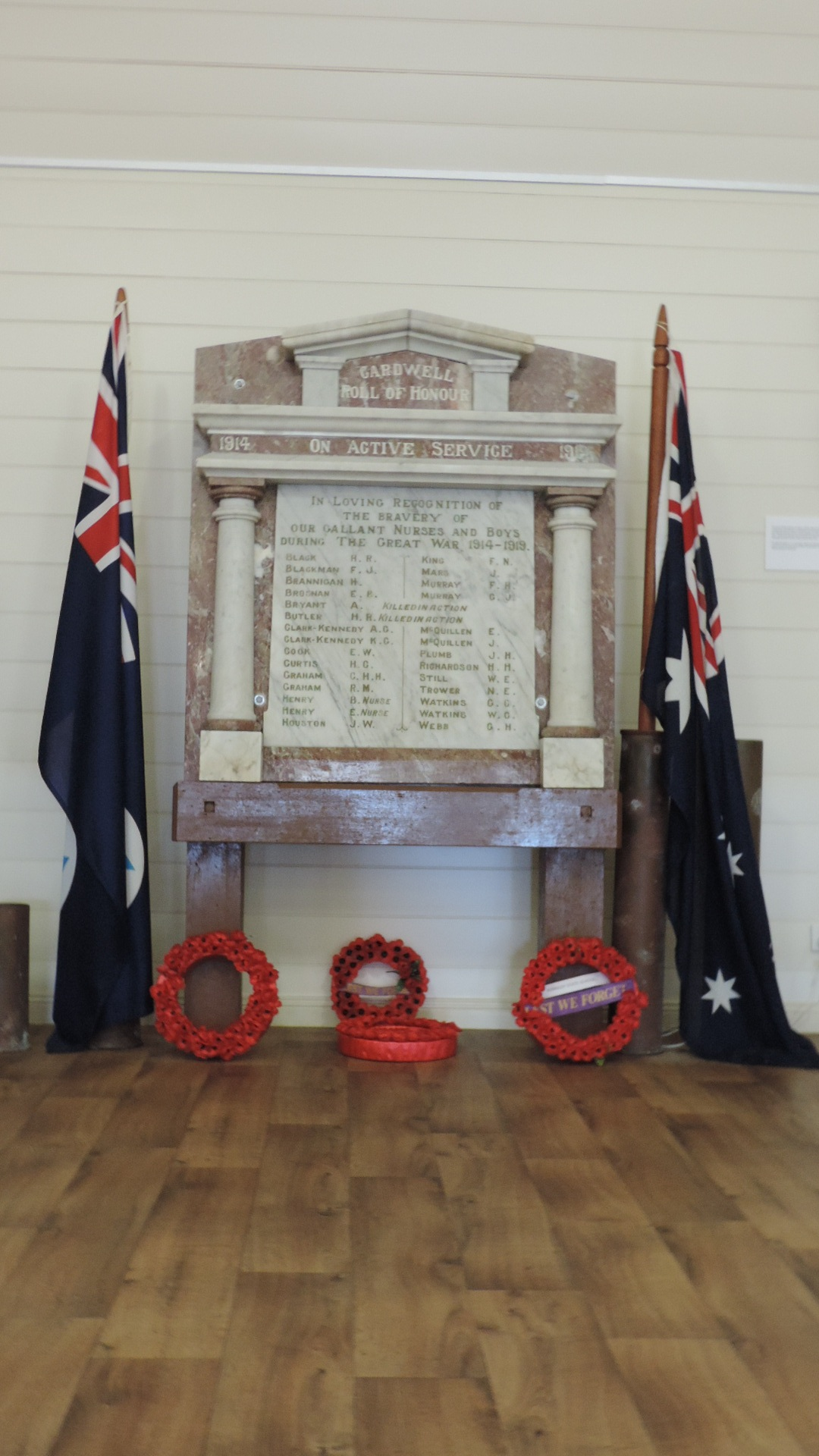
Cardwell Roll of Honour, 2016

In 1903 the Cardwell Divisional Board became the Cardwell Shire Council and the hall continued in use as the shire chambers. In April 1922 the Honor [sic] Board Committee wrote to the Shire Council for permission to have the honour roll erected, either in the hall or on the verandah. Councillor Blackman moved that "permission be granted to place the slab on the wall at the back of the stage and alongside the machine gun". The roll of honour, listing those men and women of the district who had served, and 2 men who had been killed, in World War I, was carved into a heavy marble honour board by Melrose and Fenwick of Townsville. A special structure was required to transport the honour board and the Cardwell Shire Council agreed to pay for the installation. The foundations of the supporting timber frame went into the ground under the stage and the "particularly fine Roll of Honor [sic]" was officially unveiled by Premier Ted Theodore in May 1922. Another Cardwell World War I memorial, a column by Melrose and Fenwick, was also built in the early 1920s and stands near the jetty.

Despite Cardwell's early promise, its time as the administrative heart of the Cardwell Shire was almost over. During the 1920s Cardwell was economically eclipsed by the sugar-mill town of Tully, surveyed in 1924. The suggestion "would it not be fitting to name the streets of the Tully town after those who made the supreme sacrifice and those who were prepared to sacrifice their lives for their country?" was published in The Cairns Post in January 1927, and Tully's streets were named after those listed on the roll of honour in the Cardwell hall. In 1929 the administration of Cardwell Shire was transferred to Tully, where a new shire hall was soon constructed. The Cardwell Shire later became part of the Cassowary Coast Region, headquartered in Innisfail, in 2008. However, the honour board remained in the Cardwell hall, and in 1931 Tully had to be content with a photograph of the honour board being shown at its ANZAC Day service.

After the Cardwell Shire Council vacated the hall, it was leased to the Queensland branch of the County Women's Association, effective from 12 July 1929. The QCWA applied to the Railway Department for electric light to be extended to the hall, but this does not seem to have occurred before 1936. In 1931 the QCWA also moved the timber front doors of the hall to the rear of the building. Despite the QCWA lease, the hall was still used for ceremonies by the Cardwell sub-branch of the RSSILA before being gifted by the Cardwell Shire to the sub-branch as the "Diggers Memorial Hall" at midnight, New Year's Eve 1945–1946.

Other community uses of the former divisional hall over the years have included entertaining visiting politicians, electioneering, auctions of properties forfeited for non-payment of rates, and dances. During World War II, a section of the Tully Volunteer Defence Corps (VDC) was billeted in the hall during a recruiting visit in April 1942. Musical and theatrical productions were also held at the hall, some of which left graffiti of their visits on the walls of staging rooms - the oldest is by the Musical Carlsons, who played there on 22 June 1925.

By the 1980s the condition of the well-used hall had deteriorated and concerns were raised about its future. Community sentiment strongly supported its retention, even though a new community centre was proposed for Cardwell. Following public representations it was decided to restore the hall as a 1988 Bicentennial Project, jointly funded by the Cardwell Shire Council, the Queensland Government and the Australian Bicentennial Authority. The works included restumping, re-flooring and demolition of the original rear annex due to extensive dry-rot. Proposals to move the honour board at this time were opposed by the community.

The hall was officially reopened in January 1989 as the JC Hubinger Memorial Library. It was named in honour of Johann Christian Hubinger, who was Chairman of the Cardwell Divisional Board and the Cardwell Shire Council 15 times. In the early 1890s Hubinger, a German migrant to Queensland, was listed in Pugh's Almanac as a butcher, baker, storekeeper and insurance agent for South British in Cardwell.

By 1989 the form of the hall appeared essentially the same as it had in 1911; except that the cross bracing pattern in the balustrading had changed; the verandah posts had lost their decorative capitals; handrails had been added to the stairs; the timber framework of the small gable in the front verandah had been sheeted over and the finial removed; a concrete ramp had been added to access the side of the front verandah and the picket fence had been removed. Four of the 6 sash windows on each side of the hall were also replaced with casement windows at some stage.

The JC Hubinger Memorial Library also functioned as a museum, and the local Returned and Services League used the stage area for a display of memorabilia and photographs. Cardwell's former courthouse and 1907 lock-up were relocated to the rear of the former divisional hall by 2003. The library moved to a new location in Balliol Street in 2008, but the hall continued to function as a museum within the Cardwell Bush Telegraph Heritage Centre, which includes the former courthouse, lock-up and Post and Telegraph Office. The hall was also used for the annual ANZAC Day dawn service until it was heavily damaged by Cyclone Yasi in February 2011.

Due to public support for retaining the hall, and for keeping the honour board there, it was extensively rebuilt in its original form, retaining original fabric in the stage area. The honour board was remounted on its original supporting frame and the hall was officially reopened on 20 October 2012. The only original features to survive the cyclone damage were the stage, dressing rooms, honour roll, and the Cardwell Shire Council table.

Few other divisional board halls survive in Queensland, as most were simple timber buildings that were demolished or sold as local government facilities were upgraded. Other known surviving divisional board halls or offices are:

- Toombul Divisional Board Hall, built 1891, later the Toombul Shire Hall at Nundah, City of Brisbane
- Pine Divisional Board Hall, built 1889, later the Pine Rivers Shire Hall) at Strathpine, City of Moreton Bay
- Rawbelle Divisional Board Hall at Gayndah, North Burnett Region
- Caboolture Divisional Board Hall, built 1883, later moved to the Caboolture Historical Village, Caboolture, City of Moreton Bay

== Description ==
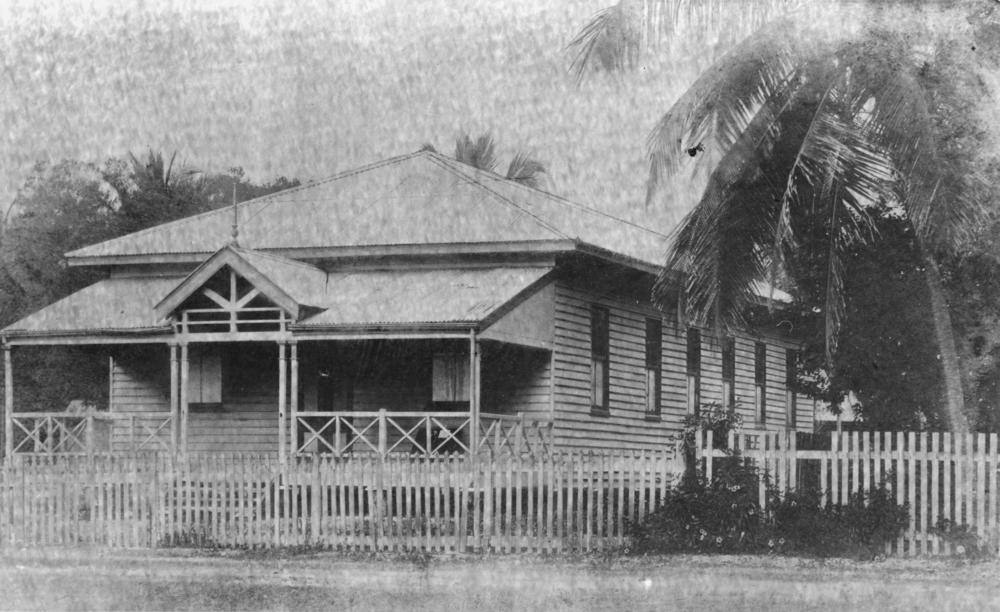
Cardwell Shire Council Chambers, 1911

The former Cardwell Divisional Board Hall is located at the southern end of the Cardwell business district on the main street, Victoria Street, adjacent to the former Telegraph Office (now Cardwell Bush Telegraph). Facing north-east toward, and across the road from, the beach and the Coral Sea, the hall is centrally positioned on its allotment, set back from all boundaries.

The hall is a modest, symmetrical, single storey timber building, low- set on timber stumps, clad in weatherboards, with a hipped roof of corrugated metal sheeting and eaves lined with timber battens. Its front verandah has a skillion roof with central gable supported on pairs of posts demarcating the entrance, and a cross-braced balustrade. Openings are symmetrically positioned around the building with: double-hung sash windows on the front elevation either side of a pair of panelled entrance doors; 6 windows to each side elevation - 4 pairs of casement windows between double-hung sash windows at each end; and 2 pairs of panelled doors at the rear. The rainwater disposal system comprises slotted quad gutter and PVC downpipes.

The hall interior is lined with beaded tongue-and-groove boards and houses a raised timber stage at the rear, flanked by 2 small rooms, and a room in the north-east corner near the entrance formed by partial height partitions. At the entrance, a portion of the ceiling is flat with the remaining coved ceiling featuring timber fretwork roses and steel tie-rods. Varnished timber stairs with matching railings lead from the hall to the stage where a large rouge and white marble memorial honour board listing the names of 26 men and 2 nurses from Cardwell who served in World War I is fixed to the rear wall. The honour board features simplified classical architectural elements (columns, entablature, and pediment) and is prominently positioned within the hall, supported on a substantial timber frame. Loose furniture in the hall includes the original table used by the Cardwell Divisional Board. This table, the honour board and the original stage area of the hall are of particular heritage significance, as is the scale and form of the hall itself.

Within the grounds, 2 large trees are located along the boundary with the former telegraph office. A concrete access ramp located on the north-west side of the verandah provides access to both the street and to a detached toilet facility. These structures are not of cultural heritage significance. Behind the hall are two detached timber structures (a former courthouse and a former lock-up) that do not form part of this heritage listing but are of local heritage significance.

== Heritage listing ==
The former Cardwell Divisional Board Hall and its Honour Board were listed on the Queensland Heritage Register on 21 March 2013 having satisfied the following criteria.

The place is important in demonstrating the evolution or pattern of Queensland's history.

The former Cardwell Divisional Board Hall, originally constructed in 1892, is important in demonstrating the origins and development of local government in Queensland. Very few purpose-built divisional board halls survive in Queensland, and the hall's simple form and small scale are indicative of the role and limited resources of the early divisional boards. The hall's location is also important surviving evidence of the administrative role of Cardwell as the main town in the Cardwell Shire prior to the 1920s.

The World War I (WWI) memorial honour board is a record of Queensland's involvement in a major world event. WWI memorials, including honour boards, are a tribute to those who served, and those who died, from a particular community. Often the focus of ANZAC Day ceremonies, they are an important element of Queensland's towns and cities and are also important in demonstrating a common pattern of commemoration across Queensland and Australia.

The place is important in demonstrating the principal characteristics of a particular class of cultural places.

The Cardwell WWI honour board is an example of its type. It is located within the hall and is made of marble. It employs classical architectural elements to display a list of 26 men and 2 nurses who served from the local community. The listing of nurses on an honour board is rare in Queensland.

The place is important because of its aesthetic significance.

The Cardwell WWI honour board is important for its aesthetic significance as a designed, composed tablet, finely crafted using contrasting rouge and white marble with gilded and leaded lettering. Prominently displayed at the stage end of the hall, it provides a focus for the remembrance of those involved in the world event.

The place has a strong or special association with a particular community or cultural group for social, cultural or spiritual reasons.

The former Cardwell Divisional Board Hall has a long and special connection with the people of the Cardwell District. Its numerous public functions as an administrative centre, theatre, Queensland Country Women's Association Hall, ANZAC Day ceremonial site, reception venue, library and museum have generated strong community associations. Community attachment to the hall ensured its survival in the late 1980s when it was threatened with demolition, and also ensured that it was rebuilt after Cyclone Yasi in 2011. Local attachment to the hall's honour board reflects the wider reverence felt for such memorials across Australia. As a focus for ANZAC Day ceremonies, it is highly valued by the community for its spiritual, symbolic, cultural and social associations.[1]
