= Henry Wilmot =

Henry Wilmot may refer to:

- Henry Wilmot, 1st Earl of Rochester (1612–1658)
- Sir Henry Wilmot, 4th Baronet (1801–1872)
- Sir Henry Wilmot, 5th Baronet (1831–1901), English recipient of the Victoria Cross
- Sir Henry Wilmot, 9th Baronet (born 1967)
- Henry Wilmot (politician) (1826–1888), Ontario MPP
