= Hugh Smith (politician) =

Canadian politician

Ontario MPP
- In office 1888–1894
- Preceded by: Henry Wilmot
- Succeeded by: Joseph Longford Haycock
- Constituency: Frontenac

Personal details
- Born: September 3, 1839 Portland Township, Frontenac County, Upper Canada
- Party: Conservative
- Occupation: Farmer

Hugh Smith (born 3 September 1839) was an Ontario farmer and political figure. He represented Frontenac in the Legislative Assembly of Ontario as a Conservative member from 1888 to 1894.

He was born in Portland Township, Frontenac County, Upper Canada in 1839, the son of William Smith, an Irish immigrant, and educated in Kingston. Smith served on the township council and was county warden from 1882 to 1888. He was elected to the provincial assembly in an 1888 by-election held after the death of Henry Wilmot.
