= Anthony McGuin Rankin =

Canadian politician

Anthony Rankin
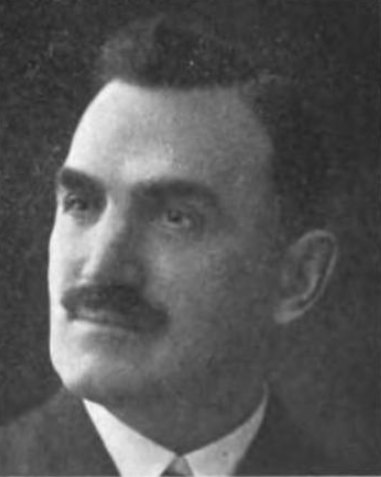

Ontario MPP
- In office 1911–1926
- Preceded by: John S. Gallagher
- Succeeded by: Riding abolished
- Constituency: Frontenac

Personal details
- Born: October 26, 1873 Collins Bay, Ontario
- Died: June 21, 1927 (aged 53) Lennox and Addington, Ontario
- Party: Progressive Conservative
- Spouse: Jean Euris (m. 1901)
- Occupation: Farmer

Anthony McGuin Rankin (October 26, 1873 – June 21, 1927) was a farmer, miller, and political figure in Ontario, Canada. He represented Frontenac in the Legislative Assembly of Ontario from 1911 to 1926 as a Conservative member.

He was born in Collins Bay, the son of David J. Rankin and Eliza J. Purdy, and was educated in Kingston. In 1901, Rankin married Jean Euris. He was reeve of Kingston township for four years. He died in 1927.
