= Delino Dexter Calvin =

Canadian politician (1798–1884)

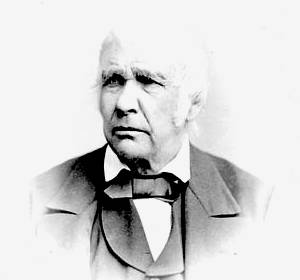
- Calvin, 1873

Ontario MPP
- In office 1877–1883
- Preceded by: Peter Graham (Note: Graham died in office, 1877. Calvin replaced him in a by-election.)
- Succeeded by: Henry Wilmot
- Constituency: Frontenac
- In office 1868–1875
- Preceded by: Henry Smith (Note: Smith died in office, 1868. Calvin replaced him in a by-election.)
- Succeeded by: Peter Graham
- Constituency: Frontenac

Personal details
- Born: Delino Dexter Calvin; 15 May 1798 Clarendon, Vermont
- Died: 18 May 1884 (aged 86) Garden Island, Ontario
- Spouse(s): Harriet Webb, Marion Maria Breck, Catherine Wilkinson
- Children: 14
- Occupation: Businessman
- Known for: Timber, tug boats, Garden Island

Delino Dexter Calvin (May 15, 1798 – 18 May 1884) was a naturalized Canadian citizen, former resident of New England, successful Ontario businessman and political figure. He represented Frontenac in the Legislative Assembly of Ontario as a Conservative member from 1868 to 1875 and from 1877 to 1883.

The township of Calvin in Nipissing District, Ontario, was named after him.

== Early days ==
Calvin was born in Clarendon, Vermont, United States, in 1798, the fourth of five children to Sandford Jenks Calvin and Abigail Chipman. Sandford Calvin, an unsuccessful attorney, died when Delino was only eight years old. Delino later moved to northern New York State in 1818, specifically near La Fargeville, where he farmed and became involved in the lumber trade. This would represent the beginnings of his successful business career in the timber trades. He later moved to Clayton, New York to concentrate on lumber operations.

== Business life ==
In 1836, he became involved in the Kingston Stave Forwarding Company with John Counter and an American, Hiram Cook, (later, in 1838 it became, Calvin and Cook) and, in 1844, moved to Garden Island in Canada West because the location was the most ideal to collect and raft timber that was to be forwarded down the St. Lawrence River. The Garden Island location was ideal because Calvin could operate within the British (Commonwealth) system. Further, the location, at the foot of the Great Lakes, provided a sheltered bay for building rafts of timber and for access to retrieve the bound rafts.

The company owned between twelve and fifteen ships which transported timber, mostly oak and pine, from the Great Lakes to Garden Island, where the logs were built into rafts that were floated down the Saint Lawrence to Quebec City for transportation to Britain to company offices in Liverpool and Glasgow. The company also operated a number of business ventures that enabled Calvin to be significantly diversified. They acted as general merchants, shipbuilders and manufacturers, transported other goods and operated a tugboat service. Calvin's business ventures were incredibly successful amassing a fortune of assets of $460,000 in 1871. Calvin also served as a director of the Kingston and Pembroke Railway.

By 1862, he became sole owner of Garden Island and looked after the small community of approximately 750 people who mainly consisted of company workers, serving as reeve when it was incorporated as a village in 1866. With considerable generosity for his employees, his company subsidized a school, an excellent library for the timeframe, post office, and several fraternal societies. Calvin enforced prohibition on the island. He was also reeve of Wolfe Island and became warden for Frontenac County in 1863. In 1873, a recession followed a panic that lead Calvin to cut the wages of his beloved employees, however, in consideration of their well-being, he refused to resort to lay offs of any kind and allowed the more senior employees to purchase shares in the company.

He was elected to the provincial legislature in an 1868 by-election after the death of the sitting member and served until 1875. He was elected again in 1877 after the death of Peter Graham and served until 1883. He died on Garden Island in 1884 and was buried in Clayton next to his mother and his first wife.

=== Tugboat business ===
In 1855, Calvin's company that he co-owned with Ira Breck, known as Calvin and Breck was commissioned by the Province of Canada to maintain and operate a flotilla of tug boats in the St. Lawrence Seaway to tow vessels between the ports of Lachine and Kingston. The contract between the Province and the company was for three years. The contract spelled out that for the season of navigation, Calvin and Breck were required to "furnish, provide, maintain, repair, and keep in repair at least six steamboats of such class and power ..which may be necessary for promptly towing all such vessels and other craft for which such service may be required." In addition the company was required to keep and maintain supplies, in the event of an accident. The contract with the Province was renewed in 1858 and again in 1863.

The firm would later be known only as Calvin & Co who were owners of Garden Island, lumber merchants, forwarders and ship owners.

== Public servant ==
=== Garden and Wolfe Islands ===
Calvin held a number of significant roles in local politics in and around Garden Island. He became reeve of Garden, Wolfe and the surrounding islands in the area in the St. Lawrence. Additionally, he became the first warden of Frontenac County after it separated from Lennox and Addington in 1863. This position he held a total of four times in his career. In 1870, John A. Macdonald appointed him to a canal commission to improve the quality of the canals in the St. Lawrence Seaway. This commission position he shared with Hugh Allan and Casimir Stanislaus Gzowski, a famous Canadian engineer and military officer, born in Russia.

=== Member of Provincial Parliament ===
Calvin was preceded as representative of Frontenac by Speaker of the House, Sir Henry Smith. When Smith died, during recess, Calvin was sent to fill the vacant position. Later, he ran against Byron Moffatt Britton and won an easy victory as most of the residents of Garden Island voted for Calvin. His grandson noted that the residents, "the men...wisely voted...Conservative".

Calvin was a member of the Conservative Party from 1868 through 1883. Calvin held a number of roles in the Provincial Parliament. He was a member of the Standing Committee on Private Bills (1879–1883), member of the Committee on Railways (1869–1883), member of the Select Committee Appointed to Inquire into the working of the Tavern and License Act of 1868 etc. (1874), member of the Select Committee to enquire into the usefulness and cost of wooden railways as a mean of furthering the settlement of the country (1869), member of the Standing Committee on Privileges an Elections (1869) and member of the Select Committee to consider Bill 58 (An Act regulating Line Fences and Watercourse) (1868).

His politics were oftentimes a curiosity. For example, he sided with agriculture against lumber when the interests of both were in conflict. This showed a considerable objectivity of his, as his personal financial interests would have required him to side with the lumber industry.

Calvin retired from Parliament in 1874. He again returned to Parliament after the passing of sitting member, Mr. Graham, in 1877.

== Personal life ==
Calvin was married three times. His first marriage was to Harriet Webb in 1831; producing a total of six children. The second marriage to Marion Marie Breck, in 1844, was after the passing of Harriet, in 1843. His second marriage also produced a total of six children. Marion died in 1861. His third and last union was to Catherine Wilkinson of Kingston and together, they had two children. Of his total fourteen children, only six survived to adulthood. He died on 18 May 1884 and is buried alongside his mother and first wife in Clayton, New York.

Calvin was known for being eccentric in Parliament and in his personal life. He was reported by his own grandson to be suspicious of short men, citing their shortness as the only reason for his concern. Further, he had disdain for people who engaged in habits such as nail biting. He noted that poor men tend to acquire a dog and very poor men, acquire two dogs.

=== Citizenship ===
Based on family testimonials, Calvin never considered himself a Canadian; rather an American doing business in Canada, although he had become a naturalized British citizen in 1845 (Canada would not become a sovereign nation until 1867). On one occasion, he was recorded as having told John A. Macdonald, "I can holler for the Queen as loud as you can".

=== Children ===
As reported above, Calvin produced a total of fourteen children. His namesake, Delano Dexter Calvin Jr., born on Garden Island, became a Paris-educated architect operating in Toronto under the firm name of Shepard and Calvin and historian of Queen's University.

His son Hiram Augustus took over the operation of the business on his father's death and later served in the House of Commons. His daughter Minerva Edna married Nelson Gordon Bigelow who served in the Ontario legislative assembly.

== Electoral history ==
Ontario provincial by-election, November 2, 1868: Frontenac Death of Henry Smith
Party	Candidate	Votes	%	±%
Conservative	Delino Dexter Calvin	992	64.12	+1.64
Independent	B.M. Britton	555	35.88	+35.77
Total valid votes		1,547	100.0	−18.49
Conservative hold		Swing		−17.07
Source: History of the Electoral Districts, Legislatures and Ministries of the Province of Ontario

1871 Ontario general election: Frontenac
Party	Candidate	Votes
Conservative	Delino Dexter Calvin	Acclaimed
Source: Elections Ontario

Ontario provincial by-election, February 14, 1877: Frontenac Death of Peter Graham
Party	Candidate	Votes	%	±%
Conservative	Delino Dexter Calvin	747	45.83	−13.78
Liberal	T. Dawson	388	23.80	−16.59
Independent	Mr. Bawden	292	17.91	
Independent	Mr. Murray	203	12.45	
Total valid votes		1,630		
Conservative hold		Swing		+1.40
Source: History of the Electoral Districts, Legislatures and Ministries of the Province of Ontario

1879 Ontario general election: Frontenac
Party	Candidate	Votes	%	±%
Conservative	Delino Dexter Calvin	710	45.57	−0.26
Liberal	T. Dawson	506	32.48	+8.67
Independent	Mr. Vanluven	193	12.39	
Independent	Mr. Strachan	149	9.56	
Total valid votes		1,558	55.86	
Eligible voters		2,789		
Conservative hold		Swing		−4.47
Source: Elections Ontario
