= Haycock Airport =

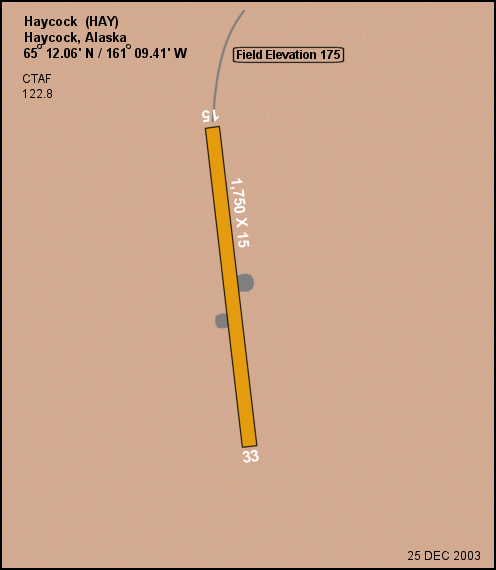
- IATA: none; ICAO: none; FAA LID: HAY

Summary
- Airport type: Public
- Owner: Alaska Department of Natural Resources
- Serves: Haycock, Alaska
- Elevation AMSL: 175 ft (53 m)
- Coordinates: 65°12′04″N 161°09′24″W

Map
- Location of airport in Alaska

Runways
Direction	Length		Surface
Direction	ft	m	Surface
15/33	1,750	533	Gravel/dirt

Statistics (1992)
- Aircraft operations: 300
- Source: Federal Aviation Administration

Haycock Airport (FAA LID: HAY) was a public-use airport located in Haycock, which is in the Nome Census Area of the U.S. state of Alaska. The airport was publicly owned by the Alaska Department of Natural Resources.

== Facilities and aircraft ==
Haycock Airport had one runway designated 15/33 with a gravel and dirt surface measuring 1,750 by 15 feet (533 x 5 m). For the 12-month period ending July 18, 1992, the airport had 300 aircraft operations, an average of 25 per month: 67% air taxi and 33% general aviation.
