= John S. Gallagher =

Canadian politician

John Gallagher

Ontario MPP
- In office 1898–1911
- Preceded by: Joseph Longford Haycock
- Succeeded by: Anthony McGuin Rankin
- Constituency: Frontenac

Personal details
- Born: April 24, 1849 Bastard Township, Canada West
- Died: June 17, 1920 (aged 71) Portland, Ontario
- Party: Progressive Conservative
- Spouse: Miss Mills (m. 1881)
- Occupation: Merchant

John S. Gallagher (April 24, 1849 – June 17, 1920) was an Ontario merchant and political figure. He represented Frontenac in the Legislative Assembly of Ontario from 1898 to 1911 as a Conservative member.

He was born in Bastard Township, Leeds County, Upper Canada in 1849. He served as treasurer for the township and was chairman of the High School Board for Leeds. Gallagher was a hay and grain dealer in Harrowsmith. In 1881, he married a Miss Mills. He was an unsuccessful candidate for the provincial assembly in 1894.

He died in Portland on June 17, 1920.
