= Frontenac (Ontario provincial electoral district) =

Former Ontario provincial electoral district

Ontario electoral district

Defunct provincial electoral district
- Legislature: Legislative Assembly of Ontario
- District created: 1867
- District abolished: 1933
- First contested: 1867
- Last contested: 1929

Frontenac was an electoral district, or riding, in Ontario, Canada. It was created in 1867 at the time of confederation and was abolished in 1933 before the 1934 election.

== Members of Provincial Parliament ==
Frontenac
Assembly	Years	Member	Party
1st	1867–1868	Henry Smith	Conservative
1st	1868–1871	Delino Dexter Calvin	Conservative
2nd	1871–1874	Delino Dexter Calvin	Conservative
3rd	1875–1877	Peter Graham	Conservative
3rd	1877–1879	Delino Dexter Calvin	Conservative
4th	1879–1883	Delino Dexter Calvin	Conservative
5th	1883–1886	Henry Wilmot	Conservative
6th	1886–1888	Henry Wilmot	Conservative
6th	1888–1890	Hugh Smith	Conservative
7th	1890–1894	Hugh Smith	Conservative
8th	1894–1898	Joseph Longford Haycock	Patrons of Industry
9th	1898–1902	John S. Gallagher	Conservative
10th	1902–1904	John S. Gallagher	Conservative
11th	1905–1908	John S. Gallagher	Conservative
12th	1908–1911	John S. Gallagher	Conservative
13th	1911–1914	Anthony McGuin Rankin	Conservative
14th	1914–1919	Anthony McGuin Rankin	Conservative
15th	1919–1923	Anthony McGuin Rankin	Conservative
16th	1923–1926	Anthony McGuin Rankin	Conservative
Sourced from the Ontario Legislative Assembly
Merged into Frontenac-Lennox before the 1934 election

== Election results ==
1923 Ontario general election
Party	Candidate	Votes	%	±%
Conservative	Anthony McGuin Rankin	3,529	57.56	+10.24
United Farmers	George A. Clark	2,602	42.44	+3.10
Total valid votes		6,131	99.92	
Total rejected ballots		5	0.08	–1.92
Turnout		6,136	70.59	–3.76
Eligible voters		8,693		
Conservative hold		Swing		+3.57
Source: Elections Ontario

1919 Ontario general election
Party	Candidate	Votes	%	±%
Conservative	Anthony McGuin Rankin	3,016	47.32	–8.12
United Farmers	William Fawcett	2,507	39.34	–
Independent	William Spankie	850	13.34	–31.21
Total valid votes		6,373	98.00	
Total rejected ballots		130	2.00	+1.59
Turnout		6,503	74.35	–15.15
Eligible voters		8,747		
Conservative hold		Swing		–
Source: Elections Ontario

1914 Ontario general election
Party	Candidate	Votes	%	±%
Conservative	Anthony McGuin Rankin	1,623	55.45	–6.22
Independent	William Spankie	1,304	44.55	–
Total valid votes		2,927	99.59	
Total rejected ballots		12	0.41	–0.08
Turnout		2,939	89.49	+30.20
Eligible voters		3,284		
Conservative hold		Swing		–3.11
Source: Elections Ontario

1911 Ontario general election
Party	Candidate	Votes	%	±%
Conservative	Anthony McGuin Rankin	1,641	61.67	+8.62
Liberal	John P. MacInnes	1,020	38.33	–8.62
Total valid votes		2,661	99.51	
Total rejected ballots		13	0.49	–0.15
Turnout		2,674	59.29	–8.17
Eligible voters		4,510		
Conservative hold		Swing		+8.62
Source: Elections Ontario

1908 Ontario general election
Party	Candidate	Votes	%	±%
Conservative	John S. Gallagher	1,576	53.05	–2.41
Liberal	William Howard Reynolds	1,395	46.95	+2.41
Total valid votes		2,971	99.36	
Total rejected ballots		19	0.64	+0.09
Turnout		2,990	67.46	+5.18
Eligible voters		4,432		
Conservative hold		Swing		–2.41
Source: Elections Ontario

1905 Ontario general election
Party	Candidate	Votes	%	±%
Conservative	John S. Gallagher	1,616	55.46	+4.64
Liberal	William Howard Reynolds	1,298	44.54	–4.64
Total valid votes		2,914	99.45	
Total rejected ballots		16	0.55	–1.06
Turnout		2,930	62.29	–11.48
Eligible voters		4,704		
Conservative hold		Swing		+4.64
Source: Elections Ontario

1902 Ontario general election
Party	Candidate	Votes	%	±%
Conservative	John S. Gallagher	1,774	50.82	–2.92
Liberal	Wellington J. Shibley	1,717	49.18	–
Total valid votes		3,491	98.39	
Total rejected ballots		57	1.61	+1.33
Turnout		3,548	73.76	–1.68
Eligible voters		4,810		
Conservative hold		Swing		–1.46
Source: Elections Ontario

1898 Ontario general election
Party	Candidate	Votes	%	±%
Conservative	John S. Gallagher	1,936	53.73	+5.99
Independent	Joseph Longford Haycock	1,667	46.27	–5.99
Total valid votes		3,603	99.72	
Total rejected ballots		10	0.28	+0.00
Turnout		3,613	75.44	+13.51
Eligible voters		4,789		
Conservative gain from Liberal-Patrons of Industry		Swing		+5.99
Source: Elections Ontario

1894 Ontario general election
Party	Candidate	Votes	%	±%
Liberal-Patrons of Industry	Joseph Longford Haycock	1,517	52.26	–
Conservative	John S. Gallagher	1,386	47.74	–4.28
Total valid votes		2,903	99.73	
Total rejected ballots		8	0.27	+0.27
Turnout		2,911	61.94	–3.73
Eligible voters		4,700		
Liberal-Patrons of Industry gain from Conservative		Swing		–
Source: Elections Ontario

1890 Ontario general election
Party	Candidate	Votes	%	±%
Conservative	Hugh Smith	1,258	52.03	+0.72
Liberal	Henry T. Shibley	1,160	47.97	–0.72
Total valid votes		2,418	100.00	
Total rejected ballots		–		
Turnout		2,418	65.67	–
Eligible voters		3,682		
Conservative hold		Swing		+0.72
Source: Elections Ontario

Ontario provincial by-election, October 11, 1888 Death of Henry Wilmot
Party	Candidate	Votes	%	±%
Conservative	Hugh Smith	885	51.30	–7.23
Liberal	T.C. Stark	840	48.70	+7.23
Total valid votes		1,725	100.00	
Total rejected ballots		–		
Turnout		1,725	–	–
Eligible voters				
Conservative hold		Swing		–7.23
Source: Elections Ontario

1886 Ontario general election
Party	Candidate	Votes	%	±%
Conservative	Henry Wilmot	1,218	58.53	+4.27
Liberal	J. McGrath	863	41.47	–4.27
Total valid votes		2,081	100.00	
Total rejected ballots		–		
Turnout		2,081	58.79	–17.02
Eligible voters		3,540		
Conservative hold		Swing		+4.27
Source: Elections Ontario

1883 Ontario general election
Party	Candidate	Votes	%	±%
Conservative	Henry Wilmot	1,103	54.25	+8.68
Liberal	Robert Hewton Fair	930	45.75	+13.27
Total valid votes		2,033	99.36	
Total rejected ballots		13	0.64	+0.64
Turnout		2,046	75.81	+19.94
Eligible voters		2,699		
Conservative hold		Swing		–2.29
Source: Elections Ontario

1879 Ontario general election
Party	Candidate	Votes	%	±%
Conservative	Delino Dexter Calvin	710	45.57	−0.26
Liberal	T. Dawson	506	32.48	+8.67
Independent	Mr. Vanluven	193	12.39	
Independent	Mr. Strachan	149	9.56	
Total valid votes		1,558	55.86	
Eligible voters		2,789		
Conservative hold		Swing		−4.47
Source: Elections Ontario

Ontario provincial by-election, February 14, 1877 Death of Peter Graham
Party	Candidate	Votes	%	±%
Conservative	Delino Dexter Calvin	747	45.83	−13.78
Liberal	T. Dawson	388	23.80	−16.59
Independent	Mr. Bawden	292	17.91	
Independent	Mr. Murray	203	12.45	
Total valid votes		1,630		
Conservative hold		Swing		+1.40
Source: History of the Electoral Districts, Legislatures and Ministries of the Province of Ontario

1875 Ontario general election
Party	Candidate	Votes	%
Conservative	Peter Graham	884	59.61
Liberal	T. Dawson	599	40.39
Turnout		1,483	55.92
Eligible voters		2,652	
Conservative hold			
Source: Elections Ontario

1871 Ontario general election
Party	Candidate	Votes
Conservative	Delino Dexter Calvin	Acclaimed
Source: Elections Ontario

Ontario provincial by-election, November 2, 1868 Death of Henry Smith
Party	Candidate	Votes	%	±%
Conservative	Delino Dexter Calvin	992	64.12	+1.64
Independent	B.M. Britton	555	35.88	+35.77
Total valid votes		1,547	100.0	−18.49
Conservative hold		Swing		−17.07
Source: History of the Electoral Districts, Legislatures and Ministries of the Province of Ontario

1867 Ontario general election
Party	Candidate	Votes	%
Conservative	Henry Smith	1,186	62.49
Liberal	John Fraser	710	37.41
Independent	B.M. Britton	2	0.11
Total valid votes		1,898	73.91
Eligible voters		2,568	
Conservative pickup new district.			
Source: Elections Ontario
