= Cardwell Bush Telegraph =

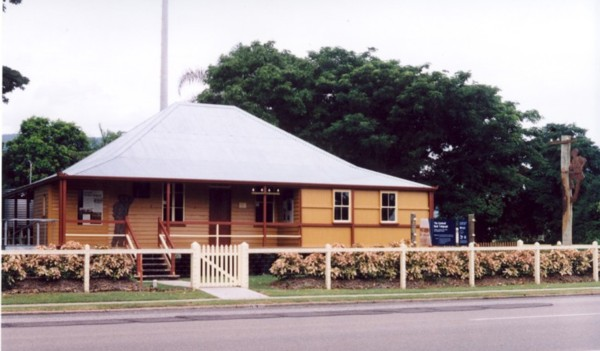
- Cardwell Bush Telegraph, 2003

- Location within Queensland
- 18.2676°S 146.0296°E
- Location: 53 Victoria Street, Cardwell, Cassowary Coast Region, Queensland, Australia

History
- Design period: 1870s–1890s (late 19th century)
- Built: 1870

Site notes
- Architect: Colonial Architect's Office

Queensland Heritage Register
- Official name: Cardwell Post Office – Residence (former), Post Office, Post and Telegraph Office, Telegraph Office
- Type: state heritage (built)
- Designated: 21 October 1992
- Reference no.: 600392
- Significant period: 1870s (fabric); 1870s–1980s (historical, social)
- Significant components: fence/wall – perimeter, kitchen/kitchen house, toilet block/earth closet/water closet, trees/plantings, post & telegraph office, residential accommodation – post master's house/quarters, counter, tank stand
- Builders: George McCallum

Cardwell Bush Telegraph is a heritage-listed former post office and now heritage centre at 53 Victoria Street, Cardwell, Cassowary Coast Region, Queensland, Australia. The Telegraph and Post Office at Cardwell was designed by Colonial Architect's Office and built in 1870 by George McCallum, making it one of the oldest buildings in North Queensland.

The building operated as a post office until 1982. It was refurbished, conserved, branded "Cardwell Bush Telegraph", and re-opened as a heritage centre on 28 February 2003. The heritage precinct also includes the former court house and jail, an area designated as a government reserve for much of the township's history. The precinct welcomes visitors and showcases the history of Cardwell and its significance to the surrounding area. It was listed on the Register of the National Estate of the Australian Heritage Commission. It was added to the Queensland Heritage Register on 21 October 1992.

It is located on the corner of the Bruce Highway and Balliol Street at the southern end of the town and is immediately adjacent to the also heritage-listed Cardwell Divisional Board Hall.

== History ==
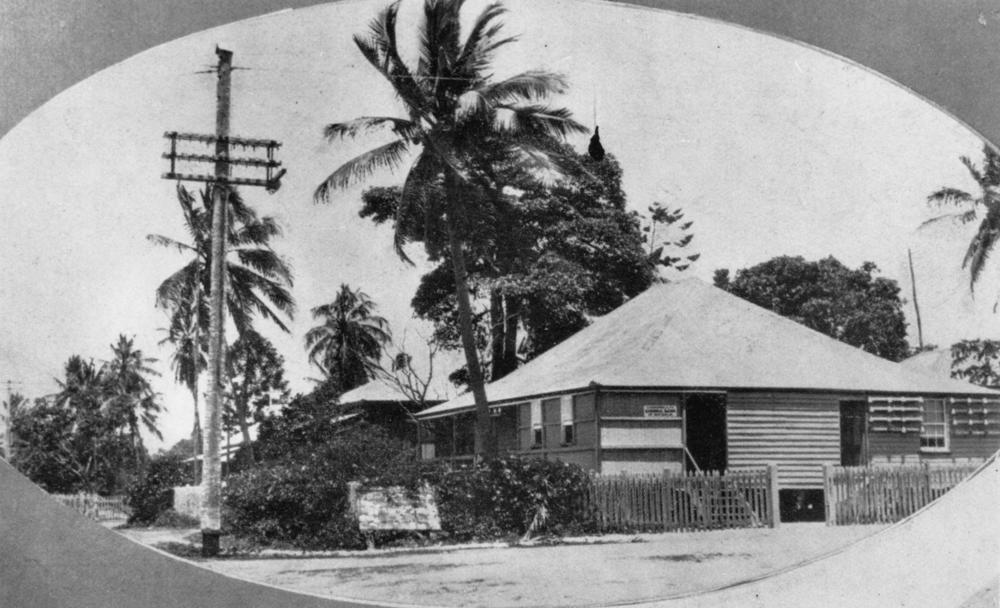
Cardwell Post Office in 1930

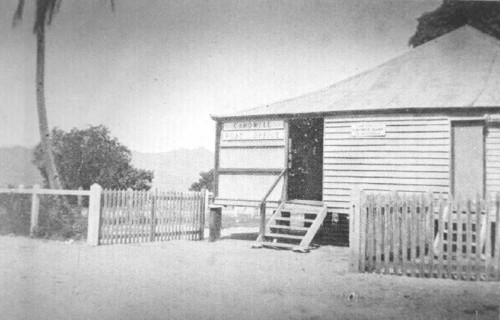
Cardwell Post Office c.1930

This single storeyed timber building was erected in 1870 as the Telegraph Office in Cardwell. Designed by the Colonial Works office, the Superintendent of Roads and Buildings at the time was Charles Tiffin. The contract for the building was let to George McCallum of Brisbane. Records indicate that the building was prefabricated in Brisbane and shipped to Cardwell, where it was erected on the present site. It is considered to be one of the earliest examples of prefabricated post office buildings, reflecting the need to erect substantial Government buildings in remote settlements where structures were otherwise relatively unsophisticated.

Cardwell was settled in 1864, the first port settlement on the Queensland coast north of Port Denison (Bowen). The first party of non-indigenous people to settle at Rockingham Bay arrived in January 1864. They were 20 in number and they came from Bowen on the small schooner Policeman with the three ton cutter Heather Bell in tow.

The Cardwell town reserve was proclaimed in July 1864 to serve the grazing properties inland, particularly the Valley of Lagoons district which was expected to become a rich pastoral district. Indeed, the Valley of Lagoons Station established in 1862 was part-owned by the then Queensland Premier Robert Herbert.

Cardwell was settled with a great deal of confidence and Government support for its future role in the development of North Queensland, as it had a deep, sheltered harbour and was expected to develop into a significant regional town. A substantial government infrastructure was established in Cardwell, including a pilot's quarters, police barracks and lockup, court and customs house, post magistrate's residence, sub-collector's residence, lands office, and telegraph station, which reflected this enthusiasm. A Post Office was opened in Cardwell in 1864, the first Post Master also officiating as the District Registrar, Sub Collector of Customs, Clerk of Petty Sessions and Harbour Master.

The telegraph office and the police station were among a group of government buildings erected on Section 42 of the town reserve, also referred to as the Government reserve.

The erection of a telegraph office in Cardwell coincided with the expansion of the telegraph service in Queensland. The extension of a telegraph line from Bowen to the Gulf of Carpentaria was considered desirable for two main reasons; to serve the settlers in the area, and there was the possibility of joining the proposed overseas cable from Java. The Queensland Government hoped the connecting cable linking Australian to Asia and then to Europe would enter Australia through the Gulf of Carpentaria. The telegraph line reached Cardwell in December 1869. Tenders were called for the erection of a telegraph office in Cardwell in October 1869. The telegraph line reached the town on 29 December 1869 and five days later the telegraph office opened in 1870. A combined post and telegraph office was established soon after, and the majority of Post Masters from 1870–1893 were employees of the Electric Telegraph Department. The configuration of the building with four core rooms and detached kitchen was the most common form of timber telegraph/post office buildings in the nineteenth century. The Cardwell office appears to have been the first of approximately thirty buildings erected in this form during the period 1869–1885.

Tenders had been called in September 1869 for the erection of telegraph lines from Cardwell to Gilberton and then to the Gulf of Carpentaria, and the two sections were completed in 1871 and 1872 respectively. However, in 1872, the overseas cable was connected to the Australian Overland Telegraph line at Darwin and not via the Gulf of Carpentaria. So the main purpose for which the Cardwell Telegraph Office and telegraph lines were built did not in fact materialise. Nonetheless the telegraph line from Cardwell successfully served the settlers in the Gulf region.

The Hinchinbrook Division was created on 11 November 1879 as one of 74 divisions around Queensland to administer local government under the Divisional Boards Act 1879. On 18 January 1884, part of the Hinchinbrook Division was separated to create the new Cardwell Division.

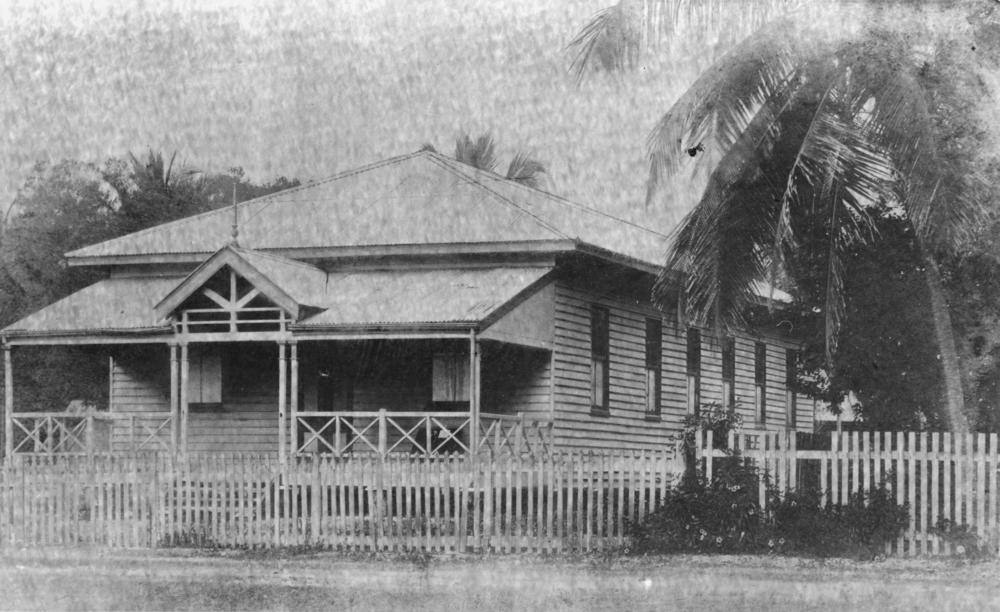
Cardwell Divisional Board Hall (later Cardwell Shire Council Chambers), Cardwell, 1911

In 1892, the Cardwell Divisional Board built the Cardwell Divisional Board Hall (also now heritage-listed) at 51 Victoria Street, next door to the post and telegraph office. At that time, Cardwell was regarded as the major town in the division (as reflected in the division's name).

The Cardwell post and telegraph office was made an official post office in 1893, as part of a statewide move to make official all post offices at telegraph offices.

Despite all expectations, the port of Cardwell never developed into an important port for North Queensland, as access between the harbour and the hinterland was obstructed by the mountain range to the west of the town. Townsville became the principal access point for inland travel, and rapidly bypassed Cardwell in growth and development.

The design of the building required adaptation to suit the tropical climatic conditions. The timber shingles on the roof rotted, and by 1890 had been covered with iron. In 1904 the shingles were removed and iron roof replaced. The building had been constructed on low stumps without ant caps, and had been infested with termites by the 1890s. Renovation of the building in 1897 included the replacement of some floorboards and restumping the building on higher stumps with ant caps. A chimney and fireplace erected as part of the original building were removed.

The verandahs were progressively enclosed to include a bedroom, bathroom, and extension of the office. The original detached kitchen appears to have been demolished and replaced by a larger kitchen by 1896. The kitchen was linked via a covered walkway to the main building by 1904.

Following the Federation of Australia in 1901, the post and telegraph services of the Australian states were merged into a single national service called the Postmaster-General's Department (now Australia Post).

The building was a residence as well as a service outlet. The Postmaster was also Linesman-in-Charge, responsible for maintenance of the telegraph line in his sector. Often it was his wife as Postmistress and telegraph operator, who ran the office while her husband was away checking the line.

The post office was made an unofficial post office in 1966, and sold by the Australian Government in 1967. It was acquired by Mr Bill Wilson, a former Cardwell Post Master, and it continued to serve as an unofficial post office until c. 1983 when a new post office was opened in Cardwell. The building was then used as residence. before being converted to a heritage centre in 2003.

In 2001, the Cardwell Shire Council received funding through Queensland Heritage Trails Network for conservation and refurbishment of the former telegraph office, the former court house and lock-up to create a heritage centre. As well as being significant in the history of the port of Cardwell, the Cardwell-Normanton telegraph line was a lifeline for the isolated people of this region. It provided contact with the rest of the world and encouraged development of the area.

== Heritage centre ==
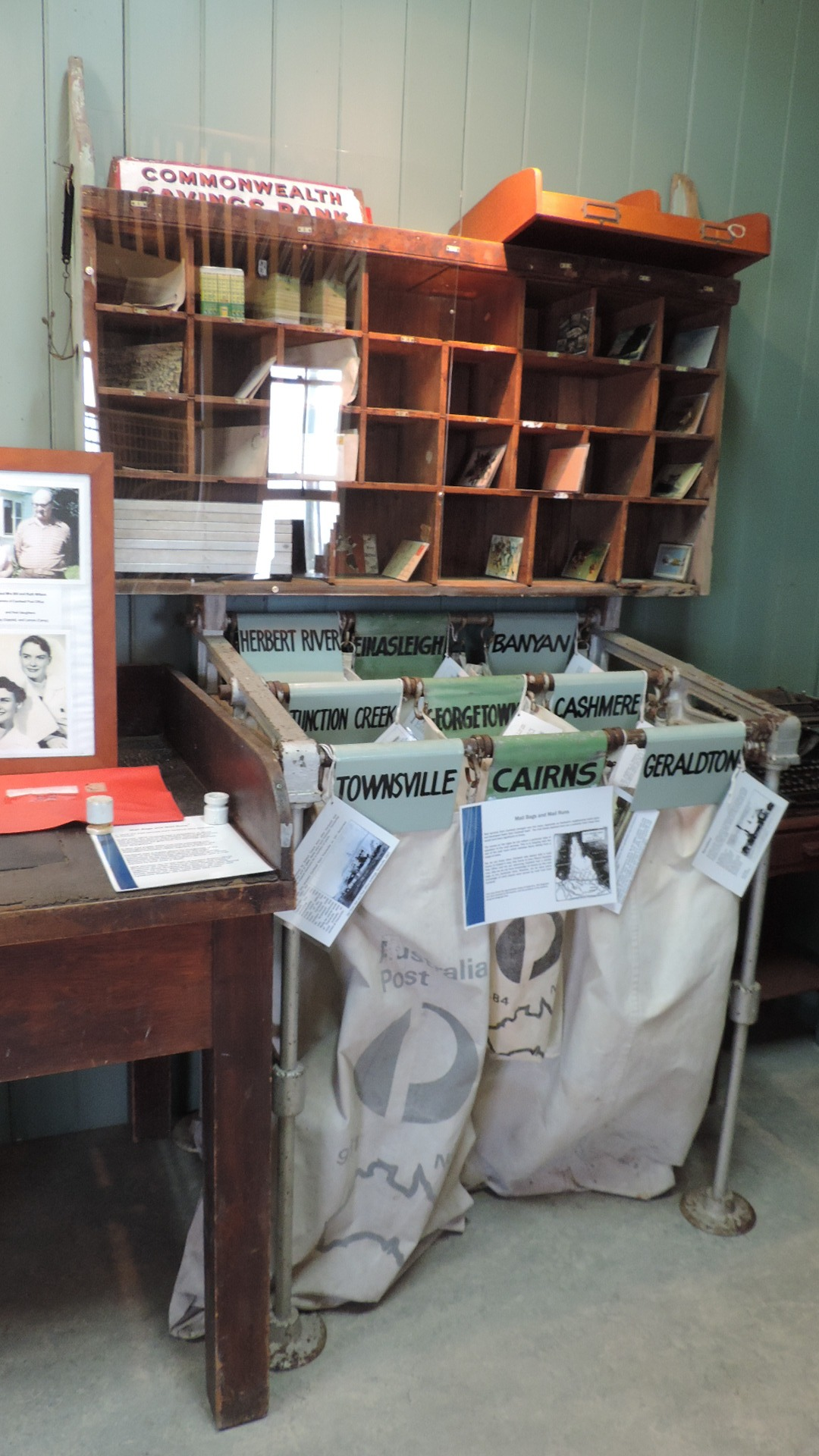
Mail sorting display, Heritage Centre, 2016

Of the precinct of buildings established in Cardwell's government reserve, as at 2016, only the Telegraph Office remains intact. The original courthouse was demolished following a cyclone, but its 1890s replacement, constructed on a much smaller scale and a more recent lock-up (jail) dating from 1907 have been re-located to the rear of the Cardwell Divisional Board Hall, later the Shire Hall. Sadly, this hall was severely damaged in 2011 by Tropical Cyclone Yasi. It housed council's museum at the time, which also suffered lost displays. However, the building was reconstructed closely to match its original timber appearance, with the stage area fortunately being retained within the rebuilt hall.

The resulting historic precinct presents a fine example of the workings and economics of colonial administration over a large thinly populated area, and the nineteenth century technology that coped with it.

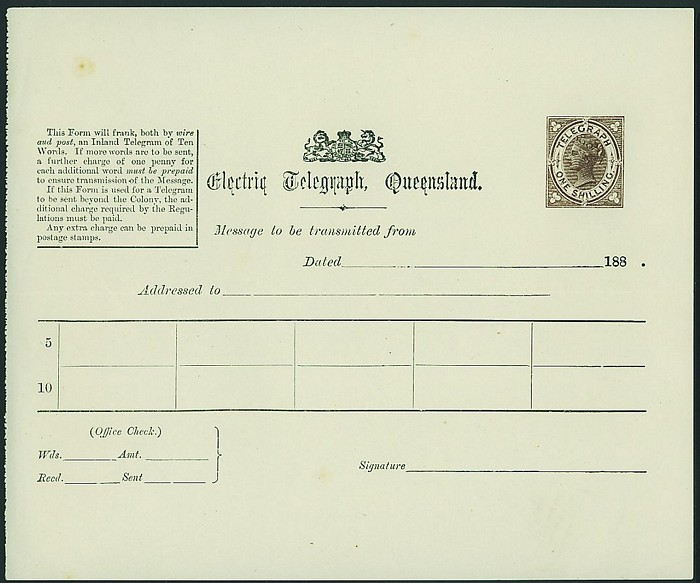
An unused Queensland telegraph form from the 1880s

The Telegraph Office building itself is also fascinating because of the depth of information preserved. Queensland State Archives and the National Archives of Australia yielded original specifications, plans, documents describing repairs and requirements and requests from staff for new chairs and a new clock, for example, allowing a good picture to be developed of the original construction of the building as well as changes it underwent through time. For example, originally it had a shingled roof and was set on low stumps with no ant caps but in response to the tropical climate, including cyclones and seasonal heavy rain, and white ants, the roof was replaced with iron and the building was lifted onto higher stumps with ant caps fitted.

Visitors to this heritage centre can view the original postal room with its old telephone exchange and 1870s counter and check out the old weather station instruments. A message can be sent by Morse code and an interactive display demonstrates Cardwell's role in the telegraph line race between Queensland and South Australia. In the courthouse, the workings of local justice are displayed while the lock-up next door provides a firm reminder of the pioneering days of the north.

Across Balliol Street the new Cardwell Library, built in 2007–2008, can be visited for more information on the local history. Next to the library, which is also a Cassowary Coast Customer Service Centre, a large outdoor display facility houses local artefacts including an old tip dray and a spring cart which was used in the area for many years. Cross-cut saws, a hand plough, a banana-case making machine, railway construction implements and other items are exhibited. Also near the library the old Cardwell School of Arts, which was the original town library, dating from the first decade of the nineteenth century, has also been refurbished. It now provides a home for local artists to display and sell their interesting art works.

== Description ==
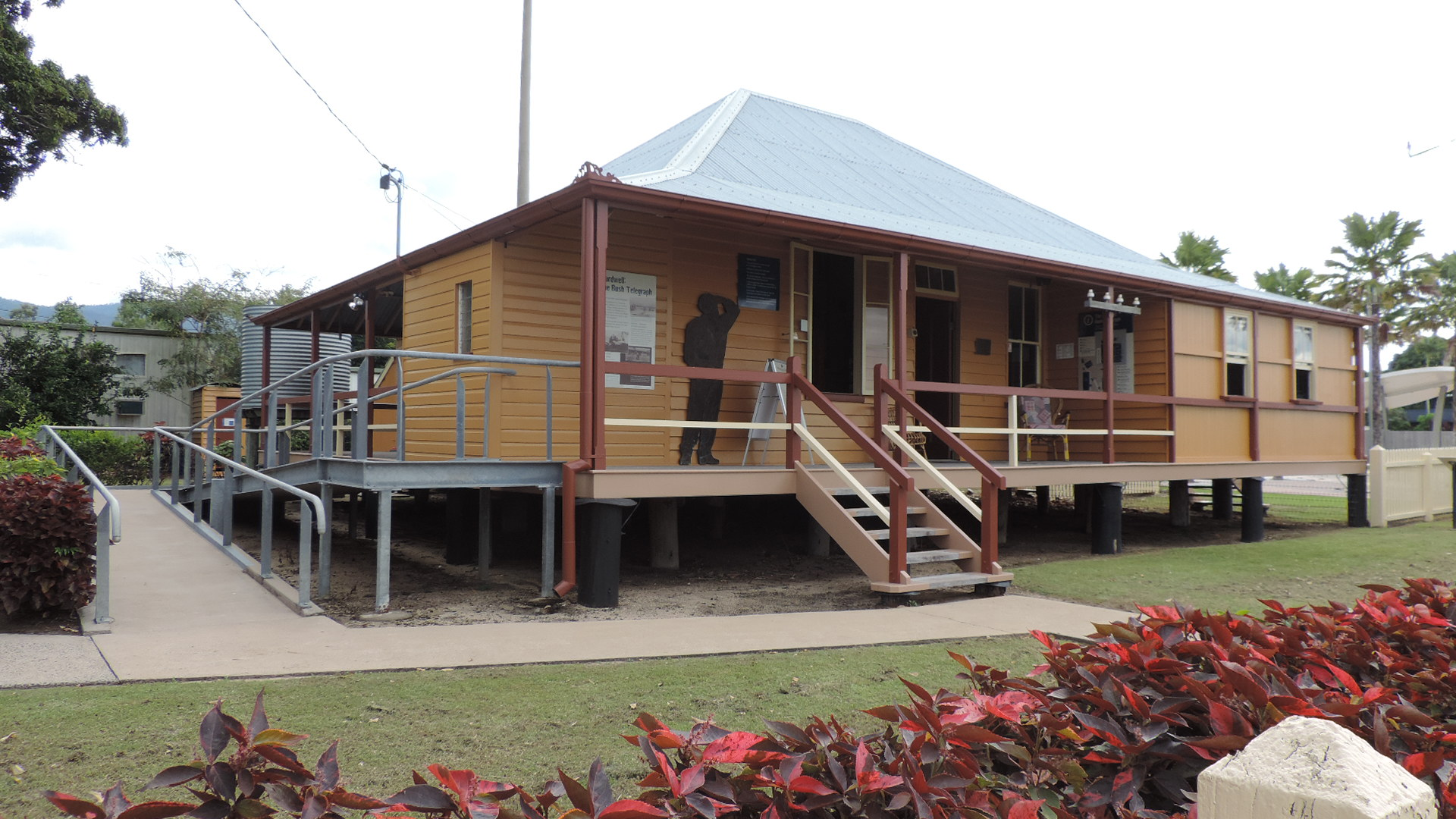
Cardwell Bush Telegraph, 2016

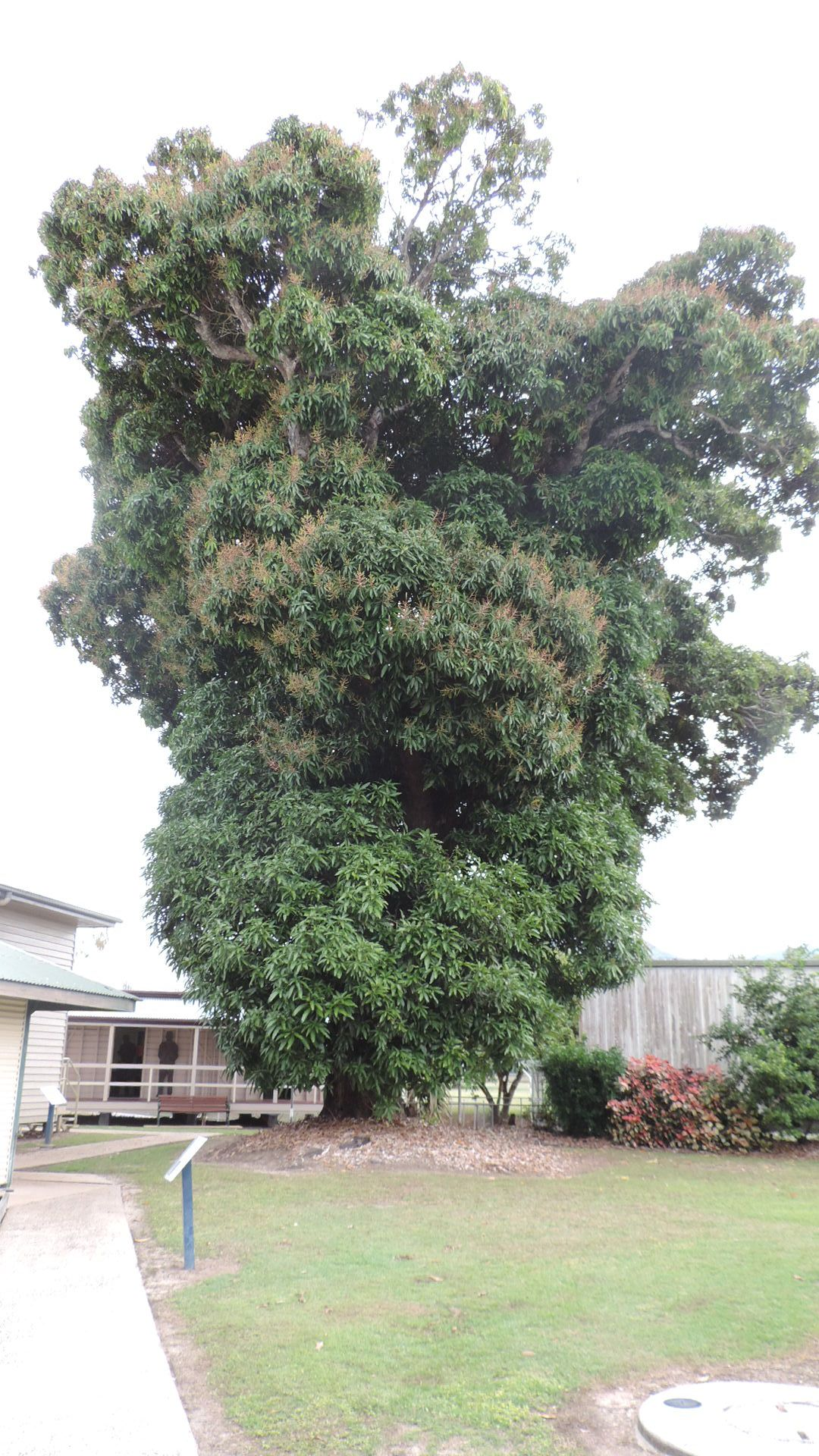
Mango tree at rear of Cardwell Bush Telegraph, 2016

The former Cardwell Post Office is located on the southern corner of Victoria Street, the main street of Cardwell, and Balliol Street opposite the foreshore fronting the entrance to Hinchinbrook Channel. It is part of a precinct of government buildings, including the former Shire Hall, Police Station and residence, former Court House, CWA building and Cardwell State School.

The building is a single-storeyed timber structure, consisting of four rooms with a central corridor, surrounded by verandahs to all four sides with a kitchen house at the rear connected by an enclosed walkway. The building has a hipped corrugated iron roof, with a break in pitch to the verandahs. There are some concrete stumps, but most are of timber.

The northeast verandah, and much of the northwest, has been enclosed with corrugated fibrous cement sheeting and has both timber sash and aluminium sliding windows. The western verandah corner is enclosed with chamferboard, part of the southeast has also been enclosed with chamferboard to form a bathroom, and the other verandahs have been enclosed with glass louvres and fibrous cement sheeting. The kitchen house is of single-skin chamferboard with sash windows and a hipped corrugated iron roof.

The single-skin building has weatherboard to the verandah walls with beaded horizontal boarding to the inside face of the two northeast rooms. Internal walls have vertical boarding and tie rods have been inserted connecting the top plates of opposite walls. Ceilings are boarded, with the outer edge being raked to the walls. Doors are timber panelled, with the front and back doors having glass fanlights.

The northern room was used as the post office and retains some early timber fixtures including shelving and drawers. This room has a counter, with a timber battened panel above, opening to the enclosed northern corner verandah. The eastern room has a large louvred window in the northeast wall, and a timber fireplace surround attached to the southeast wall over an enclosed doorway. Both rear rooms have tall casement windows, and verandahs have unlined ceilings.

A coconut palm is located at the northern corner of the site, another palm is to the west of the building, and a mango tree is at the south of the site. The property has a timber post and rail fence with wire infill to both street frontages. A weatherboard toilet is located to the south, and a timber tankstand with concrete stumps is located to the northwest, of the kitchen house. A Telstra Substation adjoins the southwest boundary.

== Heritage listing ==
The former Cardwell Post Office (now the Cardwell Bush Telegraph heritage centre) was listed on the Queensland Heritage Register on 21 October 1992 having satisfied the following criteria.

The place is important in demonstrating the evolution or pattern of Queensland's history.

It is important in demonstrating the evolution and pattern of Queensland's history in particular the establishment of Cardwell, initially as the port for North Queensland, and the expansion of telegraphic communication in Queensland.

The place demonstrates rare, uncommon or endangered aspects of Queensland's cultural heritage.

It demonstrates rare aspects of Queensland's cultural heritage, in particular, it is one of the oldest and one of the few extant telegraph/post office buildings erected c. 1869–c. 1885 The former post office is one of few remaining prefabricated telegraph/post office buildings, and is one of the oldest timber buildings, in North Queensland

The place is important in demonstrating the principal characteristics of a particular class of cultural places.

The configuration of the building with its four-room core and detached kitchen block and roof form demonstrates the principal characteristics of a common telegraph/post office building design type, used from c. 1869 – c. 1885 and of an 1860s-1870s government building.

The place is important because of its aesthetic significance.

The place is important in exhibiting a range of aesthetic characteristics valued by the community, in particular the contribution of the buildings and grounds, through siting, scale, form and planting, to the Victoria Street streetscape and Cardwell townscape and the intactness, in particular the plan, form and interiors of this timber and iron building.

The place has a strong or special association with a particular community or cultural group for social, cultural or spiritual reasons.

As a premises which operated as a Post Office from 1870 until 1983, it has a strong association with the Cardwell community.

== See also ==
- History of Queensland
