= Peter Graham (Conservative MPP) =

Canadian politician

Ontario MPP
- In office 1875–1877
- Preceded by: Delino Dexter Calvin
- Succeeded by: Delino Dexter Calvin
- Constituency: Frontenac

Personal details
- Born: September 15, 1827 Argyllshire, Scotland
- Died: January 18, 1877 (aged 49) Toronto, Ontario
- Party: Conservative
- Spouse: Mary Talbot
- Children: 8
- Occupation: Farmer

Peter J. P. Graham (September 15, 1827 – January 18, 1877) was an Ontario farmer and political figure. He represented Frontenac in the Legislative Assembly of Ontario as a Conservative member from 1875 to 1877.

He was born in Argyllshire, Scotland in 1827. He served as reeve for Pittsburgh and Howe Islands in 1871 and warden for Frontenac. He was a captain for the field battery at Kingston.

== Electoral history ==
1875 Ontario general election: Frontenac
Party	Candidate	Votes	%
Conservative	Peter Graham	884	59.61
Liberal	T. Dawson	599	40.39
Turnout		1,483	55.92
Eligible voters		2,652	
Conservative hold			
Source: Elections Ontario
