= Heyco =

German tool manufacturing company

Heyco GmbH & Co.
- Company type: Private
- Industry: Manufacturing
- Founded: 1937; 89 years ago in Remscheid, Germany
- Founders: Max and Ernst Heynen
- Headquarters: Remscheid, Germany
- Products: Automotive Hand Tools, Manufacturing Tools, Assembly Line Tooling.
- Website: heyco.de

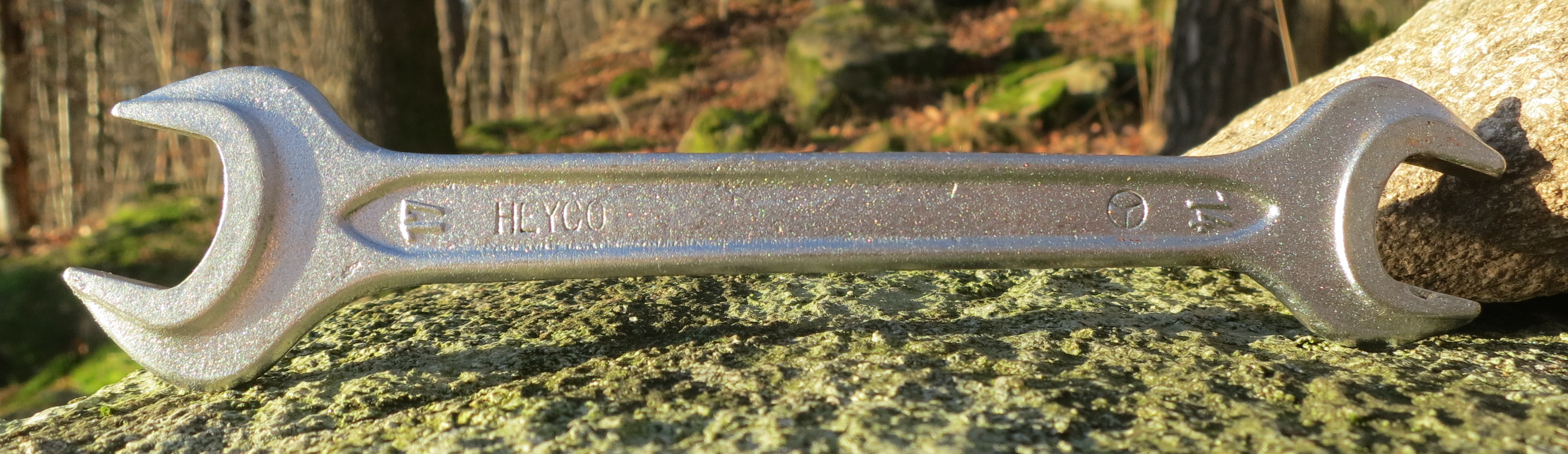
1980s open-ended wrench by Heyco

Heyco GmbH & Co. is a German tool manufacturing company which manufactures tools for the automotive industry. The company was founded in 1937 and is based in Remscheid, Germany. Heyco manufactures custom tooling for many German automotive production companies such as BMW, Audi, VW, and Mercedes-Benz. Heyco also provides industrial automotive production support in the manufacturing of polymer parts, plastic foils, aluminum laminated fiberglass textures, long glass composites, synthetic leather and polyurethane foam parts.

Heyco also manufactures electrical connector and wire protection systems for use in industrial and automotive applications.

== History ==
Heyco was founded in 1937 by Max and Ernst Heynen and started off manufacturing hand tools for the early automotive industry in Remscheid, Germany. From 1945, after World War II, Heyco began production of tools for assembly line automobile production.

Heyco expanded to Tittling/Bavaria, Germany in 1961, as its first site outside of Remscheid. A second site was opened in Derschen/Rheinland-Pfalz, Germany in 1981. In 1973, the first foreign subsidiary was founded in the Republic of Ireland, named Shamrock Forge & Tools. Heyco Production facilities also operate in the Czech Republic, and Ireland.

Heyco entered the plastics processing sector in 1980 with the takeover of Carl Steinmann Kunststoffverarbeitung GmbH, which was also based in Remscheid.

== OEM Tool Kits ==
Heyco manufactures tools used in many TÜV European automobile tool kits, such as those found in Volkswagens, Opels, Fords, Volvos, BMWs, Mercedes-Benzs, Rovers, Land Rovers and Rolls-Royces.
