= Joseph Longford Haycock =

Canadian politician (1850–1937)

Joseph Haycock

Ontario MPP
- In office 1894–1898
- Preceded by: Hugh Smith
- Succeeded by: John S. Gallagher
- Constituency: Frontenac

Personal details
- Born: April 1, 1850 Lennox County, Canada West
- Died: November 22, 1937 (aged 87)
- Party: Patrons of Industry
- Spouse: Martha Grange (m. 1877)
- Relations: John Thomas Grange (brother in law), Alexander Haycock (son)
- Occupation: Farmer

Joseph Langford Haycock (April 1, 1850 – November 22, 1937) was an Ontario farmer and political figure. He represented Frontenac in the Legislative Assembly of Ontario as a Liberal-Patrons of Industry member from 1894 to 1898.

He was born in Lennox County, Canada West, the son of Frederick Haycock, who came from England in 1837. He was also an auctioneer. Haycock was reeve of Kingston Township for seven years. He was leader of the Patrons of Industry in the provincial legislature. He served as president of the Frontenac Agricultural Association. One of Joseph's sons, Alexander Wilkinson Haycock, became a member of the British parliament. His wife, Martha Grange, was the sister of Ontario MPP John Thomas Grange.
