= Henry Wilmot (politician) =

Canadian politician

Ontario MPP
- In office 1883–1888
- Preceded by: Delino Dexter Calvin
- Succeeded by: Hugh Smith
- Constituency: Frontenac

Personal details
- Born: September 22, 1826 Portland Township, Frontenac County, Upper Canada
- Died: July 1, 1888 (aged 61) Toronto, Ontario
- Party: Conservative
- Occupation: Farmer

Henry Wilmot (September 22, 1826 – July 1, 1888) was an Ontario farmer and political figure. He represented Frontenac in the Legislative Assembly of Ontario from 1883 to 1888 as a Conservative member.

He was born in Pittsburg Township, Frontenac County, Upper Canada in 1826, the son of John Wilmot. He married Anne Graham in 1850. He worked in the timber trade before becoming a farmer. Wilmot served as reeve for Pittsburg and warden for Frontenac County. He also commanded the Kingston Field Battery. He was involved in the construction of the Kingston and Gananoque road. He died in office in 1888.
