= Haycock Island =

Island in Queensland

- Interactive map of Haycock Island

Geography
- Location: Coral Sea
- Coordinates: 16.731°S 145.694°E

Administration
- Australia
- State: Queensland

Haycock Island is an island in Far North Queensland northeast of Palm Cove and about 20 kilometres (12 mi) north of Cairns, Queensland in Trinity Bay.

Haycock Island is a few hundred metres southeast of Double Island.

The island was formed by a huge earthquake that caused a massive upheaval of the earth's tectonic plates. This can be observed by the steep angles of the rocks protruding upward from the ocean.

It is uninhabited by human beings. There is no fresh water source on Haycock Island.

It is sometimes nicknamed as the Scout's Hat because it looks like an oversized scout hat.

Haycock Island is a nesting haven for Bridled Terns.
