= Haycock, Alaska =

Unincorporated community in the state of Alaska, United States

- Unincorporated community
- Location within Alaska
- Coordinates: 65°12′35″N 161°09′56″W
- Country: United States
- State: Alaska
- Census area: Nome
- Elevation: 184 ft (56 m)
- Time zone: UTC-9 (Alaska (AKST))
  - Summer (DST): UTC-8 (AKDT)
- Area code: 907
- GNIS feature ID: 1403253

Haycock is an unincorporated community and mining camp in the Nome Census Area, Alaska, United States.

== History ==
The community was founded in 1914 as a mining camp; it had a post office from 1916 until 1957.

== Demographics ==
Historical population
| Census | Pop. | Note | %± |
|---|---|---|---|
| 1920 | 114 | | — |
| 1930 | 71 | | −37.7% |
| 1940 | 81 | | 14.1% |
U.S. Decennial Census

Haycock first appeared on the 1920 U.S. Census as an unincorporated village. It appeared again in 1930 and 1940. It has not returned since.

== Notable person ==
- William E. Beltz, carpenter and politician, was born in Haycock.
