= Haycock (surname) =

Haycock is a surname. Notable people with the surname include:

- Alexander Haycock (1882–1970), British politician
- D. Arthur Haycock (1916–1994), American secretary with the LDS Church
- David Boyd Haycock (born 1968), British writer
- Fred Haycock (1886–1955), English footballer
- Joseph Longford Haycock (1850–1937), Canadian farmer and politician
- Myfanwy Haycock (1913–1963), Welsh poet
- Obed Crosby Haycock (1901–1983), American scientist
- Pete Haycock (1951-2013), English musician
